= List of unincorporated communities in Wisconsin =

Wisconsin in United States

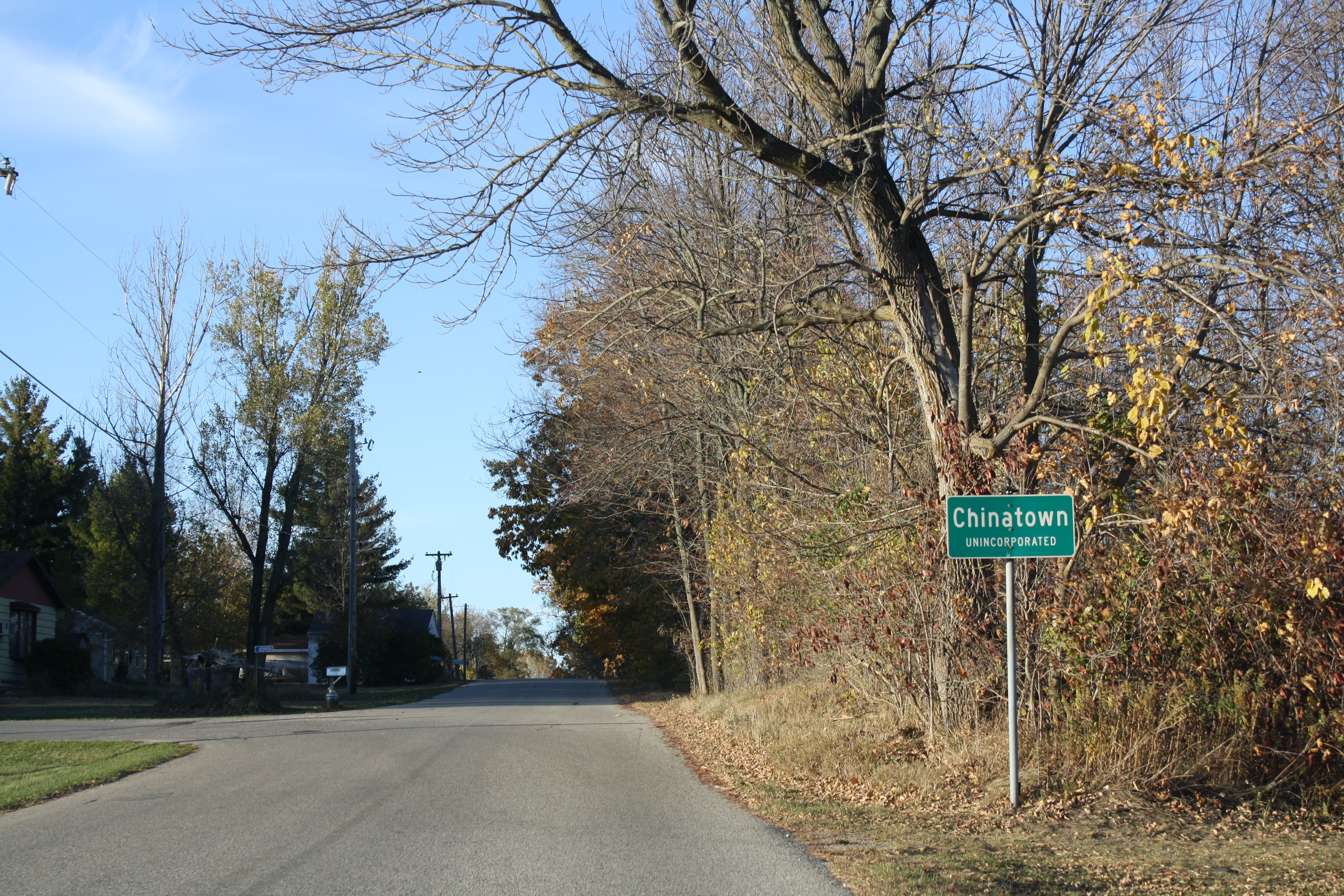
A road sign marking unincorporated Chinatown, Wisconsin

This is a list of unincorporated communities, also called unincorporated places, in the U.S. state of Wisconsin. These communities often do not appear on maps, but are real named places that have not officially incorporated.

Unlike incorporated communities (cities, villages, and towns), unincorporated communities are not automatically added to the official State Highway Map of Wisconsin. However, many unincorporated communities are listed in the map's index. The public can ask for a community to be added if it meets certain criteria such as if there is room for a label on the map and the location has sufficient population.

Unincorporated communities may share some similarities with ghost towns, but those are typically depopulated. Census-designated places can also overlap with these locations, but not all unincorporated places are CDPs.

Unincorporated communities in Wisconsin are legally closer to cities and villages than to towns, at least as far as electric utility billing and payment procedures. Residents can be billed at urban rates, unlike residents of towns only.

The Wisconsin State Cartographer's Office has been inventorying "hidden communities" in the state. In addition to unincorporated communities, these include three other types of locations. One type includes "cartographic phantoms", which appear on maps and do not exist on the ground. These could be phantom settlements, but typically are more like ghost towns that used to exist as settlements. The third type of location mentioned involves "unverified locales", which require more research before placing them in one of the other designations. In November 2025, a fourth type called "other places" was added to cover places that have been investigated, but are not unincorporated communities nor phantoms. This designation includes places like resorts, mobile home parks, industrial sites, and neighborhoods.

== Wisconsin unincorporated communities list ==
| Unincorporated Place Name | County | Town or Village |
|---|---|---|
| Abells Corners | Walworth | LaFayette/Sugar Creek |
| Abrams | Oconto | Abrams |
| Ackerville | Washington | Polk |
| Ada | Sheboygan | Herman |
| Adams Beach | Shawano | Belle Plaine |
| Addison | Washington | Addison |
| Advance | Shawano | Green Valley |
| Afton | Rock | Rock |
| Alaska | Kewaunee | Pierce |
| Albion | Dane | Albion |
| Alderley | Dodge | Ashippun |
| Allen's Grove | Walworth | Darien |
| Allen | Eau Claire | Clear Creek |
| Allenton | Washington | Addison |
| Allenville | Winnebago | Vinland |
| Alpha | Burnett | Wood River |
| Alto | Fond du Lac | Alto |
| Alvin | Forest | Alvin |
| Amberg | Marinette | Amberg |
| Angelica | Shawano | Angelica/Maple Grove |
| Angelo | Monroe | Angelo |
| Angus | Barron | Cedar Lake |
| Anston | Brown | Pittsfield |
| Arbor Vitae | Vilas | Arbor Vitae |
| Argonne | Forest | Argonne |
| Arkansaw | Pepin | Waterville |
| Arkdale | Adams | Strongs Prairie |
| Armstrong Creek | Forest | Armstrong Creek |
| Armstrong | Fond Du Lac | Osceola |
| Arnott | Portage | Stockton |
| Arthur | Grant | Lima |
| Ash Ridge | Richland | Bloom/Forest |
| Ashford | Fond Du Lac | Ashford |
| Ashippun | Dodge | Ashippun |
| Ashton | Dane | Springfield |
| Askeaton | Brown | Holland |
| Astico | Dodge | Elba |
| Athelstane | Marinette | Athelstane |
| Atlas | Polk | Laketown |
| Attica | Green | Brooklyn |
| Atwater | Dodge | Chester |
| Atwood | Clark | Green Grove |
| Aurora | Florence | Aurora |
| Auroraville | Waushara | Aurora |
| Avalanche | Vernon | Webster |
| Avalon | Rock | Bradford |
| Avon | Lafayette | Darlington |
| Babcock | Wood | Remington |
| Baileys Harbor | Door | Baileys Harbor |
| Bakerville | Wood | Lincoln |
| Bancroft | Portage | Pine Grove |
| Barnum | Crawford | Haney |
| Barre Mills | La Crosse | Barre |
| Barronett | Barron | Lakeland |
| Basco | Dane | Montrose |
| Bashaw | Burnett | Dewey |
| Bassett | Kenosha | Randall |
| Basswood | Richland | Eagle |
| Batavia | Sheboygan | Scott |
| Beach Corners | Trempealeau | Ettrick |
| Bear Valley | Richland | Ithaca |
| Beaver Edge | Dodge | Beaver Dam |
| Beaver | Marinette | Beaver |
| Beecher | Marinette | Beecher |
| Beechwood | Sheboygan | Scott |
| Beetown | Grant | Beetown |
| Beldenville | Pierce | Trimbelle |
| Belle Plaine | Shawano | Belle Plaine |
| Bellinger | Taylor | Taft/Roosevelt |
| Benderville | Brown | Scott |
| Benet Lake | Kenosha | Salem Lakes |
| Bennett | Douglas | Bennett |
| Benoit | Bayfield | Mason |
| Bethel | Wood | Richfield |
| Bevent | Marathon | Bevent |
| Big Flats | Adams | Big Flats |
| Big Patch | Grant | Smelser |
| Big Spring | Adams | New Haven |
| Binghamton | Outagamie | Black Creek |
| Black Hawk | Sauk | Troy |
| Blackwell | Forest | Blackwell |
| Blaine | Portage | Belmont |
| Blenker | Wood | Milladore |
| Bloom City | Richland | Bloom |
| Bloomingdale | Vernon | Clinton |
| Bloomville | Lincoln | Russell |
| Bluff Siding | Buffalo | Buffalo |
| Bluffview | Sauk | Sumpter |
| Boardman | St. Croix | Richmond |
| Boltonville | Washington | Farmington |
| Borth | Waushara | Poy Sippi |
| Bosstown | Richland | Sylvan |
| Boulder Junction | Vilas | Boulder Junction |
| Bowers | Walworth | LaFayette |
| Brackett | Eau Claire | Washington |
| Bradley | Lincoln | Bradley |
| Branch | Manitowoc | Cato |
| Branstad | Burnett | Grantsburg |
| Brant | Calumet | Chilton |
| Brantwood | Price | Knox |
| Breed | Oconto | Breed |
| Briarton | Shawano | Lessor |
| Brice Prairie | Lacrosse | Onalaska |
| Bridgeport | Crawford | Bridgeport |
| Briggsville | Marquette | Douglas |
| Brill | Barron | Oak Grove |
| Brooks | Adams | New Chester |
| Brookside | Oconto | Pensaukee |
| Brothertown | Calumet | Brothertown |
| Brule | Douglas | Brule |
| Brussels | Door | Brussels |
| Bryant | Langlade | Price |
| Buck Creek | Richland | Rockbridge |
| Bud | Vernon | Jefferson |
| Budsin | Marquette | Crystal Lake |
| Buena Vista | Waukesha | Delafield |
| Bunker Hill | Richland | Westford |
| Burkhardt | St. Croix | St. Joseph |
| Burnett | Dodge | Burnett |
| Burr Oak | La Crosse | Farmington |
| Burton | Grant | Waterloo |
| Busseyville | Jefferson | Sumner |
| Butte des Morts | Winnebago | Winneconne |
| Byron | Fond du Lac | Byron |
| Cable | Bayfield | Cable |
| Calamine | Lafayette | Willow Springs |
| Caldwell | Racine | Waterford |
| Callon | Marathon | Weston |
| Calumetville | Fond du Lac | Calumet |
| Calvary | Fond du Lac | Marshfield |
| Camp Lake | Kenosha | Salem Lakes |
| Campia | Barron | Rice Lake |
| Cana Island | Door | Baileys Harbor |
| Canton | Barron | Sumner |
| Carlsville | Door | Egg Harbor |
| Carnot | Door | Forestville |
| Caroline | Shawano | Grant |
| Carter | Forest | Wabeno |
| Caryville | Dunn | Rock Creek |
| Cataract | Monroe | Little Falls |
| Cato | Manitowoc | Cato |
| Cavour | Forest | Caswell |
| Cayuga | Ashland | Morse |
| Cedar Creek | Washington | Polk |
| Cedar Falls | Dunn | Red Cedar |
| Cedar Lake | Washington | Polk |
| Center House | Green Lake | Green Lake |
| Center Valley | Outagamie | Center |
| Centerville | Trempealeau | Trempealeau |
| Champion | Brown | Green Bay |
| Charlesburg | Calumet | Brothertown |
| Chelsea | Taylor | Chelsea |
| Cherokee | Marathon | Hull |
| Chili | Clark | Fremont |
| Chittamo | Washburn | Frog Creek |
| Christie | Clark | Weston |
| City Point | Jackson | City Point |
| Clam Falls | Polk | Clam Falls |
| Clam Lake | Ashland | Gordon |
| Clarks Mills | Manitowoc | Cato |
| Clarno | Green | Clarno |
| Clay | Jackson | Komensky |
| Clearwater Lake | Oneida | Three Lakes |
| Cleghorn | Eau Claire | Pleasant Valley |
| Clifford | Lincoln/Oneida/Price | Somo/Lynne/Knox |
| Clifton | Monroe | Clifton |
| Clyde | Iowa | Clyde |
| Clyman Junction | Dodge | Clyman |
| Colgate | Washington/Waukesha | Richfield/Lisbon |
| Collins | Manitowoc | Rockland |
| Commonwealth | Florence | Commonwealth |
| Como | Walworth | Geneva |
| Comstock | Barron | Crystal Lake |
| Concord | Jefferson | Concord |
| Connorsville | Dunn | New Haven |
| Conover | Vilas | Conover |
| Cooksville | Rock | Porter |
| Coolidge | Price | Fifield/Worcester |
| Cooperstown | Manitowoc | Cooperstown |
| Coral City | Trempealeau | Pigeon |
| Cornelia | Grant | Harrison |
| Cornucopia | Bayfield | Bell |
| Cottonville | Adams | Preston |
| County Line | Marinette/Oconto | Grover/Little River |
| Cozy Corner | Douglas | Dairyland |
| Cream | Buffalo | Lincoln |
| Curran | Kewaunee | Franklin |
| Cushing | Polk | Laketown/Sterling |
| Custer | Portage | Stockton |
| Cylon | St. Croix | Cylon/Emerald |
| Czechville | Buffalo | Milton |
| Dacada | Ozaukee/Sheboygan | Belgium/Holland |
| Dairyland | Douglas | Dairyland |
| Dale | Outagamie | Dale |
| Daleyville | Dane | Perry |
| Dalton | Green Lake | Kingston |
| Danbury | Burnett | Swiss |
| Dancy | Marathon | Knowlton |
| Danville | Dodge | Elva |
| Dayton | Green | Exeter |
| Deansville | Dane | Medina |
| Deerbrook | Langlade | Neva |
| Dellwood | Adams | Strongs Prairie |
| Dellwood | Sauk | Dellona |
| Deronda | Polk | Lincoln |
| Dexterville | Wood | Dexter |
| Diamond Bluff | Pierce | Diamond Bluff |
| Dodge | Trempealeau | Dodge |
| Doering | Lincoln | Schley |
| Donald | Taylor | Pershing |
| Downsville | Dunn | Dunn |
| Draper | Sawyer | Draper |
| Drummond | Bayfield | Drummond |
| Dunbar | Marinette | Dunbar |
| Dundas | Calumet | Woodville |
| Dundee | Fond du Lac | Osceola |
| Dyckesville | Brown/Kewaunee | Green Bay/Red River |
| Eagleton | Chippewa | Eagle Point |
| Earl | Washburn | Springbrook |
| East Bristol | Dane | Bristol |
| East Farmington | Polk | Farmington |
| Easton | Adams | Easton |
| Eau Galle | Dunn | Eau Galle |
| Edgewater | Sawyer | Edgewater |
| Edmund | Iowa | Lynden |
| Edwards | Sheboygan | Herman |
| Eidsvold | Clark | Thorp |
| El Paso | Pierce | El Paso |
| Elcho | Langlade | Elcho |
| Eldorado | Fond du Lac | Eldorado |
| Elk Creek | Trempealeau | Hale |
| Ella | Pepin | Frankfort |
| Ellenboro | Grant | Ellenboro |
| Ellis | Portage | Sharon |
| Ellison Bay | Door | Liberty Grove |
| Ellisville | Kewaunee | Montpelier |
| Elmhurst | Langlade | Rolling |
| Elmore | Fond Du Lac | Ashford |
| Elton | Langlade | Evergreen |
| Emerald Grove | Rock | Bradford |
| Emerald | St. Croix | Emerald/Glenwood |
| Enterprise | Oneida | Enterprise |
| Erdman | Sheboygan | Sheboygan |
| Erin Corner | St. Croix | Erin Prairie |
| Esdaile | Pierce | Hartland |
| Esofea | Vernon | Jefferson |
| Eureka Center | Polk | Eureka |
| Eureka | Winnebago | Rushford |
| Euren | Kewaunee | Lincoln |
| Excelsior | Richland | Richwood |
| Fair Play | Grant | Jamestown |
| Fairview | Crawford | Utica |
| Falun | Burnett | Daniels/Wood River |
| Fargo | Vernon | Franklin |
| Farmersville | Dodge | LeRoy |
| Fence | Florence | Fence |
| Fifield | Price | Fifield |
| Fillmore | Washington | Farmington |
| Finley | Juneau | Finley |
| Fish Creek | Door | Gibraltar |
| Fisk | Winnebago | Utica |
| Five Corners | Outagamie | Center/Freedom/Osborn |
| Five Points | Richland | Akan |
| Flintville | Brown | Suamico |
| Florence | Florence | Florence |
| Folsom | Vernon | Franklin |
| Fontenoy | Brown | New Denmark |
| Forest Junction | Calumet | Brillion |
| Forest | St. Croix | Forest |
| Fort McCoy | Monroe | LaFayette |
| Forward | Dane | Perry |
| Foster | Eau Claire | Clear Creek |
| Four Corners | Monroe | Little Falls |
| Fox Creek | Polk | Georgetown |
| Foxboro | Douglas | Summit |
| Franklin | Jackson | Franklin |
| Franklin | Sheboygan | Herman |
| Franksville | Racine | Caledonia |
| Freedom | Outagamie | Freedom |
| Frenchville | Trempealeau | Gale |
| Frostville | Oconto | Maple Valley |
| Fulton | Rock | Fulton |
| Gad | Marathon/Taylor | Bern/Browning |
| Gagen | Oneida | Piehl |
| Galloway | Marathon | Franzen |
| Garfield | Portage | New Hope |
| Genesee Depot | Waukesha | Genesee |
| Genesee | Waukesha | Genesee |
| Georgetown | Grant | Smelser |
| Germania | Marquette | Shields |
| Gibbsville | Sheboygan | Lima |
| Gilbert | Lincoln | Bradley |
| Gile | Iron | Montreal |
| Gillingham | Richland | Marshall |
| Gills Rock | Door | Liberty Grove |
| Gilmanton | Buffalo | Gilmanton |
| Glandon | Marathon | Hewitt |
| Gleason | Lincoln | Russell |
| Glen Haven | Grant | Glen Haven |
| Glen Oak | Marquette | Montello |
| Glendale | Monroe | Glendale |
| Glidden | Ashland | Jacobs |
| Globe | Clark | Weston |
| Goodman | Marinette | Goodman |
| Goodnow | Oneida | Cassian |
| Goodrich | Taylor | Goodrich |
| Gordon | Douglas | Gordon |
| Gotham | Richland | Buena Vista |
| Grand Chute | Outagamie | Grand Chute |
| Grand Marsh | Adams | New Chester |
| Grand View | Bayfield | Grandview |
| Granite Heights | Marathon | Texas |
| Gravesville | Calumet | Chilton |
| Green Valley | Shawano | Green Valley |
| Greenbush | Sheboygan | Greenbush |
| Gregorville | Kewaunee | Lincoln |
| Grellton | Jefferson | Milford |
| Grimms | Manitowoc | Cato |
| Gurney | Iron | Gurney |
| Hager City | Pierce | Trenton |
| Halder | Marathon | Emmet |
| Hamburg | Marathon | Hamburg |
| Hannibal | Taylor | Cleveland |
| Hanover | Rock | Plymouth |
| Harmony Grove | Columbia | Lodi |
| Harmony | Marinette | Grover |
| Harrison | Lincoln | Harrison |
| Harrisville | Marquette | Harris |
| Harshaw | Oneida | Cassian |
| Hatfield | Jackson | Adams |
| Hauer | Sawyer | Sand Lake |
| Haven | Sheboygan | Mosel |
| Hawthorne | Douglas | Hawthorne |
| Hayes | Oconto | How |
| Hayton | Calumet | Charlestown |
| Hazelhurst | Oneida | Hazelhurst |
| Heafford Junction | Lincoln | Bradley |
| Hebron | Jefferson | Hebron |
| Heffron | Portage | Belmont |
| Hegg | Trempealeau | Ettrick |
| Helena | Iowa | Arena |
| Helenville | Jefferson | Jefferson |
| Henrysville | Brown | Eaton |
| Herbster | Bayfield | Clover |
| Herold | Buffalo | Belvidere |
| Hersey | St. Croix | Springfield |
| Hertel | Burnett | La Follette |
| Hickory Corners | Oconto | Maple Valley |
| Highbridge | Ashland | Ashland |
| Hiles | Forest | Hiles |
| Hill Point | Sauk | Washington |
| Hillsdale | Barron | Maple Grove |
| Hingham | Sheboygan | Lima |
| Hintz | Oconto | Underhill |
| Hofa Park | Shawano | Maple Grove |
| Hogarty | Marathon | Harrison/Plover |
| Holcombe | Chippewa | Lake Holcombe |
| Holland | Brown | Holland |
| Hollister | Langlade | Wolf River |
| Holy Cross | Ozaukee | Belgium |
| Honey Creek | Walworth | Spring Prairie |
| Hoopers Mill | Jefferson | Milford |
| Hope | Dane | Cottage Grove |
| Horse Creek | Polk | Alden |
| Houlton | St. Croix | St. Joseph |
| Hub City | Richland | Henrietta |
| Hubbleton | Jefferson | Milford |
| Hubertus | Washington | Richfield |
| Huilsburg | Dodge | Herman |
| Humbird | Clark | Mentor |
| Huntington | St. Croix | Star Prairie |
| Hurricane | Grant | South Lancaster |
| Husher | Racine | Caledonia |
| Hyde | Iowa | Ridgeway |
| Indian Creek | Polk | Lorain |
| Indianford | Rock | Fulton |
| Ino | Bayfield | Keystone |
| Institute | Door | Sevastopol |
| Irma | Lincoln | Birch |
| Iron Belt | Iron | Knight |
| Iron River | Bayfield | Iron River |
| Irvington | Dunn | Menomonie |
| Isaar | Outagamie | Seymour |
| Island Lake | Rusk | Big Bend, Rusk County, Wisconsin |
| Ithaca | Rishland | Ithaca |
| Ives Grove | Racine | Yorkville |
| Ixonia | Jefferson | Ixonia |
| Jacksonport | Door | Jacksonport |
| Jefferson Junction | Jefferson | Aztalan |
| Jenkynsville | Lafayette | Benton |
| Jennings | Oneida | Schoepke |
| Jericho | Calumet | Brothertown |
| Jericho | Waukesha | Eagle/Mukwonago |
| Jewett | St. Croix | Erin Prairie |
| Jim Falls | Chippewa | Anson |
| Joel | Polk | Clayton |
| Johannesburg | St. Croix | Star Prairie |
| Johnsburg | Fond Du Lac | Calumet/Taycheedah |
| Johnsonville | Sheboygan | Sheboygan Falls |
| Johnstown Center | Rock | Johnstown |
| Jonesdale | Iowa | Waldwick |
| Jordan Center | Green | Jordan |
| Juda | Green | Jefferson |
| Juddville | Door | Gibraltar |
| Jump River | Taylor | Jump River/McKinley |
| Kansasville | Racine | Dover |
| Keene | Portage | Buena Vista |
| Kegonsa | Dane | Pleasant Springs |
| Kellner | Portage | Grant |
| Kellners Corners | Manitowoc | Manitowoc Rapids |
| Kelly | Marathon | Weston |
| Kempster | Langlade | Neva |
| Keshena | Menominee | Menominee |
| Keyeser | Columbia | Leeds |
| Kickapoo Center | Vernon | Kickapoo |
| Kieler | Grant | Jamestown |
| King | Waupaca | Farmington |
| Kirby | Monroe | Lincoln |
| Kirchhayn | Washington | Jackson |
| Klevenville | Dane | Springdale |
| Klondike | Oconto | Brazeau |
| Kloten | Calumet | Stockbridge |
| Kneeland | Racine | Raymond |
| Knowles | Dodge | Lomira |
| Knowlton | Marathon | Knowlton |
| Kodan | Kewaunee | Ahnapee |
| Kohlsville | Washington | Wayne |
| Kolberg | Door | Brussels |
| Kolbs Corner | Brown | Ledgeview |
| Krakow | Shawano | Angelica |
| Krok | Kewaunee | West Kewaunee |
| Kunesh | Brown | Pittsfield |
| La Grange | Walworth | La Grange |
| La Pointe | Ashland | La Pointe |
| Lac du Flambeau | Vilas | Lac du Flambeau |
| Ladoga | Fond Du Lac | Springvale |
| Lake Beulah | Walworth | East Troy |
| Lake Church | Ozaukee | Belgium |
| Lake Tomahawk | Oneida | Lake Tomahawk |
| Lakewood | Oconto | Lakewood |
| Lamartine | Fond du Lac | Lamartine |
| Lamont | Lafayette | Lamont |
| Lampson | Washburn | Brooklyn |
| Land o' Lakes | Vilas | Land o' Lakes |
| Langes Corners | Brown | New Denmark |
| Langlade | Langlade | Wolf River |
| Laona | Forest | Laona |
| Lark | Brown | Morrison |
| Larrabee | Manitowoc | Gibson |
| Larsen | Winnebago | Clayton |
| Lawrence | Marquette | Westfield |
| LeRoy | Dodge | LeRoy |
| Lead Mine | Lafayette | New Diggings |
| Lebanon | Dodge | Lebanon |
| Leeds Center | Columbia | Leeds |
| Leeman | Outagamie | Maine |
| Leipsig | Dodge | Beaver Dam |
| Leland | Sauk | Honey Creek |
| Lemington | Sawyer | Couderay |
| Lennox | Oneida | Schoepke |
| Leon | Monroe | Leon |
| Leopolis | Shawano | Herman |
| Leslie | Lafayette | Belmont |
| Levis | Jackson | Garfield |
| Lewis | Polk | Clam Falls |
| Leyden | Rock | Janesville |
| Liberty Pole | Vernon | Franklin |
| Lily | Langlade | Langlade |
| Lima Center | Rock | Lima |
| Lind Center | Waupaca | Lind |
| Lindsey | Wood | Rock |
| Little Chicago | Marathon | Hamburg |
| Little Falls | Polk | Alden |
| Little Prairie | Walworth | Troy |
| Little Rapids | Brown | Lawrence |
| Little Rose | Marathon | Eau Pleine |
| Little Suamico | Oconto | Little Suamico |
| London | Jefferson | Lake Mills |
| Long Lake | Florence | Long Lake |
| Longwood | Clark | Longwood |
| Lookout | Buffalo | Dover |
| Loomis | Marinette | Lake |
| Loreto | Sauk | Bear Creek |
| Loretta | Sawyer | Draper |
| Louis Corners | Manitowoc | Schleswig |
| Louisburg | Grant | Jamestown |
| Loyd | Richland | Willow |
| Lugerville | Price | Flambeau |
| Lund | Pepin/Pierce | Pepin/Maiden Rock |
| Lunds | Shawano | Waukechon |
| Lyndhurst | Shawano | Herman |
| Lynn | Clark | Lynn |
| Lyons | Walworth | Lyons |
| Mackville | Outagamie | Center |
| Magnolia | Rock | Magnolia |
| Malone | Fond Du Lac | Taycheedah |
| Manchester | Green Lake | Manchester |
| Manitowish Waters | Vilas | Manitowish Waters |
| Manitowish | Iron | Mercer |
| Maple | Douglas | Maple |
| Mapleton | Waukesha | Lac La Belle |
| Maplewood | Door | Forestville |
| Marblehead | Fond Du Lac | Eden |
| March Rapids | Marathon | Eau Pleine |
| Marengo | Ashland | White River |
| Marshland | Buffalo | Buffalo |
| Martell | Pierce | Martell |
| Martinsville | Dane | Springfield |
| Martintown | Green | Cadiz |
| Marxville | Dane | Berry |
| Marytown | Fond Du Lac | Calumet |
| Mather | Juneau | Kingston |
| Maxville | Buffalo | Maxville |
| Mayfield | Washington | Polk |
| McAllister | Marinette | Wagner |
| McCord | Lincoln/Oneida | Wilson/Little Rice |
| McKinley | Polk | McKinley |
| McNaughton | Oneida | Newbold |
| Meadow Valley | Juneau | Kingston |
| Medina | Outagamie | Dale |
| Menchalville | Manitowoc | Franklin |
| Mercer | Iron | Mercer |
| Meridean | Dunn | Peru |
| Metz | Winnebago | Wolf River |
| Middle Inlet | Marinette | Middle Inlet |
| Middle Ridge | Lacrosse | Washington |
| Middle River | Douglas | Amnicon |
| Midway | Lacrosse | Onalaska |
| Mikana | Barron | Cedar Lake |
| Mikesville | Winnebago | Clayton |
| Milan | Marathon | Johnson |
| Milford | Jefferson | Milford |
| Millard | Walworth | Sugar Creek |
| Millston | Jackson | Millston |
| Mindoro | Lacrosse | Farmington |
| Minersville | Ashland | Ashland |
| Minnesota Junction | Dodge | Oak Grove |
| Minocqua | Oneida | Minocqua |
| Misha Mokwa | Buffalo | Nelson |
| Modena | Buffalo | Modena |
| Mole Lake | Forest | Nashville |
| Monches | Waukesha | Merton |
| Monico | Oneida | Monico |
| Monroe Center | Adams | Monroe |
| Monterey | Waukesha | Lac La Belle |
| Moon | Marathon | Mosinee |
| Moose Junction | Douglas | Dairyland |
| Moquah | Bayfield | Pilsen |
| Morgan | Shawano | Red Springs |
| Morrison | Brown | Morrison |
| Morrisonville | Dane | Windsor |
| Morse | Ashland | Gordon |
| Mosling | Oconto | Gillett/Underhill |
| Mount Ida | Grant | Mount Ida |
| Mount Morris | Waushara | Mount Morris |
| Mount Tabor | Vernon | Forest |
| Mount Vernon | Dane | Springdale |
| Mount Zion | Crawford | Scott |
| Mountain | Oconto | Mountain |
| Murat | Taylor | Hammel |
| Myra | Washington | Trenton |
| Nabob | Washington | West Bend |
| Namur | Door | Union |
| Nanaweyah Ominihekan | Menominee/Shawano | Menominee/Red Springs |
| Navarino | Shawano | Navarino |
| Neda | Dodge | Hubbard |
| Nelma | Forest | Alvin |
| Nenno | Washington | Addison |
| Neopit | Menominee | Menominee |
| Neptune | Richland | Ithaca |
| Neuern | Kewaunee | Luxemburg/Montpelier |
| Neva Corners | Langlade | Neva |
| Neva | Langlade | Neva |
| New Amsterdam | Lacrosse | Holland |
| New Diggings | Lafayette | New Diggings |
| New Fane | Fond Du Lac | Auburn |
| New Franken | Brown | Humboldt/Green Bay/Scott |
| New Miner | Juneau | Armenia |
| New Munster | Kenosha | Wheatland |
| New Post | Sawyer | Hunter |
| New Prospect | Fond Du Lac | Auburn |
| Newald | Forest | Ross |
| Newark | Rock | Newark |
| Newburg Corners | La Crosse | Washington |
| Newry | Vernon | Christiana |
| Newton | Manitowoc | Newton |
| Newton | Vernon | Harmony |
| Newville | Rock | Fulton |
| Norman | Kewaunee | Carlton |
| Norrie | Marathon | Norrie |
| North Andover | Grant | Glen Haven |
| North Bend | Jackson | North Bend |
| North Bristol | Dane | Bristol |
| North Cape | Racine | Norway/Raymond |
| North Clayton | Crawford | Clayton |
| North Lake | Waukesha | Merton |
| North Leeds | Columbia | Leeds |
| North Readfield | Waupaca | Caledonia |
| Northfield | Jackson | Northfield |
| Northland | Waupaca | Harrison |
| Northport | Waupaca | Mukwa |
| Northwoods Beach | Sawyer | Bass Lake |
| Norton | Dunn | Tainter |
| Norway Grove | Dane | Vienna |
| Norway Ridge | Monroe | Scott |
| Nutterville | Marathon | Wausau |
| Nye | Polk | Osceola |
| Oak Center | Fond Du Lac | Oakfield |
| Oak Hill | Jefferson | Sullivan |
| Oakley | Green | Spring Grove |
| Odanah | Ashland | Sanborn |
| Ogema | Price | Ogema |
| Ojibwa | Sawyer | Ojibwa |
| Okauchee | Waukesha | Lac La Belle |
| Okee | Columbia | West Point |
| Old Ashippun | Dodge | Ashippun |
| Old Lebanon | Dodge | Lebanon |
| Olivet | Pierce | Gilman/Spring Lake |
| Oneida | Outagamie | Oneida |
| Orihula | Winnebago | Wolf River |
| Osman | Manitowoc | Meeme |
| Otsego | Columbia | Otsego |
| Oxbo | Sawyer | Draper |
| Packwaukee | Marquette | Packwaukee |
| Padus | Forest | Wabeno |
| Paoli | Dane | Montrose |
| Parrish | Langlade | Parrish |
| Patzau | Douglas | Summit |
| Pearson | Langlade | Ainsworth |
| Peebles | Fond Du Lac | Taycheedah |
| Pelican Lake | Oneida | Schoepke |
| Pell Lake | Walworth | Bloomfield |
| Pella | Shawano | Pella |
| Pembine | Marinette | Pembine |
| Pence | Iron | Pence |
| Peninsula Center | Door | Baileys Harbor |
| Penokee Gap | Ashland | Morse |
| Pensaukee | Oconto | Pensaukee |
| Perkinstown | Taylor | Grover |
| Peru | Portage | New Hope |
| Petersburg | Crawford | Haney |
| Phelps | Vilas | Phelps |
| Phipps | Sawyer | Lenroot |
| Phlox | Langlade | Norwood |
| Pickerel | Langlade | Langlade |
| Pickett | Winnebago | Utica |
| Pike Lake | Marathon | Elderon/Reid |
| Pilsen | Kewaunee | Montpelier |
| Pine Bluff | Dane | Cross Plains |
| Pine Creek | Trempealeau | Dodge |
| Pine Grove | Brown | Ledgeview/Eaton/Glenmore/New Denmark |
| Pine River | Waushara | Leon |
| Pipe | Fond Du Lac | Calumet |
| Pipersville | Jefferson | Ixonia |
| Plainville | Adams | Dell Prairie |
| Plat | Washington | Richfield |
| Pleasant Ridge | Iowa | Dodgeville |
| Pleasantville | Trempealeau | Hale |
| Plugtown | Crawford | Scott |
| Poland | Brown | Eaton |
| Polar | Langlade | Polar |
| Polley | Taylor | Ford |
| Polonia | Portage | Sharon |
| Poniatowski | Marathon | Rietbrook |
| Popple River | Forest | Popple River |
| Porcupine | Pepin | Frankfort |
| Port Andrew | Richland | Richwood |
| Port Wing | Bayfield | Port Wing |
| Porterfield | Marinette | Porterfield |
| Portland | Dodge/Jefferson | Portland/Waterloo |
| Portland | Monroe | Portland |
| Poskin | Barron | Clinton |
| Postville | Green | York |
| Powers Lake | Kenosha | Randall/Wheatland |
| Poy Sippi | Waushara | Poy Sippi |
| Praag | Buffalo | Lincoln |
| Pray | Jackson | City Point |
| Presque Isle | Vilas | Presque Isle |
| Price | Jackson | Garfield |
| Pulcifer | Shawano | Green Valley |
| Purdy | Vernon | Sterling |
| Quinney | Calumet | Stockbridge |
| Range | Polk | Apple River/Beaver |
| Rankin | Kewaunee | Ahnapee |
| Readfield | Waupaca | Caledonia |
| Red Cliff | Bayfield | Russell |
| Red Mound | Vernon | Wheatland |
| Red River | Shawano | Richmond |
| Reeve | Barron | Vance Creek |
| Reserve | Sawyer | Bass Lake |
| Retreat | Vernon | Sterling |
| Rhine Center | Sheboygan | Rhine |
| Richardson | Polk | Clayton |
| Richford | Waushara | Richford |
| Richmond | Walworth | Richmond |
| Richwood | Dodge | Shields |
| Riley | Dane | Springdale |
| Ring | Winnebago | Nekimi |
| Ringle | Marathon | Ringle |
| Rio Creek | Kewaunee | Casco/Lincoln |
| Riplinger | Clark | Unity |
| Rising Sun | Crawford | Utica |
| Riverside | Burnett | Blaine |
| Rock Elm | Pierce | Rock Elm |
| Rock Falls | Dunn | Rock Creek |
| Rockbridge | Richland | Rockbridge |
| Rockton | Vernon | Whitestown |
| Rockville | Grant | Potosi |
| Rockville | Manitowoc | Schleswig |
| Rockwood | Manitowoc | Kossuth |
| Rolling Ground | Crawford | Clayton |
| Rolling Prairie | Dodge | Oak Grove |
| Romance | Vernon | Genoa |
| Rome | Adams | Rome |
| Rome | Jefferson | Sullivan |
| Rose Lawn | Shawano | Maple Grove |
| Rosecrans | Manitowoc | Cooperstown |
| Rosiere | Door/Kewaunee | Brussels/Lincoln |
| Ross | Vernon | Liberty |
| Rostok | Kewaunee | Pierce |
| Rowleys Bay | Door | Liberty Grove |
| Roxbury | Dane | Roxbury |
| Royalton | Waupaca | Royalton |
| Roys Point | Bayfield | Bayfield |
| Rozellville | Marathon | Day |
| Rubicon | Dodge | Rubicon |
| Rural | Waupaca | Dayton |
| Rush Lake | Winnebago | Nepeuskun |
| Rusk | Dunn | Red Cedar |
| Russell | Trempealeau | Chimney Rock |
| Sabin | Richland | Sylvan |
| Sampson | Oconto | Morgan |
| Sanborn | Ashland | White River |
| Sand Bay | Bayfield | Russell |
| Sand Creek | Dunn | Sand Creek |
| Sandusky | Sauk | Washington |
| Sarona | Washburn | Sarona |
| Saxeville | Waushara | Saxeville |
| Saxon | Iron | Saxon |
| Saylesville | Dodge | Rubicon |
| Saylesville | Waukesha | Genesee |
| Sayner | Vilas | Plum Lake |
| School Hill | Manitowoc | Meeme |
| Sechlerville | Jackson | Hixton |
| Seeley | Sawyer | Lenroot |
| Seneca | Crawford | Seneca |
| Sextonville | Richland | Buena Vista |
| Seymour Corners | Lafayette | Seymour |
| Shamrock | Jackson | Manchester |
| Shantytown | Marathon | Bevent |
| Shennington | Monroe | Byron |
| Shepley | Shawano | Almon/Birnamwood |
| Sheridan | Waupaca | Farmington |
| Sherry | Wood | Sherry |
| Shirley | Brown | Glenmore |
| Shopiere | Rock | Turtle |
| Shortville | Clark | Washburn |
| Shoto | Manitowoc | Two Rivers |
| Sidney | Clark | Pine Valley |
| Silver Creek | Sheboygan | Sherman |
| Sinsinawa | Grant | Hazel Green |
| Slab City | Shawano | Hartland |
| Slades Corners | Kenosha | Wheatland |
| Slovan | Kewaunee | Casco |
| Sobieski | Oconto | Little Suamico |
| South Beaver Dam | Dodge | Calamus |
| South Byron | Fond Du Lac | Byron |
| South Randolph | Dodge | Westford |
| South Range | Douglas | Parkland |
| Spirit Falls | Lincoln | Tomahawk |
| Spirit | Price | Spirit |
| Split Rock | Shawano | Fairbanks |
| Spokeville | Clark | Sherman |
| Sprague | Juneau | Necedah |
| Spread Eagle | Florence | Florence |
| Spring Lake | Waushara | Marion |
| Spring Prairie | Walworth | Spring Prairie |
| Spring Valley | Manitowoc | Meeme |
| Springbrook | Washburn | Springbrook |
| Springfield Corners | Dane | Springfield |
| Springfield | Walworth | Lyons |
| Springstead | Iron | Sherman |
| Springville | Vernon | Jefferson |
| St. Anna | Calumet/Sheboygan | New Holstein/Russell |
| St. Germain | Vilas | St. Germain |
| St. John | Calumet | Woodville |
| St. Joseph | Lacrosse | Greenfield |
| St. Lawrence | Washington | Addison/Hartford |
| St. Mary's | Monroe | Jefferson |
| St. Michaels | Washington | Farmington |
| St. Peter | Fond Du Lac | Taycheedah |
| Stanberry | Washburn | Stinnett |
| Stangelville | Kewaunee | Franklin |
| Star Lake | Vilas | Plum Lake |
| Starks | Oneida | Stella |
| Steinthal | Manitowoc | Eaton |
| Stephensville | Outagamie | Ellington |
| Stevenstown | Lacrosse | Farmington |
| Stiles | Oconto | Stiles |
| Stitzer | Grant | Liberty |
| Stone Bank | Waukesha | Merton |
| Stone Lake | Sawyer | Sand Lake |
| Sugar Bush | Brown | Humboldt |
| Sugar Bush | Outagamie | Maple Creek |
| Sugar Camp | Oneida | Sugar Camp |
| Sugar Grove | Vernon | Kickapoo |
| Sugar Island | Dodge | Lebanon |
| Summit Lake | Langlade | Upham |
| Symco | Waupaca | Union |
| Taegesville | Marathon | Berlin/Maine |
| Tamarack | Trempealeau | Arcadia |
| Taus | Manitowoc | Franklin |
| Taycheedah | Fond du Lac | Taycheedah |
| Tell | Buffalo | Alma |
| Theresa Station | Dodge | Theresa |
| Thiry Daems | Kewaunee | Red River |
| Thompson | Washington | Erin |
| Thornton | Shawano | Richmond |
| Three Lakes | Oneida | Three Lakes |
| Tibbets | Walworth | Sugar Creek |
| Tichigan | Racine | Waterford |
| Tiffany | Rock | La Prairie/Turtle |
| Tilden | Chippewa | Tilden |
| Tilleda | Shawano | Seneca |
| Tipler | Florence | Tipler |
| Tisch Mills | Kewaunee/Manitowoc | Carlton/Mishicot |
| Token Creek | Dane | Burke |
| Tonet | Kewaunee | Luxemburg/Red River |
| Towerville | Crawford | Utica |
| Townsend | Oconto | Townsend |
| Trade Lake | Burnett | Trade Lake |
| Trade River | Burnett | Anderson |
| Trego | Washburn | Trego |
| Trevor | Kenosha | Salem Lakes |
| Trimbelle | Pierce | Trimbelle |
| Tripoli | Lincoln/Oneida | Somo/Lynne |
| Trippville | Vernon | Hillsboro |
| Troy Center | Walworth | Troy |
| Truman | Lafayette | Kendall |
| Tunnel City | Monroe | Greenfield |
| Tuscobia | Barron | Oak Grove |
| Tustin | Waushara | Bloomfield |
| Twin Bluffs | Richland | Orion |
| Twin Grove | Green | Jefferson |
| Two Creeks | Manitowoc | Two Creeks |
| Tyrone | Green | Spring Grove |
| Ubet | Polk | Garfield |
| Underhill | Oconto | Underhill |
| Union Church | Racine | Norway/Raymond |
| Union | Grant | Lima |
| Upson | Iron | Anderson |
| Urne | Buffalo | Nelson |
| Utica | Dane | Christiana |
| Valley Junction | Monroe | Byron |
| Valley | Vernon | Forest |
| Valmy | Door | Sevastopol |
| Valton | Sauk | Woodland |
| Van Dyne | Fond Du Lac | Friendship |
| Victory | Vernon | Wheatland |
| Vienna | Walworth | Spring Prairie |
| Wabeno | Forest | Wabeno |
| Waino | Douglas | Brule |
| Walhain | Kewaunee | Luxemburg |
| Wanderoos | Polk | Garfield |
| Wascott | Douglas | Wascott |
| Washington | Door | Washington Island |
| Waterville | Waukesha | Summit |
| Waubeka | Ozaukee | Fredonia |
| Waucousta | Fond Du Lac | Osceola |
| Waukau | Winnebago | Rushford |
| Waumandee | Buffalo | Waumandee |
| Wayne | Washington | Wayne |
| Wayside | Brown | Morrison |
| Webb Lake | Burnett | Webb Lake |
| Wentworth | Douglas | Amnicon |
| Werley | Grant | Mount Ida |
| West Bloomfield | Waushara | Bloomfield |
| West La Crosse | Lacrosse | Campbell |
| West Lima | Richland | Bloom |
| West Prairie | Vernon | Sterling |
| West Rosendale | Fond du Lac | Rosendale |
| Westboro | Taylor | Westboro |
| Weston | Dunn | Weston |
| White Creek | Adams | Quincy |
| Whittlesey | Taylor | Chelsea |
| Willard | Clark | Hendren |
| Wilmot | Kenosha | Salem Lakes |
| Wilson | Eau Claire | Wilson |
| Winchester | Vilas | Winchester |
| Winchester | Winnebago | Winchester |
| Wind Lake | Racine | Norway |
| Winnebago Mission | Jackson | Komensky |
| Winnebago | Winnebago | Oshkosh |
| Wiota | Lafayette | Wiota |
| Witwen | Sauk | Troy |
| Wolf Creek | Polk | Sterling |
| Woodboro | Oneida | Woodboro |
| Woodford | Lafayette | Wiota |
| Woodhull | Fond Du Lac | Lamartine |
| Woodland | Dodge | Herman |
| Woodruff | Oneida | Woodruff |
| Woodstock | Richland | Henrietta |
| Woodworth | Kenosha | Bristol |
| Wyalusing | Grant | Wyalusing |
| Yarnell | Sawyer | Edgewater |
| Yellow Lake | Burnett | Oakland |
| York Center | Dane | York |
| York | Jackson | Northfield |
| Young America | Washington | Barton |
| Zachow | Shawano | Angelica |
| Zenda | Walworth | Linn |
| Zion | Winnebago | Omro |
| Zittau | Winnebago | Wolf River |

== See also ==
- List of unincorporated communities in Dunn County, Wisconsin
- List of unincorporated communities in Eau Claire County, Wisconsin
- List of ghost towns in Wisconsin
- List of census-designated places in Wisconsin
- List of villages in Wisconsin
- List of towns in Wisconsin
- List of cities in Wisconsin
- Neighborhoods of Milwaukee
