= Hull, Wisconsin =

Hull is the name of some places in the U.S. state of Wisconsin:

- Hull, Marathon County, Wisconsin, a town
- Hull, Portage County, Wisconsin, a town
