= Washington (community), Wisconsin =

Washington, Wisconsin
- Unincorporated community
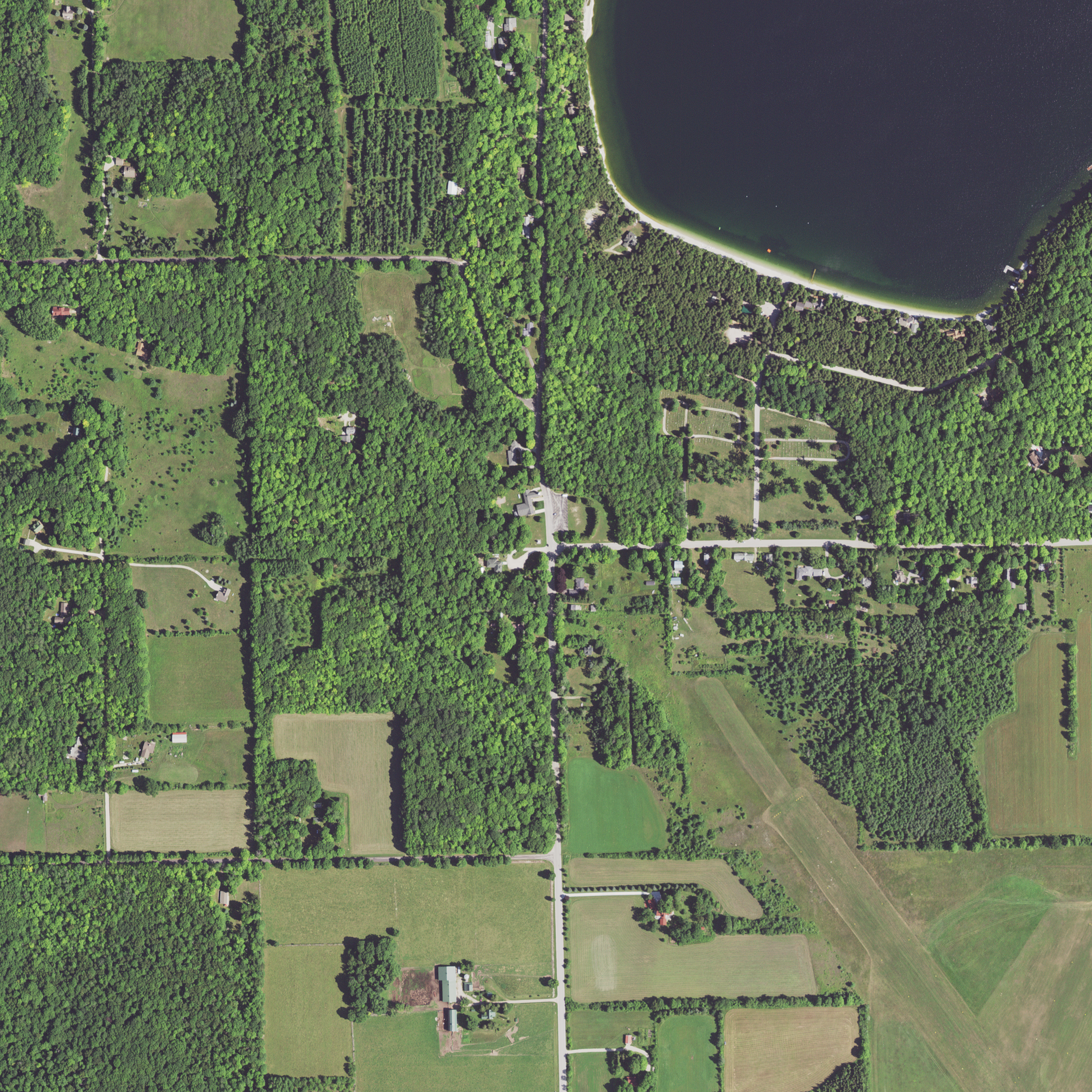
- Aerial view showing Main Road intersecting Jackson Harbor Road. County Trunk Highway W (CTH-W) follows Little Lake Road (upper left), which curves south to join Main Road. Washington Harbor is at the upper right.

- Location within Wisconsin Location within the United States
- Coordinates: 45°23′41″N 86°55′53″W
- Country: United States
- State: Wisconsin
- County: Door
- Town: Washington Island
- Elevation: 676 ft (206 m)
- Time zone: UTC-6 (Central (CST))
  - Summer (DST): UTC-5 (CDT)
- Area code: 920
- GNIS feature ID: 1576235

Washington is an unincorporated community located within the Town of Washington Island in Door County, Wisconsin, United States. It lies on the northern part of Washington Island, along County Highway W, near the shoreline of Washington Harbor. It is recognized as the northernmost community in Door County.

The community is home to Bethel Evangelical Free Church, which has served local residents for over a century and plays an active role in the island's religious and cultural life.

== See also ==
- List of unincorporated communities in Wisconsin
