= Sand Lake, Sawyer County, Wisconsin =

Sand Lake, Wisconsin
- Town
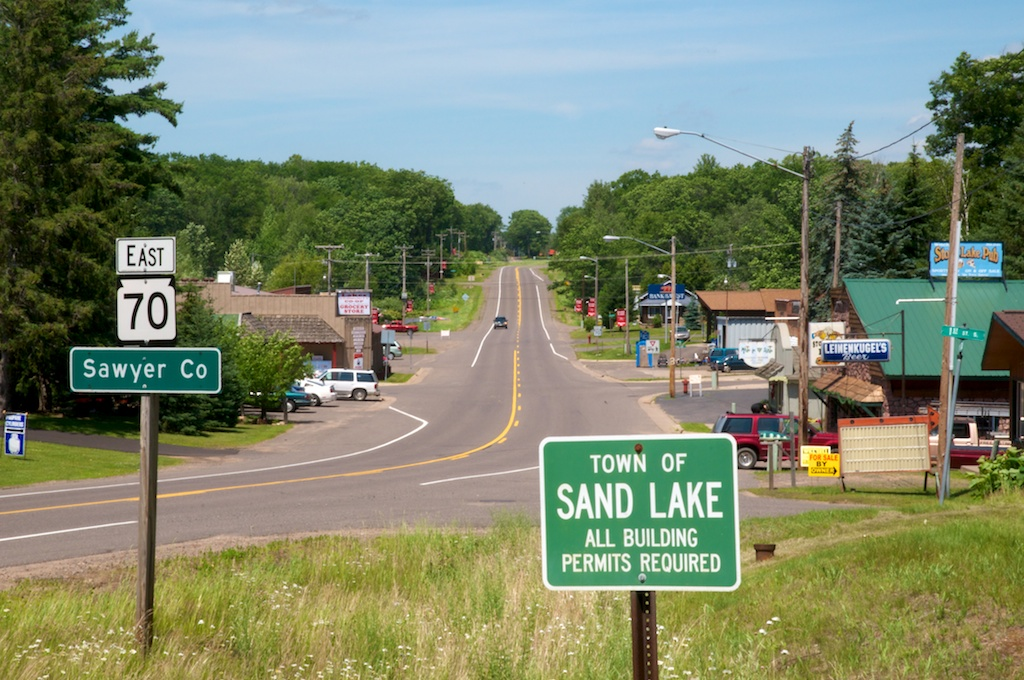
- Sand Lake, WI from Highway 70

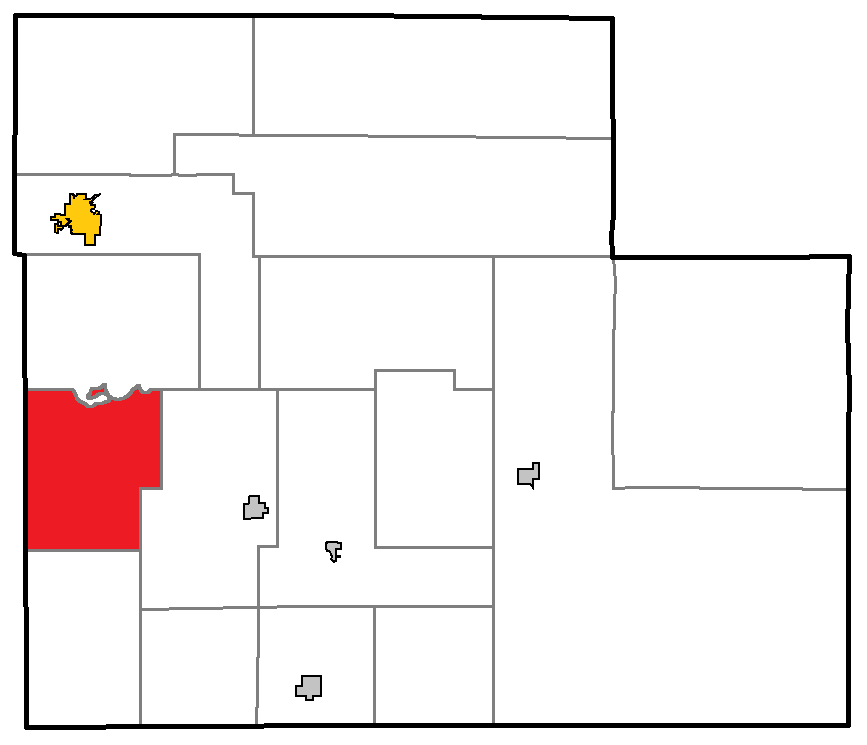
- Location of Sand Lake, within Sawyer County, Wisconsin
- Coordinates: 45°50′27″N 91°27′50″W
- Country: United States
- State: Wisconsin
- County: Sawyer

Area
  - Total: 51.5 sq mi (133.5 km^{2})
  - Land: 46.4 sq mi (120.1 km^{2})
  - Water: 5.2 sq mi (13.4 km^{2})
- Elevation: 1,342 ft (409 m)

Population (2020)
  - Total: 901
  - Density: 19.4/sq mi (7.50/km^{2})
- Time zone: UTC-6 (Central (CST))
  - Summer (DST): UTC-5 (CDT)
- Area codes: 715 & 534
- FIPS code: 55-71500
- GNIS feature ID: 1584099

Sand Lake is a town in Sawyer County, Wisconsin, United States. The population was 901 at the 2020 census. The census-designated place of Stone Lake is located partially in the town. The unincorporated community of Hauer is also located in the town.

== Geography ==
According to the United States Census Bureau, the town has a total area of 51.6 square miles (133.5 km^{2}), of which 46.4 square miles (120.1 km^{2}) is land and 5.2 square miles (13.4 km^{2}) (10.07%) is water.

== Demographics ==
As of the census of 2000, there were 774 people, 347 households, and 229 families residing in the town. The population density was 16.7 people per square mile (6.4/km^{2}). There were 1,147 housing units at an average density of 24.7 per square mile (9.5/km^{2}). The racial makeup of the town was 83.98% White, 14.86% Native American, 0.13% Asian, 0.26% from other races, and 0.78% from two or more races. Hispanic or Latino of any race were 0.65% of the population.

There were 347 households, out of which 18.2% had children under the age of 18 living with them, 55.3% were married couples living together, 6.9% had a female householder with no husband present, and 34.0% were non-families. 29.1% of all households were made up of individuals, and 14.7% had someone living alone who was 65 years of age or older. The average household size was 2.23 and the average family size was 2.70.

In the town, the population was spread out, with 18.5% under the age of 18, 6.6% from 18 to 24, 20.2% from 25 to 44, 30.0% from 45 to 64, and 24.8% who were 65 years of age or older. The median age was 49 years. For every 100 females, there were 112.1 males. For every 100 females age 18 and over, there were 110.3 males.

The median income for a household in the town was $32,266, and the median income for a family was $37,500. Males had a median income of $28,482 versus $25,714 for females. The per capita income for the town was $18,322. About 6.3% of families and 11.3% of the population were below the poverty line, including 11.4% of those under age 18 and 7.5% of those age 65 or over.
