= Lincoln, Monroe County, Wisconsin =

Town of Lincoln
- Town
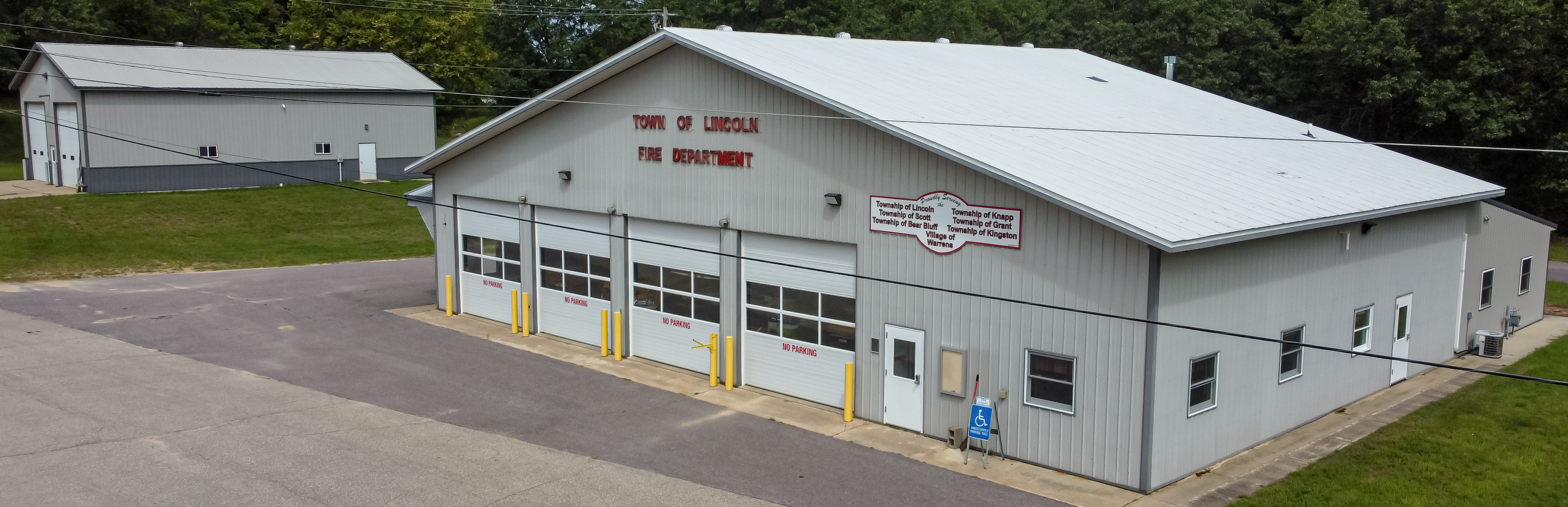
- Town of Lincoln town hall and fire department

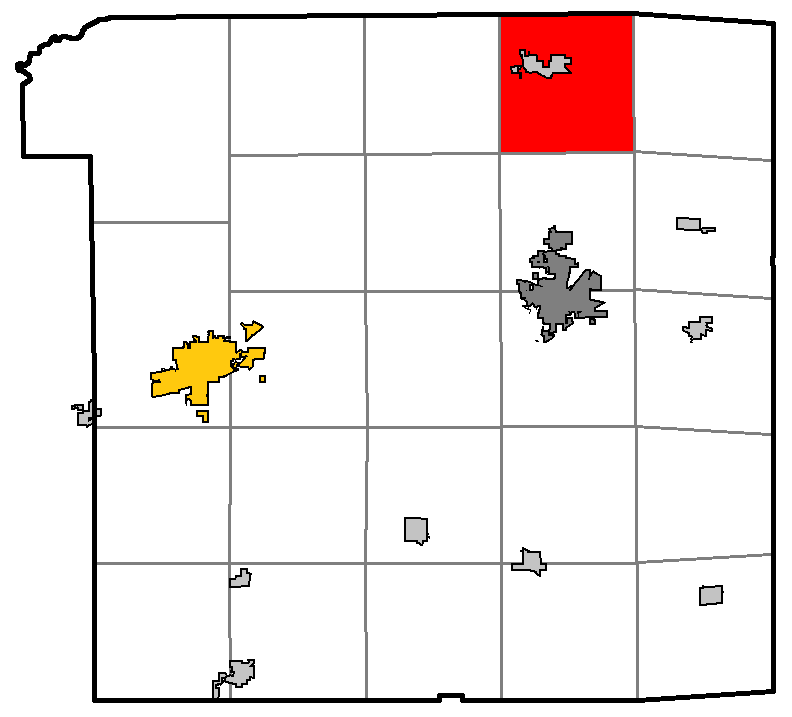
- Location of the Town of Lincoln, Monroe County

- Location of Monroe County, Wisconsin
- Coordinates: 44°7′25″N 90°29′39″W
- Country: United States
- State: Wisconsin
- County: Monroe

Area
  - Total: 34.9 sq mi (90.3 km^{2})
  - Land: 34.1 sq mi (88.2 km^{2})
  - Water: 0.81 sq mi (2.1 km^{2})
- Elevation: 988 ft (301 m)

Population (2020)
  - Total: 793
  - Density: 23.3/sq mi (8.99/km^{2})
- Time zone: UTC-6 (Central (CST))
  - Summer (DST): UTC-5 (CDT)
- Area code: 608
- FIPS code: 55-44450
- GNIS feature ID: 1583567
- Website: https://www.townoflincoln.net/

Lincoln is a town in Monroe County, Wisconsin, United States. The population was 793 at the 2020 census. The unincorporated community of Kirby is located in the town.

== Geography ==
According to the United States Census Bureau, the town has a total area of 34.9 square miles (90.3 km^{2}), of which 34.0 square miles (88.2 km^{2}) is land and 0.8 square mile (2.1 km^{2}) (2.38%) is water.

== Demographics ==
As of the census of 2000, there were 827 people, 318 households, and 235 families residing in the town. The population density was 24.3 people per square mile (9.4/km^{2}). There were 365 housing units at an average density of 10.7 per square mile (4.1/km^{2}). The racial makeup of the town was 98.19% White, 0.24% African American, 0.73% Native American, 0.12% Asian, 0.60% from other races, and 0.12% from two or more races. Hispanic or Latino of any race were 0.85% of the population.

There were 318 households, out of which 38.4% had children under the age of 18 living with them, 62.3% were married couples living together, 7.2% had a female householder with no husband present, and 26.1% were non-families. 21.4% of all households were made up of individuals, and 5.7% had someone living alone who was 65 years of age or older. The average household size was 2.60 and the average family size was 3.07.

In the town, the population was spread out, with 28.2% under the age of 18, 6.2% from 18 to 24, 30.6% from 25 to 44, 23.8% from 45 to 64, and 11.2% who were 65 years of age or older. The median age was 37 years. For every 100 females, there were 107.8 males. For every 100 females age 18 and over, there were 111.4 males.

The median income for a household in the town was $37,422, and the median income for a family was $45,000. Males had a median income of $29,464 versus $22,986 for females. The per capita income for the town was $17,286. About 6.0% of families and 8.8% of the population were below the poverty line, including 11.3% of those under age 18 and 2.2% of those age 65 or over.
