= Franklin, Vernon County, Wisconsin =

Franklin, Wisconsin
- Town
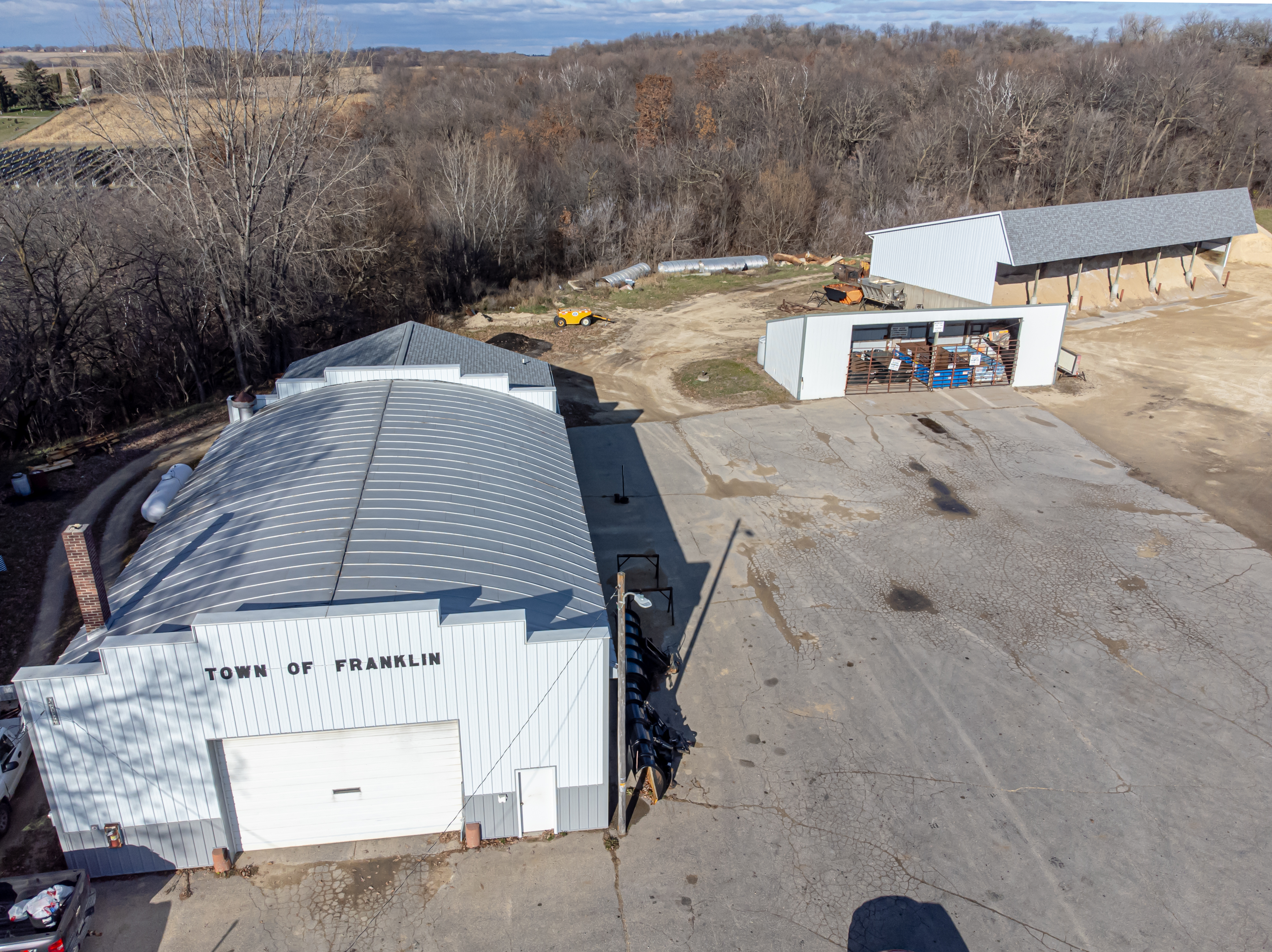
- Town of Franklin town hall

- Location in Vernon County and the state of Wisconsin.
- Coordinates: 43°29′2″N 90°53′41″W
- Country: United States
- State: Wisconsin
- County: Vernon

Area
  - Total: 51.6 sq mi (133.6 km^{2})
  - Land: 51.5 sq mi (133.5 km^{2})
  - Water: 0.039 sq mi (0.1 km^{2})
- Elevation: 1,158 ft (353 m)

Population (2020)
  - Total: 1,106
  - Density: 21.46/sq mi (8.285/km^{2})
- Time zone: UTC-6 (Central (CST))
  - Summer (DST): UTC-5 (CDT)
- Area code: 608
- FIPS code: 55-27400
- GNIS feature ID: 1583236

Franklin is a town in Vernon County, Wisconsin, United States. The population was 1,106 at the 2020 census. The unincorporated communities of Fargo, Folsom, and Liberty Pole are located in the town.

== Geography ==
According to the United States Census Bureau, the town has a total area of 51.6 square miles (133.6 km^{2}), of which 51.5 square miles (133.5 km^{2}) is land and 0.04 square mile (0.1 km^{2}) (0.08%) is water.

== Demographics ==
As of the census of 2000, there were 923 people, 324 households, and 246 families residing in the town. The population density was 17.9 people per square mile (6.9/km^{2}). There were 382 housing units at an average density of 7.4 per square mile (2.9/km^{2}). The racial makeup of the town was 99.02% White, 0.11% African American, 0.22% Asian, and 0.65% from two or more races. Hispanic or Latino of any race were 0.76% of the population.

There were 324 households, out of which 37.3% had children under the age of 18 living with them, 67.0% were married couples living together, 5.2% had a female householder with no husband present, and 23.8% were non-families. 21.0% of all households were made up of individuals, and 8.3% had someone living alone who was 65 years of age or older. The average household size was 2.85 and the average family size was 3.35.

In the town, the population was spread out, with 33.9% under the age of 18, 4.8% from 18 to 24, 28.3% from 25 to 44, 22.8% from 45 to 64, and 10.3% who were 65 years of age or older. The median age was 35 years. For every 100 females, there were 109.3 males. For every 100 females age 18 and over, there were 111.1 males.

The median income for a household in the town was $32,931, and the median income for a family was $34,511. Males had a median income of $24,861 versus $19,306 for females. The per capita income for the town was $12,850. About 14.5% of families and 21.2% of the population were below the poverty line, including 35.3% of those under age 18 and 11.7% of those age 65 or over.
