= Richford, Wisconsin =

- Town
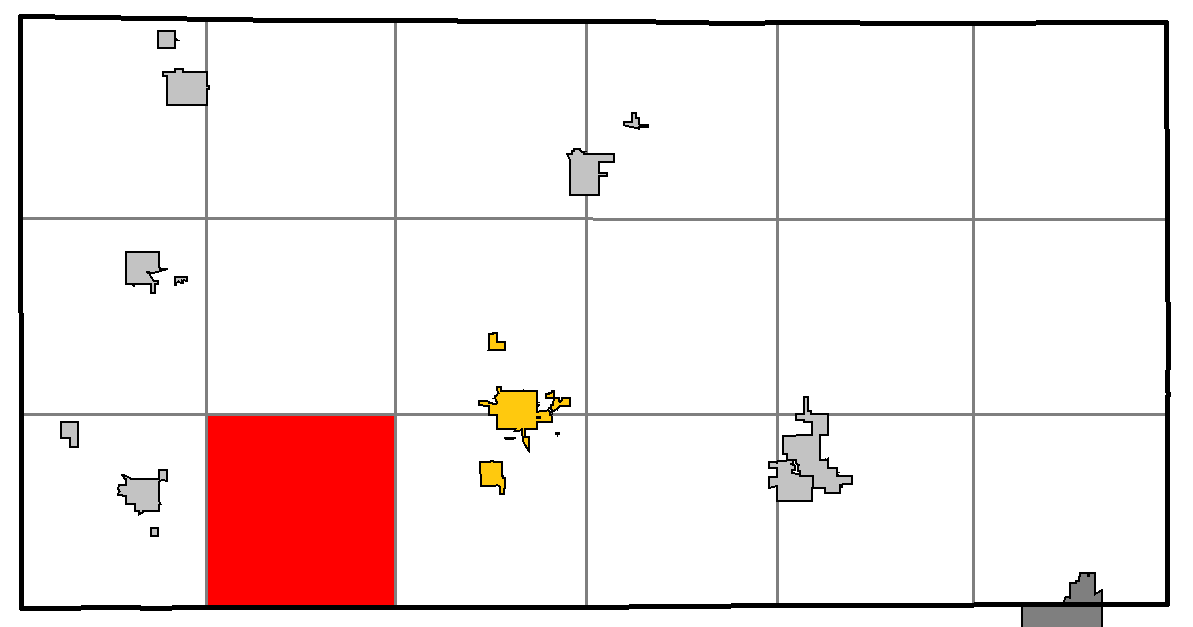
- Location of Richford, Wisconsin

- Location of Waushara County, Wisconsin
- Coordinates: 44°1′27″N 89°25′49″W
- Country: United States
- State: Wisconsin
- County: Waushara

Area
  - Total: 34.7 sq mi (89.9 km^{2})
  - Land: 34.6 sq mi (89.5 km^{2})
  - Water: 0.15 sq mi (0.4 km^{2})
- Elevation: 902 ft (275 m)

Population (2020)
  - Total: 737
  - Density: 21.3/sq mi (8.23/km^{2})
- Time zone: UTC-6 (Central (CST))
  - Summer (DST): UTC-5 (CDT)
- FIPS code: 55-67550
- GNIS feature ID: 1584024
- Website: https://townofrichfordwi.gov/

Richford is a town in Waushara County, Wisconsin, United States. The population was 737 at the 2020 census.

== Geography ==
According to the United States Census Bureau, the town has a total area of 34.7 square miles (90.0 km^{2}), of which 34.6 square miles (89.5 km^{2}) is land and 0.2 square mile (0.4 km^{2}) (0.46%) is water.

== Demographics ==
As of the census of 2000, there were 588 people, 190 households, and 158 families residing in the town. The population density was 17.0 people per square mile (6.6/km^{2}). There were 281 housing units at an average density of 8.1 per square mile (3.1/km^{2}). The racial makeup of the town was 94.90% White, 1.19% African American, 0.85% Native American, 0.85% Pacific Islander, 2.04% from other races, and 0.17% from two or more races. Hispanic or Latino of any race were 4.08% of the population.

There were 190 households, out of which 33.7% had children under the age of 18 living with them, 74.2% were married couples living together, 5.3% had a female householder with no husband present, and 16.8% were non-families. 13.7% of all households were made up of individuals, and 6.8% had someone living alone who was 65 years of age or older. The average household size was 3.09 and the average family size was 3.42.

In the town, the population was spread out, with 33.5% under the age of 18, 7.3% from 18 to 24, 23.6% from 25 to 44, 21.8% from 45 to 64, and 13.8% who were 65 years of age or older. The median age was 37 years. For every 100 females, there were 104.9 males. For every 100 females age 18 and over, there were 102.6 males.

The median income for a household in the town was $37,656, and the median income for a family was $38,929. Males had a median income of $31,719 versus $19,167 for females. The per capita income for the town was $14,503. About 14.3% of families and 22.4% of the population were below the poverty line, including 38.6% of those under age 18 and 9.2% of those age 65 or over.
