= Frog Creek, Wisconsin =

Town in Wisconsin, United States

- Town
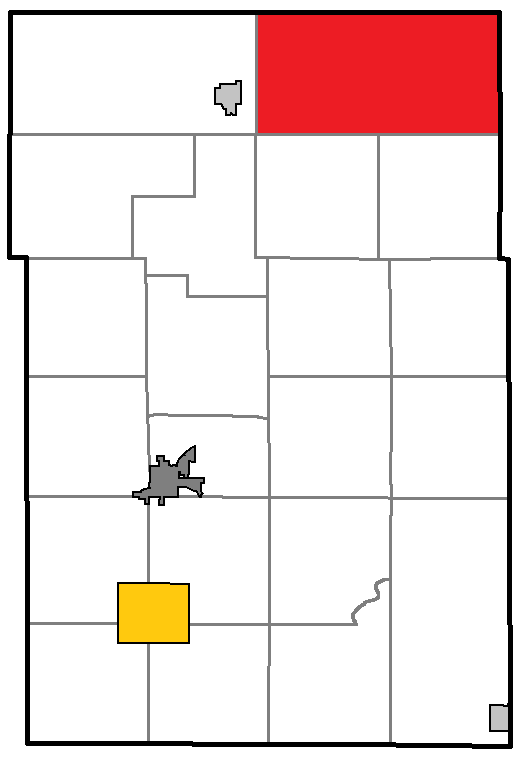
- Location of Frog Creek, within Washburn County
- Coordinates: 46°7′24″N 91°42′46″W
- Country: United States
- State: Wisconsin
- County: Washburn

Area
  - Total: 71.5 sq mi (185.3 km^{2})
  - Land: 71.0 sq mi (183.9 km^{2})
  - Water: 0.54 sq mi (1.4 km^{2})
- Elevation: 1,120 ft (340 m)

Population (2020)
  - Total: 127
  - Density: 1.79/sq mi (0.691/km^{2})
- Time zone: UTC-6 (Central (CST))
  - Summer (DST): UTC-5 (CDT)
- Area codes: 715 & 534
- FIPS code: 55-28025
- GNIS feature ID: 1583251

Frog Creek is a town in Washburn County, Wisconsin, United States. The population was 127 at the 2020 census. The unincorporated community of Chittamo is located in the town.

== Geography ==
According to the United States Census Bureau, the town has a total area of 71.6 square miles (185.3 km^{2}), of which 71.0 square miles (183.9 km^{2}) is land and 0.6 square mile (1.5 km^{2}) (0.78%) is water.

== Demographics ==
As of the census of 2000, there were 160 people, 65 households, and 44 families residing in the town. The population density was 2.3 people per square mile (0.9/km^{2}). There were 86 housing units at an average density of 1.2 per square mile (0.5/km^{2}). The racial makeup of the town was 98.75% White and 1.25% from two or more races.

There were 65 households, out of which 30.8% had children under the age of 18 living with them, 56.9% were married couples living together, 4.6% had a female householder with no husband present, and 32.3% were non-families. 27.7% of all households were made up of individuals, and 3.1% had someone living alone who was 65 years of age or older. The average household size was 2.46 and the average family size was 2.91.

In the town, the population was spread out, with 29.4% under the age of 18, 3.1% from 18 to 24, 32.5% from 25 to 44, 28.1% from 45 to 64, and 6.9% who were 65 years of age or older. The median age was 34 years. For every 100 females, there were 116.2 males. For every 100 females age 18 and over, there were 105.5 males.

The median income for a household in the town was $36,750, and the median income for a family was $42,000. Males had a median income of $38,750 versus $20,625 for females. The per capita income for the town was $15,750. About 3.6% of families and 7.3% of the population were below the poverty line, including 4.4% of those under the age of eighteen and none of those 65 or over.
