= Stone Lake (CDP), Wisconsin =

Census-designated place in Wisconsin, United States

Stone Lake, Wisconsin
- Census-designated place
- Location within Wisconsin
- Coordinates: 45°50′44″N 91°32′26″W
- Country: United States
- State: Wisconsin
- Counties: Sawyer and Washburn

Area
  - Total: 1.774 sq mi (4.59 km^{2})
  - Land: 0.940 sq mi (2.43 km^{2})
  - Water: 0.834 sq mi (2.16 km^{2})
- Elevation: 1,316 ft (401 m)

Population (2020)
  - Total: 186
  - Density: 198/sq mi (76.4/km^{2})
- Time zone: UTC-6 (Central (CST))
  - Summer (DST): UTC-5 (CDT)
- Area codes: 715 & 534
- GNIS feature ID: 1574928

Stone Lake is an unincorporated census-designated place in Sawyer and Washburn counties, Wisconsin, United States. Stone Lake is located on the eastern shore of Stone Lake and along Wisconsin Highway 70, 12 miles (19 km) west-northwest of Couderay. The Sawyer County portion of the community is located in the town of Sand Lake, while the Washburn County portion is located in the town of Stone Lake. As of the 2020 census, its population is 186.

Historical population
Census	Pop.	Note	%±
2010	178		—
2020	186		4.5%
U.S. Decennial Census
