= McKinley, Polk County, Wisconsin =

Town of McKinley
- Town
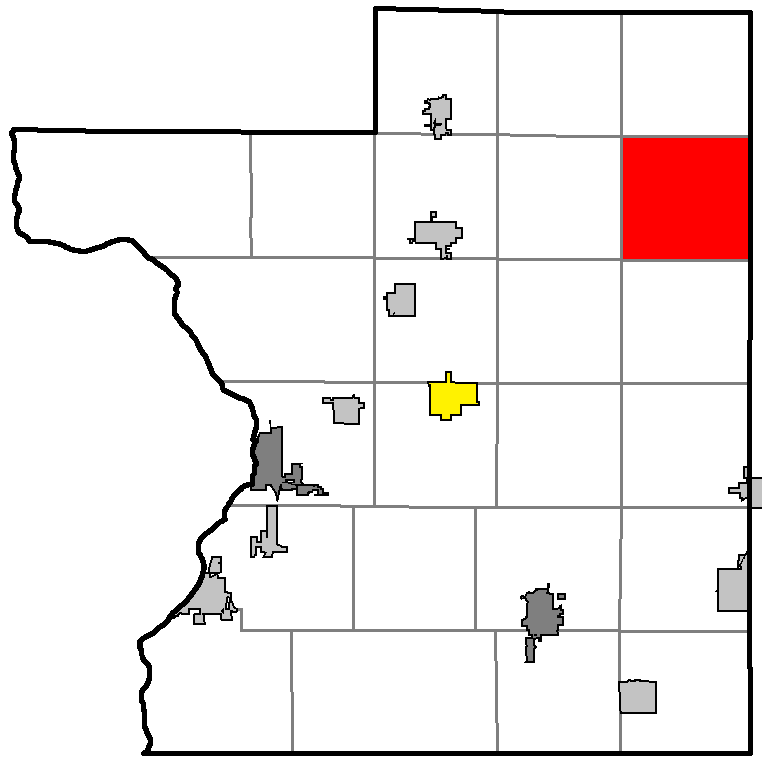
- Location of McKinley, within Polk County

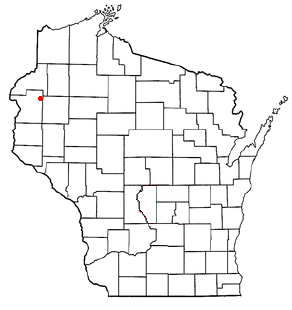
- Location of the Town of McKinley
- Coordinates: 45°34′32″N 92°13′39″W
- Country: United States
- State: Wisconsin
- County: Polk

Area
  - Total: 37.1 sq mi (96.2 km^{2})
  - Land: 36.0 sq mi (93.3 km^{2})
  - Water: 1.1 sq mi (2.9 km^{2})
- Elevation: 1,227 ft (374 m)

Population (2020)
  - Total: 340
  - Density: 9.4/sq mi (3.6/km^{2})
- Time zone: UTC-6 (Central (CST))
  - Summer (DST): UTC-5 (CDT)
- Area codes: 715 & 534
- FIPS code: 55-46900
- GNIS feature ID: 1583621

The Town of McKinley is located in Polk County, Wisconsin, United States. The population was 340 at the 2020 census.

== Geography ==
According to the United States Census Bureau, the town has a total area of 37.1 square miles (96.2 km^{2}), of which 36.0 square miles (93.3 km^{2}) is land and 1.1 square miles (2.9 km^{2}) (3.02%) is water.

== Demographics ==
As of the census of 2010, there were 347 people, 149 households, and 106 families residing in the town. The racial makeup of the town was 97.7% White, 1.4% Native American,0.6% Asian (all Chinese), and 0.3% African American. Hispanic or Latino of any race were 0.3% of the population.

The population density was 9.1 people per square mile (3.5/km^{2}). There were 223 housing units at an average density of 6.2 per square mile (2.4/km^{2}) as of 2000.

There were 130 households, out of which 25.4% had children under the age of 18 living with them, 64.6% were married couples living together, 6.9% had a female householder with no husband present, and 23.1% were non-families. 20.8% of all households were made up of individuals, and 5.4% had someone living alone who was 65 years of age or older. The average household size was 2.52 and the average family size was 2.91.

In the town, the population was spread out, with 24.1% under the age of 18, 4.9% from 18 to 24, 24.1% from 25 to 44, 30.8% from 45 to 64, and 16.2% who were 65 years of age or older. The median age was 44 years. For every 100 females, there were 124.7 males. For every 100 females age 18 and over, there were 114.7 males.

The median income for a household in the town was $37,083, and the median income for a family was $40,417. Males had a median income of $28,750 versus $23,500 for females. The per capita income for the town was $15,772. About 3.2% of families and 10.5% of the population were below the poverty line, including 16.9% of those under age 18 and none of those age 65 or over.
