= Star Prairie (town), Wisconsin =

Town in St. Croix County, Wisconsin

Star Prairie, Wisconsin
- Town
- Town of Star Prairie
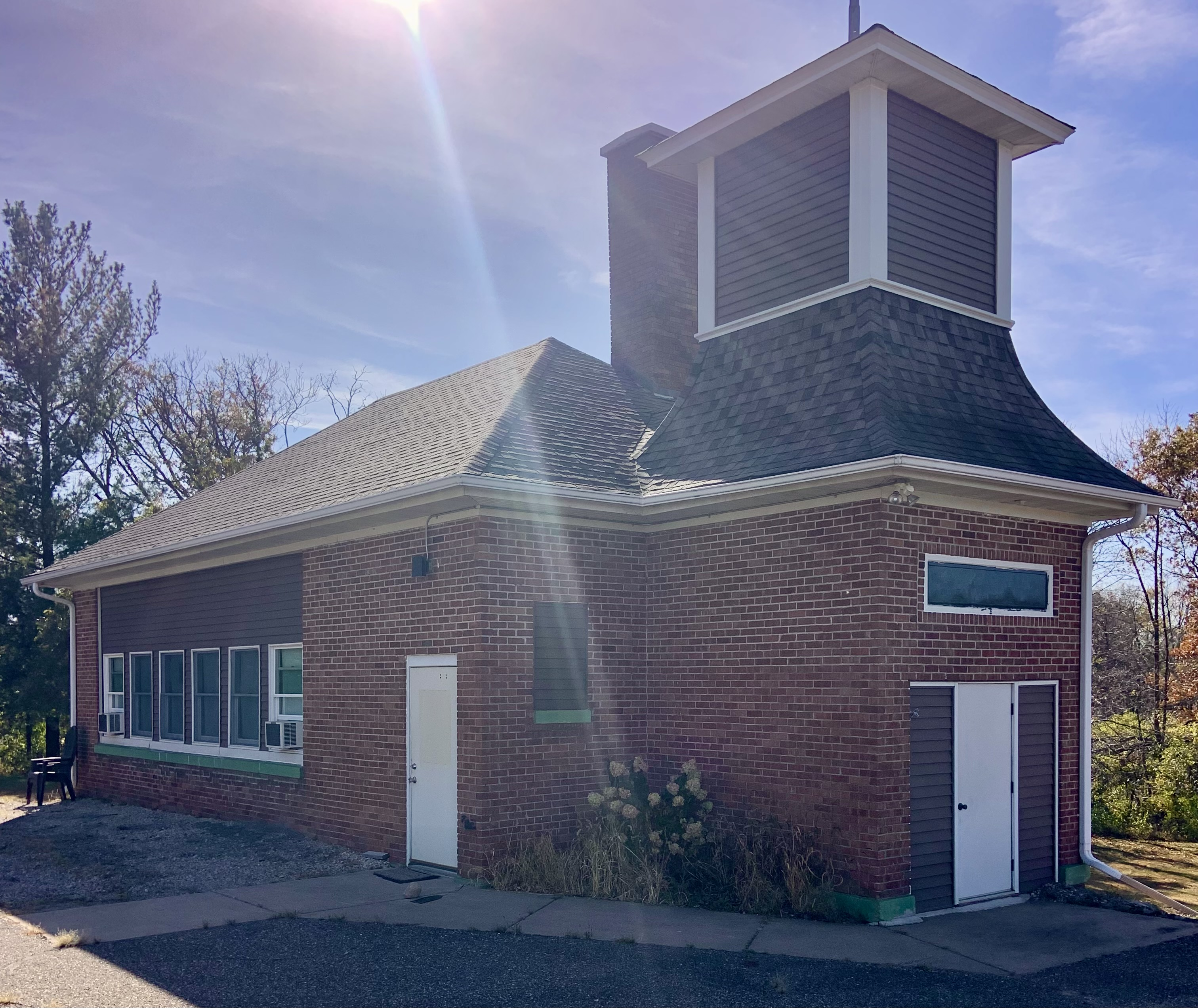
- Star Prairie Town Hall

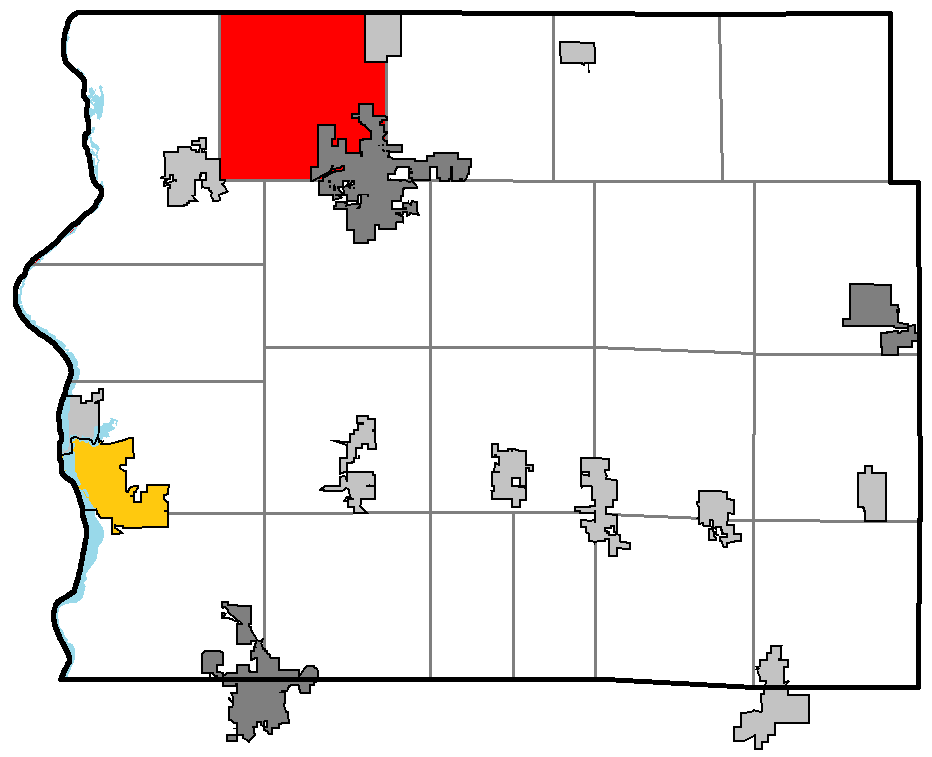
- Location of Star Prairie, within St. Croix County

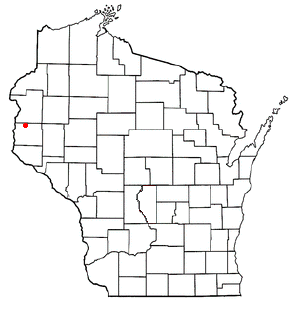
- Location of Star Prairie, Wisconsin
- Coordinates: 45°10′09″N 92°35′54″W
- Country: United States
- State: Wisconsin
- County: St. Croix

Area
  - Total: 30.41 sq mi (78.8 km^{2})
  - Land: 29.22 sq mi (75.7 km^{2})
  - Water: 1.19 sq mi (3.1 km^{2})

Population (2020)
  - Total: 3,733
  - Density: 127.8/sq mi (49.33/km^{2})
- Time zone: UTC-6 (Central (CST))
  - Summer (DST): UTC-5 (CDT)
- Area code(s): 715 and 534
- GNIS feature ID: 1584215

Star Prairie is a town in St. Croix County, Wisconsin, United States. The population was 3,733 at the 2020 census. The Village of Star Prairie is located on the eastern boundary of the town. The unincorporated communities of Huntington and Johannesburg are located in the town.

== Geography ==
According to the United States Census Bureau, the town has a total area of 32.7 square miles (84.7 km^{2}), of which 31.5 square miles (81.5 km^{2}) is land and 1.2 square miles (3.2 km^{2}) (3.79%) is water.

== Demographics ==
Historical population
Census	Pop.	Note	%±
2010	561		—
2020	3,733		565.4%

As of the census of 2000, there were 2,944 people, 1,006 households, and 777 families residing in the town. The population density was 93.6 inhabitants per square mile (36.1/km^{2}). There were 1,079 housing units at an average density of 34.3 per square mile (13.2/km^{2}). The racial makeup of the town was 96.71% White, 1.53% Black or African American, 0.44% Native American, 0.58% Asian, 0.03% Pacific Islander, 0.14% from other races, and 0.58% from two or more races. 0.82% of the population were Hispanic or Latino of any race.

There were 1,006 households, out of which 42.9% had children under the age of 18 living with them, 66.2% were married couples living together, 6.7% had a female householder with no husband present, and 22.7% were non-families. 17.6% of all households were made up of individuals, and 3.3% had someone living alone who was 65 years of age or older. The average household size was 2.82 and the average family size was 3.22.

In the town, the population was spread out, with 29.4% under the age of 18, 9.1% from 18 to 24, 34.6% from 25 to 44, 21.0% from 45 to 64, and 5.8% who were 65 years of age or older. The median age was 32 years. For every 100 females, there were 114.7 males. For every 100 females age 18 and over, there were 118.5 males.

The median income for a household in the town was $53,468, and the median income for a family was $58,796. Males had a median income of $41,013 versus $30,300 for females. The per capita income for the town was $21,052. About 4.6% of families and 5.7% of the population were below the poverty line, including 8.8% of those under age 18 and 7.9% of those age 65 or over.

== History ==
The town of Star Prairie, Wisconsin was founded on July 28, 1856.
