= Hale, Wisconsin =

- Town
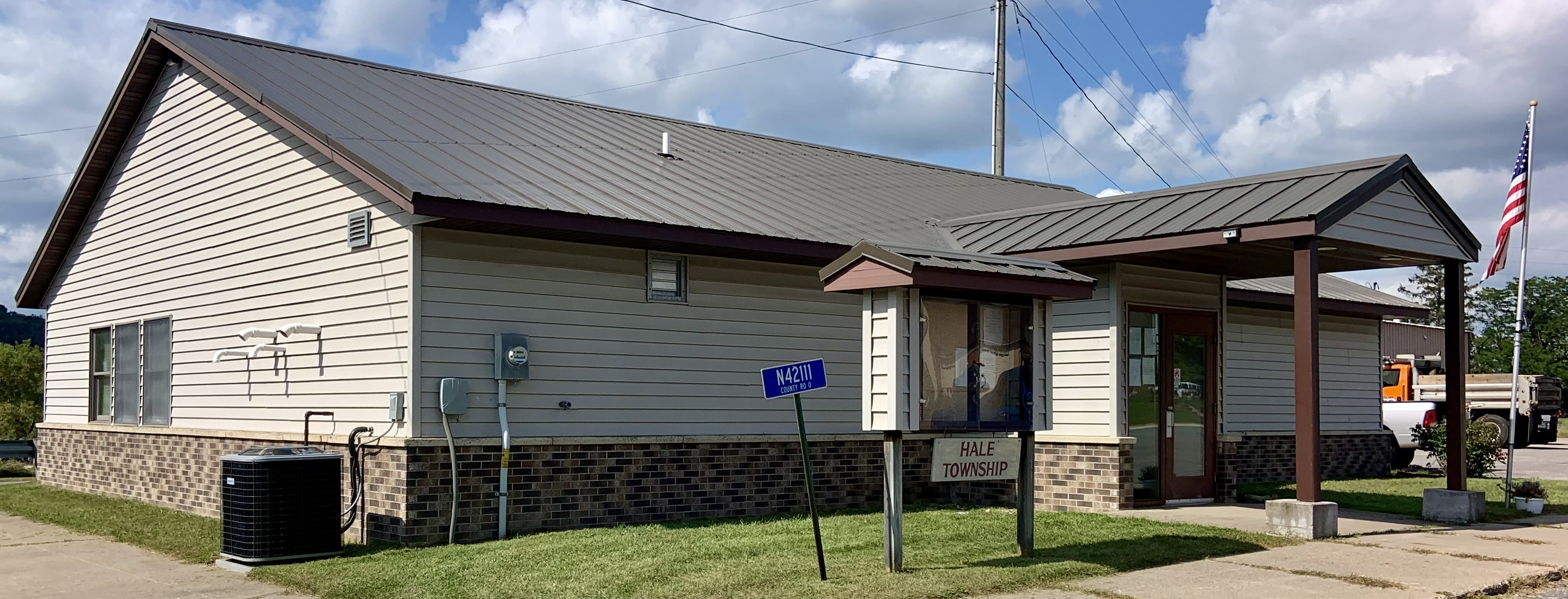
- Town hall in Hale

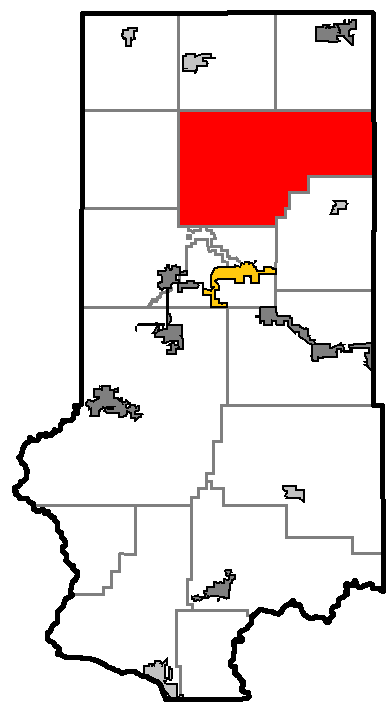
- Location of Hale, Trempealeau County

- Location of Trempealeau County, Wisconsin
- Coordinates: 44°28′28″N 91°18′20″W
- Country: United States
- State: Wisconsin
- County: Trempealeau

Area
  - Total: 69.7 sq mi (180.6 km^{2})
  - Land: 69.7 sq mi (180.5 km^{2})
  - Water: 0.039 sq mi (0.1 km^{2})
- Elevation: 890 ft (270 m)

Population (2020)
  - Total: 1,061
  - Density: 15.22/sq mi (5.878/km^{2})
- Time zone: UTC-6 (Central (CST))
  - Summer (DST): UTC-5 (CDT)
- FIPS code: 55-32050
- GNIS feature ID: 1583334

Hale is a town in Trempealeau County, Wisconsin, United States. The population was 1,061 at the 2020 census. The unincorporated communities of Elk Creek, Hale, and Pleasantville are located in the town.

== Geography ==
According to the United States Census Bureau, the town has a total area of 69.7 square miles (180.6 km^{2}), of which 69.7 square miles (180.5 km^{2}) is land and 0.04 square mile (0.1 km^{2}) (0.04%) is water.

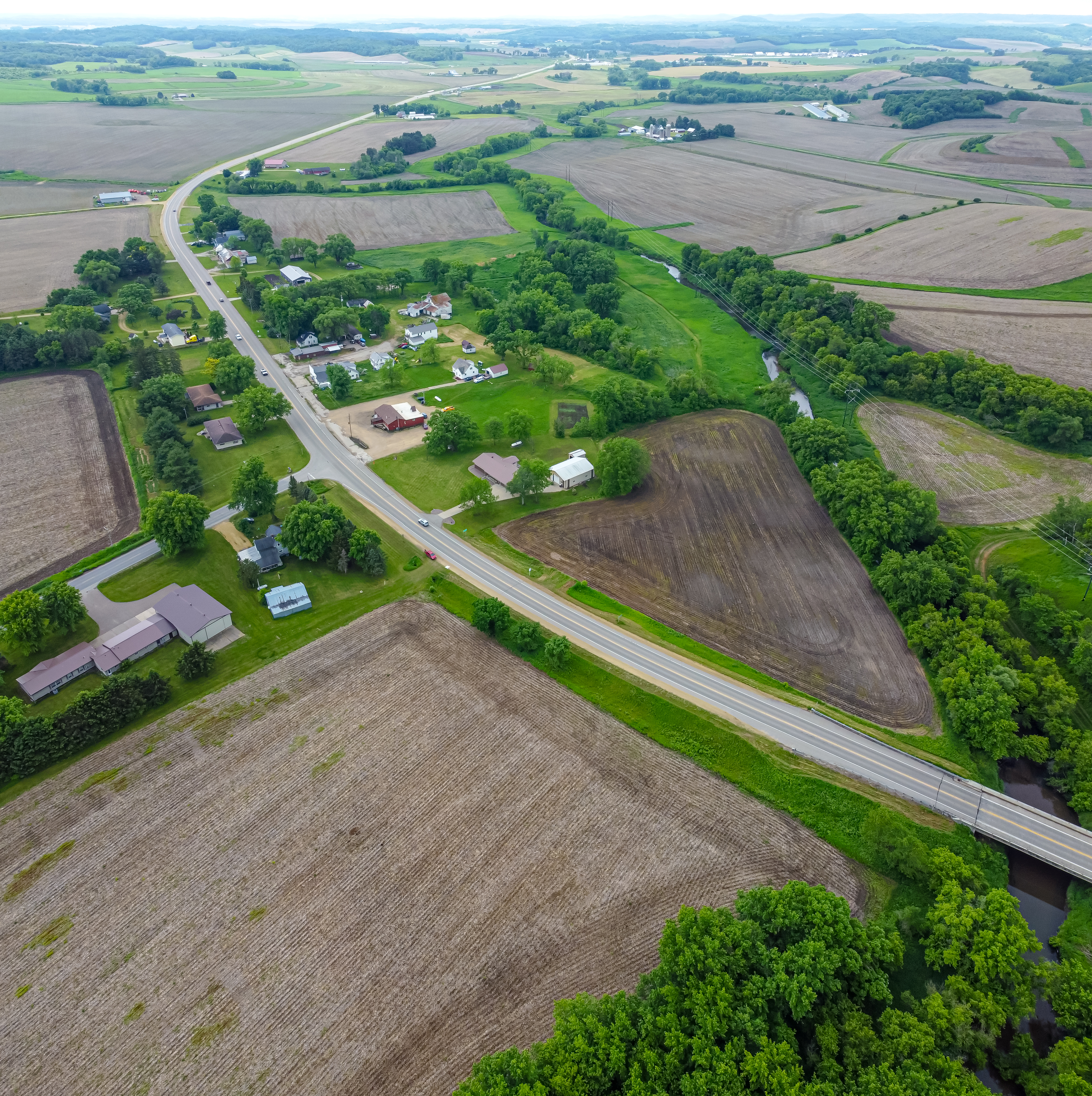
Elk Creek

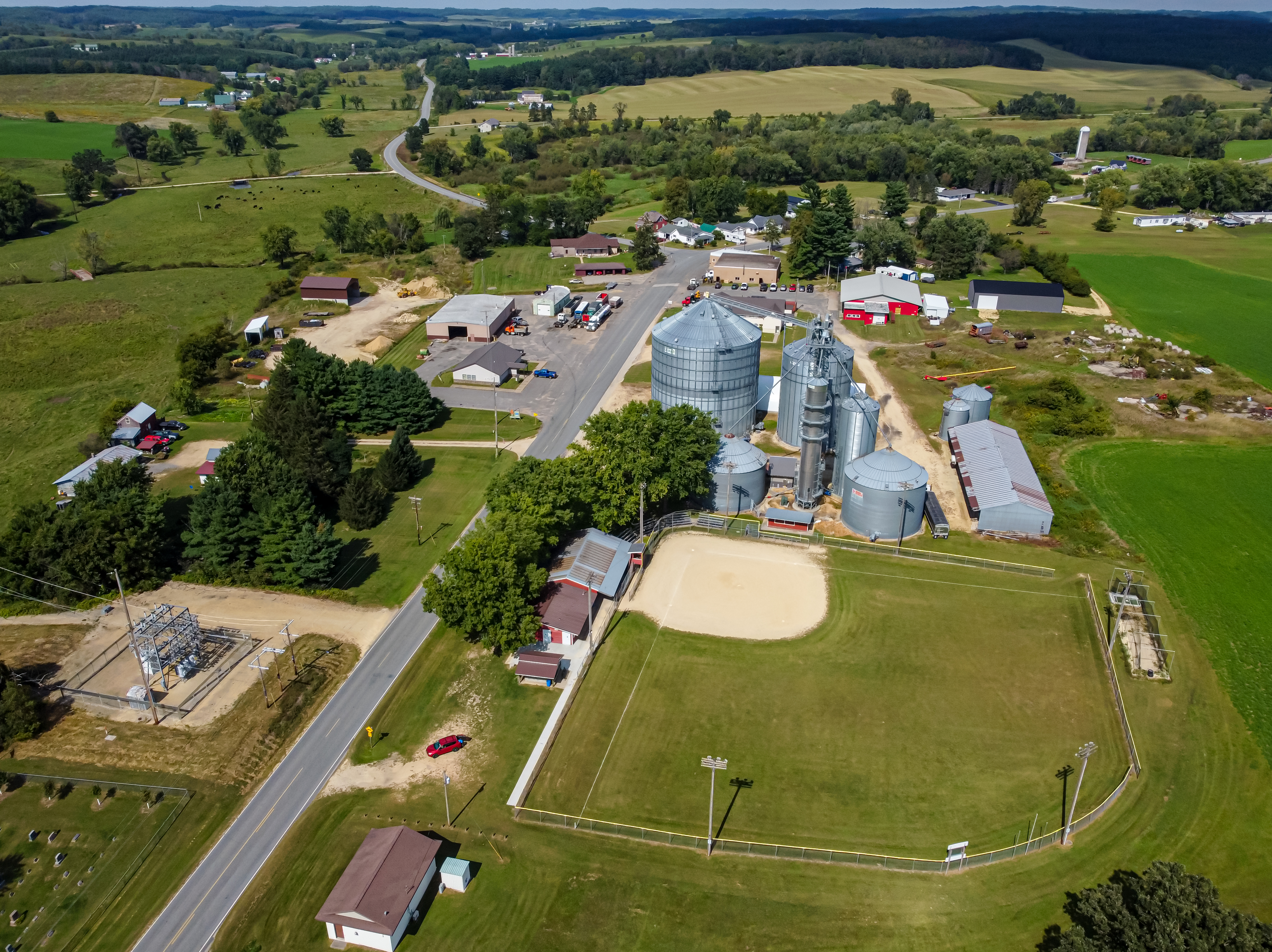
Hale

== Demographics ==
As of the census of 2000, there were 988 people, 354 households, and 288 families residing in the town. The population density was 14.2 people per square mile (5.5/km^{2}). There were 380 housing units at an average density of 5.5 per square mile (2.1/km^{2}). The racial makeup of the town was 98.28% White, 0.10% African American, 0.61% Native American, 0.20% Asian, 0.20% from other races, and 0.61% from two or more races. Hispanic or Latino of any race were 0.81% of the population.

There were 354 households, out of which 37.6% had children under the age of 18 living with them, 69.2% were married couples living together, 4.2% had a female householder with no husband present, and 18.6% were non-families. 14.1% of all households were made up of individuals, and 5.9% had someone living alone who was 65 years of age or older. The average household size was 2.79 and the average family size was 3.04.

In the town, the population was 28.0% under the age of 18, 5.9% from 18 to 24, 29.8% from 25 to 44, 25.3% from 45 to 64, and 11.0% who were 65 years of age or older. The median age was 37 years. For every 100 females, there were 108.4 males. For every 100 females age 18 and over, there were 113.5 males.

The median income for a household in the town was $42,589, and the median income for a family was $44,375. Males had a median income of $27,500 versus $19,919 for females. The per capita income for the town was $17,262. About 5.8% of families and 5.5% of the population were below the poverty line, including 4.1% of those under age 18 and 15.9% of those age 65 or over.
