= Lafayette, Walworth County, Wisconsin =

Lafayette, Wisconsin
- Town
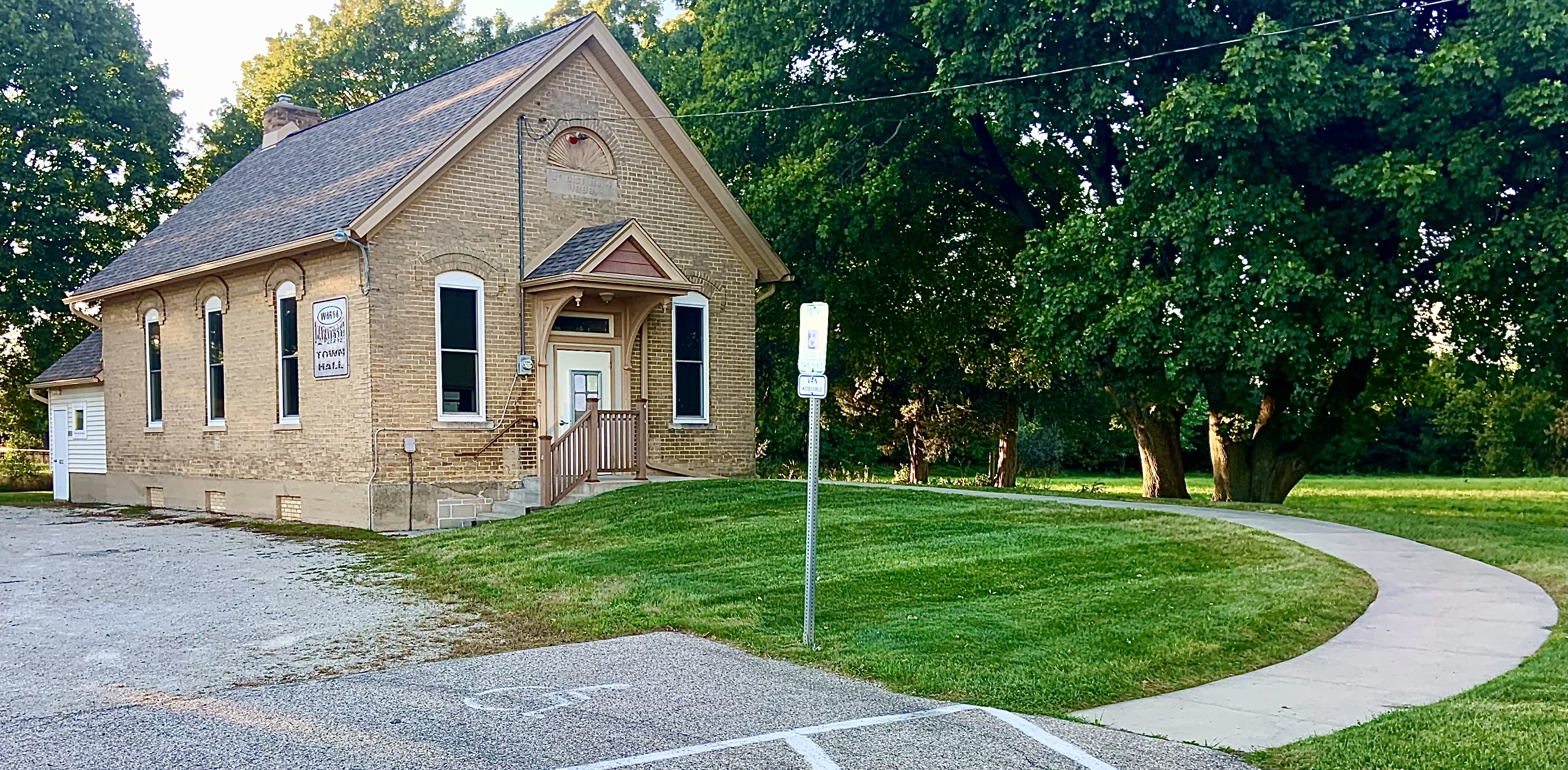
- Town hall

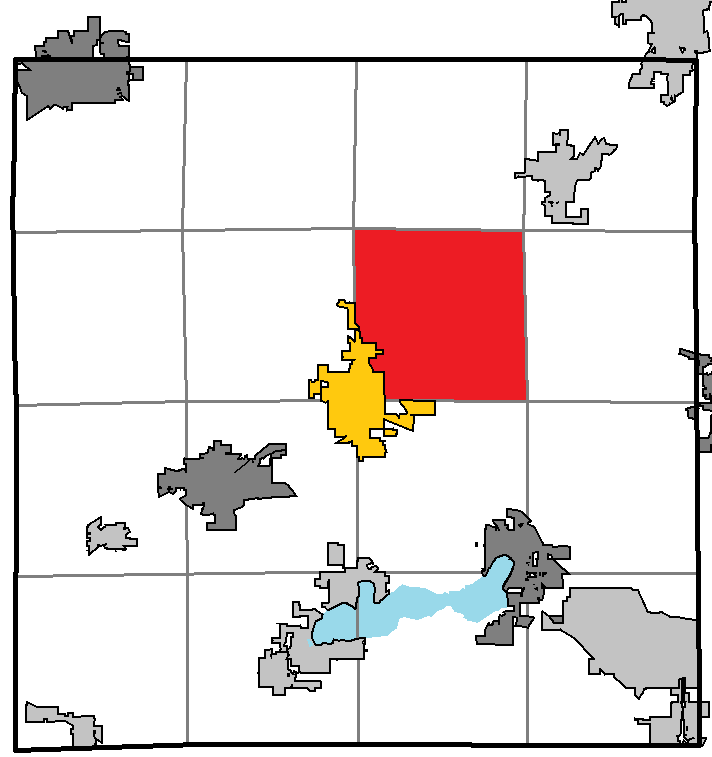
- Location of Lafayette, within Walworth County

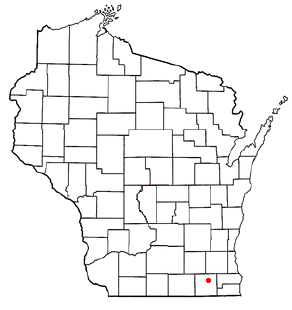
- Location of Lafayette, Wisconsin
- Coordinates: 42°43′6″N 88°28′37″W
- Country: United States
- State: Wisconsin
- County: Walworth

Area
  - Total: 34.5 sq mi (89.4 km^{2})
  - Land: 34.5 sq mi (89.4 km^{2})
  - Water: 0.039 sq mi (0.1 km^{2})
- Elevation: 906 ft (276 m)

Population (2020)
  - Total: 2,039
  - Density: 59.1/sq mi (22.8/km^{2})
- Time zone: UTC-6 (Central (CST))
  - Summer (DST): UTC-5 (CDT)
- Area code: 262
- FIPS code: 55-40950
- GNIS feature ID: 1583504
- Website: https://lafayettewcwi.gov/

Lafayette is a town in Walworth County, Wisconsin, United States. The population was 2,039 at the 2020 census. The unincorporated community of Bowers is located in the town. The unincorporated community of Abells Corners is also located partially in the town.

== Geography ==
According to the United States Census Bureau, the town has a total area of 34.5 square miles (89.4 km^{2}), of which 34.5 square miles (89.4 km^{2}) is land and 0.04 square mile (0.1 km^{2}) (0.06%) is water.

== Demographics ==
As of the census of 2000, there were 2,251 people, 595 households, and 496 families residing in the town. The population density was 65.2 people per square mile (25.2/km^{2}). There were 619 housing units at an average density of 17.9 per square mile (6.9/km^{2}). The racial makeup of the town was 96.4% White, 1.02% African American, 0.58% Native American, 0.98% Asian, 0.49% from other races, and 0.53% from two or more races. Hispanic or Latino people of any race were 2.67% of the population.

There were 595 households, out of which 38.3% had children under the age of 18 living with them, 76% were married couples living together, 3.7% had a female householder with no husband present, and 16.6% were non-families. 12.3% of all households were made up of individuals, and 5% had someone living alone who was 65 years of age or older. The average household size was 2.87 and the average family size was 3.13.

In the town, the population was spread out, with 21.8% under the age of 18, 8.7% from 18 to 24, 28.1% from 25 to 44, 22.4% from 45 to 64, and 19% who were 65 years of age or older. The median age was 41 years. For every 100 females, there were 115 males. For every 100 females age 18 and over, there were 118.6 males.

The median income for a household in the town was $62,500, and the median income for a family was $66,786. Males had a median income of $37,857 versus $23,750 for females. The per capita income for the town was $23,132. About 4% of families and 5.6% of the population were below the poverty line, including 8.1% of those under age 18 and 2% of those age 65 or over.
