= Chittamo, Wisconsin =

- Unincorporated community
- Location within Wisconsin Location within the United States
- Coordinates: 46°07′41″N 91°43′00″W
- Country: United States
- State: Wisconsin
- County: Washburn
- Elevation: 1,102 ft (336 m)
- Time zone: UTC-6 (Central (CST))
  - Summer (DST): UTC-5 (CDT)
- Area codes: 715 and 534
- GNIS feature ID: 1577546

Chittamo (/tʃɪtəˈmoʊ/ chit-ə-MOH) is an unincorporated community located in the town of Frog Creek, Washburn County, Wisconsin, United States.

== History ==
It is named for the Ojibwe word for "squirrel," which was also the name of an important Ojibwe leader who lived in the area.
