= Little Suamico, Wisconsin =

- Town
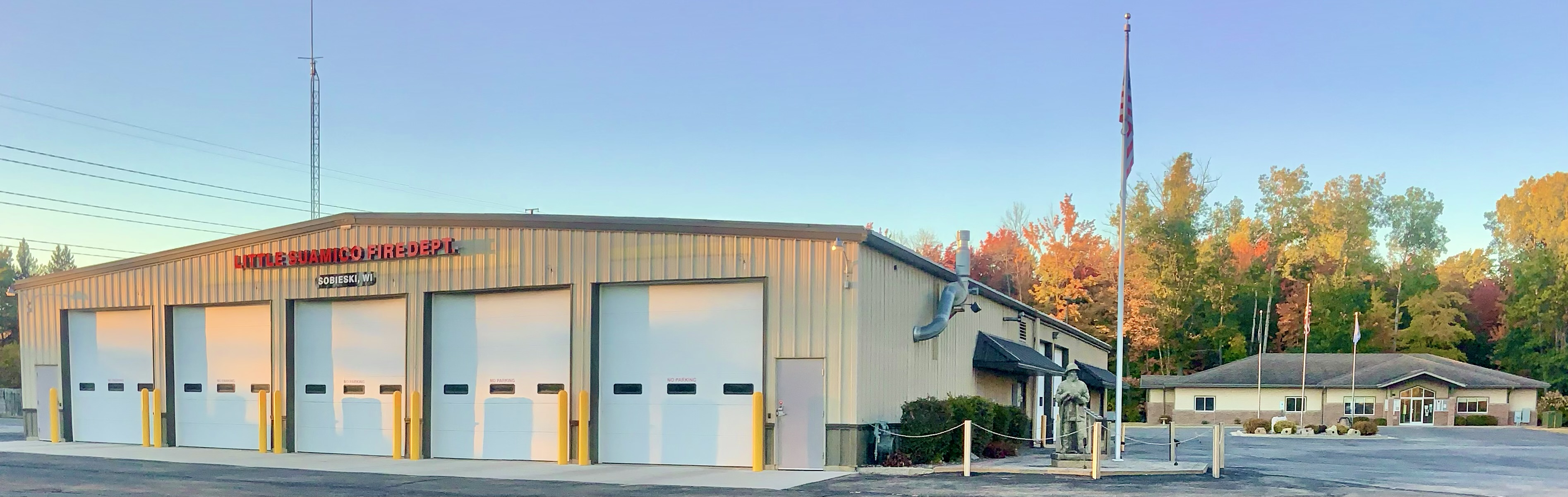
- Town hall and fire department

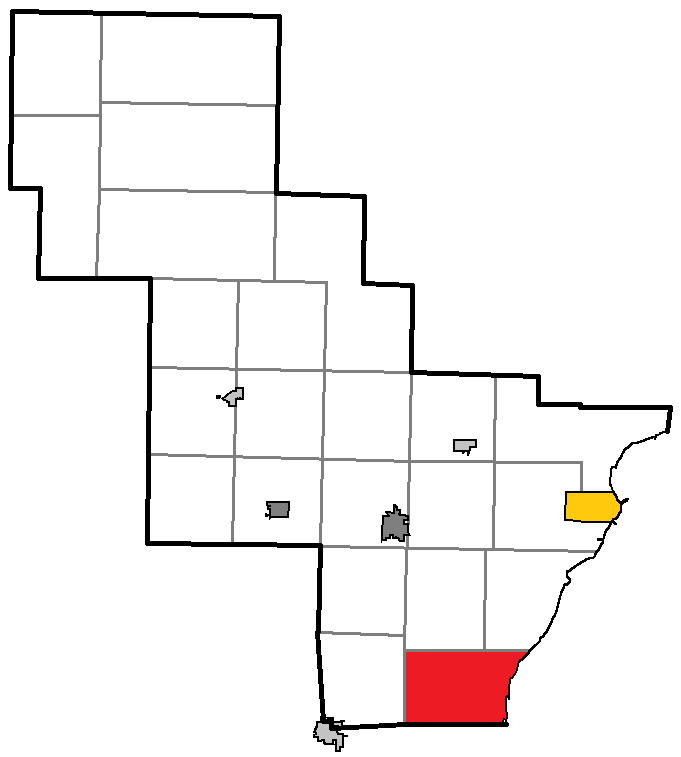
- Location of Little Suamico, within Oconto County
- Coordinates: 44°42′55″N 88°2′45″W
- Country: United States
- State: Wisconsin
- County: Oconto

Area
  - Total: 37.4 sq mi (96.9 km^{2})
  - Land: 37.3 sq mi (96.7 km^{2})
  - Water: 0.077 sq mi (0.2 km^{2})
- Elevation: 633 ft (193 m)

Population (2020)
  - Total: 5,536
  - Density: 148/sq mi (57.2/km^{2})
- Time zone: UTC-6 (Central (CST))
  - Summer (DST): UTC-5 (CDT)
- Area code: 920
- FIPS code: 55-45275
- GNIS feature ID: 1583586
- Website: http://www.townoflittlesuamico.com

Little Suamico is a town in Oconto County, Wisconsin, United States. The population was 5,536 at the 2020 census.

== Communities ==
- Little Suamico is an unincorporated community located along County Road J, south of the intersection with County Road S. The community has a post office with ZIP code 54141.
- Sobieski is an unincorporated community located along County Road S, west of US Highway 41.

== History ==
The earliest records for the town date to 1859, when Ernst Kuntze was the town chair, clerk, and treasurer.

The town established a post office in 1858, but it was discontinued in 1899. In 1901, the town reestablished a post office that still operates today.

== Geography ==
According to the United States Census Bureau, the town has a total area of 37.4 square miles (96.9 km^{2}), of which 37.3 square miles (96.7 km^{2}) is land and 0.1 square mile (0.2 km^{2}) (0.16%) is water.

== Demographics ==
The 2020 US Census lists the town's population at 5536. Up from 4799 in 2010.

As of the census of 2000, there were 3,877 people, 1,358 households, and 1,106 families residing in the town. The population density was 103.8 people per square mile (40.1/km^{2}). There were 1,403 housing units at an average density of 37.6 per square mile (14.5/km^{2}). The racial makeup of the town was 97.86% White, 0.59% African American, 0.54% Native American, 0.26% Asian, 0.03% Pacific Islander, 0.26% from other races, and 0.46% from two or more races. Hispanic or Latino of any race were 0.80% of the population.

There were 1,358 households, out of which 42.3% had children under the age of 18 living with them, 71.1% were married couples living together, 6.1% had a female householder with no husband present, and 18.5% were non-families. 13.6% of all households were made up of individuals, and 4.1% had someone living alone who was 65 years of age or older. The average household size was 2.85 and the average family size was 3.14.

In the town, the population was spread out, with 30.0% under the age of 18, 5.9% from 18 to 24, 35.3% from 25 to 44, 23.3% from 45 to 64, and 5.5% who were 65 years of age or older. The median age was 35 years. For every 100 females, there were 104.7 males. For every 100 females age 18 and over, there were 103.7 males.

The median income for a household in the town was $60,160, and the median income for a family was $64,973. Males had a median income of $39,846 versus $30,213 for females. The per capita income for the town was $22,520. About 2.1% of families and 3.9% of the population were below the poverty line, including 3.4% of those under age 18 and 8.7% of those age 65 or over.
