= Frankfort, Pepin County, Wisconsin =

Frankfort, Wisconsin
- Town
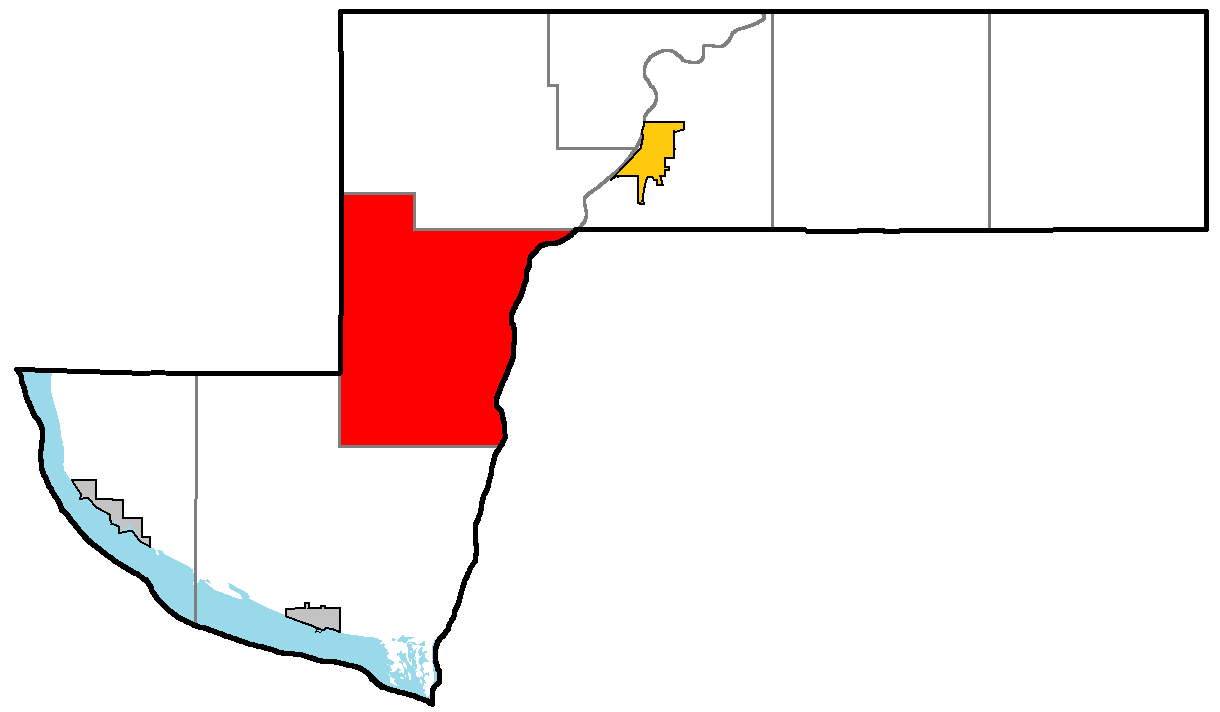
- Location of Frankfort, Pepin County, Wisconsin

- Location of Pepin County, Wisconsin
- Coordinates: 44°33′9″N 92°5′38″W
- Country: United States
- State: Wisconsin
- County: Pepin

Area
  - Total: 31.0 sq mi (80.2 km^{2})
  - Land: 30.1 sq mi (77.9 km^{2})
  - Water: 0.89 sq mi (2.3 km^{2})
- Elevation: 764 ft (233 m)

Population (2020)
  - Total: 325
  - Density: 10.8/sq mi (4.17/km^{2})
- Time zone: UTC-6 (Central (CST))
  - Summer (DST): UTC-5 (CDT)
- Area codes: 715 & 534
- FIPS code: 55-27175
- GNIS feature ID: 1583230
- Website: http://townoffrankfort.tripod.com

Frankfort (/ˈfræŋkfərt/ FRANK-fərt) is a town in Pepin County, Wisconsin, United States. The population was 325 at the 2020 census. The unincorporated communities of Ella, and Porcupine are located in the town.

== Geography ==
According to the United States Census Bureau, the town has a total area of 31.0 square miles (80.2 km^{2}), of which 30.1 square miles (77.9 km^{2}) is land and 0.9 square mile (2.3 km^{2}) (2.91%) is water.

== Demographics ==
As of the census of 2000, there were 362 people, 136 households, and 96 families residing in the town. The population density was 12.0 people per square mile (4.6/km^{2}). There were 161 housing units at an average density of 5.4 per square mile (2.1/km^{2}). The racial makeup of the town was 99.17% White, 0.28% from other races, and 0.55% from two or more races. Hispanic or Latino of any race were 0.28% of the population.

There were 136 households, out of which 30.9% had children under the age of 18 living with them, 58.8% were married couples living together, 6.6% had a female householder with no husband present, and 28.7% were non-families. 20.6% of all households were made up of individuals, and 5.1% had someone living alone who was 65 years of age or older. The average household size was 2.66 and the average family size was 3.12.

In the town, the population was spread out, with 22.7% under the age of 18, 9.7% from 18 to 24, 33.1% from 25 to 44, 22.7% from 45 to 64, and 11.9% who were 65 years of age or older. The median age was 38 years. For every 100 females, there were 120.7 males. For every 100 females age 18 and over, there were 118.8 males.

The median income for a household in the town was $32,813, and the median income for a family was $40,250. Males had a median income of $26,250 versus $23,000 for females. The per capita income for the town was $16,885. None of the families and 1.8% of the population were living below the poverty line, including no under eighteens and 7.5% of those over 64.

== Notable people ==
- Willis E. Donley, Wisconsin State Representative and lawyer, was born in the town
