= Norrie, Wisconsin =

Town of Norrie
- Town
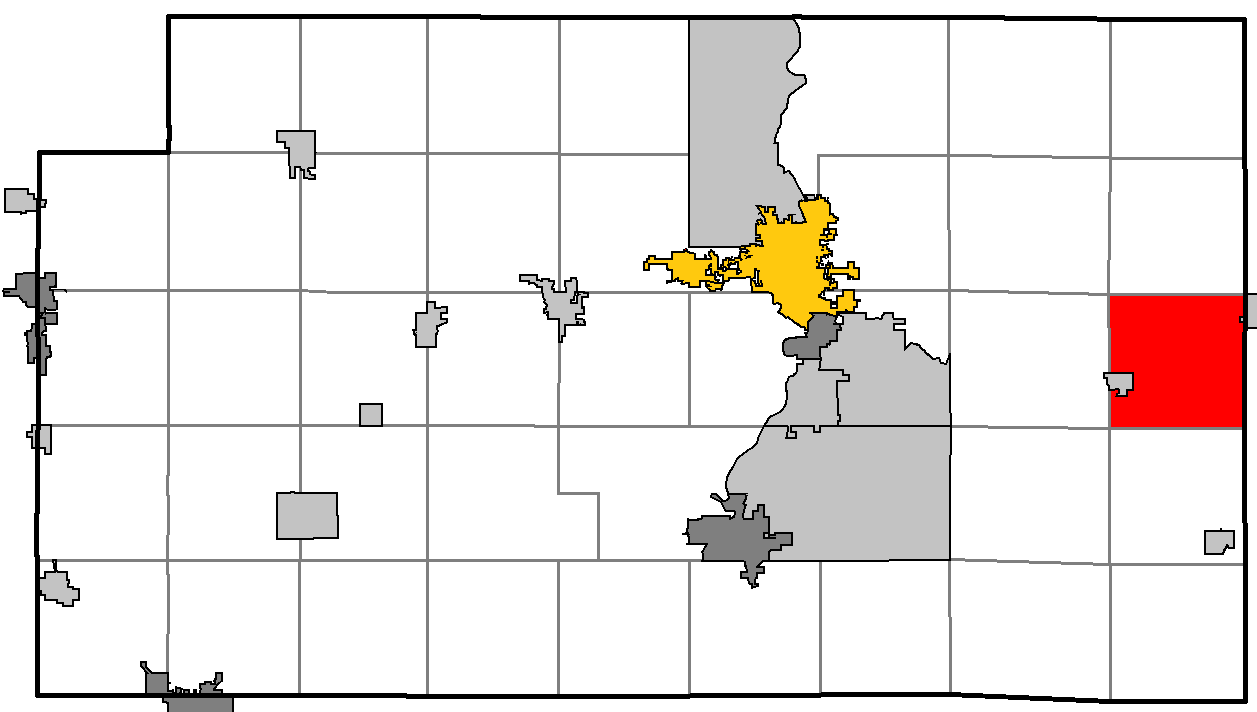
- Location of the Town of Norrie, Marathon County

- Location of Marathon County, Wisconsin
- Coordinates: 44°53′32″N 89°17′4″W
- Country: United States
- State: Wisconsin
- County: Marathon

Area
  - Total: 35.1 sq mi (91.0 km^{2})
  - Land: 34.5 sq mi (89.4 km^{2})
  - Water: 0.62 sq mi (1.6 km^{2})
- Elevation: 1,296 ft (395 m)

Population (2020)
  - Total: 1,010
  - Density: 29.3/sq mi (11.3/km^{2})
- Time zone: UTC-6 (Central (CST))
  - Summer (DST): UTC-5 (CDT)
- Area codes: 715 & 534
- FIPS code: 55-57600
- GNIS feature ID: 1583823
- Website: https://townofnorrie.org/

The Town of Norrie is located in Marathon County, Wisconsin, United States. It is part of the Wausau, Wisconsin Metropolitan Statistical Area. The population was 1,010 at the 2020 census.

== Geography ==
According to the United States Census Bureau, the town has a total area of 35.1 square miles (91.0 km^{2}), of which 34.5 square miles (89.4 km^{2}) is land and 0.62 square miles (1.6 km^{2}), or 1.79%, is water.

== Demographics ==
At the 2000 census there were 967 people, 342 households, and 272 families living in the town. The population density was 27.9 people per square mile (10.8/km^{2}). There were 385 housing units at an average density of 11.1 per square mile (4.3/km^{2}). The racial makeup of the town was 98.97% White, 0.41% African American, 0.41% Native American, 0.10% Asian, 0.10% from other races. Hispanic or Latino of any race were 0.52%.

Of the 342 households 38.0% had children under the age of 18 living with them, 69.9% were married couples living together, 4.1% had a female householder with no husband present, and 20.2% were non-families. 16.7% of households were one person and 8.5% were one person aged 65 or older. The average household size was 2.82 and the average family size was 3.14.

The age distribution was 29.0% under the age of 18, 7.4% from 18 to 24, 29.3% from 25 to 44, 22.9% from 45 to 64, and 11.5% 65 or older. The median age was 36 years. For every 100 females, there were 113.0 males. For every 100 females age 18 and over, there were 108.8 males.

The median household income was $48,472 and the median family income was $55,227. Males had a median income of $32,917 versus $25,083 for females. The per capita income for the town was $21,330. About 3.6% of families and 3.9% of the population were below the poverty line, including 3.7% of those under age 18 and 5.8% of those age 65 or over.
