= Lima, Grant County, Wisconsin =

Lima, Wisconsin
- Town
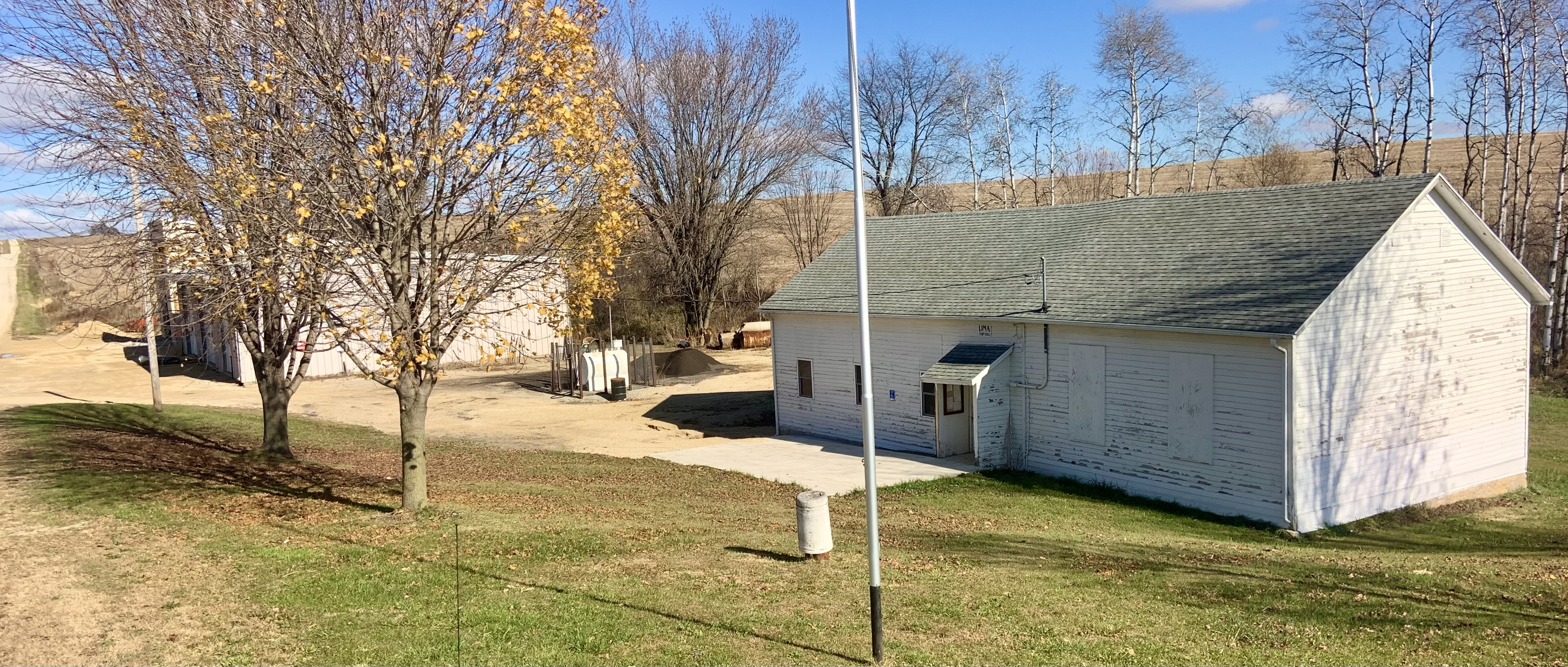
- Town hall

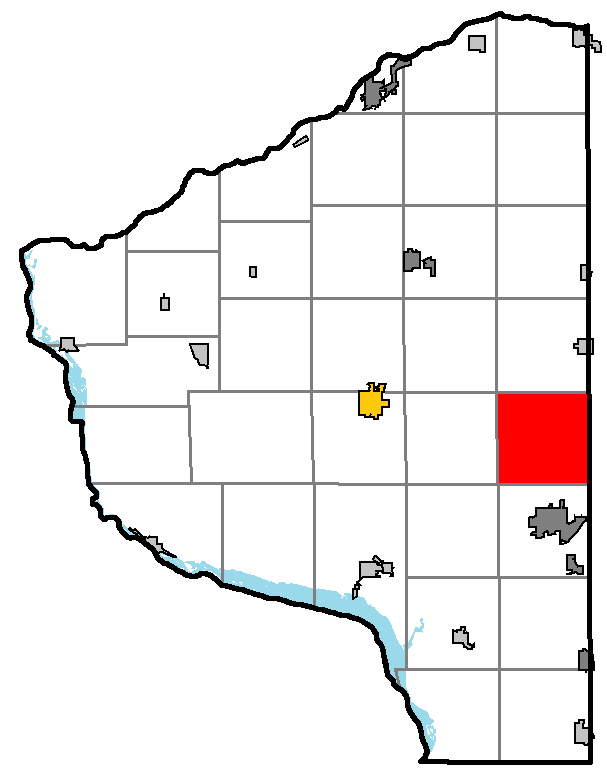
- Location of Lima in Grant County, Wisconsin

- Location of Grant County in Wisconsin
- Coordinates: 42°49′23″N 90°29′3″W
- Country: United States
- State: Wisconsin
- County: Grant

Area
  - Total: 36.6 sq mi (94.7 km^{2})
  - Land: 36.6 sq mi (94.7 km^{2})
  - Water: 0 sq mi (0.0 km^{2})
- Elevation: 988 ft (301 m)

Population (2020)
  - Total: 771
  - Density: 21.1/sq mi (8.14/km^{2})
- Time zone: UTC-6 (Central (CST))
  - Summer (DST): UTC-5 (CDT)
- Area code: 608
- FIPS code: 55-44050
- GNIS feature ID: 1583555

Lima is a town in Grant County, Wisconsin, United States. The population was 771 at the 2020 census. The unincorporated communities of Arthur and Union are located in the town.

== Geography ==
According to the United States Census Bureau, the town has a total area of 36.6 square miles (94.7 km^{2}), of which 36.5 square miles (94.7 km^{2}) is land and 0.03% is water.

Most of Lima is farmland. Looking north toward the hamlet of Arthur

== Demographics ==
As of the census of 2000, there were 721 people, 237 households, and 191 families living in the town. The population density was 19.7 people per square mile (7.6/km^{2}). There were 251 housing units at an average density of 6.9 per square mile (2.7/km^{2}). The racial makeup of the town was 98.61% White, 0.28% African American, 0.14% Native American and 0.97% Asian. Hispanic or Latino of any race were 0.42% of the population.

There were 237 households, out of which 39.7% had children under the age of 18 living with them, 72.6% were married couples living together, 4.6% had a female householder with no husband present, and 19.4% were non-families. 13.9% of all households were made up of individuals, and 3.8% had someone living alone who was 65 years of age or older. The average household size was 3.04 and the average family size was 3.39.

In the town, the population was spread out, with 31.8% under the age of 18, 8.5% from 18 to 24, 28.6% from 25 to 44, 22.6% from 45 to 64, and 8.6% who were 65 years of age or older. The median age was 33 years. For every 100 females, there were 106.0 males. For every 100 females age 18 and over, there were 104.1 males.

The median income for a household in the town was $39,464, and the median income for a family was $40,179. Males had a median income of $25,313 versus $23,077 for females. The per capita income for the town was $15,187. About 7.6% of families and 13.6% of the population were below the poverty line, including 21.4% of those under age 18 and 7.1% of those age 65 or over.
