= Frostville, Wisconsin =

- Unincorporated community
- Location within Wisconsin Location within the United States
- Coordinates: 45°00′19″N 88°19′30″W
- Country: United States
- State: Wisconsin
- County: Oconto
- Elevation: 873 ft (266 m)
- Time zone: UTC-6 (Central (CST))
  - Summer (DST): UTC-5 (CDT)
- Area code: 920
- GNIS feature ID: 1579299

Frostville is an unincorporated community located in the town of Maple Valley, Oconto County, Wisconsin, United States. The community was named for Andrew C. Frost, who established a general store in the community in 1880.
