= Liberty Pole, Wisconsin =

- Unincorporated community
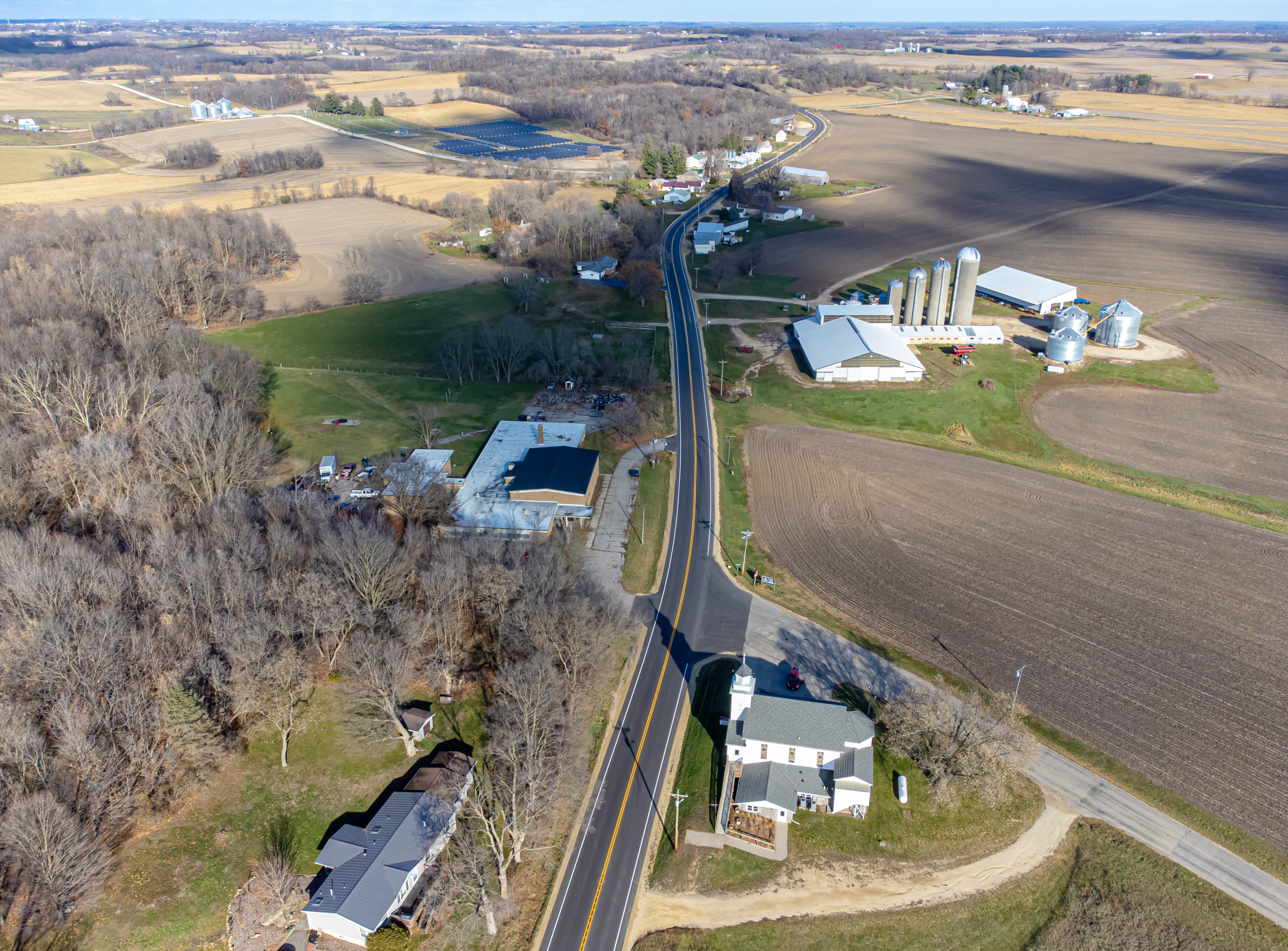

- Location within Wisconsin Location within the United States
- Coordinates: 43°29′24″N 90°54′31″W
- Country: United States
- State: Wisconsin
- County: Vernon
- Elevation: 1,201 ft (366 m)
- Time zone: UTC-6 (Central (CST))
  - Summer (DST): UTC-5 (CDT)
- Area code: 608
- GNIS feature ID: 1568017

Liberty Pole is an unincorporated community in Vernon County, Wisconsin, United States, located in the town of Franklin.

== Notable people ==
- T. Frank Clancy, businessman and politician, was born in Liberty Pole.
