= Sarona (community), Wisconsin =

Sarona, Wisconsin
- Unincorporated community
- Location within Wisconsin Location within the United States
- Coordinates: 45°42′40″N 91°48′24″W
- Country: United States
- State: Wisconsin
- County: Washburn
- Elevation: 1,299 ft (396 m)
- Time zone: UTC-6 (Central (CST))
  - Summer (DST): UTC-5 (CDT)
- ZIP code: 54870
- Area codes: 715 & 534
- GNIS feature ID: 1573728

Sarona is an unincorporated community located in the town of Sarona, Washburn County, Wisconsin, United States. Sarona is located on U.S. Route 53, 6 miles (9.7 km) east-southeast of Shell Lake. Sarona has a post office with ZIP code 54870.

== History ==
Sarona was founded in 1898. It was named by combining the last name of Fran Sauer (the first settler in 1898) with the Sharon plain, which the lush grass of the area suggested to the Mennonites who came the next year. A post office has been in operation in Sarona since 1899.
