= Hull, Marathon County, Wisconsin =

Town of Hull
- Town
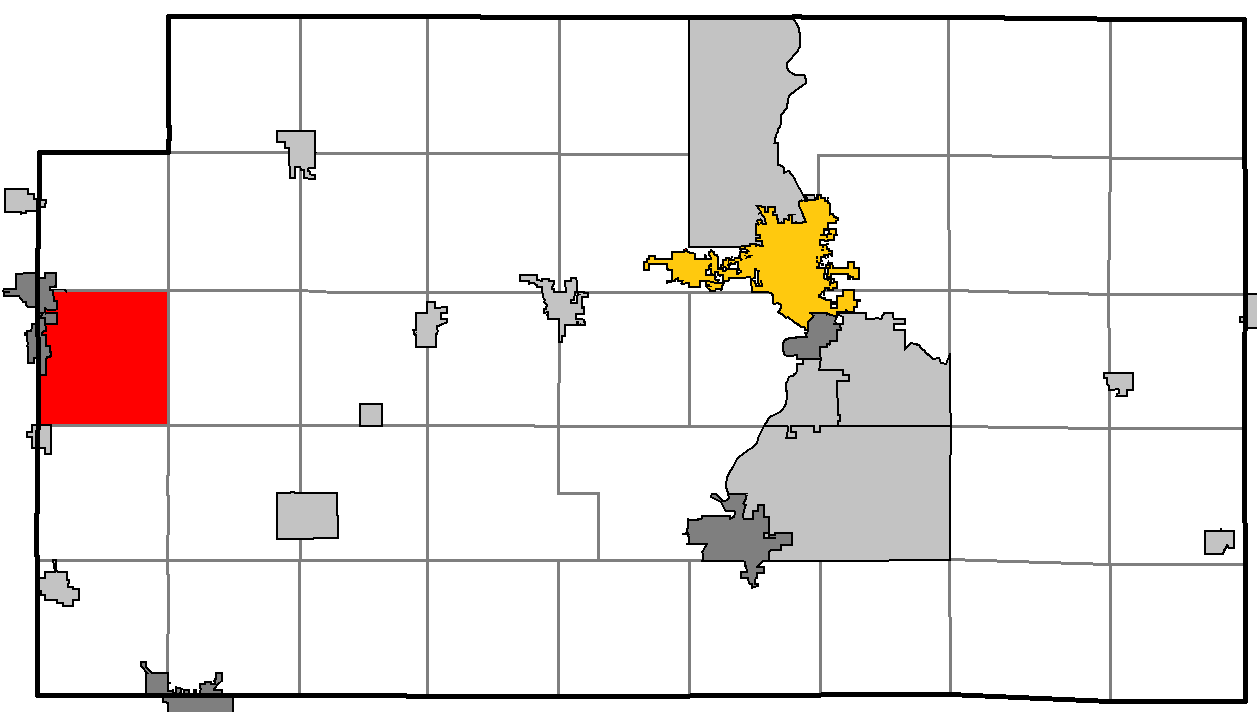
- Location of the Town of Hull, Marathon County

- Location of Marathon County, Wisconsin
- Coordinates: 44°53′42″N 90°14′53″W
- Country: United States
- State: Wisconsin
- County: Marathon

Area
  - Total: 32.6 sq mi (84.5 km^{2})
  - Land: 32.5 sq mi (84.3 km^{2})
  - Water: 0.077 sq mi (0.2 km^{2})
- Elevation: 1,375 ft (419 m)

Population (2020)
  - Total: 756
  - Density: 23.2/sq mi (8.97/km^{2})
- Time zone: UTC-6 (Central (CST))
  - Summer (DST): UTC-5 (CDT)
- Area codes: 715 & 534
- FIPS code: 55-36325
- GNIS feature ID: 1583420

The Town of Hull is located in Marathon County, Wisconsin, United States. It is part of the Wausau, Wisconsin, Metropolitan Statistical Area. The population was 756 at the 2020 census. The unincorporated community of Cherokee is located in the town.

== History ==
The town of Hull was named for David B. Hull, who was one of the original settlers in the area.

== Geography ==
According to the United States Census Bureau, the town has a total area of 32.6 square miles (84.5 km^{2}), of which 32.6 square miles (84.3 km^{2}) is land and 0.1 square miles (0.2 km^{2}), or 0.21%, is water.

== Demographics ==
At the 2020 census there were 756 people, 286 households, and 225 families living in the town. The population density was 23 inhabitants per square mile (8.9/km^{2}). There were 270 housing units at an average density of 8.3 per square mile (3.2/km^{2}). The racial makeup of the town was 95.4% White, 1.7% from other races, and 2.9% from two or more races. Hispanic or Latino of any race were 2.4%. (Note: The Decennial Census indicates and ACS Estimates indicate different values, but are both available on the Census site. The above is Decennial Census data)

Of the 286 households 40.2% had children under the age of 18 living with them, 65.4% were married couples living together, 2.5% had a female householder with no husband present, and 21.3% were non-families. 17.1% of households were one person of which 9.1% were aged 65 or older. The average household size was 2.99. (Note: These numbers are based on ACS Estimates)

The age distribution was 28.7% under the age of 18, 13.4% from 18 to 24, and 12.8% 65 or older. The median age was 33.8 years. For every 100 females, there were 111.0 males.
