= Wisconsin Highway 173 =

State highway in Wisconsin, United States

State Trunk Highway 173
- WIS 173 highlighted in red

Route information
- Maintained by WisDOT
- Length: 36.85 mi (59.30 km)

Major junctions
- South end: WIS 21 west of Wyeville
- WIS 80 southwest of Babcock; WIS 80 in Babcock
- North end: WIS 73 in Nekoosa

Location
- Country: United States
- State: Wisconsin
- Counties: Monroe, Juneau, Wood

Highway system
- Wisconsin State Trunk Highway System; Interstate; US; State; Scenic; Rustic
← WIS 172	→ WIS 174

State Trunk Highway 173 (often called Highway 173, STH-173 or WIS 173) is a 36.85-mile (59.30 km) state highway in Monroe, Juneau, and Wood counties in the central region of the US state of Wisconsin that runs north–south from near Wyeville to Nekoosa. From Valley Junction to Babcock it is built on top of an abandoned former main line of the Wisconsin Valley Railroad (later the Milwaukee Road). Because of this, the highway along this section is very straight.

== Route description ==
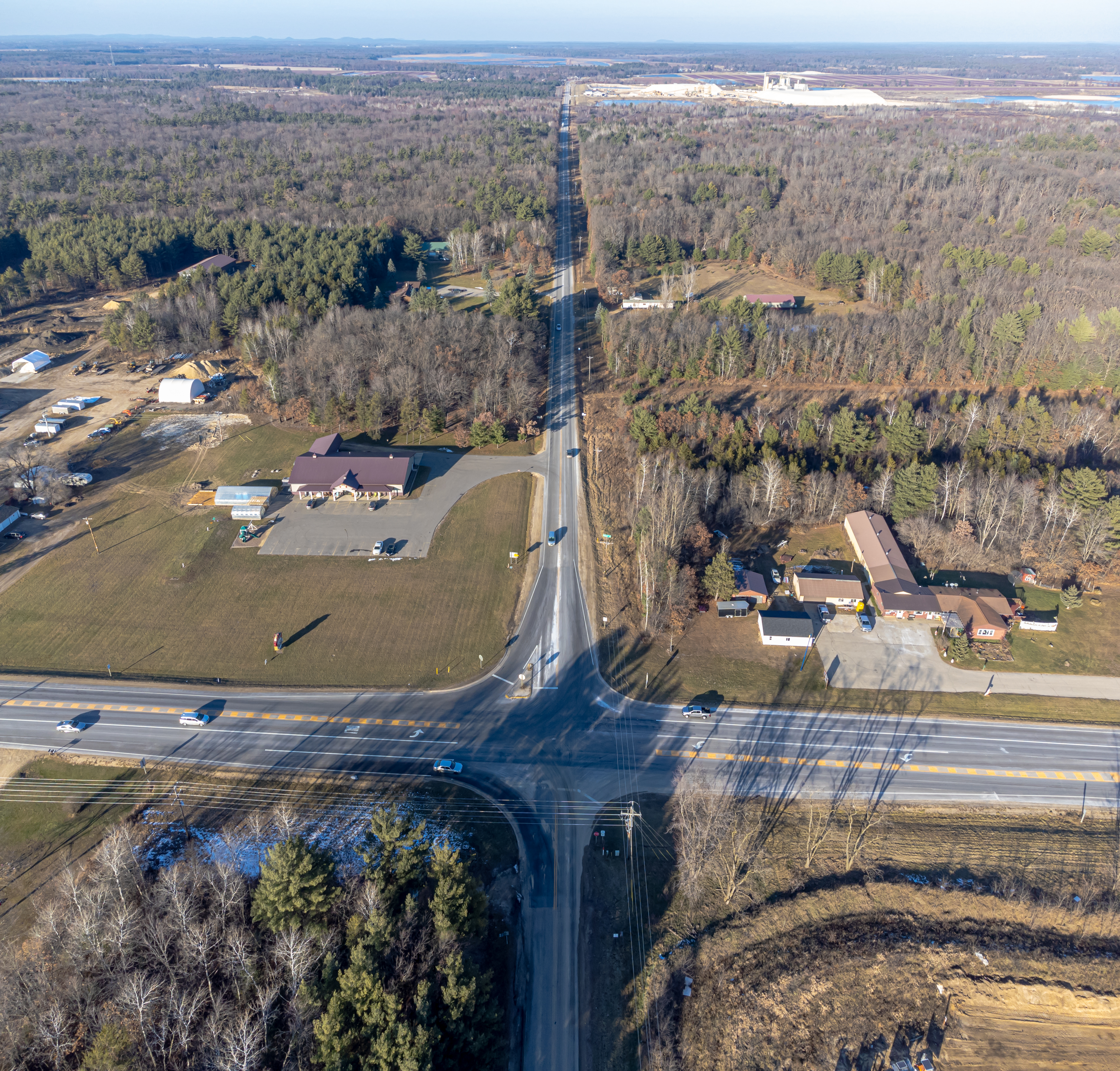
WIS 173 southern terminus, junction with WIS 21, looking north

WIS 173 begins at a junction with WIS 21 in the Town of Byron, about 0.7 miles (1.1 km) west of the village of Wyeville in northeastern Monroe County. For its entire length, WIS 173 is a two-lane road that travels mostly through wetlands of central Wisconsin.

From its southern terminus, WIS 173 runs concurrently northward with County Trunk Highway N (CTH-N) for about 1.6 miles (2.6 km) to the northern end of its concurrency with CTH-N, as well as a junction with the eastern end of CTH-G at a T intersection in the unincorporated community of Valley Junction. In Valley Junction, WIS 173 turns northeast and continues along that straight heading for just under 22 miles (35 km), until it almost reaches census-designated place of Babcock. Approximately 1.6 miles (2.6 km) along this northeastern heading, WIS 173 leaves the Town of Bryon and enters the Town of Scott.

Upon enter entering the Town of Scott, WIS 173 also enters the Meadow Valley Wildlife Area. Continuing northeast for about 4.7 miles (7.6 km), and passing just northwest of the Monroe County Flowage reservoir, it reaches the unincorporated community of Norway Ridge. Just under a mile (1.6 km) northwest of that community is WIS 173's junction with the eastern end of CTH-EW at a T intersection. About a half-mile (0.8 km) past the CTH-EW junction WIS 173 leaves the Town of Scott and Monroe County to enter the Town of Kingston in Juneau County.

Nearly immediately after entering the Town of Kingston, WIS 173 passes through the unincorporated community of Mather, wherein it has two junctions with county trunk highways. The first junction is with the eastern end CTH-HH at the first intersection in the community. The junction with the western end of CTH-H is at the second (and only other) intersection in the community. Approximately 6.7 miles (10.8 km) northeast of Mater, WIS 173 passes through the unincorporated community of Meadow Valley, but does not have any major junctions within the community. About 2.4 miles (3.9 km) northwest of Meadow Valley, WIS 173 leaves the Town of Kingston to briefly pass through the northwest corner of the Town of Finley. Roughly 0.7 miles (1.1 km) further northeast, WIS 173 leaves the town of Finley and Juneau County to enter the Town of Remington in Wood County.

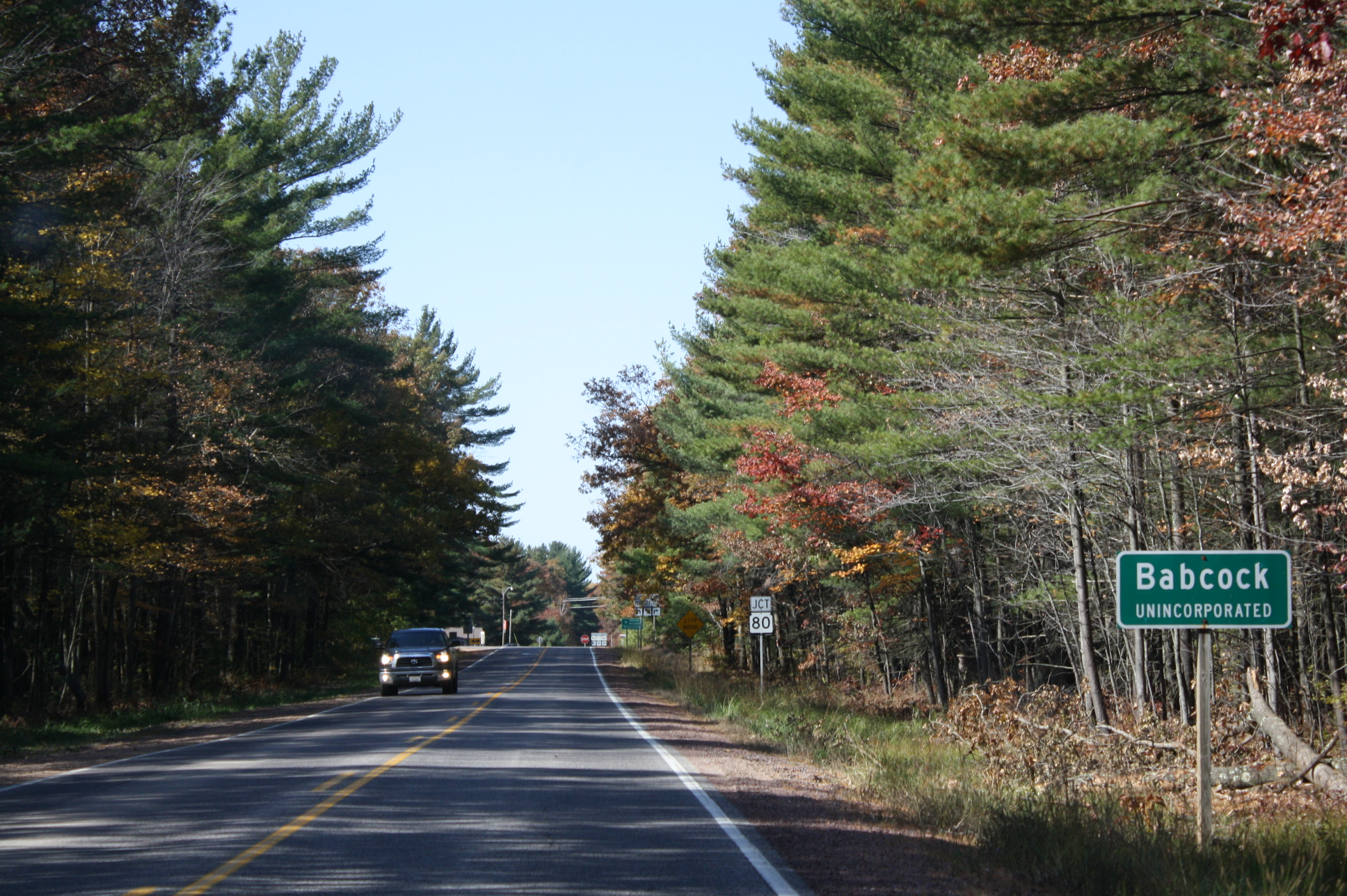
Looking west along WIS 173 in northern Babcock toward its junction with WIS 80, October 2010

About 4.2 miles (6.8 km) northeast into the Town of Remington, WIS 173 reaches its southern junction with WIS 80 at T intersection about a mile (1.6 km) southeast of the Babcock. North of the junction, which is also the northern end of the long and very straight section of the highway, WIS 173 and WIS 80 run concurrently northeasterly to arrive at their junction with the southern end of CTH-X at a T intersection. The WIS 173/WIS 80 promptly crosses over the Yellow River and then enters Babcock. After initially heading due east, the highway turn due north to travel five blocks to the north end of the community. On the north end of Babcock, WIS 173 and WIS 80 reach their northern junction at a T intersection.

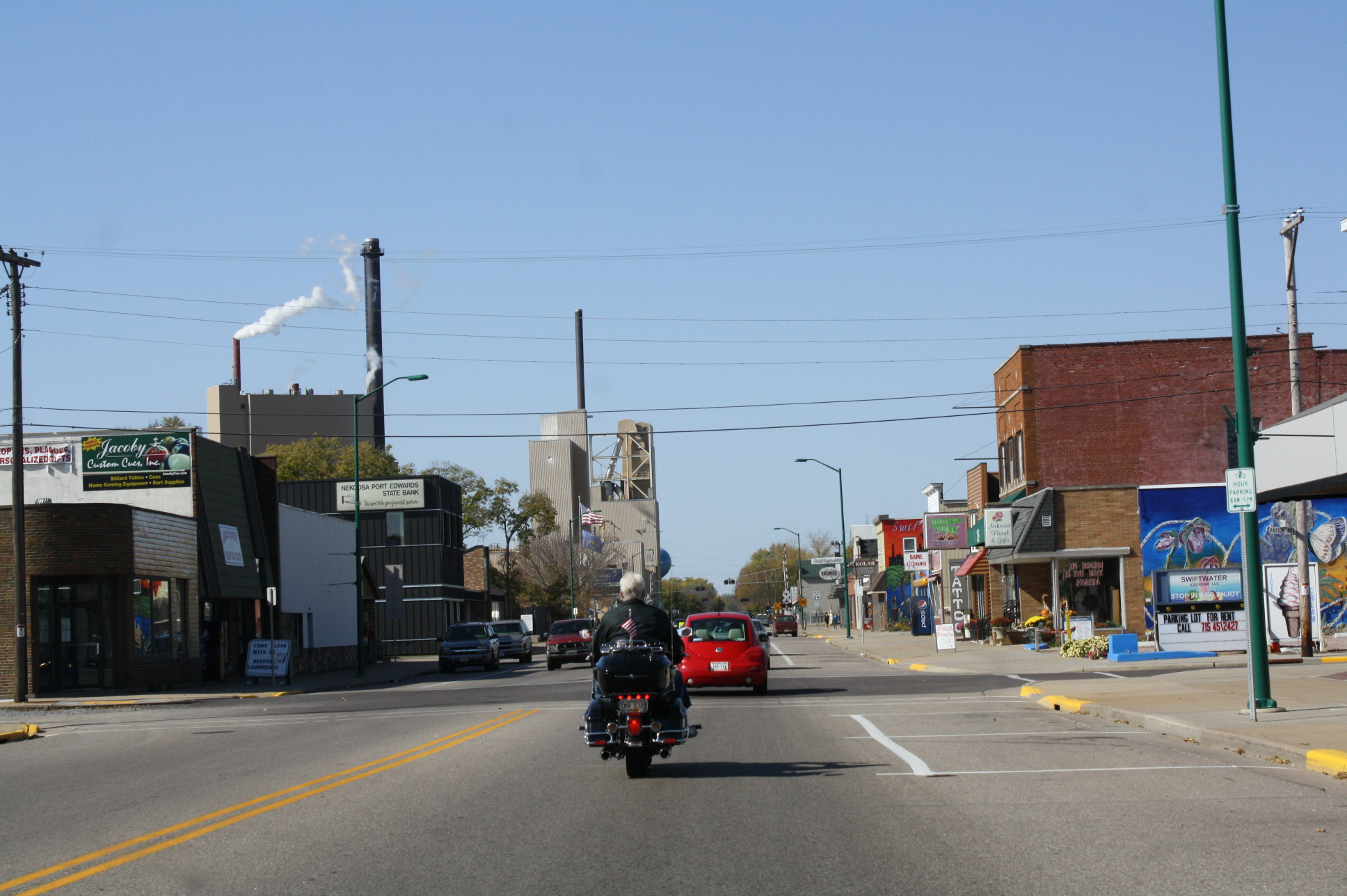
Looking west along WIS 173 from its eastern terminus in downtown Nekoosa, October 2010

Heading east and leaving Babcock, WIS 173 crosses over Hemlock Creek. About 1.3 miles (2.1 km) east of Babcock, WIS 173 begins a stretch of approximately 4.2 miles (6.8 km) that runs close to and parallel with a set of Canadian National Railway (CN) tracks. Promptly after beginning this stretch, WIS 173 leaves the Town of Remington and enters the Town of Port Edwards. Running along the north side of the CN tracks, WIS 173 heads east-northeast for about 2.1 miles (3.4 km) until it reaches its junction with the southern end of CTH-D at a T intersection on the western edge of the unincorporated community of Cranmoor. In central Cranmoor, WIS 173 jogs to the southeast for a level crossing over the CN tracks. After continuing east-northeast along the south side of the CN tracks for roughly 1.7 miles (2.7 km), WIS 173 turns to head east again. After about 1.8 miles (2.9 km), WIS 173 reaches its junction with CTH-GG, about 1.9-mile (3.1 km) west of Nekoosa. Approximately 1.8 miles (2.9 km) after its junction with CTH-GG, WIS 173 reaches its northern junction with CTH-G at a T intersection. Running concurrently southward with CTH-G for about a half-mile (0.8 km), WIS 173 reaches its southern junction with CTH-G at a T intersection on the western border of Nekoosa.

WIS 173 then turns east again to enter Nekoosa. After running east along Wood Avenue for about a mile (1.6 km), WIS 173 turns north to run along South Cedar Street for about two blocks before turning east again. After about another mile (1.6 km), heading east along Market Street, WIS 173 reaches its northern terminus at a junction with WIS 73 at a Y intersection on the western bank of the Wisconsin River, and the eastern border of Nekoosa.

== Major intersections ==
County	Location	mi	km	Destinations	Notes
Monroe	Town of Byron	0.0	0.0	WIS 21 – Wyeville, Necedah, Coloma, Tomah, Fort McCoy, Sparta CTH-N south – CTH-ET, US 12	Southern end of CTH-N concurrency; roadway continues as CTH-N
Monroe	Valley Junction	1.6	2.6	CTH-N north / CTH-G west – US 12, CTH-EW	Northern end of CTH-N concurrency
Monroe	Town of Scott	8.8	14.2	CTH-EW west – CTH-EE, CTH-N, Warrens, I-94, US 12	
Juneau	Mather	9.7	15.6	CTH-EE west / – CTH-HH, CTH-EW	
Juneau	Mather	9.8	15.8	CTH-H south – US 12	
Wood	Town of Remington	23.6	38.0	WIS 80 south – Necedah	Southern end of WIS 80 concurrency
Wood	Town of Remington	23.9	38.5	CTH-X north – WIS 54	
Wood	Babcock	25.0	40.2	WIS 80 north – Pittsville	Northern end of WIS 80 concurrency
Wood	Community of Cranmoor	28.5	45.9	CTH-D north – WIS 54, WIS 73	
Wood	Town of Cranmoor	32.4	52.1	CTH-GG – WIS 54, CTH-G	
Wood	Town of Port Edwards	34.0	54.7	CTH-G north – WIS 54	Northern end of CTH-G concurrency
Wood	Town of Port Edwards	34.6	55.7	CTH-G south – CTH-JJ, CTH-GG, CTH-AA, New Miner, Necedah	Southern end of CTH-G concurrency
Wood	Nekoosa	36.4	58.6	CTH-AA south (Point Basse Avenue) – CTH-JJ, CTH-G	
Wood	Nekoosa	36.8	59.2	WIS 73 – Port Edwards, Wisconsin Rapids, Plainfield, Wautoma	Y intersection on west bank of Wisconsin River
1.000 mi = 1.609 km; 1.000 km = 0.621 mi: Concurrency terminus
