= Meadow Valley =

Meadow Valley may refer to:

== Places ==
United States

- Meadow Valley (Arizona), a valley in Santa Cruz County, Arizona
- Meadow Valley (basin), a basin between the California/Nevada state line and Peavine Mountain
- Meadow Valley, Idaho
- Meadow Valley (Nevada), the location of Meadow Valley Wash
- Meadow Valley, California, a census-designated place
- Meadow Valley, Utah, a populated place in Salt Lake County, Utah
- Meadow Valley, Wisconsin, an unincorporated community in Juneau County, Wisconsin
- Meadow Valley Park, Illinois, a recreation area in Tazewell County, Illinois
