= Mather, Wisconsin =

- Unincorporated community
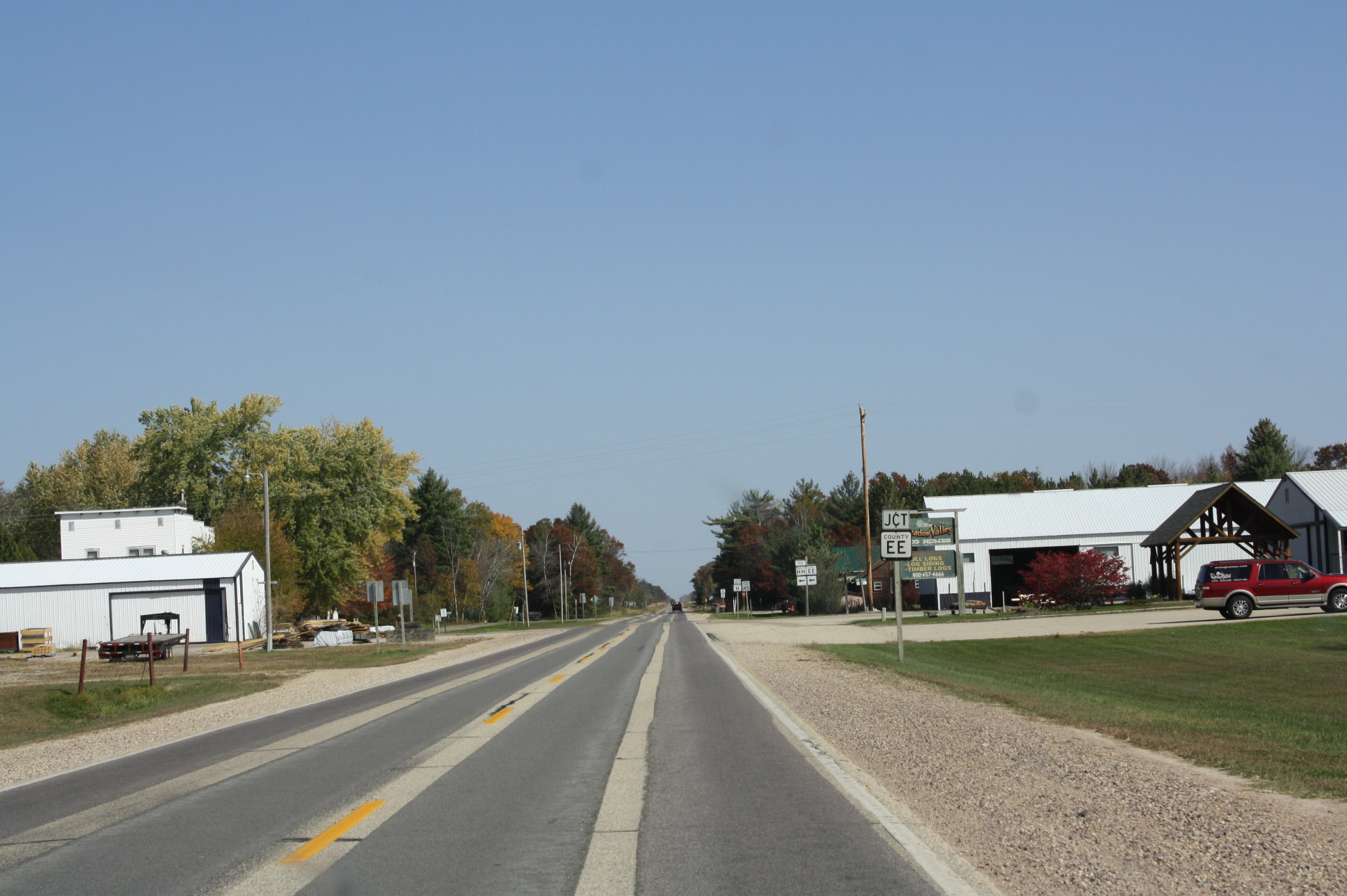
- Downtown Mather

- Location within Wisconsin Location within the United States
- Coordinates: 44°08′34″N 90°18′31″W
- Country: United States
- State: Wisconsin
- County: Juneau
- Town: Kingston
- Elevation: 961 ft (293 m)
- Time zone: UTC-6 (Central (CST))
  - Summer (DST): UTC-5 (CDT)
- ZIP code: 54641
- Area code: 608
- GNIS feature ID: 1569120

Mather is an unincorporated community in the town of Kingston in Juneau County, Wisconsin, United States. It is located on Wisconsin Highway 173 (WIS 173), 16 miles (26 km) northeast of Tomah. Mather has a post office with ZIP code 54641.

== History ==
The Wisconsin Valley Railroad (later the Milwaukee Road) once passed through Mather on its route from Tomah to northern Wisconsin. The Tomah to Babcock portion was abandoned in stages in the 1920s and 1930s, and WIS 173 was built on the right-of-way. A short-lived branch line also ran northwest from Mather to serve logging interests and several tiny communities in eastern Jackson County, and was abandoned by 1900.

== Images ==
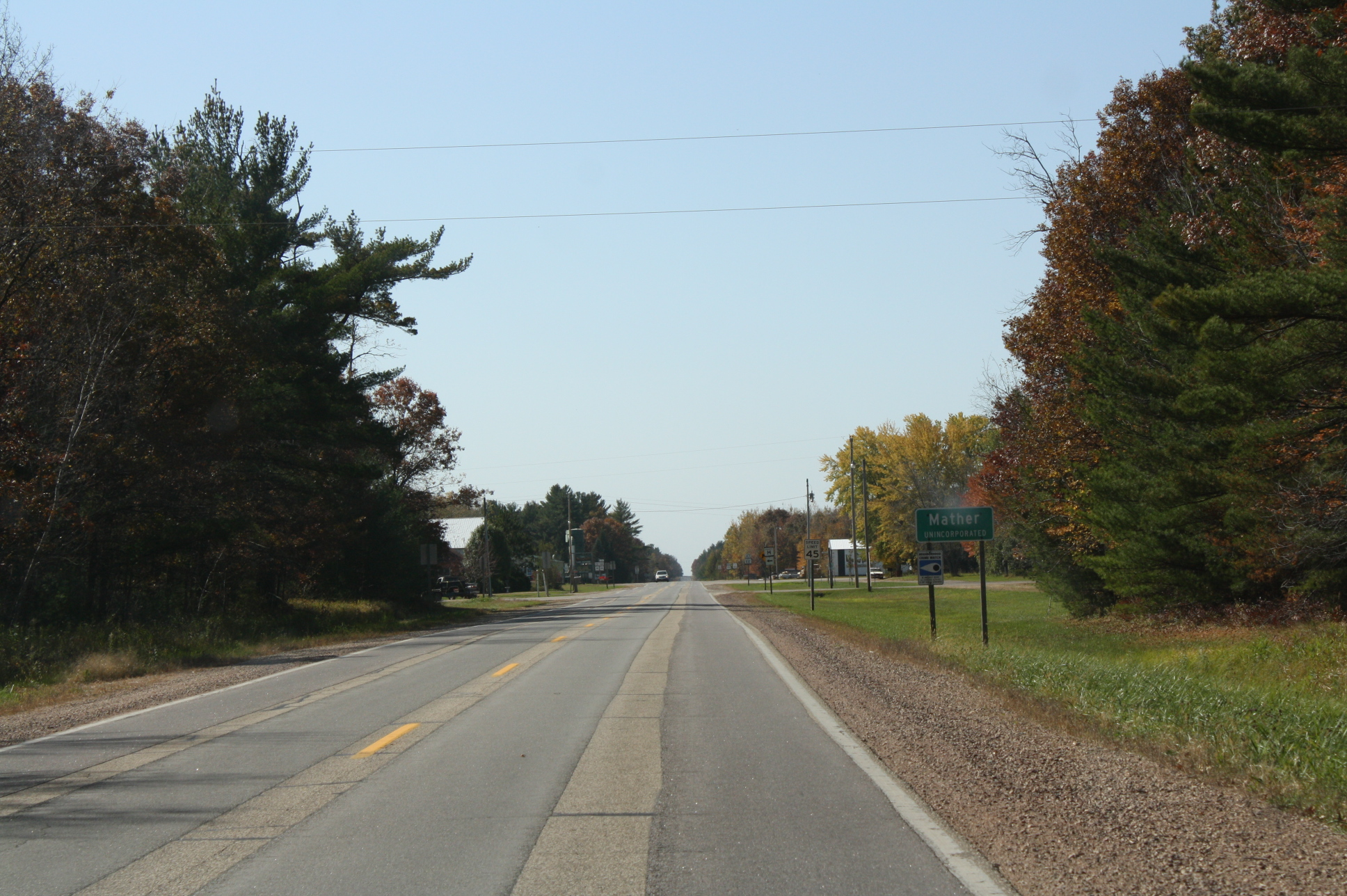
Sign on WIS 173

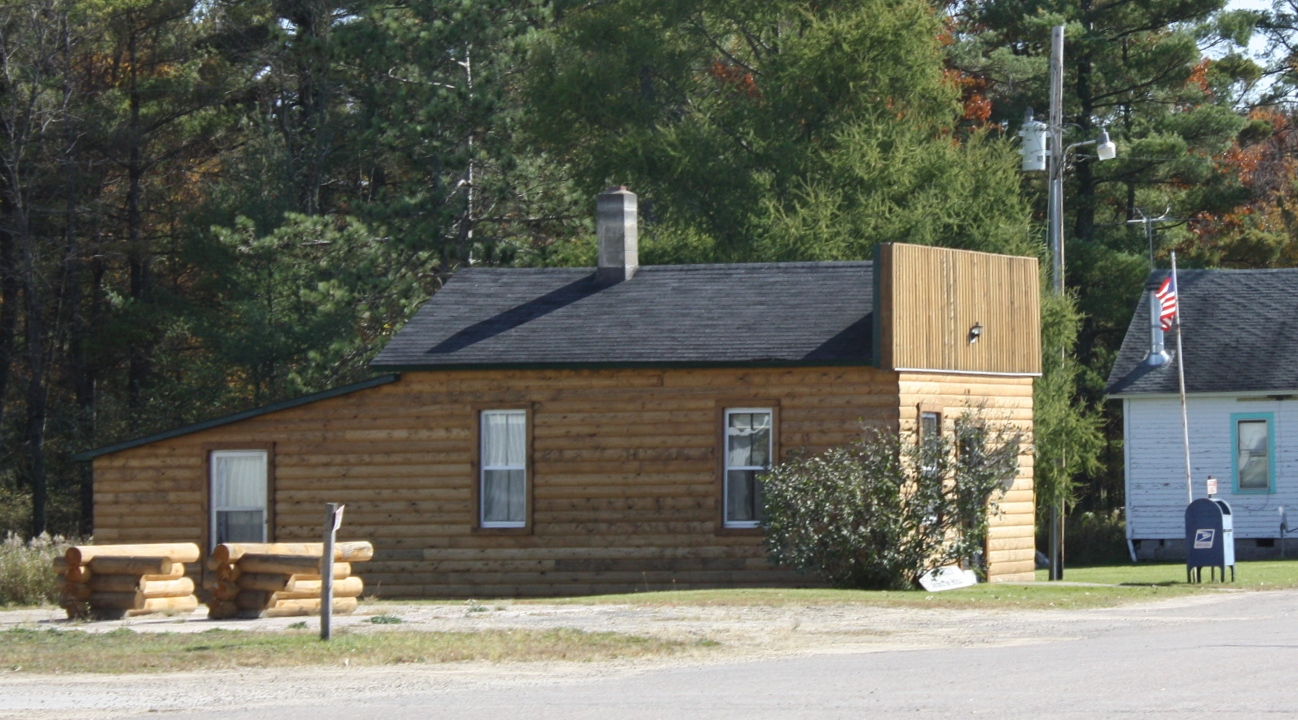
Post office

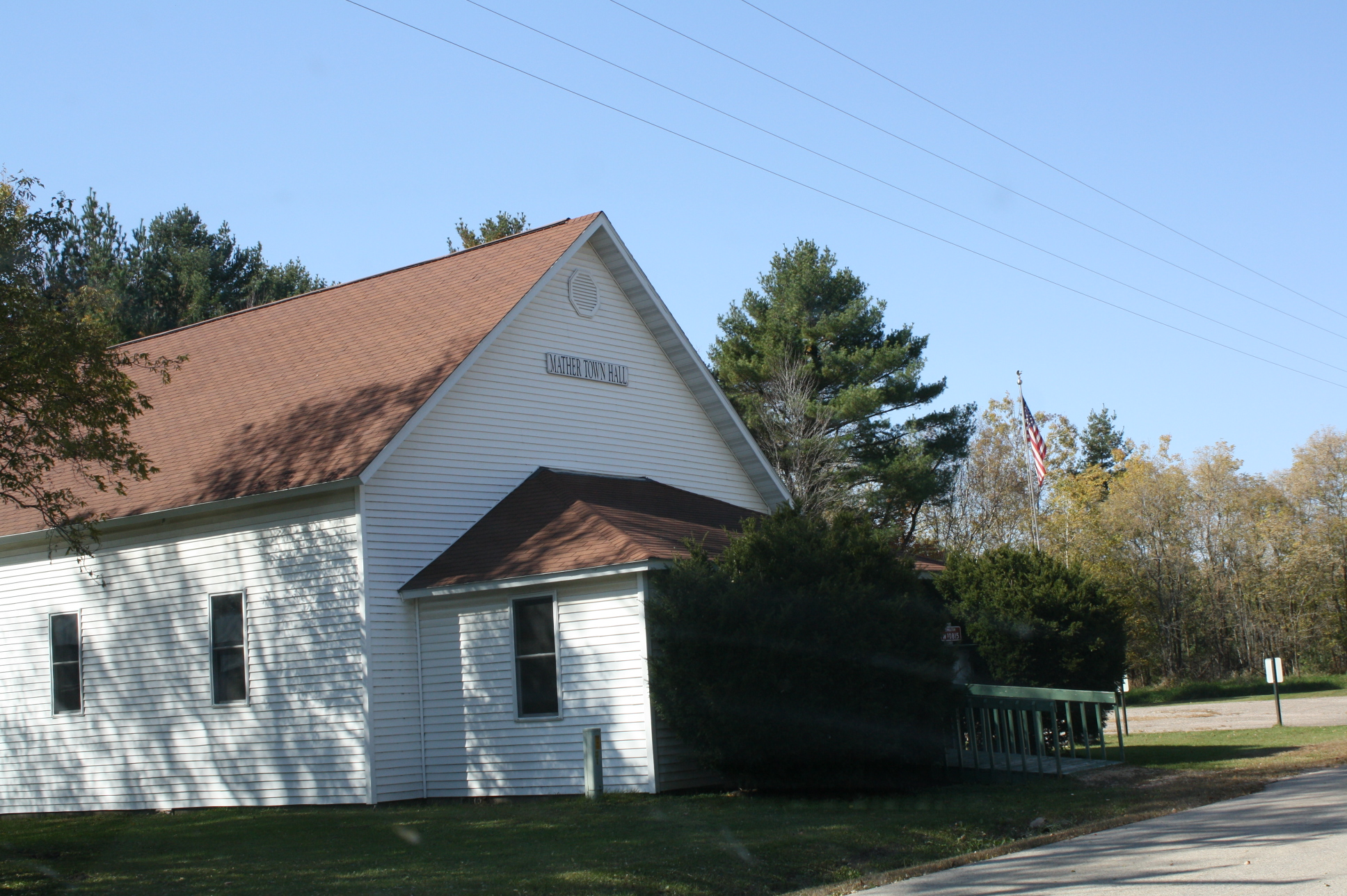
Town hall

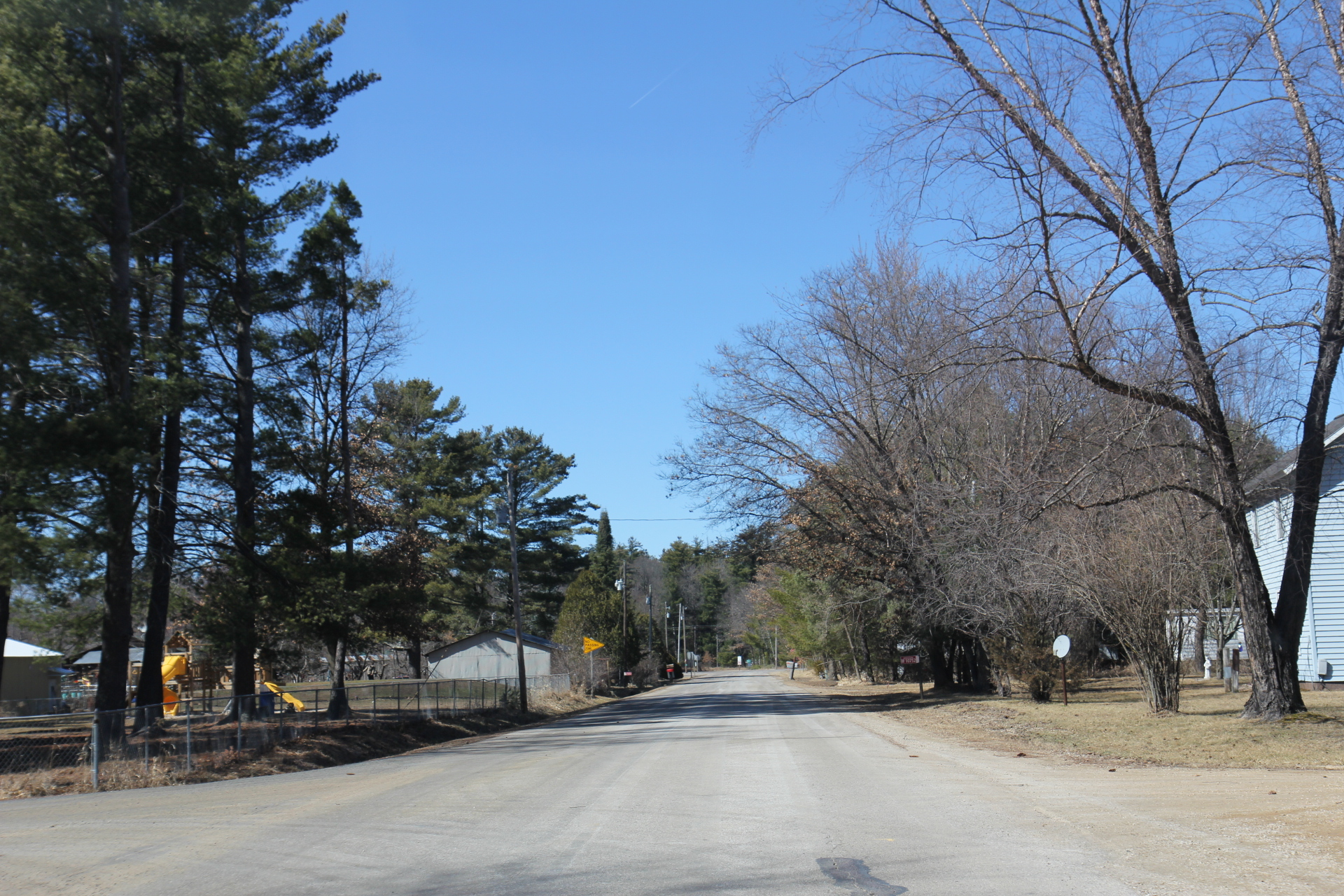
Looking west while entering Mather on County Highway H
