= Byron, Monroe County, Wisconsin =

Byron, Wisconsin
- Town
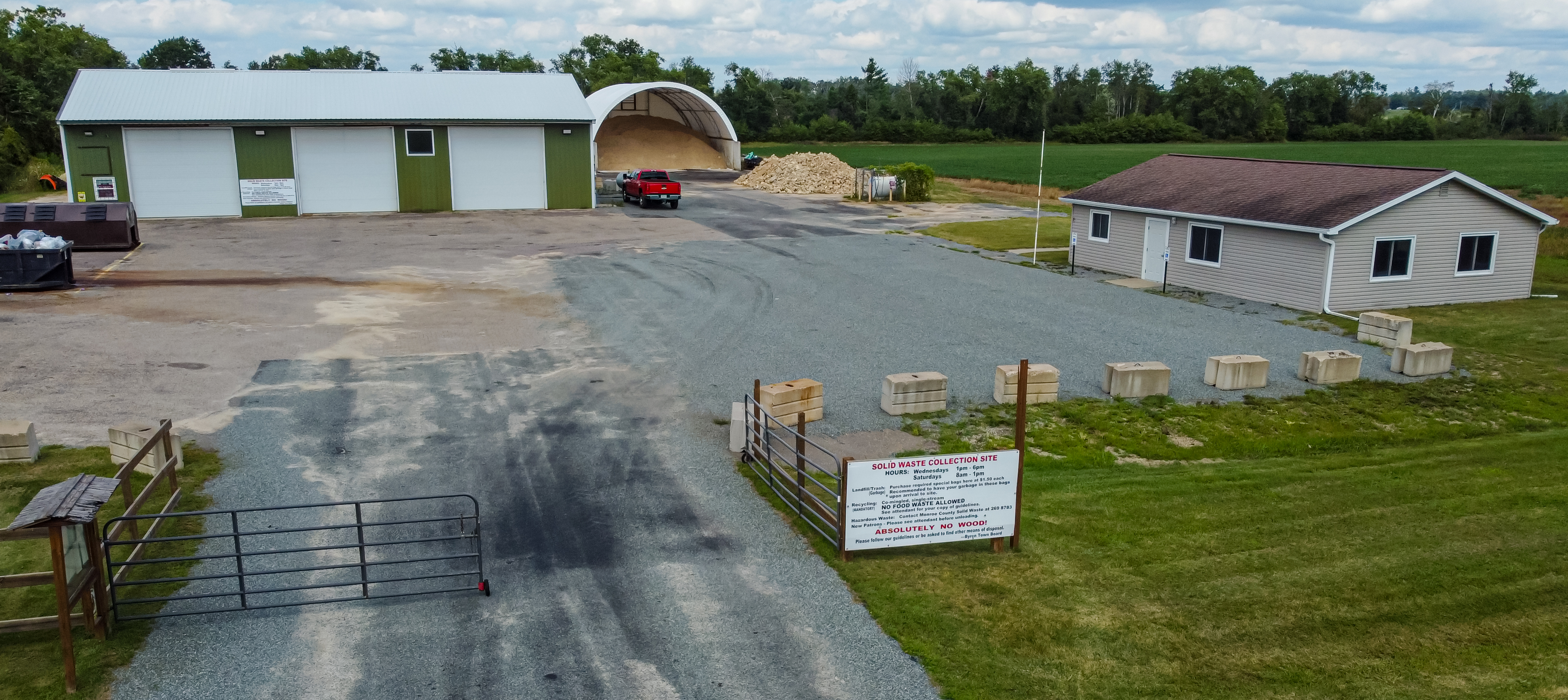
- Town hall on Wis-21 east of Wyeville

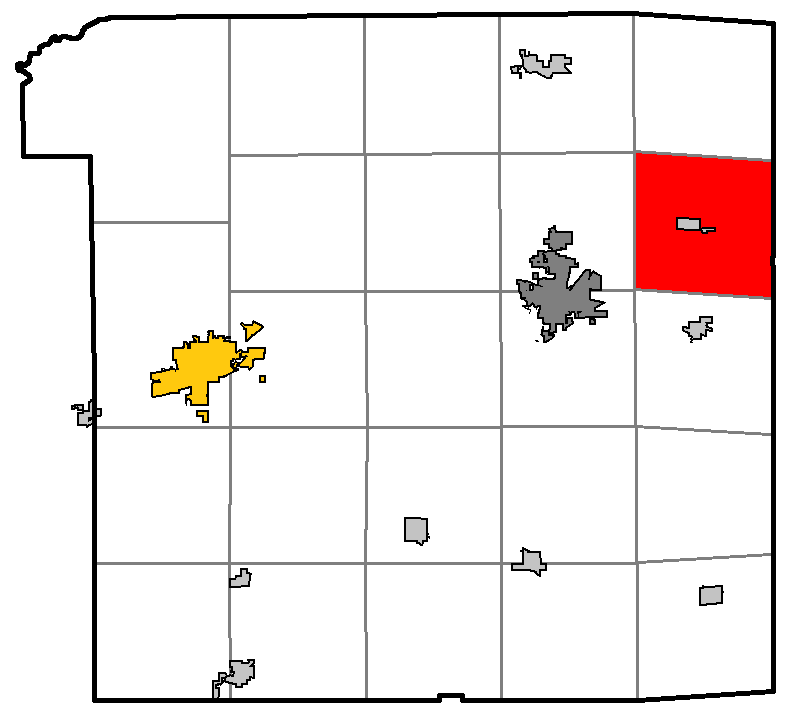
- Location of Byron, Monroe County, Wisconsin

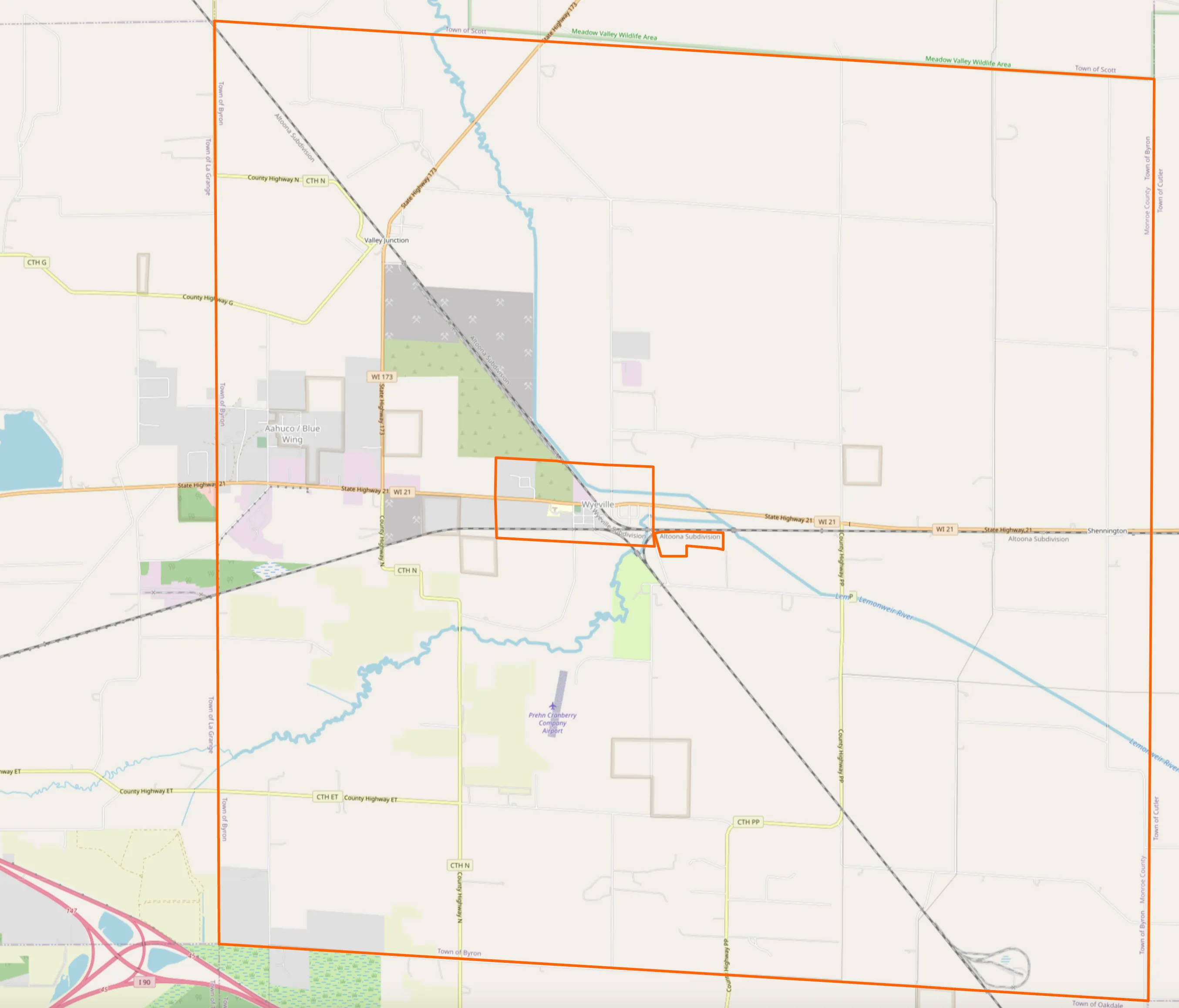
- Coordinates: 44°2′8″N 90°22′45″W
- Country: United States
- State: Wisconsin
- County: Monroe

Area
  - Total: 36.1 sq mi (93.4 km^{2})
  - Land: 35.5 sq mi (91.9 km^{2})
  - Water: 0.58 sq mi (1.5 km^{2})
- Elevation: 906 ft (276 m)

Population (2020)
  - Total: 1,234
  - Density: 34.8/sq mi (13.4/km^{2})
- Time zone: UTC-6 (Central (CST))
  - Summer (DST): UTC-5 (CDT)
- Area code: 608
- FIPS code: 55-11625
- GNIS feature ID: 1582897

Byron is a town in Monroe County, Wisconsin, United States. The population was 1,234 at the 2020 census. The unincorporated communities of Shennington and Valley Junction are located in the town.

== Geography ==
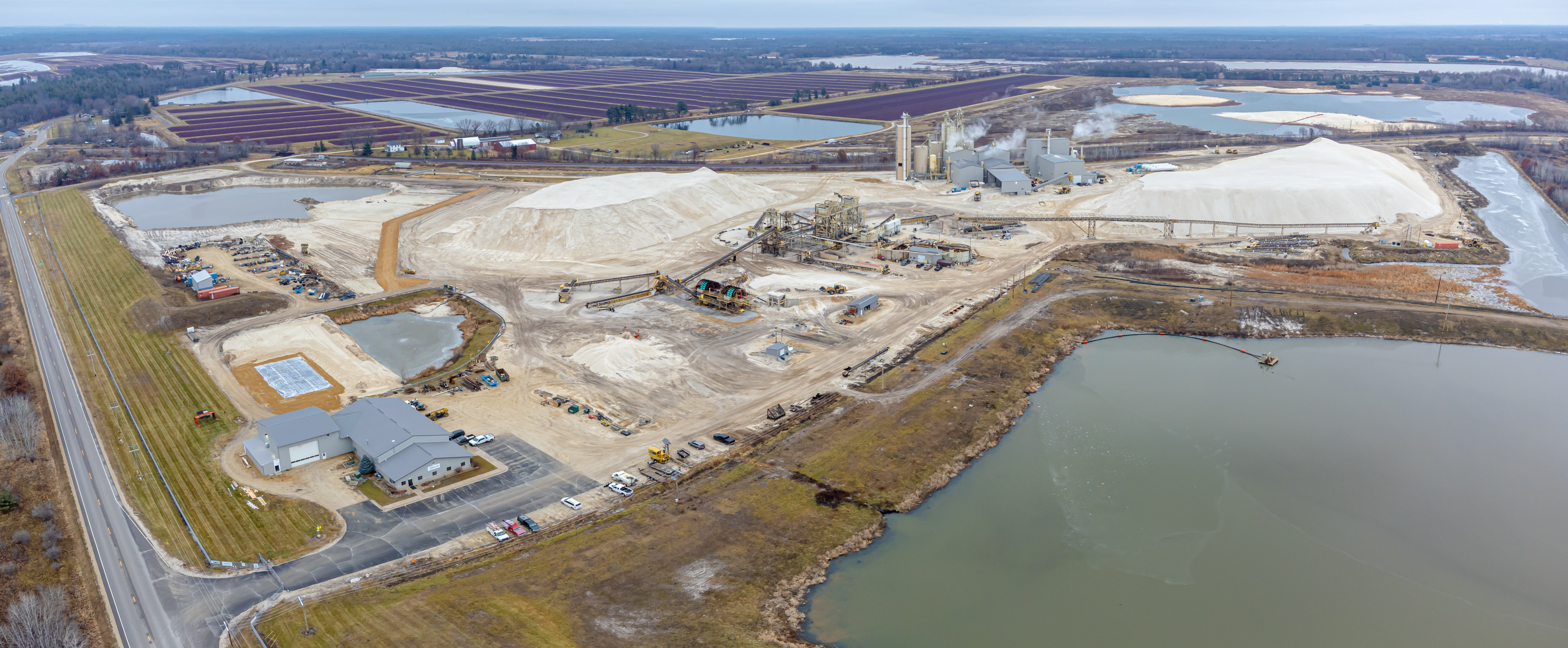
Frac sand mine in Byron on Wis-173

According to the United States Census Bureau, the town has a total area of 36.1 square miles (93.4 km^{2}), of which 35.5 square miles (91.9 km^{2}) is land and 0.6 square mile (1.5 km^{2}) (1.61%) is water.

== Demographics ==
As of the census of 2000, there were 1,394 people, 501 households, and 384 families residing in the town. The population density was 39.3 people per square mile (15.2/km^{2}). There were 556 housing units at an average density of 15.7 per square mile (6.1/km^{2}). The racial makeup of the town was 90.46% White, 0.14% African American, 7.39% Native American, 0.36% Asian, 0.43% from other races, and 1.22% from two or more races. Hispanic or Latino of any race were 1.94% of the population.

There were 501 households, out of which 36.5% had children under the age of 18 living with them, 64.1% were married couples living together, 7.8% had a female householder with no husband present, and 23.2% were non-families. 18.0% of all households were made up of individuals, and 4.6% had someone living alone who was 65 years of age or older. The average household size was 2.78 and the average family size was 3.15.

In the town, the population was spread out, with 30.3% under the age of 18, 6.3% from 18 to 24, 27.8% from 25 to 44, 26.6% from 45 to 64, and 9.0% who were 65 years of age or older. The median age was 36 years. For every 100 females, there were 108.4 males. For every 100 females age 18 and over, there were 103.8 males.

The median income for a household in the town was $40,583, and the median income for a family was $44,286. Males had a median income of $30,750 versus $24,271 for females. The per capita income for the town was $16,707. About 6.8% of families and 10.3% of the population were below the poverty line, including 17.2% of those under age 18 and 8.8% of those age 65 or over.

== See also ==
- List of towns in Wisconsin
