= Adrian, Wisconsin =

Town of Adrian
- Town
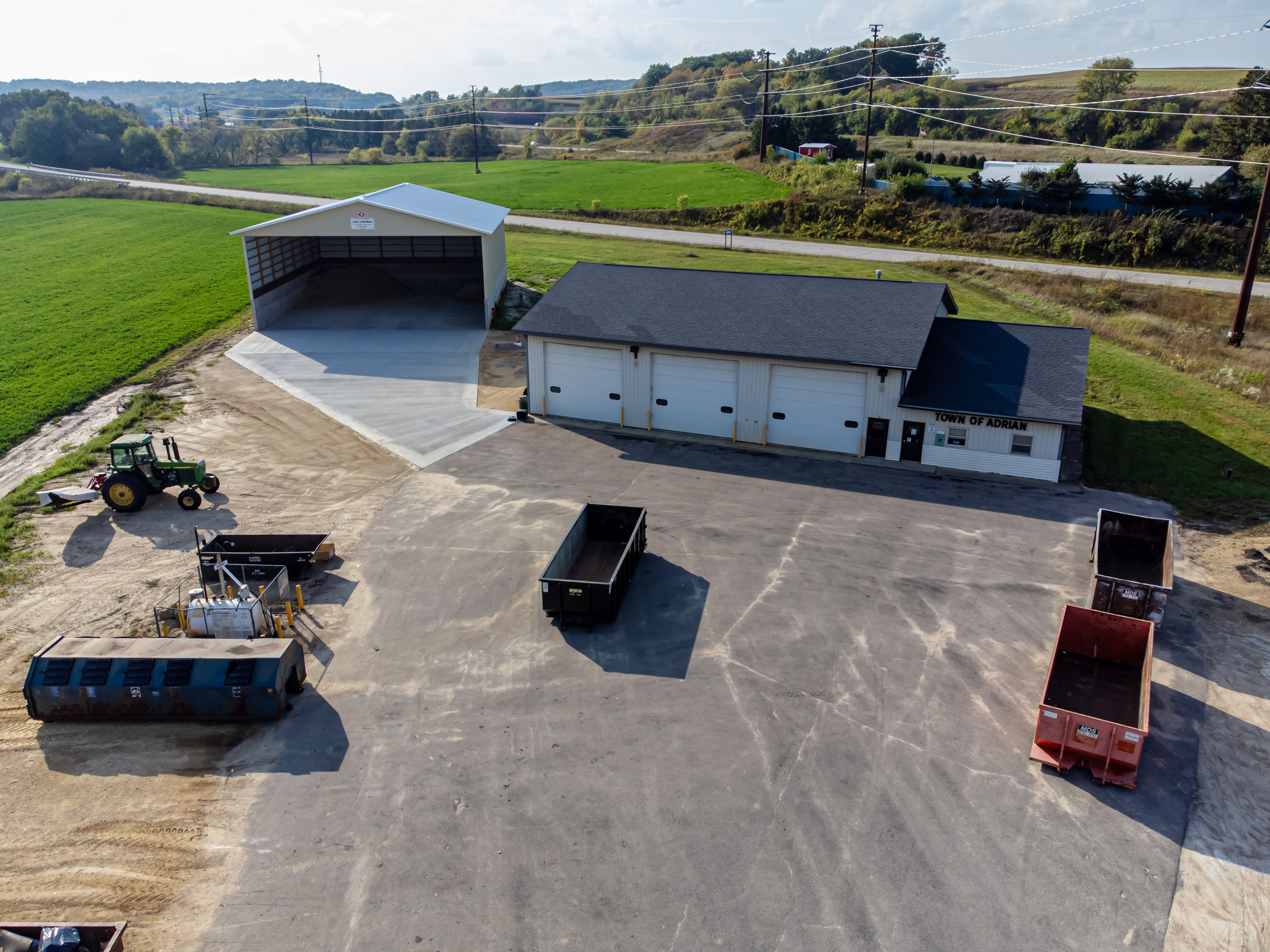
- Adrian Town Hall

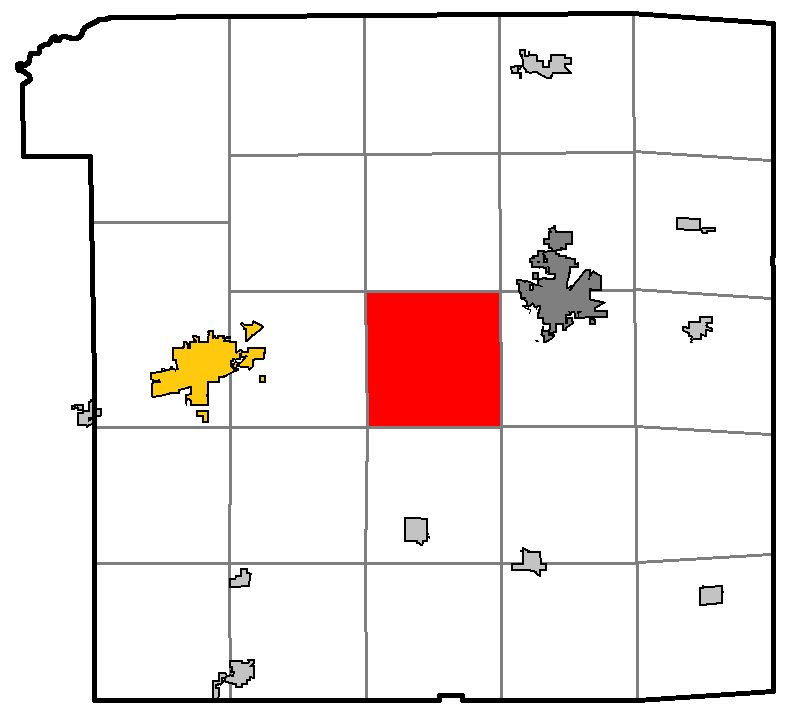
- Location of the Town of Adrian, Monroe County

- Location of Monroe County, Wisconsin
- Coordinates: 43°56′20″N 90°37′4″W
- Country: United States
- State: Wisconsin
- County: Monroe

Area
  - Total: 35.3 sq mi (91.3 km^{2})
  - Land: 35.3 sq mi (91.3 km^{2})
  - Water: 0 sq mi (0.0 km^{2})
- Elevation: 1,135 ft (346 m)

Population (2020)
  - Total: 733
  - Density: 20.8/sq mi (8.03/km^{2})
- Time zone: UTC-6 (Central (CST))
  - Summer (DST): UTC-5 (CDT)
- Area code: 608
- FIPS code: 55-00475
- GNIS feature ID: 1582659
- Website: https://adriantownshipwi.gov/

The Town of Adrian is located in Monroe County, Wisconsin, United States. The population at the 2020 census was 733.
