= Monroe County, Wisconsin =

County in Wisconsin, United States

- County
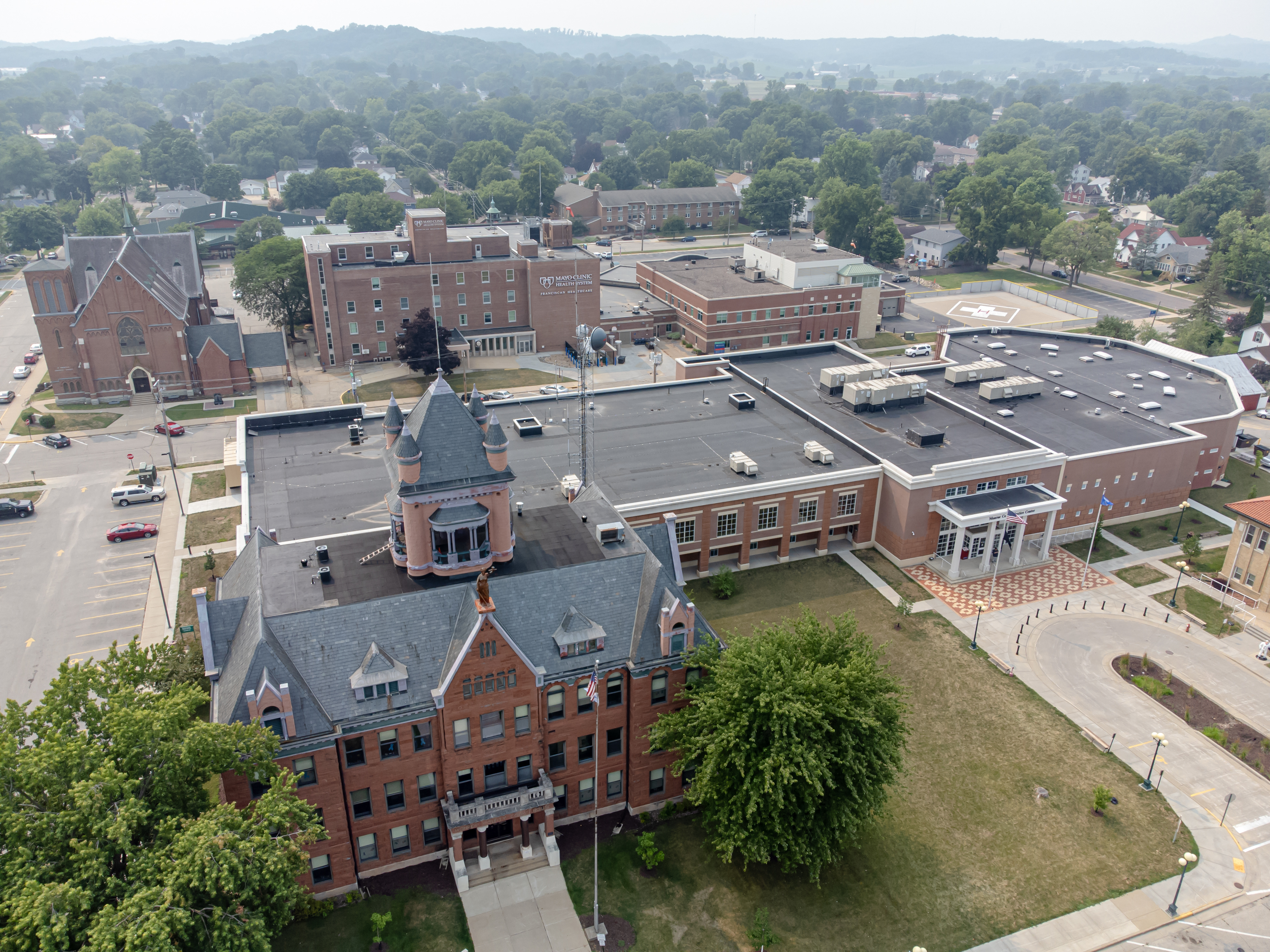
- Monroe County Courthouse in Sparta

- Location within the U.S. state of Wisconsin
- Coordinates: 43°57′N 90°37′W
- Country: United States
- State: Wisconsin
- Founded: 1854 DT Moseley was the first white child born to settlers in Monroe County.
- Named for: James Monroe
- Seat: Sparta
- Largest city: Sparta

Area
  - Total: 908 sq mi (2,350 km^{2})
  - Land: 901 sq mi (2,330 km^{2})
  - Water: 7.4 sq mi (19 km^{2}) 0.8%

Population (2020)
  - Total: 46,274
  - Estimate (2025): 46,572 ▲
  - Density: 51.5/sq mi (19.9/km^{2})
- Time zone: UTC−6 (Central)
  - Summer (DST): UTC−5 (CDT)
- Congressional districts: 3rd, 7th
- Website: www.co.monroe.wi.us

Monroe County is a county in the U.S. state of Wisconsin. As of the 2020 census, the population was 46,274. Its county seat is Sparta.

== Geography ==
According to the U.S. Census Bureau, the county has a total area of 908 square miles (2,350 km^{2}), of which 901 square miles (2,330 km^{2}) is land and 7.4 square miles (19 km^{2}) (0.8%) is water.

=== United States Army posts ===
- Fort McCoy, Wisconsin

=== Adjacent counties ===
- Jackson County – north
- Juneau County – east
- Vernon County – south
- La Crosse County – west

== Demographics ==
Historical population
Census	Pop.	Note	%±
1860	8,410		—
1870	16,550		96.8%
1880	21,607		30.6%
1890	23,211		7.4%
1900	28,103		21.1%
1910	28,881		2.8%
1920	28,666		−0.7%
1930	28,739		0.3%
1940	30,080		4.7%
1950	31,378		4.3%
1960	31,241		−0.4%
1970	31,610		1.2%
1980	35,074		11.0%
1990	36,633		4.4%
2000	40,899		11.6%
2010	44,673		9.2%
2020	46,274		3.6%
2025 (est.)	46,572	▲	0.6%
U.S. Decennial Census; 1790–1960 1900–1990; 1990–2000 2010–2020

=== Racial and ethnic composition ===
Monroe County, Wisconsin – Racial and ethnic composition Note: the US Census treats Hispanic/Latino as an ethnic category. This table excludes Latinos from the racial categories and assigns them to a separate category. Hispanics/Latinos may be of any race.
Race / ethnicity (NH = Non-Hispanic)	Pop 1980	Pop 1990	Pop 2000	Pop 2010	Pop 2020	% 1980	% 1990	% 2000	% 2010	% 2020
White alone (NH)	34,558	35,836	39,135	41,260	40,608	98.53%	97.82%	95.69%	92.36%	87.76%
Black or African American alone (NH)	46	136	181	475	620	0.13%	0.37%	0.44%	1.06%	1.34%
Native American or Alaska Native alone (NH)	241	288	363	464	493	0.69%	0.79%	0.89%	1.04%	1.07%
Asian alone (NH)	71	133	195	281	352	0.20%	0.36%	0.48%	0.63%	0.76%
Native Hawaiian or Pacific Islander alone (NH)	x	x	14	40	63	x	x	0.03%	0.09%	0.14%
Other race alone (NH)	33	6	15	15	111	0.09%	0.02%	0.04%	0.03%	0.24%
Mixed race or Multiracial (NH)	x	x	256	477	1,467	x	x	0.63%	1.07%	3.17%
Hispanic or Latino (any race)	125	234	740	1,661	2,560	0.36%	0.64%	1.81%	3.72%	5.53%
Total	35,074	36,633	40,899	44,673	46,274	100.00%	100.00%	100.00%	100.00%	100.00%

=== 2020 census ===
As of the 2020 census, the county had a population of 46,274 and a median age of 39.6 years. 25.1% of residents were under the age of 18 and 18.0% of residents were 65 years of age or older. For every 100 females there were 102.3 males, and for every 100 females age 18 and over there were 102.6 males age 18 and over.

The population density was 51.4 people per square mile (19.8 people/km^{2}). There were 19,769 housing units at an average density of 21.9 units per square mile (8.5 units/km^{2}).

The racial makeup of the county was 89.2% White, 1.4% Black or African American, 1.3% American Indian and Alaska Native, 0.8% Asian, 0.1% Native Hawaiian and Pacific Islander, 2.1% from some other race, and 5.0% from two or more races. Hispanic or Latino residents of any race comprised 5.5% of the population.

43.2% of residents lived in urban areas, while 56.8% lived in rural areas.

There were 18,197 households in the county, of which 30.3% had children under the age of 18 living in them. Of all households, 50.3% were married-couple households, 20.0% were households with a male householder and no spouse or partner present, and 21.3% were households with a female householder and no spouse or partner present. About 27.8% of all households were made up of individuals and 11.7% had someone living alone who was 65 years of age or older.

There were 19,769 housing units, of which 8.0% were vacant. Among occupied housing units, 69.5% were owner-occupied and 30.5% were renter-occupied. The homeowner vacancy rate was 1.3% and the rental vacancy rate was 4.9%.

=== 2000 census ===
2000 Census Age Pyramid for Monroe County.

As of the census of 2000, there were 40,899 people, 15,399 households, and 10,794 families residing in the county. The population density was 45 people per square mile (17 people/km^{2}). There were 16,672 housing units at an average density of 18 units per square mile (6.9 units/km^{2}). The racial makeup of the county was 96.52% White, 0.46% Black or African American, 0.92% Native American, 0.48% Asian, 0.04% Pacific Islander, 0.85% from other races, and 0.74% from two or more races. 1.81% of the population were Hispanic or Latino of any race. 45.5% were of German, 13.4% Norwegian, 7.6% Irish, 6.3% American and 5.0% English ancestry. 92.9% spoke English, 3.1% German and 2.2% Spanish as their first language.

There were 15,399 households, out of which 34.50% had children under the age of 18 living with them, 56.70% were married couples living together, 8.80% had a female householder with no husband present, and 29.90% were non-families. 25.00% of all households were made up of individuals, and 10.70% had someone living alone who was 65 years of age or older. The average household size was 2.60 and the average family size was 3.11.

In the county, the population was spread out, with 28.10% under the age of 18, 7.70% from 18 to 24, 27.50% from 25 to 44, 22.80% from 45 to 64, and 13.90% who were 65 years of age or older. The median age was 37 years. For every 100 females there were 101.50 males. For every 100 females age 18 and over, there were 99.60 males.

In 2017, there were 534 births, giving a general fertility rate of 67.9 births per 1000 women aged 15–44, the 21st highest rate out of all 72 Wisconsin counties. Of these, 43 of the births occurred at home. Additionally, there were 21 reported induced abortions performed on women of Monroe County residence in 2017.

In 2010, the reported adherence figures for the largest religious groups in Monroe County were Catholic at 9,250 adherents, Wisconsin Synod Lutheran at 3,102 adherents, ELCA Lutheran at 2,297 adherents, Amish at 1,627 adherents, LCMC Lutheran at 1,270 adherents, and United Methodist at 1,155 adherents.

== Transportation ==
=== Major highways ===
- Interstate 90
- Interstate 94
- U.S. Highway 12
- Highway 16 (Wisconsin)
- Highway 21 (Wisconsin)
- Highway 27 (Wisconsin)
- Highway 33 (Wisconsin)
- Highway 71 (Wisconsin)
- Highway 131 (Wisconsin)
- Highway 162 (Wisconsin)
- Highway 173 (Wisconsin)

=== Railroads ===
- Canadian Pacific
- Union Pacific
- Amtrak
- Tomah station

=== Buses ===
- Scenic Mississippi Regional Transit

=== Airports ===
- Sparta/Fort McCoy Airport
- Bloyer Field Airport (Y72)

== Communities ==
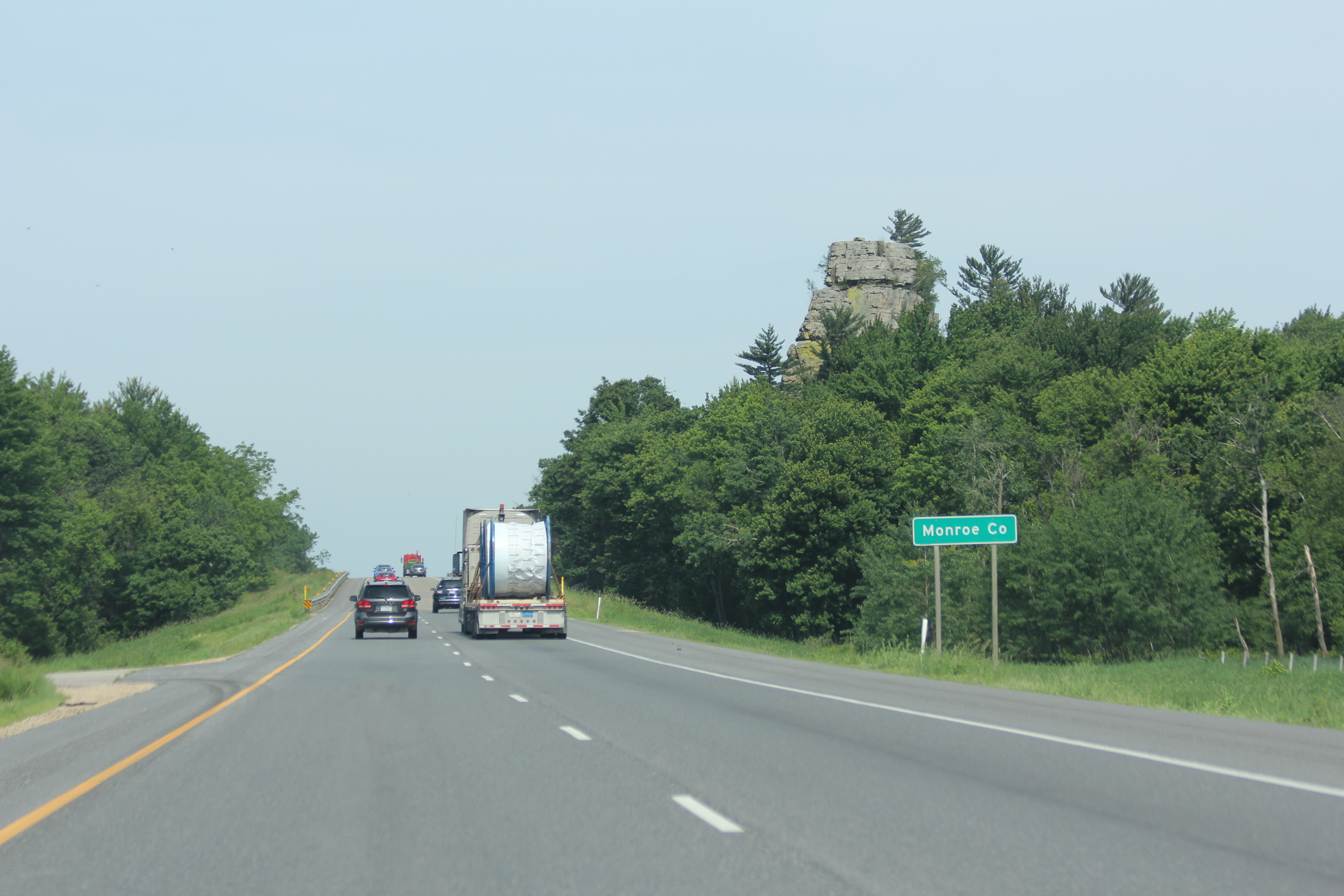
Monroe County sign on Interstate 90

=== Cities ===
- Sparta (county seat)
- Tomah

=== Villages ===
- Cashton
- Kendall
- Melvina
- Norwalk
- Oakdale
- Warrens
- Wilton
- Wyeville

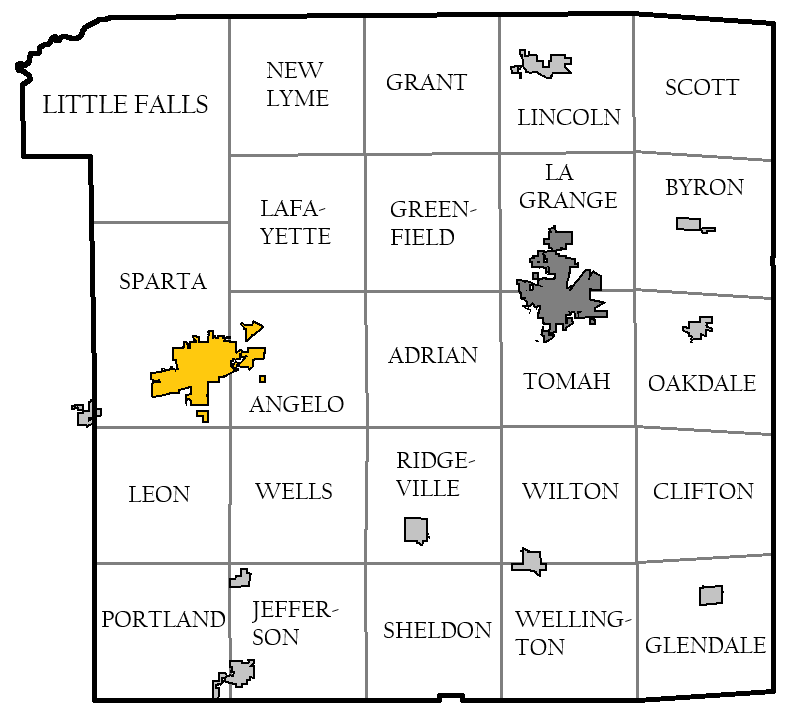
Towns of Monroe County

=== Towns ===
- Adrian
- Angelo
- Byron
- Clifton
- Glendale
- Grant
- Greenfield
- Jefferson
- La Grange
- Lafayette
- Leon
- Lincoln
- Little Falls
- New Lyme
- Oakdale
- Portland
- Ridgeville
- Scott
- Sheldon
- Sparta
- Tomah
- Wellington
- Wells
- Wilton

=== Census-designated places ===
- Cataract
- Tunnel City

=== Unincorporated communities ===
- Angelo
- Clifton
- Farmers Valley
- Four Corners
- Glendale
- Jacksonville
- Kirby
- Leon
- Norway Ridge
- Oil City
- Portland
- Raymore
- Ridgeville
- St. Mary's
- Scotts Junction
- Shennington
- Spring Bank Park
- Valley Junction

== Economy ==
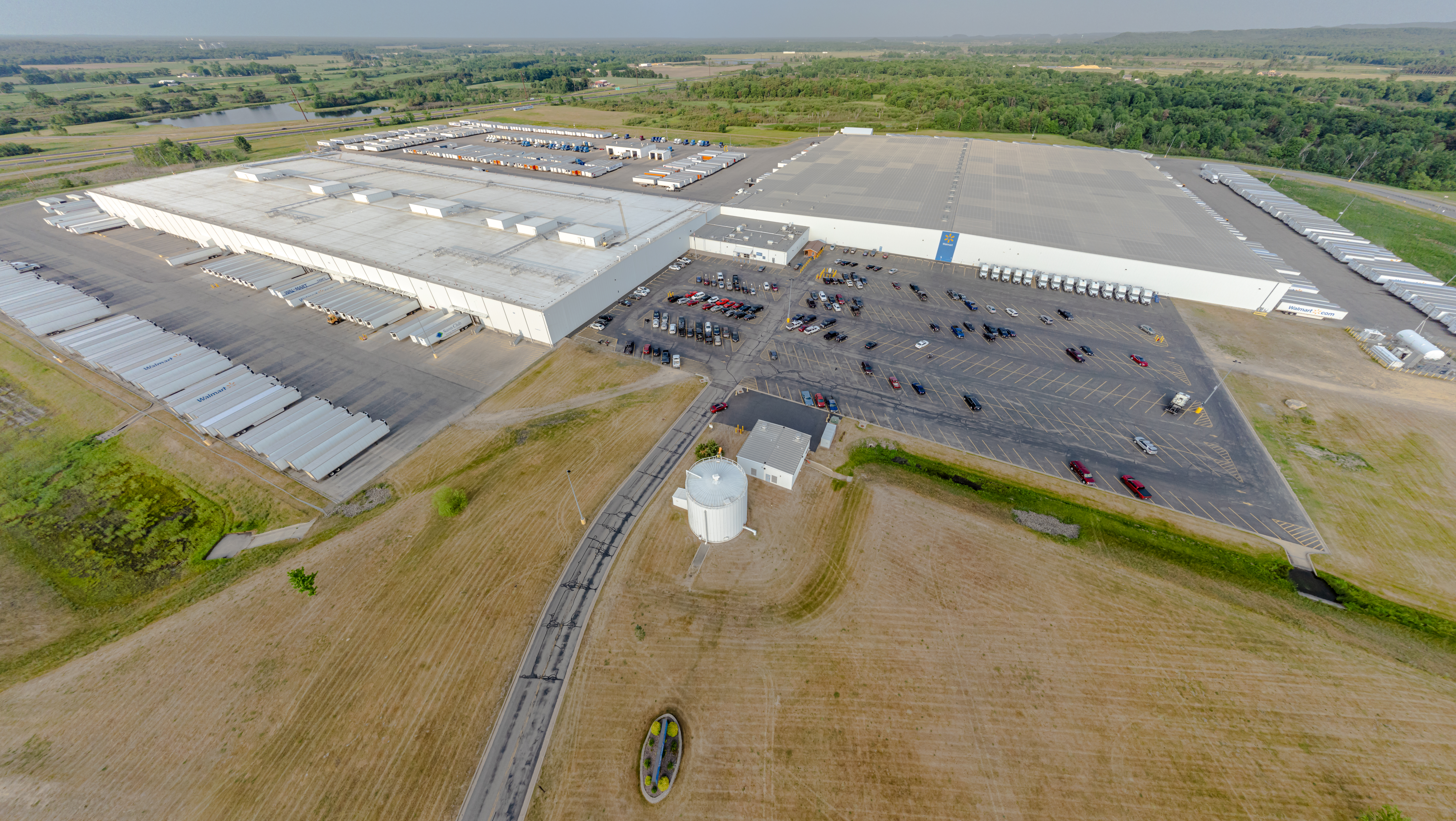
Walmart distribution center in Tomah, Wisconsin

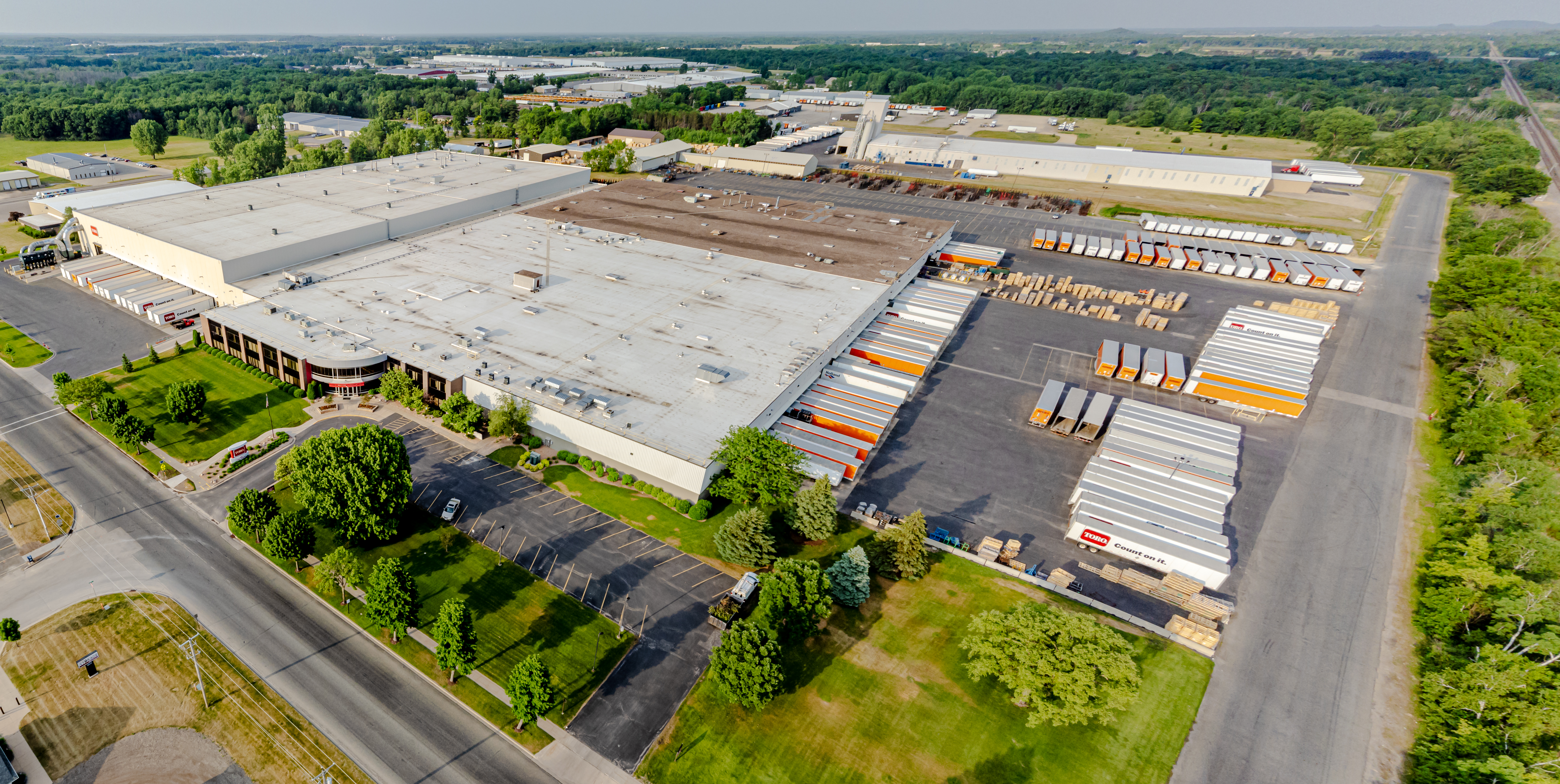
Toro plant in Tomah, Wisconsin

=== Largest employers ===
1. Tomah VA Medical Center
2. Dept. of Defense
3. Walmart distribution center
4. Toro
5. County of Monroe
6. Northern Engraving
7. Century Foods
8. Cardinal Glass Industries
9. Wal-Mart stores
10. Tomah Memorial Hospital

== Politics ==
United States presidential election results for Monroe County, Wisconsin
Year	Republican		Democratic		Third party(ies)	
Year	No.	%	No.	%	No.	%
1892	2,530	47.14%	2,458	45.80%	379	7.06%
1896	3,683	59.46%	2,361	38.12%	150	2.42%
1900	3,709	60.31%	2,247	36.54%	194	3.15%
1904	3,892	66.77%	1,749	30.01%	188	3.23%
1908	3,304	58.11%	2,155	37.90%	227	3.99%
1912	1,841	38.13%	2,084	43.16%	903	18.70%
1916	3,013	57.58%	1,991	38.05%	229	4.38%
1920	6,784	83.29%	977	12.00%	384	4.71%
1924	2,661	26.70%	428	4.30%	6,876	69.00%
1928	5,936	60.83%	3,709	38.01%	114	1.17%
1932	3,022	30.36%	6,757	67.88%	175	1.76%
1936	4,695	39.10%	6,491	54.06%	822	6.85%
1940	8,042	62.52%	4,673	36.33%	148	1.15%
1944	7,277	64.09%	4,013	35.34%	64	0.56%
1948	5,347	50.97%	4,970	47.38%	173	1.65%
1952	8,744	69.98%	3,717	29.75%	34	0.27%
1956	7,460	63.16%	4,311	36.50%	40	0.34%
1960	7,410	58.87%	5,161	41.00%	16	0.13%
1964	5,126	44.48%	6,385	55.41%	13	0.11%
1968	6,938	57.74%	4,012	33.39%	1,065	8.86%
1972	7,625	66.68%	3,640	31.83%	171	1.50%
1976	7,242	51.85%	6,465	46.28%	261	1.87%
1980	8,136	51.87%	6,521	41.58%	1,027	6.55%
1984	8,227	59.26%	5,567	40.10%	90	0.65%
1988	7,073	52.06%	6,437	47.38%	75	0.55%
1992	6,118	36.41%	6,427	38.24%	4,260	25.35%
1996	5,299	36.29%	6,924	47.42%	2,377	16.28%
2000	8,217	50.30%	7,460	45.67%	658	4.03%
2004	10,375	53.06%	8,973	45.89%	206	1.05%
2008	8,666	45.25%	10,198	53.25%	288	1.50%
2012	9,675	49.65%	9,515	48.83%	295	1.51%
2016	11,356	57.65%	7,052	35.80%	1,291	6.55%
2020	13,775	60.92%	8,433	37.30%	403	1.78%
2024	14,563	62.32%	8,476	36.27%	330	1.41%

For most of its existence, Monroe County has favored the Republican Party. Since 1936, only four Democrats have won the county in presidential races.

== Education ==
School districts include:

- Bangor School District
- Black River Falls School District
- Cashton School District
- Hillsboro School District (Wisconsin)
- Melrose-Mindoro School District
- New Lisbon School District
- Norwalk-Ontario-Wilton School District
- Royall School District
- Sparta Area School District
- Tomah Area School District
- Westby Area School District

== See also ==
- National Register of Historic Places listings in Monroe County, Wisconsin
