= Shennington, Wisconsin =

- Unincorporated community
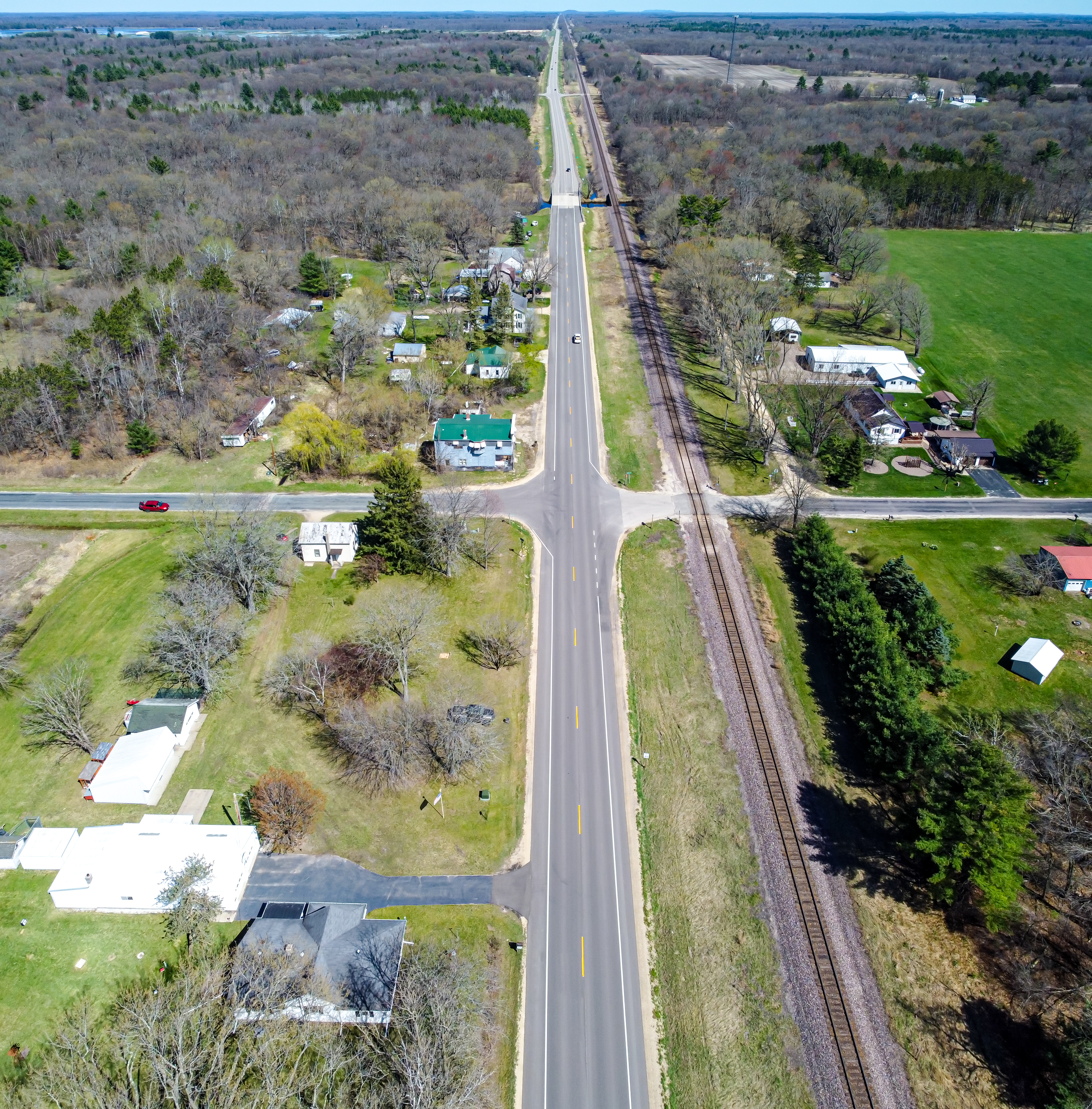
- Wis-21 runs through town

- Location within Wisconsin Location within the United States
- Coordinates: 44°01′33″N 90°19′03″W
- Country: United States
- State: Wisconsin
- County: Monroe
- Elevation: 909 ft (277 m)
- Time zone: UTC-6 (Central (CST))
  - Summer (DST): UTC-5 (CDT)
- Area code: 608
- GNIS feature ID: 1574009

Shennington is an unincorporated community located in the town of Byron at the edge of Monroe County, Wisconsin, United States on Wisconsin Highway 21.

== History ==
A post office called Shennington was established in 1893, and remained in operation until it was discontinued in 1933. The community was named for Fred M. Shenning, founder and first merchant.
