= Finley, Wisconsin =

- Town
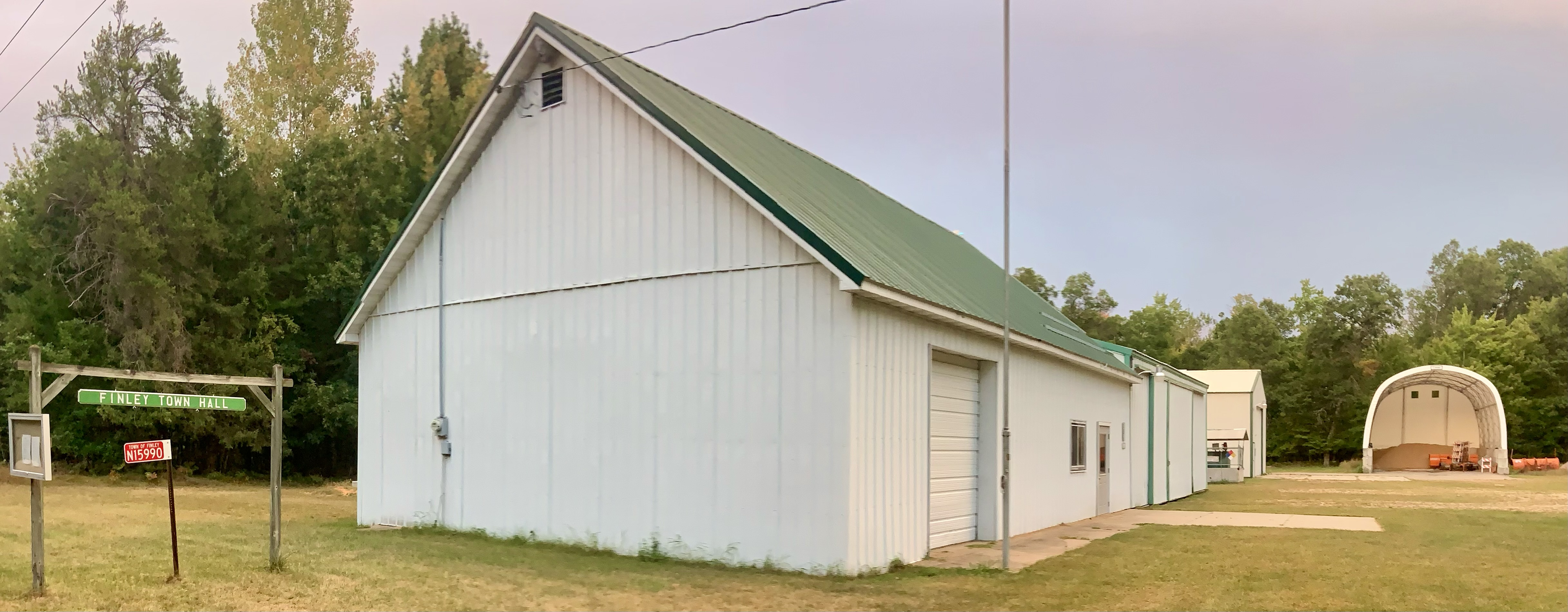
- Town hall

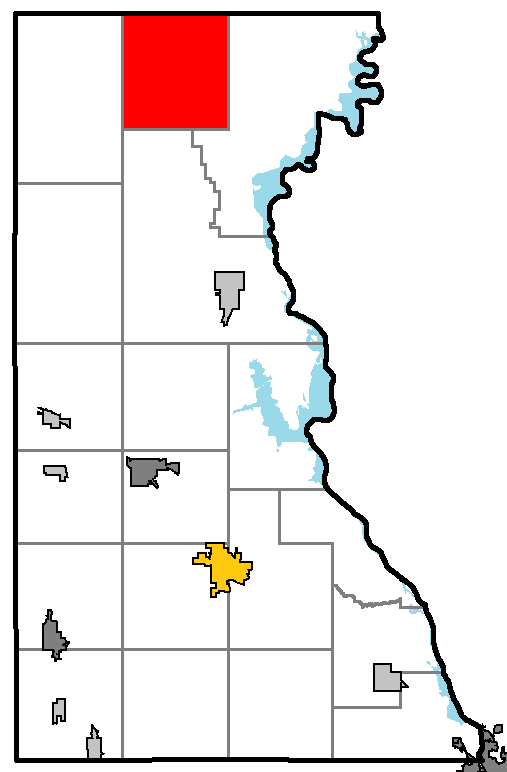
- Location of Finley, Juneau County

- Location of Juneau County, Wisconsin
- Coordinates: 44°11′55″N 90°9′37″W
- Country: United States
- State: Wisconsin
- County: Juneau

Area
  - Total: 38.6 sq mi (99.9 km^{2})
  - Land: 38.3 sq mi (99.1 km^{2})
  - Water: 0.31 sq mi (0.8 km^{2})
- Elevation: 945 ft (288 m)

Population (2020)
  - Total: 88
  - Density: 2.3/sq mi (0.89/km^{2})
- Time zone: UTC-6 (Central (CST))
  - Summer (DST): UTC-5 (CDT)
- Area code: 608
- FIPS code: 55-25850
- GNIS feature ID: 1583203

Finley is a town in Juneau County, Wisconsin, United States. The population was 88 at the 2020 census.

== History ==
Created in the 1890s from parts of Armenia and Kingston, Finley first appeared on the 1900 United States census, with a population of 201.

== Geography ==
According to the United States Census Bureau, the town has a total area of 38.6 square miles (99.9 km^{2}), of which 38.3 square miles (99.1 km^{2}) is land and 0.3 square mile (0.8 km^{2}) (0.78%) is water.

== Demographics ==
As of the census of 2000, there were 84 people, 33 households, and 25 families residing in the town. The population density was 2.2 people per square mile (0.8/km^{2}). There were 97 housing units at an average density of 2.5 per square mile (1.0/km^{2}). The racial makeup of the town was 98.81% White, and 1.19% from two or more races.

There were 33 households, out of which 33.3% had children under the age of 18 living with them, 66.7% were married couples living together, 6.1% had a female householder with no husband present, and 24.2% were non-families. 15.2% of all households were made up of individuals, and 3.0% had someone living alone who was 65 years of age or older. The average household size was 2.55 and the average family size was 2.88.

In the town, the population was spread out, with 27.4% under the age of 18, 3.6% from 18 to 24, 21.4% from 25 to 44, 29.8% from 45 to 64, and 17.9% who were 65 years of age or older. The median age was 42 years. For every 100 females, there were 86.7 males. For every 100 females age 18 and over, there were 103.3 males.

The median income for a household in the town was $31,250, and the median income for a family was $26,250. Males had a median income of $30,625 versus $13,333 for females. The per capita income for the town was $13,715. There were 7.1% of families and 8.4% of the population living below the poverty line, including no under eighteens and none of those over 64.

== See also ==
- List of towns in Wisconsin
