= Wisconsin Highway 174 =

Former state highway in Kenosha County, Wisconsin, United States

State Trunk Highway 174

Route information
- Maintained by WisDOT
- Length: 5.8 mi (9.3 km)
- Existed: 1947–1990

Major junctions
- South end: WIS 31 in Pleasant Prairie
- North end: WIS 50 in Kenosha

Location
- Country: United States
- State: Wisconsin
- Counties: Kenosha

Highway system
- Wisconsin State Trunk Highway System; Interstate; US; State; Scenic; Rustic
← WIS 173	→ WIS 175

State Trunk Highway 174 (Highway 174, STH-174, or WIS 174) was a state highway in the US state of Wisconsin. It traveled northeast from WIS 31 in Pleasant Prairie to WIS 50 in Kenosha.

== Route description ==
Starting at WIS 31, WIS 174 ran northeastward via Springbrook Road. After crossing Kenosha's city limit, WIS 174 transitioned onto 22nd Avenue. The road paralleled WIS 32, which is about a 1/2 mile (0.80 km) to the east. Eventually, it ended at WIS 50 (75th Street).

== History ==
In 1947, WIS 174 was formed, superseding County Trunk Highway Y (CTH-Y) in Kenosha in the process. During its existence, there were no significant changes to it. In 1990, WIS 174 was decommissioned and replaced with CTH-ML.

== Major intersections ==
The entire highway was in Kenosha County.

Location	mi	km	Destinations	Notes
Pleasant Prairie	0.0	0.0	WIS 31	Southern terminus of WIS 174
Kenosha	5.8	9.3	WIS 50	Northern terminus of WIS 174
1.000 mi = 1.609 km; 1.000 km = 0.621 mi
