= Valley Junction, Wisconsin =

- Unincorporated community
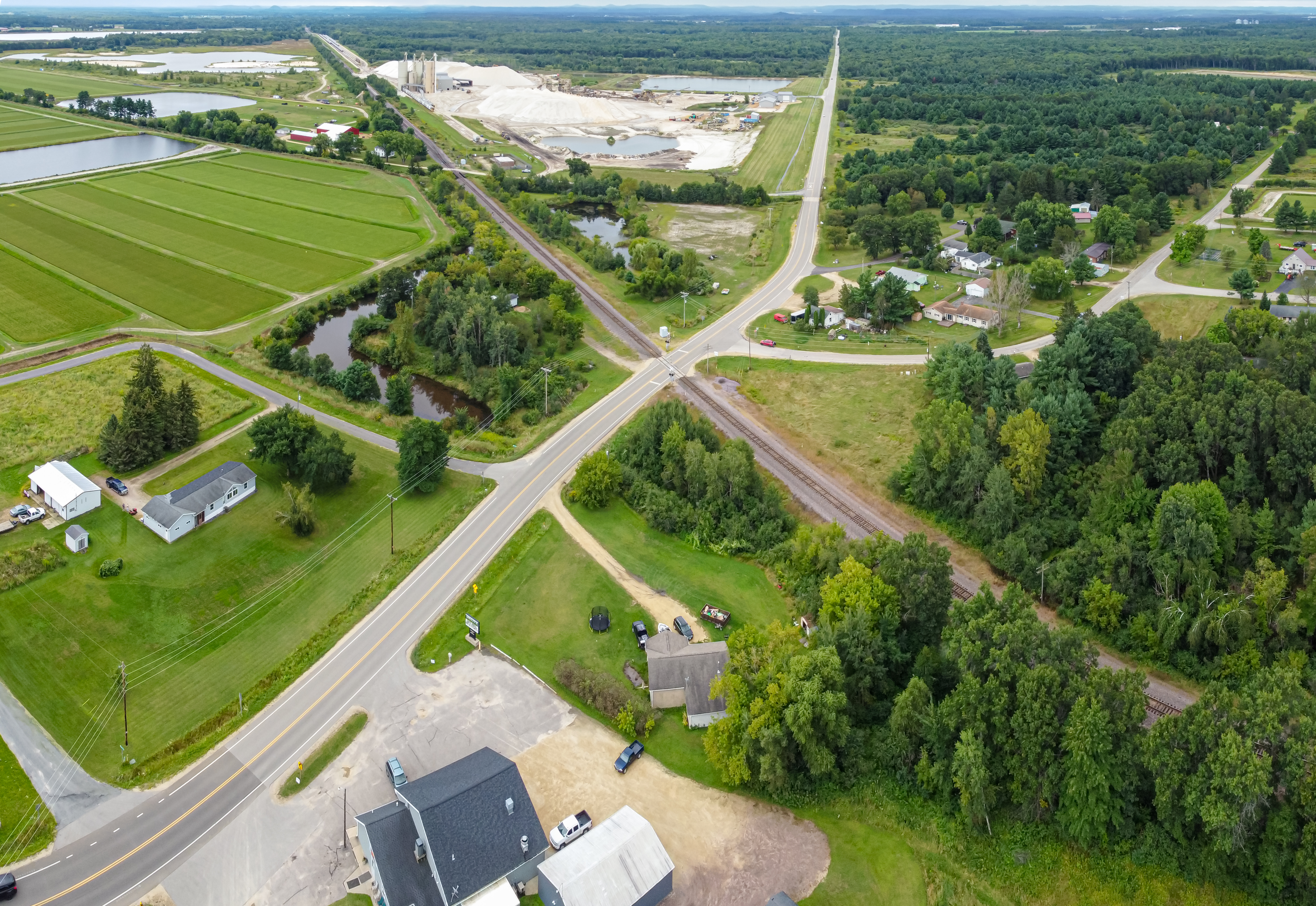

- Location within Wisconsin Location within the United States
- Coordinates: 44°03′12″N 90°24′44″W
- Country: United States
- State: Wisconsin
- County: Monroe
- Elevation: 925 ft (282 m)
- Time zone: UTC-6 (Central (CST))
  - Summer (DST): UTC-5 (CDT)
- Area code: 608
- GNIS feature ID: 1576019

Valley Junction is an unincorporated community located in the Town of Byron in Monroe County, Wisconsin, United States. It is located at the intersection of Wisconsin Highway 173, Monroe County Trunk Highway G, and Monroe County Highway N.

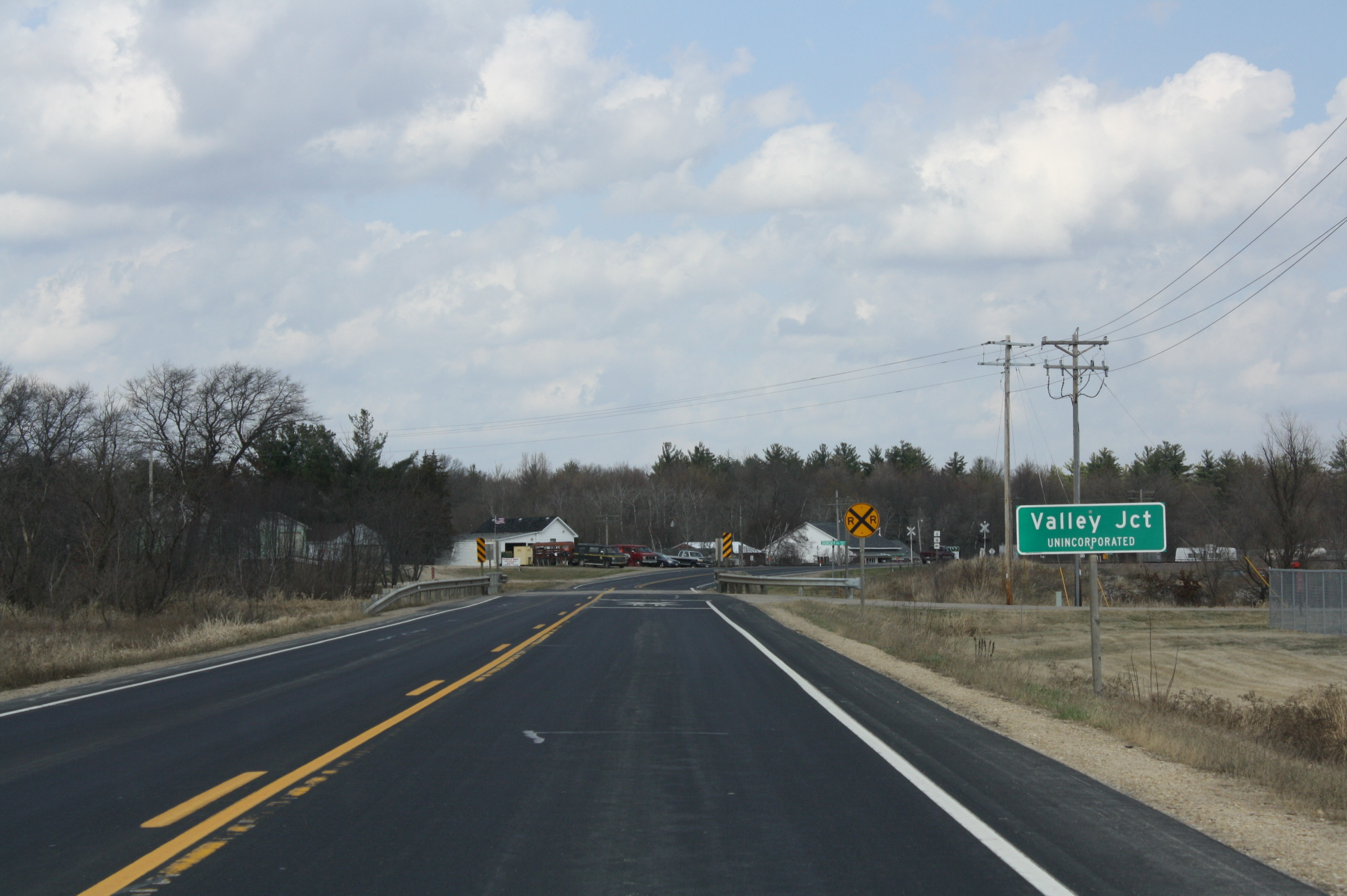
Looking north along Wisconsin Highway 173 at the community's border road sign, March 2012

== History ==
Valley Junction was named from its location in a valley at the junction of two roads. The post office had the name in 1900. Two railroads crossed in the center of town: the Chicago, St. Paul, Minneapolis and Omaha Railway and the Chicago, Milwaukee, and St. Paul Railway. They maintained a joint station. The Milwaukee branch line between Tomah and Babcock is gone. The Omaha line remains as the Union Pacific Railroad line between the Twin Cities and Milwaukee.
