= Remington, Wisconsin =

Town of Remington, Wisconsin
- Town
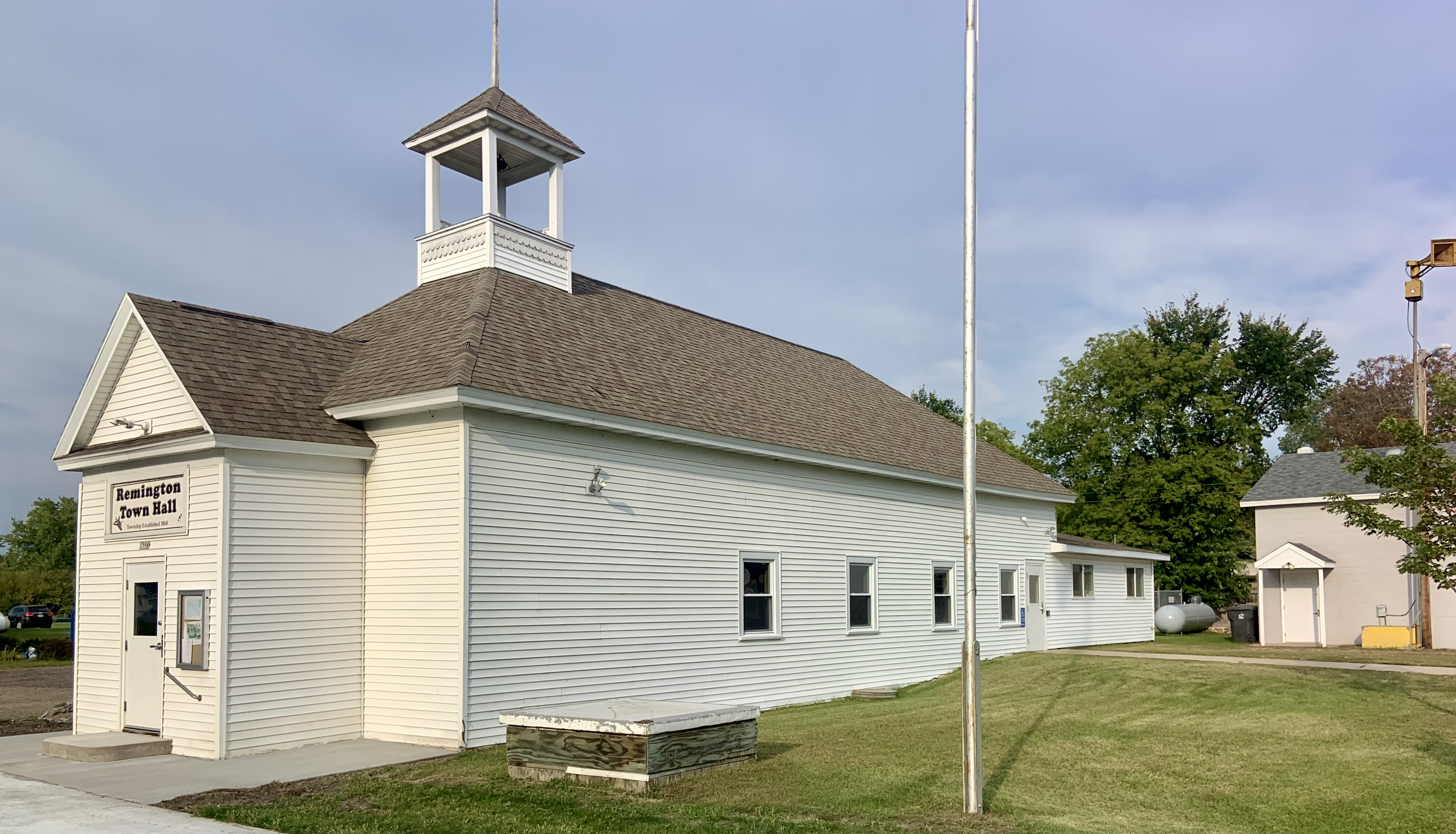
- Town hall in Babcock

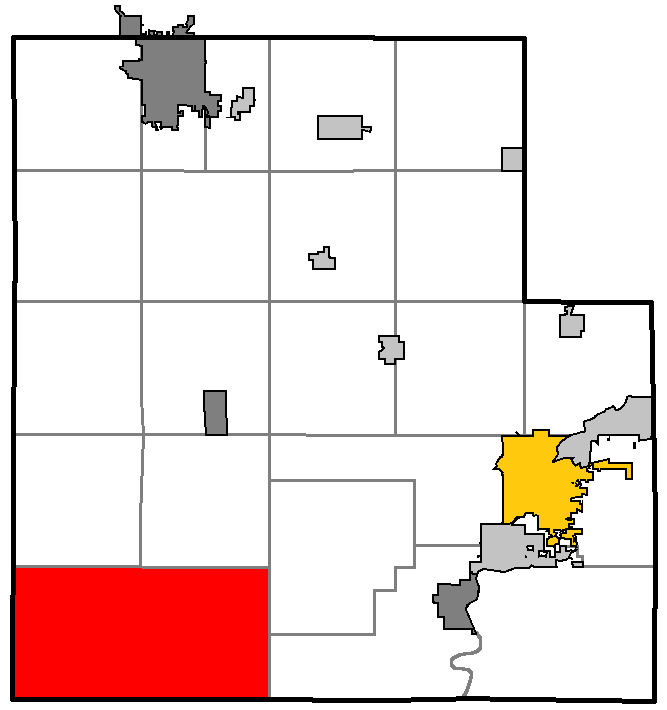
- Location of the Town of Remington, Wood County

- Location of Wood County, Wisconsin
- Coordinates: 44°18′4″N 90°9′48″W
- Country: United States
- State: Wisconsin
- County: Wood

Area
  - Total: 71.5 sq mi (185.3 km^{2})
  - Land: 69.3 sq mi (179.6 km^{2})
  - Water: 2.2 sq mi (5.6 km^{2})
- Elevation: 974 ft (297 m)

Population (2020)
  - Total: 230
  - Density: 3.3/sq mi (1.3/km^{2})
- Time zone: UTC-6 (Central (CST))
  - Summer (DST): UTC-5 (CDT)
- Area codes: 715 & 534
- FIPS code: 55-67000
- GNIS feature ID: 1584010
- PLSS township: T21N R2E and T21N R3E

The Town of Remington is located in Wood County, Wisconsin, United States. The population was 230 at the 2020 census. The unincorporated community of Babcock is located in the town.

== Geography ==
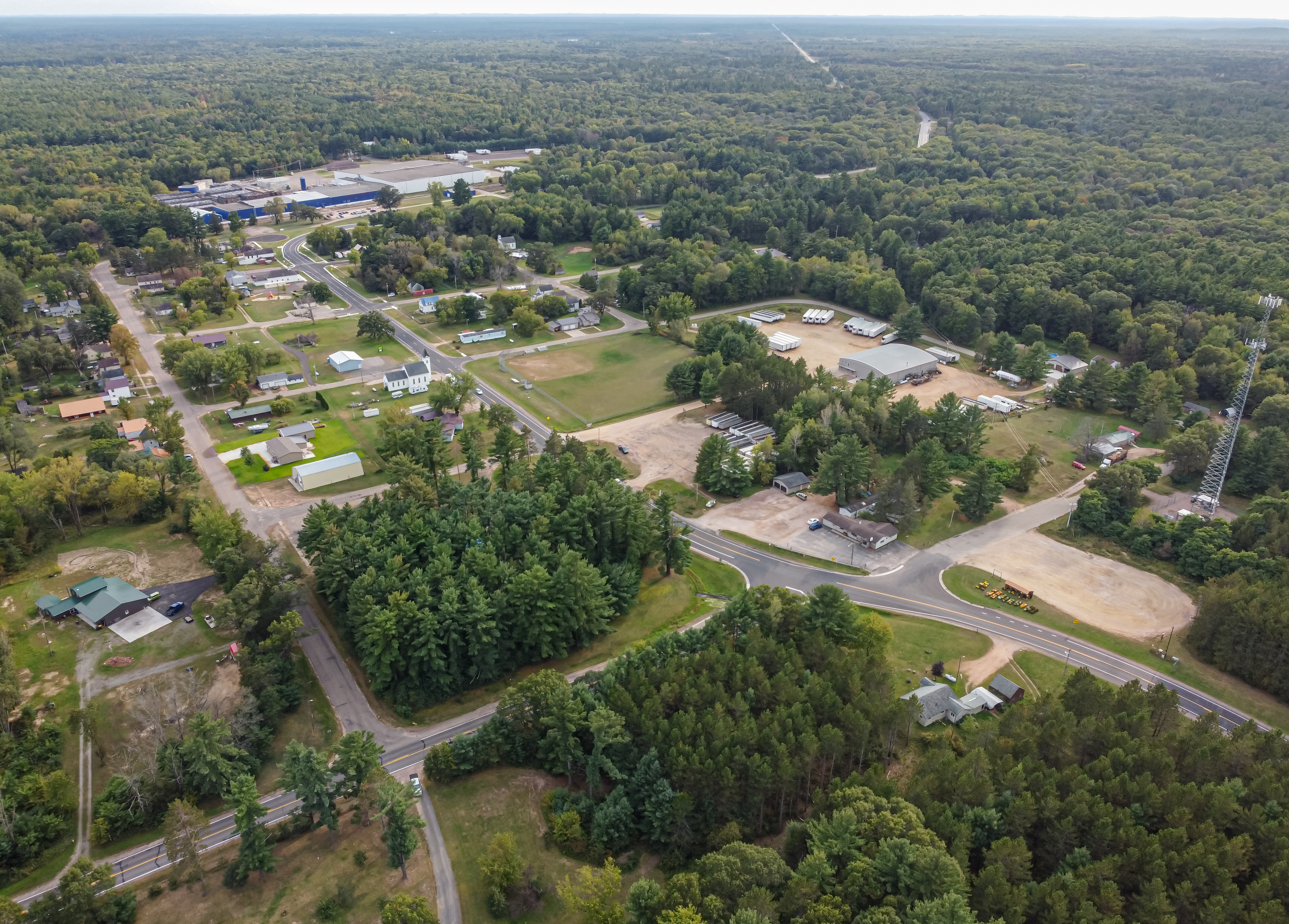
Babcock

The Town of Remington is a rectangle, 12 miles east to west by six miles north to south. According to the United States Census Bureau, the town has a total area of 71.5 square miles (185.3 km^{2}), of which 69.4 square miles (179.6 km^{2}) is land and 2.2 square miles (5.6 km^{2}) (3.05%) is water.

== History ==
In the spring of 1839 the southern side of the Town of Remington was walked by government surveyors as they measured their way east from the Fourth principal meridian, working their way over to the Wisconsin River, to survey the "Indian strip" along the river which was ceded by the Menominee to the U.S. government in the 1836 Treaty of the Cedars.

In the winter of 1851–1852 a crew working for the U.S. government surveyed all the section corners of the six mile square that would become the east half of the town, walking through the woods and probably crossing the marshes on the ice, measuring with chain and compass. When done, the deputy surveyor filed this general description of the east half of the town:

The surface of this Township is level, swamp excepting a narrow strip of land of about 40 Chains in width on either bank of the Yellow river which is gently(?) raised(?), and dry(?) being drained(?) by small Brooks leading from the swamps in the area(?) of River, South of Hemlock Creek, and East of Yellow River the principal part of the land is open Marsh. North of Hemlock Creek, and East of River low and Wet land and might be rendered fit for cultivation, by clearing off the Timber and very thick crop of underbrush. West of Yellow River the land is principally Tamarack swamp and no one section could be made cultivable without draining(?). Timber. North of Hemlock creek and West of Yellow River is principally 2d rate Pine & Tamarack. Stand(?) thick, underbrush, very thick with alders(?), small Pine and Witch-hazel. Wards Mill & improvements near center of Sec. 27.

In October 1852 another team of surveyors marked the section lines of the west half of what is now Remington, filing this description:

This Township is an entire marsh & Swamp. its whole surface with but verry little exception being under water. The Timber is smal Pine and Tamarac - Their is no Settlement or improvement of any description in this Town.

The Town of Remington was established in 1868, and named for the now-extinct community called Remington within the town's borders.

== Demographics ==
As of the census of 2000, there were 305 people, 125 households, and 83 families residing in the town. The population density was 4.4 people per square mile (1.7/km^{2}). There were 179 housing units at an average density of 2.6 per square mile (1.0/km^{2}). The racial makeup of the town was 95.08% White, 1.31% African American, 1.64% Native American, 0.33% Asian, and 1.64% from two or more races.

There were 125 households, out of which 24.8% had children under the age of 18 living with them, 56.0% were married couples living together, 7.2% had a female householder with no husband present, and 33.6% were non-families. 28.0% of all households were made up of individuals, and 10.4% had someone living alone who was 65 years of age or older. The average household size was 2.44 and the average family size was 2.99.

In the town, the population was spread out, with 23.0% under the age of 18, 6.9% from 18 to 24, 26.6% from 25 to 44, 26.6% from 45 to 64, and 17.0% who were 65 years of age or older. The median age was 41 years. For every 100 females, there were 102.0 males. For every 100 females age 18 and over, there were 106.1 males.

The median income for a household in the town was $37,188, and the median income for a family was $46,250. Males had a median income of $28,750 versus $21,458 for females. The per capita income for the town was $16,571. About 3.9% of families and 7.1% of the population were below the poverty line, including none of those under the age of eighteen and 24.4% of those 65 or over.

== See also ==
- List of towns in Wisconsin
