= Babcock, Wisconsin =

Census-designated place in Wisconsin, United States

- Census-designated place
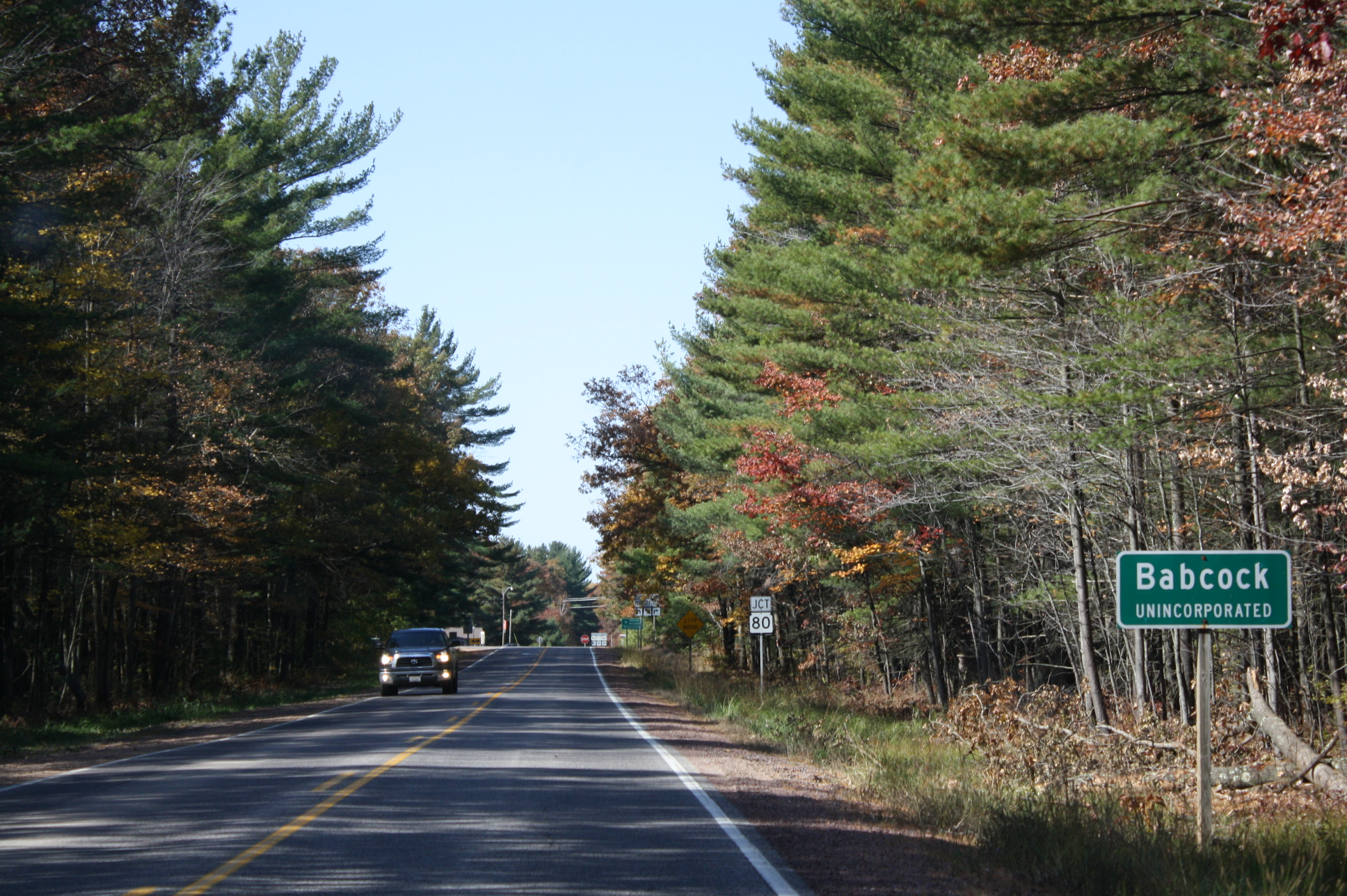
- Sign on WIS 173

- Location within Wisconsin
- Coordinates: 44°18′06″N 90°06′40″W
- Country: United States
- State: Wisconsin
- County: Wood

Area
  - Total: 3.101 sq mi (8.03 km^{2})
  - Land: 3.101 sq mi (8.03 km^{2})
  - Water: 0 sq mi (0 km^{2})
- Elevation: 974 ft (297 m)

Population (2020)
  - Total: 122
  - Density: 39.3/sq mi (15.2/km^{2})
- Time zone: UTC-6 (Central (CST))
  - Summer (DST): UTC-5 (CDT)
- ZIP code: 54413
- Area codes: 715 & 534
- GNIS feature ID: 1561050

Babcock is a census-designated place located in Wood County, Wisconsin, United States. Babcock is southwest of Wisconsin Rapids, in the town of Remington. Babcock has a post office with ZIP code 54413. As of the 2020 census, Babcock had a population of 122. Its motto is "Birds, Bogs, and Bucks." The community was named for Joseph W. Babcock, a sawmill operator who purchased the site and built a hotel and a depot.

Babcock was once an important junction on the Milwaukee Road, with lines running north, east, south, and southwest. Today, however, only a single track of the Canadian National runs south to Necedah and east to Port Edwards and Wisconsin Rapids.

== Images ==
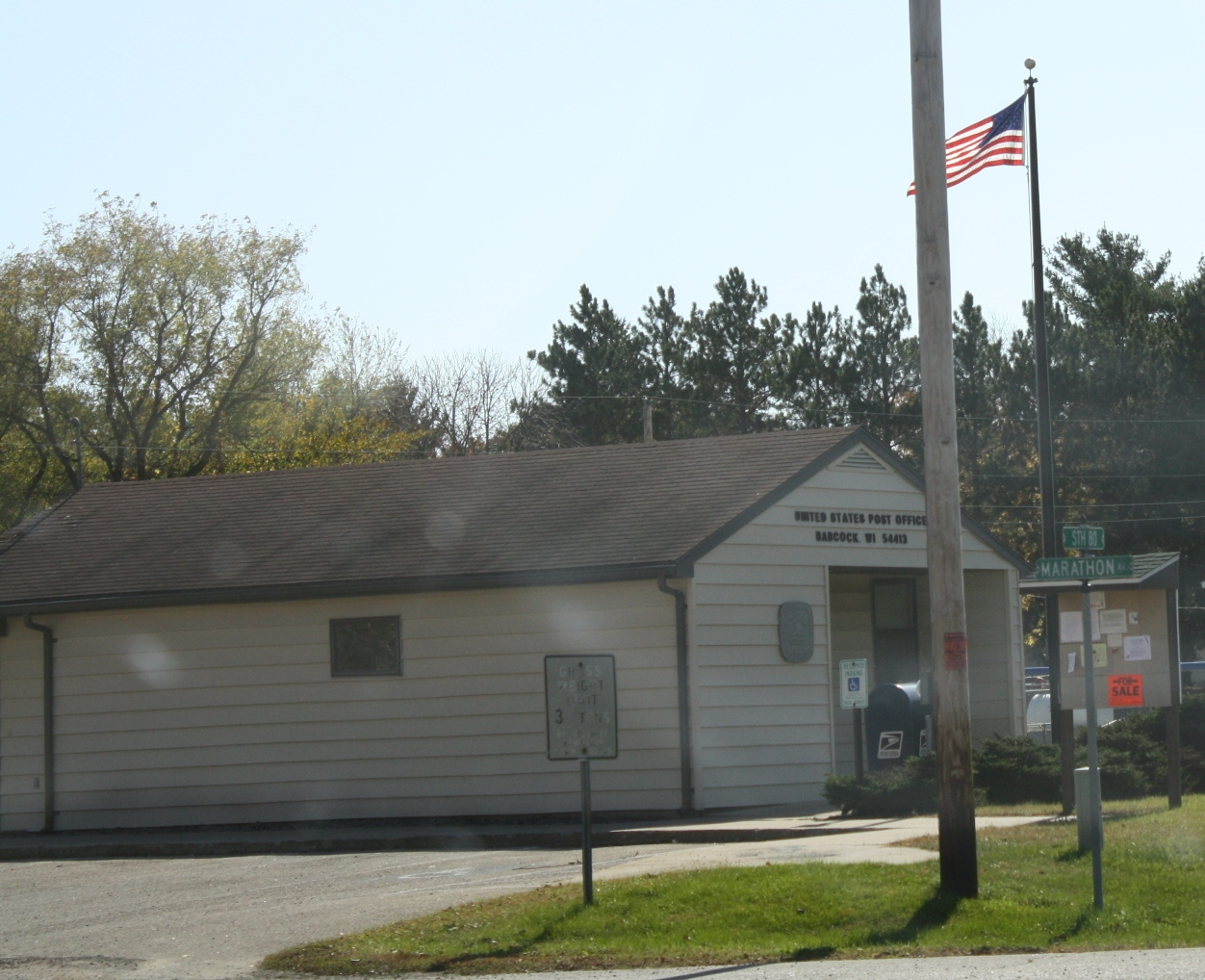
Post office

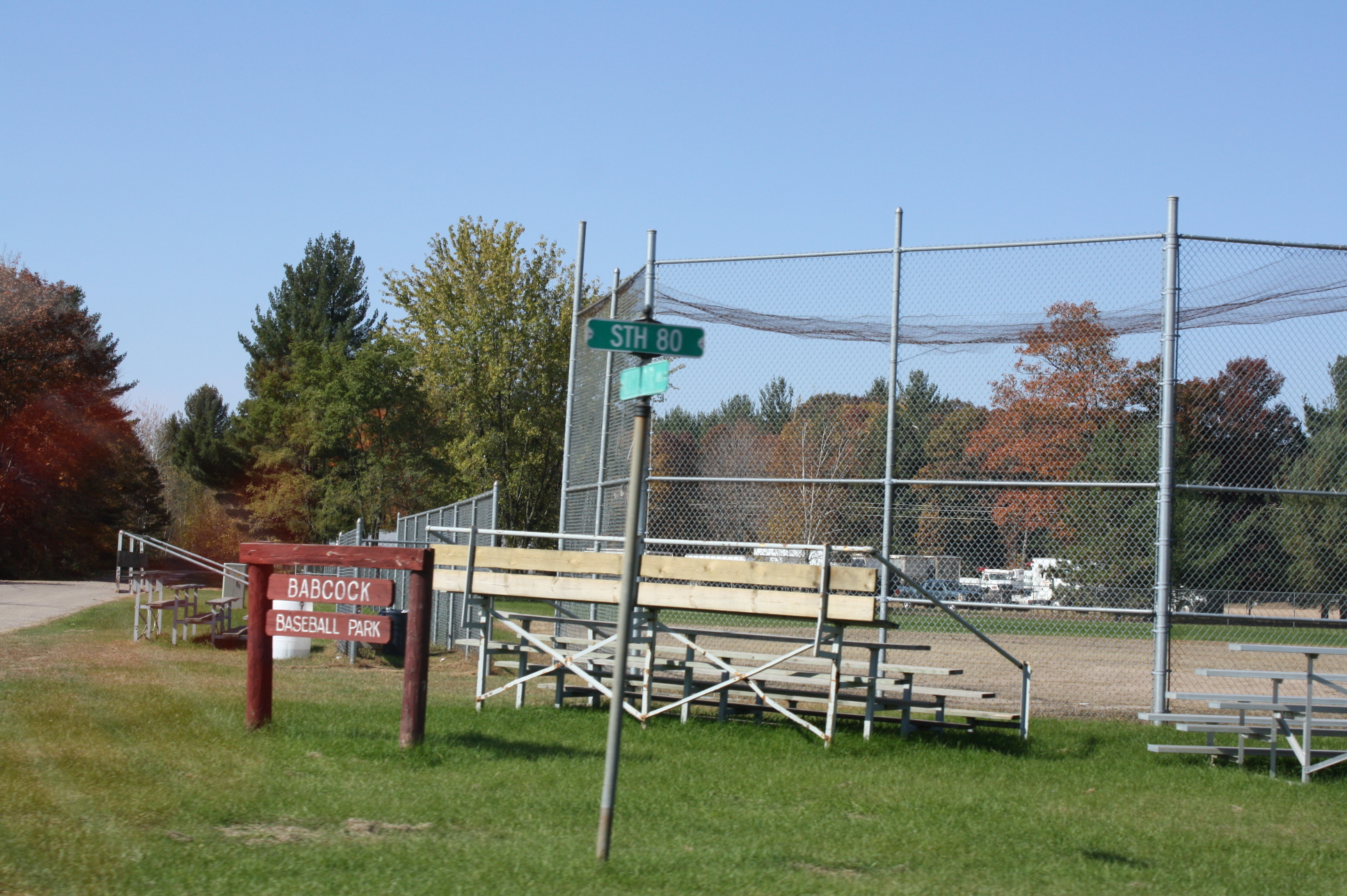
Baseball diamond

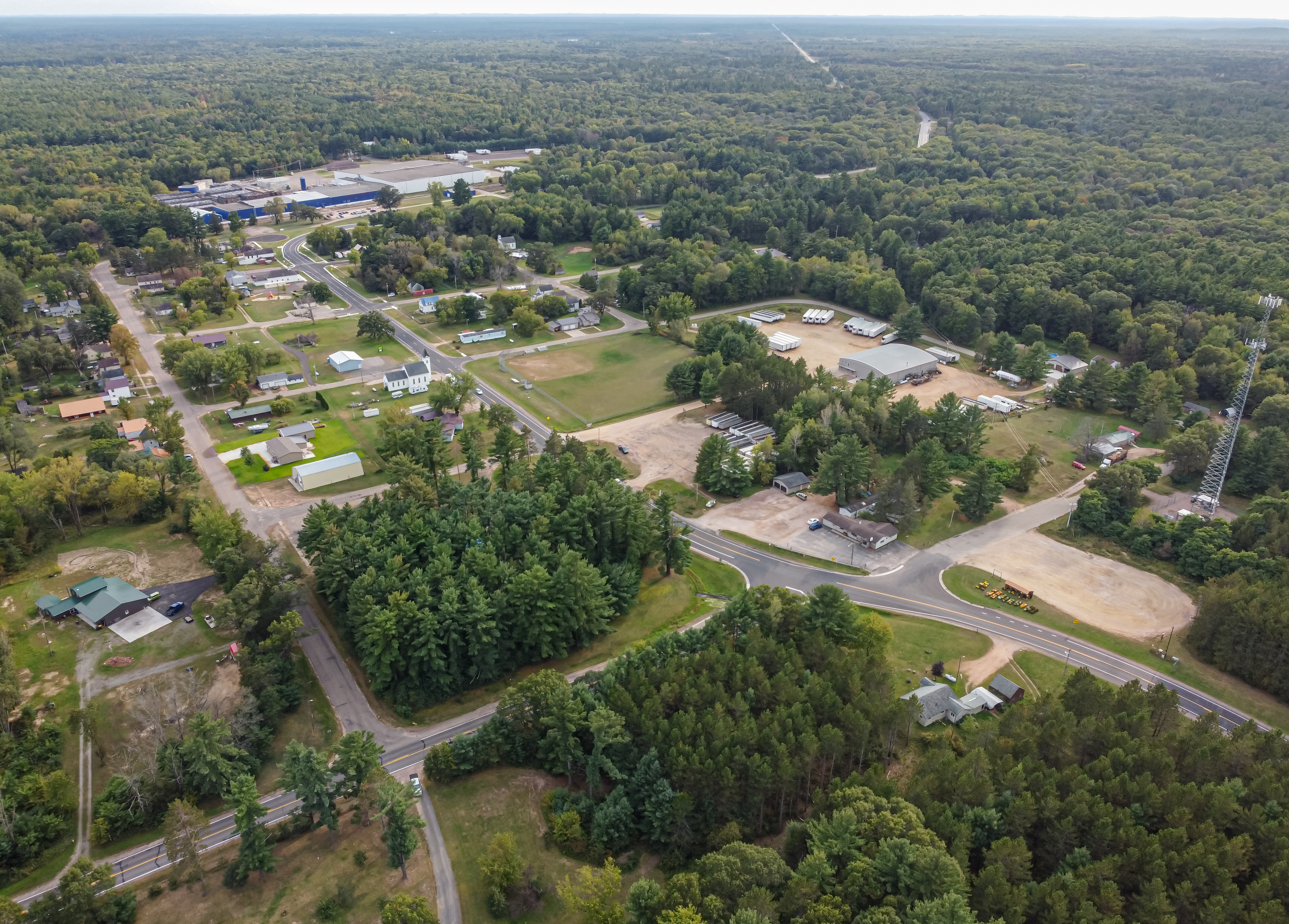
Wis-80 and Wis-173 junction in town

== See also ==
- List of census-designated places in Wisconsin
