= Kingston, Juneau County, Wisconsin =

Kingston, Wisconsin
- Town
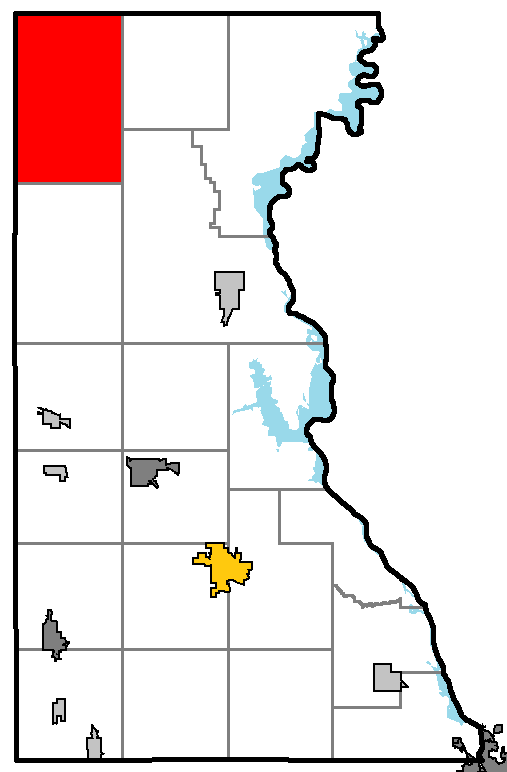
- Location of Kingston, Juneau County

- Location of Juneau County, Wisconsin
- Coordinates: 44°10′36″N 90°15′11″W
- Country: United States
- State: Wisconsin
- County: Juneau

Area
  - Total: 57.1 sq mi (147.8 km^{2})
  - Land: 54.6 sq mi (141.3 km^{2})
  - Water: 2.5 sq mi (6.5 km^{2})
- Elevation: 950 ft (290 m)

Population (2020)
  - Total: 57
  - Density: 1.0/sq mi (0.40/km^{2})
- Time zone: UTC-6 (Central (CST))
  - Summer (DST): UTC-5 (CDT)
- Area code: 608
- FIPS code: 55-39800
- GNIS feature ID: 1583485

Kingston is a town in Juneau County, Wisconsin, United States. Its population was 57 at the 2020 census. The unincorporated communities of Mather and Meadow Valley are located in the town.

== Geography ==
According to the United States Census Bureau, the town has a total area of 57.1 square miles (147.8 km^{2}), of which 54.6 square miles (141.3 km^{2}) is land and 2.5 square miles (6.5 km^{2}) (4.40%) is water.

== Demographics ==
As of the census of 2000, there were 58 people, 22 households, and 17 families residing in the town. The population density was 1.1 people per square mile (0.4/km^{2}). There were 32 housing units at an average density of 0.6 per square mile (0.2/km^{2}). The racial makeup of the town was 98.28% White and 1.72% Asian.

There were 22 households, out of which 27.3% had children under the age of 18 living with them, 72.7% were married couples living together, 4.5% had a female householder with no husband present, and 18.2% were non-families. 13.6% of all households were made up of individuals, and 4.5% had someone living alone who was 65 years of age or older. The average household size was 2.64 and the average family size was 2.89.

In the town, the population was spread out, with 25.9% under the age of 18, 5.2% from 18 to 24, 25.9% from 25 to 44, 31.0% from 45 to 64, and 12.1% who were 65 years of age or older. The median age was 38 years. For every 100 females, there were 132.0 males. For every 100 females age 18 and over, there were 104.8 males.

The median income for a household in the town was $33,125, and the median income for a family was $33,750. Males had a median income of $19,583 versus $16,875 for females. The per capita income for the town was $11,554. There were 8.3% of families and 7.7% of the population living below the poverty line, including no under eighteens and none of those over 64.

== See also ==
- List of towns in Wisconsin
