= North Bend =

North Bend may refer to:

== Places ==
Canada

- North Bend, British Columbia, Canada

United States

- North Bend, Nebraska
- North Bend, Ohio
- North Bend, Oregon
- North Bend, Washington
- North Bend, West Virginia
- North Bend, Wisconsin, a town
- North Bend (community), Wisconsin, an unincorporated community
- North Bend Rail Trail, West Virginia, US
- North Bend State Park, West Virginia, US
- North Bend Township, Starke County, Indiana
- North Bend (Oscar, Louisiana), listed on the National Register of Historic Places (NRHP) in Louisiana
- North Bend (Weyanoke, Virginia), NRHP-listed

== Other uses ==
- The North Bend, an album by Rafael Anton Irisarri, 2010
