= Curran, Wisconsin =

- Town
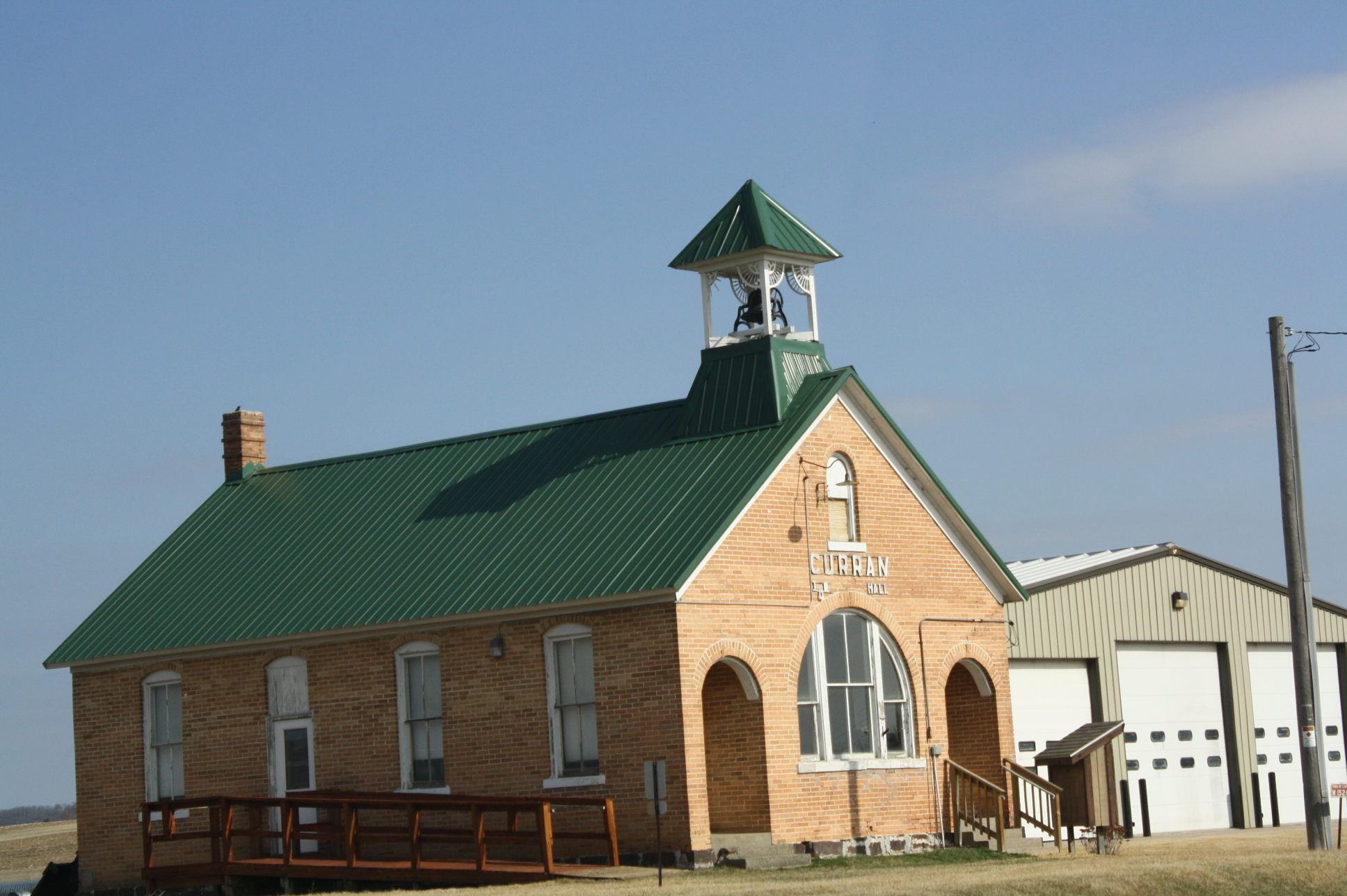
- Town hall on Wisconsin Highway 95

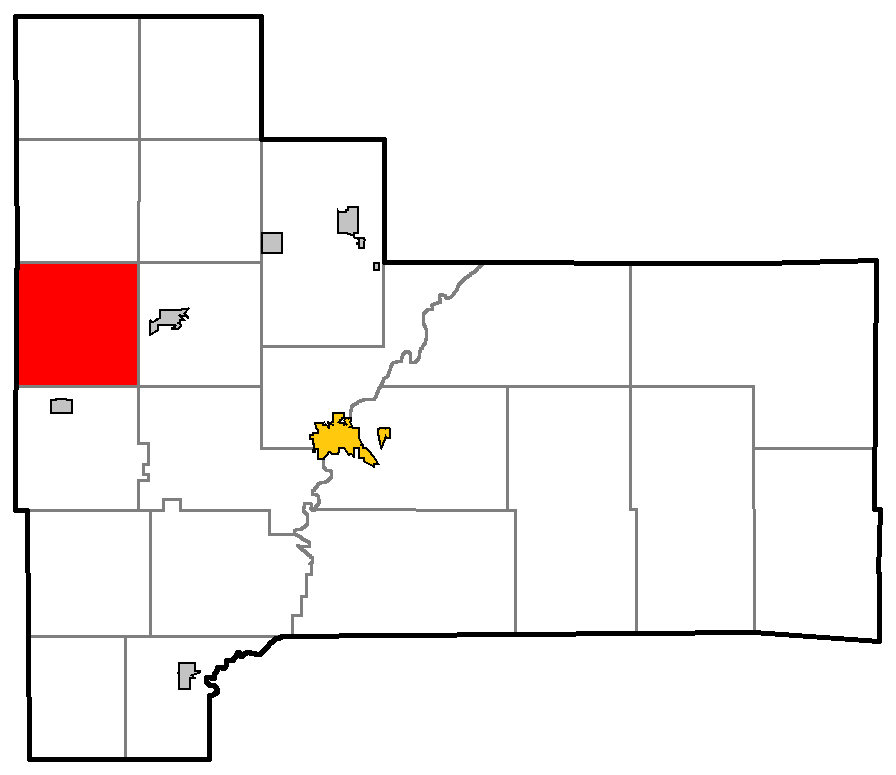
- Location of Curran, Jackson County

- Location of Jackson County, Wisconsin
- Coordinates: 44°23′6″N 91°5′6″W
- Country: United States
- State: Wisconsin
- County: Jackson

Area
  - Total: 36.2 sq mi (93.8 km^{2})
  - Land: 36.2 sq mi (93.8 km^{2})
  - Water: 0 sq mi (0.0 km^{2})
- Elevation: 932 ft (284 m)

Population (2020)
  - Total: 301
  - Density: 8.31/sq mi (3.21/km^{2})
- Time zone: UTC-6 (Central (CST))
  - Summer (DST): UTC-5 (CDT)
- FIPS code: 55-18075
- GNIS feature ID: 1583038

Curran is a town in Jackson County, Wisconsin, United States. The population was 301 at the 2020 census.

== History ==
On November 14, 1889, the town of Curran was created out of a portion of the town of Hixton. It is named for four brothers of the Curran family who owned land in the township.

== Geography ==
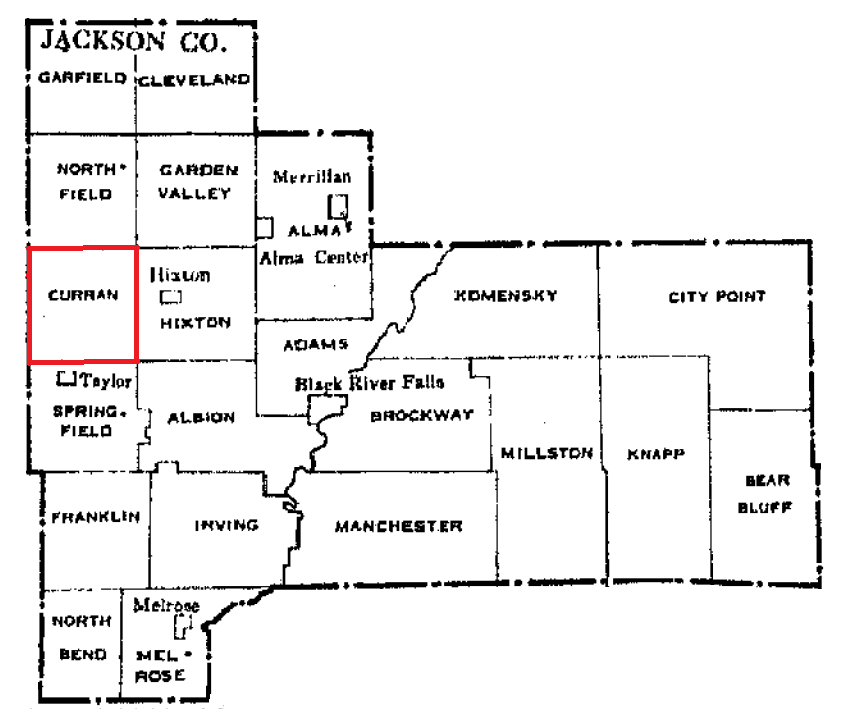
Location of Curran highlighted in red on map of Jackson County towns

According to the United States Census Bureau, the town has a total area of 36.2 square miles (93.8 km^{2}), all land. It is bordered on the north by the town of Northfield, on the east by the town of Hixton, on the south by Springfield, and on the west by Trempealeau County (primarily the town of Pigeon in that county, and a small portion of Preston to the southwest).

== Demographics ==
Historical population
Census	Pop.	Note	%±
1890	706		—
1900	706		0.0%
1910	650		−7.9%
1920	707		8.8%
1930	627		−11.3%
1940	543		−13.4%
1950	519		−4.4%
1960	423		−18.5%
1970	360		−14.9%
1980	410		13.9%
1990	351		−14.4%
2000	366		4.3%
2010	343		−6.3%
1990 1970-90; 1940-1960 1910-1930; 1890-1900 1890

As of the census of 2000, there were 366 people, 127 households, and 102 families residing in the town. The population density was 10.1 people per square mile (3.9/km^{2}). There were 171 housing units at an average density of 4.7 per square mile (1.8/km^{2}). The racial makeup of the town was 97.81% White and 2.19% Native American. Hispanic or Latino of any race were 1.37% of the population.

There were 127 households, out of which 38.6% had children under the age of 18 living with them, 73.2% were married couples living together, 3.9% had a female householder with no husband present, and 18.9% were non-families. 15.7% of all households were made up of individuals, and 7.1% had someone living alone who was 65 years of age or older. The average household size was 2.88 and the average family size was 3.19.

In the town, the population was spread out, with 30.9% under the age of 18, 6.0% from 18 to 24, 31.4% from 25 to 44, 19.4% from 45 to 64, and 12.3% who were 65 years of age or older. The median age was 36 years. For every 100 females, there were 119.2 males. For every 100 females age 18 and over, there were 114.4 males.

The median income for a household in the town was $41,750, and the median income for a family was $47,500. Males had a median income of $30,313 versus $19,063 for females. The per capita income for the town was $16,119. About 7.0% of families and 8.9% of the population were below the poverty line, including 4.8% of those under age 18 and 5.9% of those age 65 or over.
