= Knapp, Wisconsin =

Knapp is the name of some places in the U.S. state of Wisconsin:

- Knapp, Dunn County, Wisconsin, a village
- Knapp, Jackson County, Wisconsin, a town
