= Bear Bluff, Wisconsin =

- Town
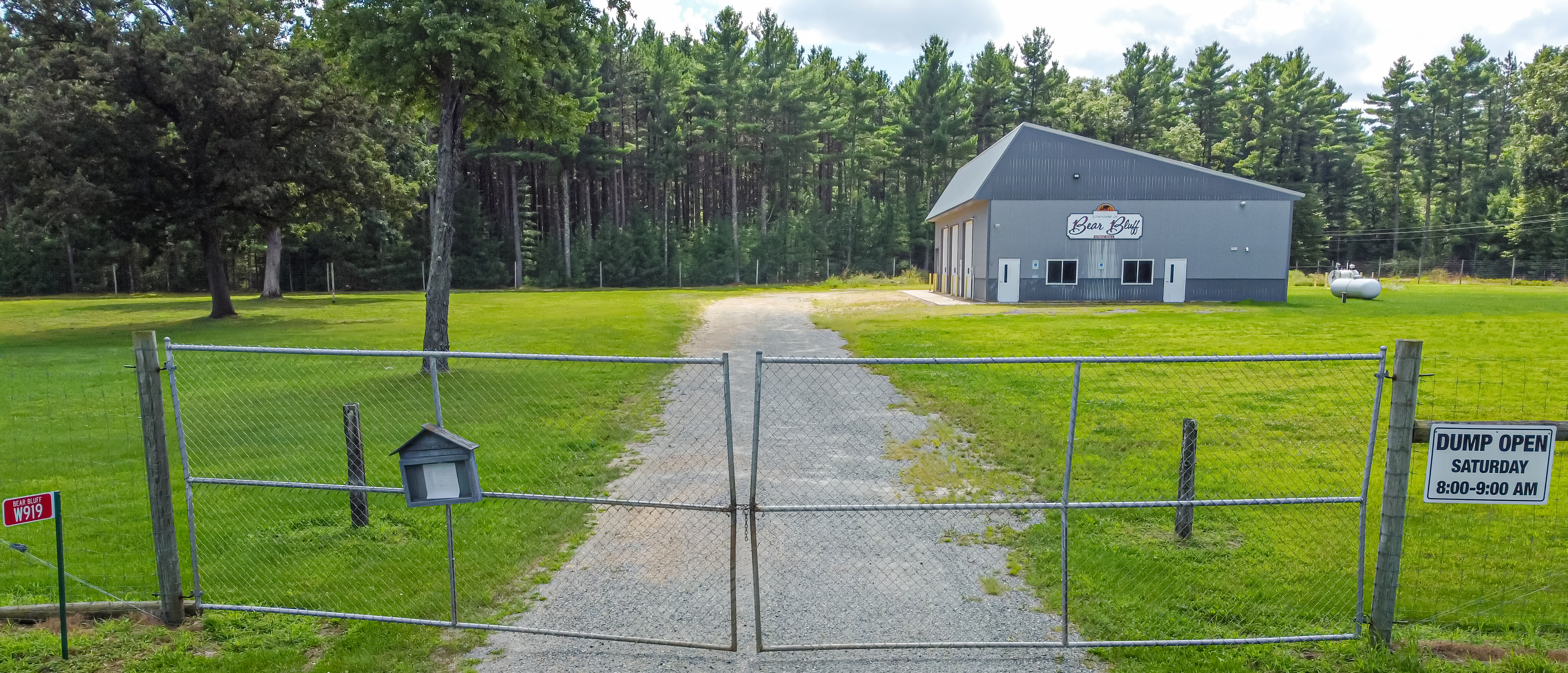
- Town hall

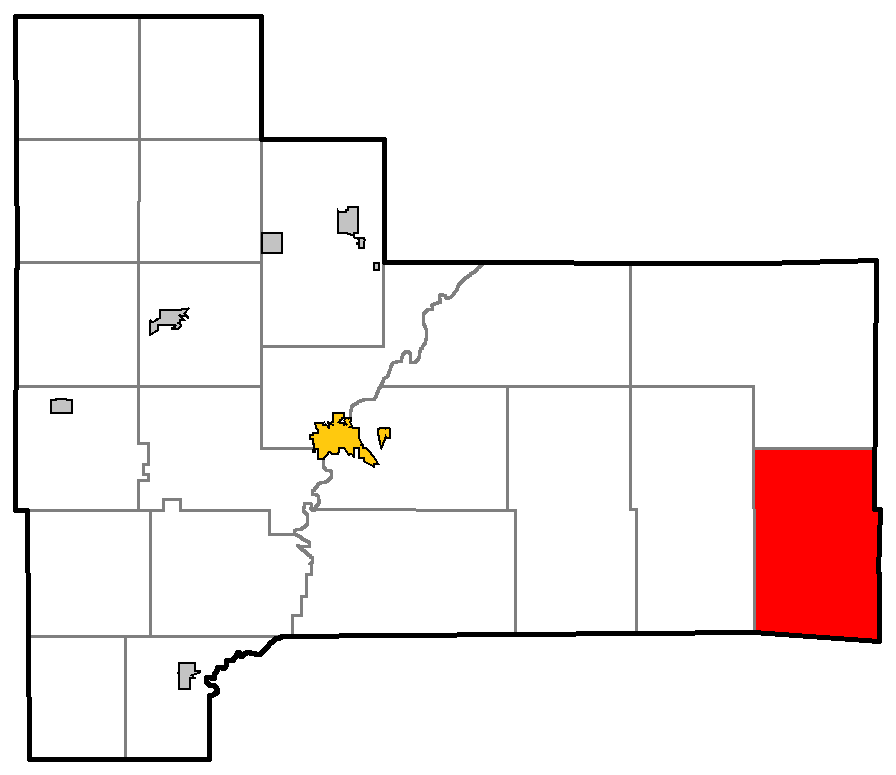
- Location of Bear Bluff, Jackson County

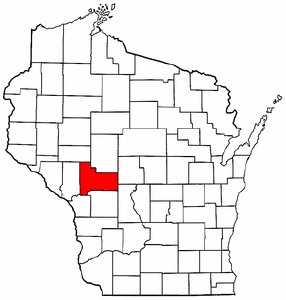
- Location of Jackson County, Wisconsin
- Coordinates: 44°11′52″N 90°22′41″W
- Country: United States
- State: Wisconsin
- County: Jackson

Area
  - Total: 56.1 sq mi (145.2 km^{2})
  - Land: 53.1 sq mi (137.4 km^{2})
  - Water: 3.0 sq mi (7.8 km^{2})
- Elevation: 981 ft (299 m)

Population (2020)
  - Total: 155
  - Density: 2.92/sq mi (1.13/km^{2})
- Time zone: UTC-6 (Central (CST))
  - Summer (DST): UTC-5 (CDT)
- FIPS code: 55-05550
- GNIS feature ID: 1582768
- Website: https://townofbearbluff.com/

Bear Bluff is a town in Jackson County, Wisconsin, United States. The population was 155 at the 2020 census.

== History ==
The town was formed in the 1890s from part of the town of City Point.

== Geography ==
According to the United States Census Bureau, the town has a total area of 56.1 square miles (145.2 km^{2}), of which 53.0 square miles (137.4 km^{2}) is land and 3.0 square miles (7.8 km^{2}) (5.39%) is water.

== Demographics ==
As of the census of 2000, there were 128 people, 49 households, and 34 families residing in the town. The population density was 2.4 people per square mile (0.9/km^{2}). There were 56 housing units at an average density of 1.1 per square mile (0.4/km^{2}). The racial makeup of the town was 95.31% White, 2.34% Native American, 0.78% from other races, and 1.56% from two or more races. Hispanic or Latino of any race were 0.78% of the population.

There were 49 households, out of which 36.7% had children under the age of 18 living with them, 61.2% were married couples living together, 4.1% had a female householder with no husband present, and 30.6% were non-families. 24.5% of all households were made up of individuals, and 4.1% had someone living alone who was 65 years of age or older. The average household size was 2.61 and the average family size was 3.15.

In the town, the population was spread out, with 32.0% under the age of 18, 7.0% from 18 to 24, 29.7% from 25 to 44, 21.9% from 45 to 64, and 9.4% who were 65 years of age or older. The median age was 34 years. For every 100 females, there were 106.5 males. For every 100 females age 18 and over, there were 117.5 males.

The median income for a household in the town was $35,156, and the median income for a family was $35,625. Males had a median income of $31,563 versus $12,500 for females. The per capita income for the town was $26,170. There were 13.9% of families and 21.4% of the population living below the poverty line, including 39.0% of under eighteens and none of those over 64.
