= Price, Jackson County, Wisconsin =

Price, Wisconsin
- Unincorporated community
- Location within Wisconsin Location within the United States
- Coordinates: 44°34′54″N 91°03′17″W
- Country: United States
- State: Wisconsin
- County: Jackson
- Town: Garfield
- Elevation: 1,086 ft (331 m)
- Time zone: UTC-6 (Central (CST))
  - Summer (DST): UTC-5 (CDT)
- Area codes: 715 & 534
- GNIS feature ID: 1571927

Price is an unincorporated community located in the town of Garfield, Jackson County, Wisconsin, United States. Price is located along U.S. Route 10, 5 miles (8.0 km) west-southwest of Fairchild.

== History ==
A post office called Price was established in 1888, and remained in operation until it was discontinued in 1905. The community was named for William T. Price, a U.S. Representative from Wisconsin.
