= Requa, Wisconsin =

- Unincorporated community
- Location within Wisconsin Location within the United States
- Coordinates: 44°35′12″N 91°08′42″W
- Country: United States
- State: Wisconsin
- County: Jackson
- Town: Garfield
- Elevation: 1,020 ft (310 m)
- Time zone: UTC-6 (Central (CST))
  - Summer (DST): UTC-5 (CDT)
- Area codes: 715 & 534
- GNIS feature ID: 1572202

Requa is an unincorporated community located in the town of Garfield, Jackson County, Wisconsin, United States. Requa is located along U.S. Route 10 and the North Buffalo River, 3.5 miles (5.6 km) east of Osseo.

The name Requa is supposedly derived from a place in Norway.
