= Sechlerville, Wisconsin =

- Unincorporated community
- Location within Wisconsin Location within the United States
- Coordinates: 44°22′22″N 91°01′52″W
- Country: United States
- State: Wisconsin
- County: Jackson
- Town: Hixton
- Elevation: 928 ft (283 m)
- Time zone: UTC-6 (Central (CST))
  - Summer (DST): UTC-5 (CDT)
- Area codes: 715 & 534
- GNIS feature ID: 1573868

Sechlerville is an unincorporated community located in the town of Hixton, Jackson County, Wisconsin, United States.

The community is named after Jacob R. Sechler, who moved to the area in 1855. It once had a local post office which closed in the 1950s.
