= Pray, Wisconsin =

- Unincorporated community
- Location within Wisconsin Location within the United States
- Coordinates: 44°22′24″N 90°29′50″W
- Country: United States
- State: Wisconsin
- County: Jackson
- Town: City Point
- Elevation: 981 ft (299 m)
- Time zone: UTC-6 (Central (CST))
  - Summer (DST): UTC-5 (CDT)
- Area codes: 715 & 534
- GNIS feature ID: 1571909

Pray is an unincorporated community located in the town of City Point, Jackson County, Wisconsin, United States.

The community is named after Herman H. Pray (b. 1835). In 1877, Pray was appointed the local postmaster, and the office was named after him.

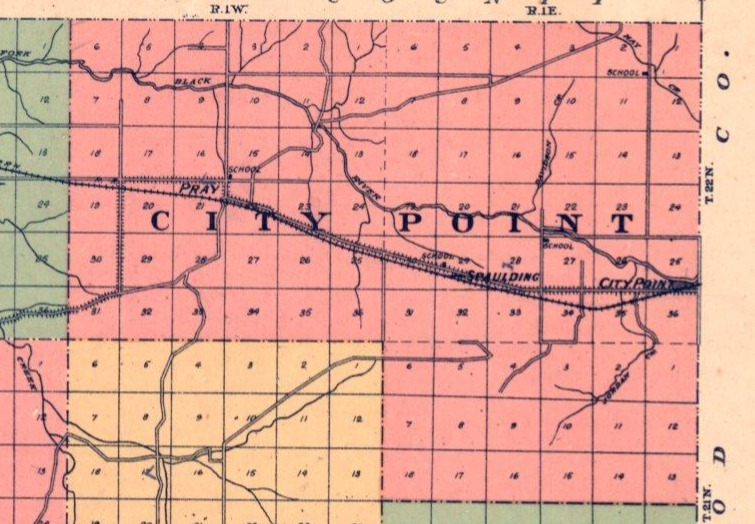
1914 map of town of City Point, showing locations of communities of City Point, Pray, and Spaulding.

The community is centered on the intersection of Pray Road and Old Highway 54 along the Green Bay and Western Railroad line, where it used to be a train stop. The community is located east of Waterbury and west of Spaulding along the rail line (also former rail stops), and about 2.5 miles north of the current alignment of Wisconsin Highway 54, which was completed in 1953.
