= Spaulding, Wisconsin =

- Unincorporated community
- Location within Wisconsin Location within the United States
- Coordinates: 44°21′21″N 90°24′56″W
- Country: United States
- State: Wisconsin
- County: Jackson
- Town: City Point
- Elevation: 971 ft (296 m)
- Time zone: UTC-6 (Central (CST))
  - Summer (DST): UTC-5 (CDT)
- Area codes: 715 & 534
- GNIS feature ID: 1574517

Spaulding is an unincorporated community in the town of City Point, Jackson County, Wisconsin, United States.

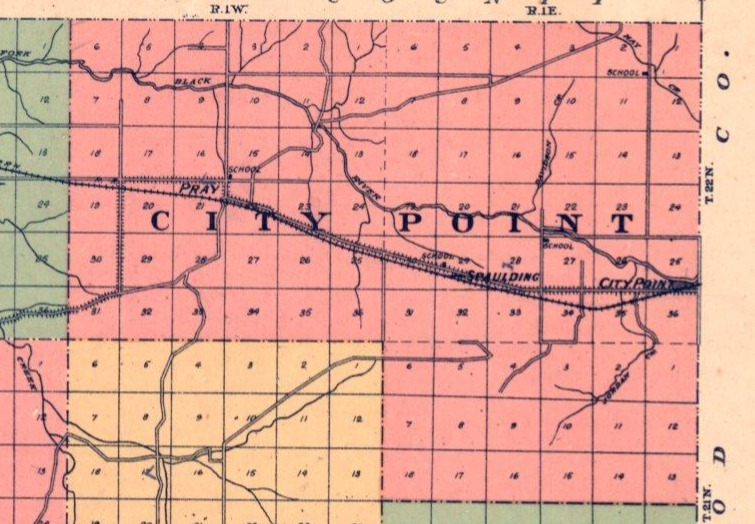
1914 map of town of City Point, showing locations of communities of City Point, Pray, and Spaulding.
