= Buckholz Corners, Wisconsin =

- Unincorporated community
- Location within Wisconsin Location within the United States
- Coordinates: 44°08′38″N 91°07′36″W
- Country: United States
- State: Wisconsin
- County: Jackson
- Town: North Bend
- Elevation: 879 ft (268 m)
- Time zone: UTC-6 (Central (CST))
  - Summer (DST): UTC-5 (CDT)
- Area codes: 715 & 534
- GNIS feature ID: 1562332

Buckholz Corners is an unincorporated community located in the town of North Bend, Jackson County, Wisconsin, United States. The community was named for Christopher Buckholz, the site owner, who emigrated from Prussia in the 1850s.
