= City Point, Wisconsin =

- Town
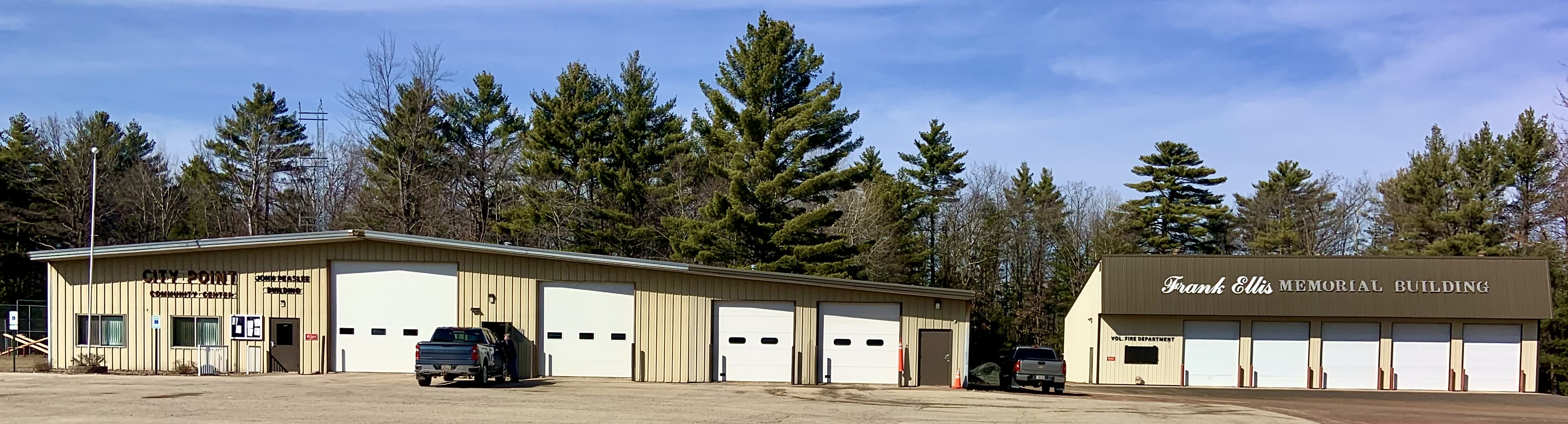
- Town hall

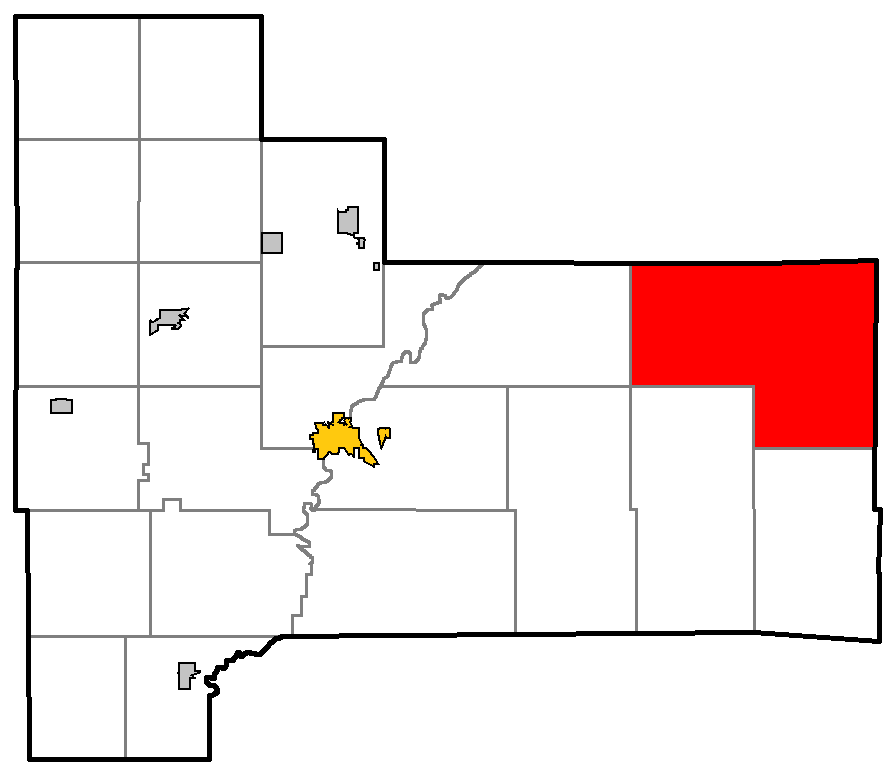
- Location of City Point, Jackson County

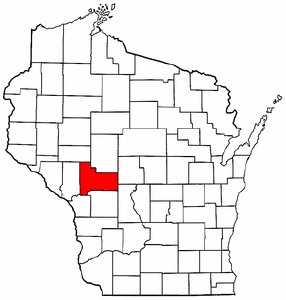
- Coordinates: 44°21′45″N 90°24′14″W
- Country: United States
- State: Wisconsin
- County: Jackson

Area
  - Total: 90.2 sq mi (233.7 km^{2})
  - Land: 89.1 sq mi (230.8 km^{2})
  - Water: 1.1 sq mi (2.9 km^{2})
- Elevation: 958 ft (292 m)

Population (2020)
  - Total: 177
  - Density: 1.99/sq mi (0.767/km^{2})
- Time zone: UTC-6 (Central (CST))
  - Summer (DST): UTC-5 (CDT)
- FIPS code: 55-14800
- GNIS feature ID: 1582962
- Website: https://townofcitypoint.com/

City Point is a town in Jackson County, Wisconsin, United States. The population was 177 at the 2020 census. The unincorporated communities of City Point, Pray, and Spaulding are located in the town.

== History ==
The town of City Point occupies the northeast corner of Jackson County. It was originally named the town of Sullivan, which had been formed in 1879 from portions of the towns of Manchester and Albion, and named after local resident John L. Sullivan (1849–1902). It was renamed the town of City Point in November 1889. The town of Bear Bluff was created out of the town of City Point in 1894.

== Geography ==
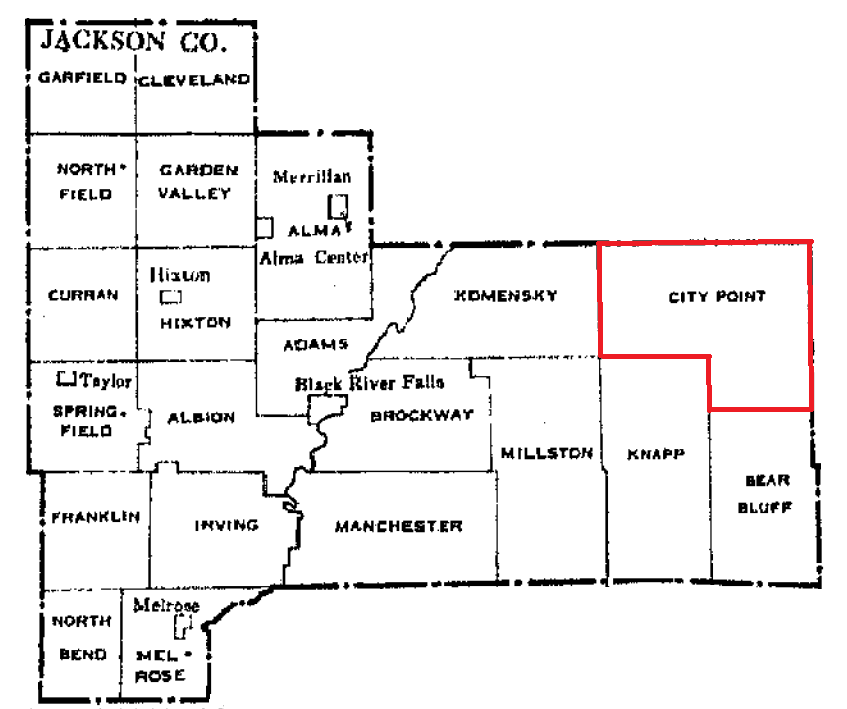
Location of City Point highlighted in red on map of Jackson County towns

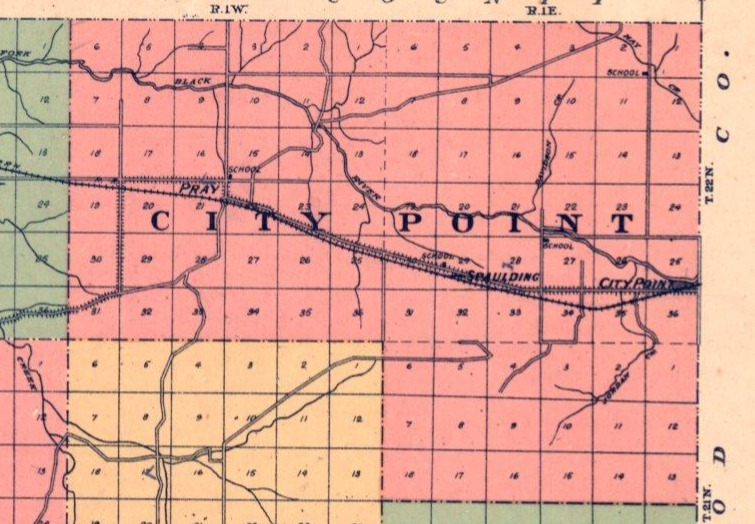
1914 map of town of City Point, showing locations of communities of City Point, Pray, and Spaulding.

According to the United States Census Bureau, the town has a total area of 90.2 square miles (233.7 km^{2}), of which 89.1 square miles (230.8 km^{2}) is land and 1.1 square miles (3.0 km^{2}) (1.26%) is water.

== Demographics ==
Historical population
Census	Pop.	Note	%±
1890	329		—
1900	323		−1.8%
1910	333		3.1%
1920	412		23.7%
1930	368		−10.7%
1940	350		−4.9%
1950	272		−22.3%
1960	222		−18.4%
1970	180		−18.9%
1980	196		8.9%
1990	193		−1.5%
2000	189		−2.1%
2010	182		−3.7%
U.S. Decennial Censuses

As of the census of 2000, there were 189 people, 83 households, and 54 families residing in the town. The population density was 2.1 people per square mile (0.8/km^{2}). There were 104 housing units at an average density of 1.2 per square mile (0.5/km^{2}). The racial makeup of the town was 96.30% White, 0.53% African American, 1.59% Native American, 0.53% from other races, and 1.06% from two or more races. Hispanic or Latino of any race were 1.59% of the population.

There were 83 households, out of which 16.9% had children under the age of 18 living with them, 60.2% were married couples living together, 2.4% had a female householder with no husband present, and 34.9% were non-families. 30.1% of all households were made up of individuals, and 18.1% had someone living alone who was 65 years of age or older. The average household size was 2.28 and the average family size was 2.83.

In the town, the population was spread out, with 18.0% under the age of 18, 6.3% from 18 to 24, 25.4% from 25 to 44, 28.6% from 45 to 64, and 21.7% who were 65 years of age or older. The median age was 46 years. For every 100 females, there were 96.9 males. For every 100 females age 18 and over, there were 106.7 males.

The median income for a household in the town was $33,750, and the median income for a family was $46,071. Males had a median income of $32,500 versus $25,625 for females. The per capita income for the town was $16,911. None of the families and 6.9% of the population were living below the poverty line, including no under eighteens and 15.2% of those over 64.
