= Garfield, Jackson County, Wisconsin =

Garfield, Wisconsin
- Town
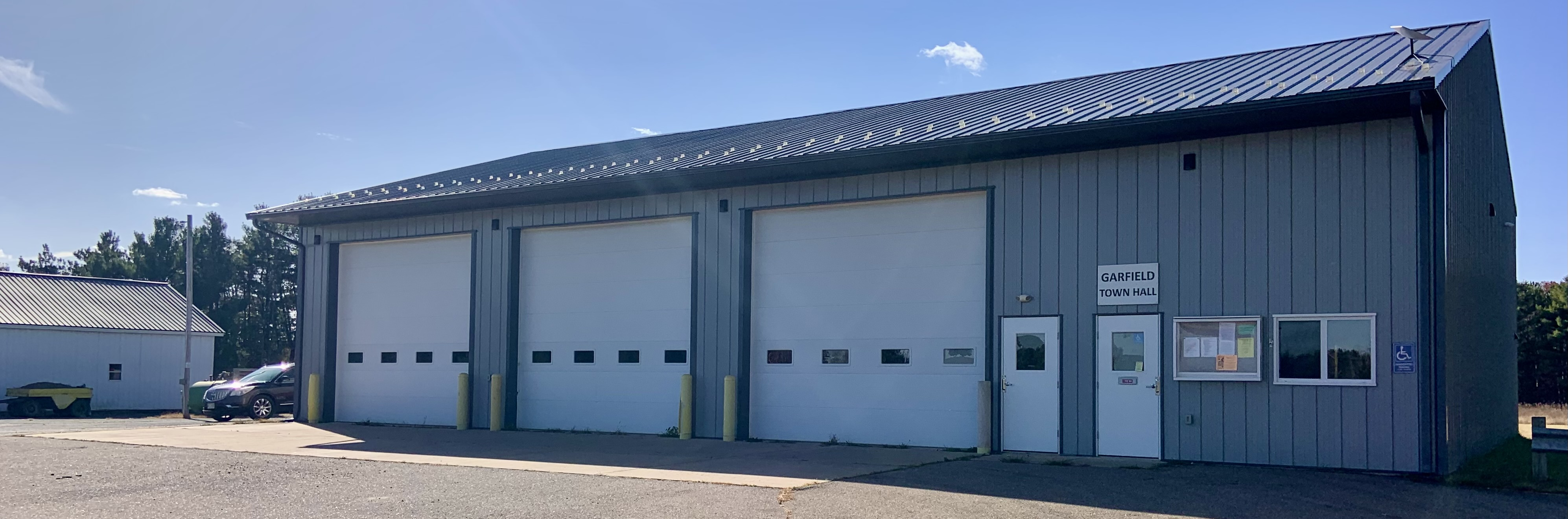
- Town hall in Levis

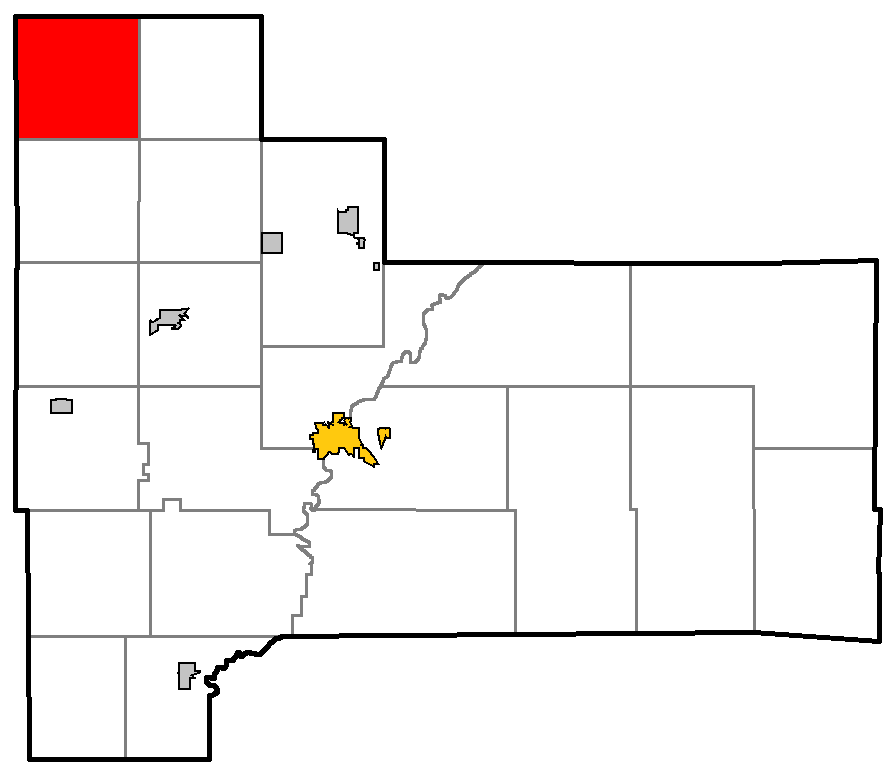
- Location of Garfield, Jackson County

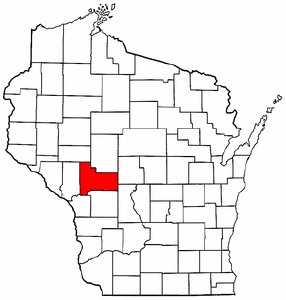
- Location of Jackson County, Wisconsin
- Coordinates: 44°33′19″N 91°6′50″W
- Country: United States
- State: Wisconsin
- County: Jackson

Area
  - Total: 35.9 sq mi (93.1 km^{2})
  - Land: 35.9 sq mi (93.1 km^{2})
  - Water: 0 sq mi (0.0 km^{2})
- Elevation: 1,040 ft (317 m)

Population (2020)
  - Total: 756
  - Density: 21.0/sq mi (8.12/km^{2})
- Time zone: UTC-6 (Central (CST))
  - Summer (DST): UTC-5 (CDT)
- FIPS code: 55-28325
- GNIS feature ID: 1583257
- Website: http://www.townofgarfieldwi.com

Garfield is a town in Jackson County, Wisconsin, United States. The population was 756 at the 2020 census. The unincorporated communities of Levis, Price and Requa are located in the town.

== History ==
Garfield is located in the northwestern corner of Jackson County. It was created in 1881 out of the northern portion of the town of Northfield.

== Geography ==
According to the United States Census Bureau, the town has a total area of 36.0 square miles (93.1 km^{2}), of which 36.0 square miles (93.1 km^{2}) is land and 0.03% is water.

== Demographics ==
Historical population
Census	Pop.	Note	%±
1890	502		—
1900	775		54.4%
1910	714		−7.9%
1920	715		0.1%
1930	611		−14.5%
1940	524		−14.2%
1950	443		−15.5%
1960	361		−18.5%
1970	369		2.2%
1980	423		14.6%
1990	421		−0.5%
2000	529		25.7%
2010	638		20.6%
1990 1970-90; 1940-1960 1910-1930; 1890-1900 1890

As of the census of 2000, there were 529 people, 180 households, and 131 families residing in the town. The population density was 14.7 people per square mile (5.7/km^{2}). There were 208 housing units at an average density of 5.8 per square mile (2.2/km^{2}). The racial makeup of the town was 89.41% White, 0.19% African American, 2.27% Native American, 6.99% from other races, and 1.13% from two or more races. Hispanic or Latino of any race were 10.96% of the population.

There were 180 households, out of which 36.7% had children under the age of 18 living with them, 63.9% were married couples living together, 6.1% had a female householder with no husband present, and 26.7% were non-families. 16.1% of all households were made up of individuals, and 3.3% had someone living alone who was 65 years of age or older. The average household size was 2.75 and the average family size was 3.16.

In the town, the population was spread out, with 26.7% under the age of 18, 8.5% from 18 to 24, 34.4% from 25 to 44, 23.3% from 45 to 64, and 7.2% who were 65 years of age or older. The median age was 36 years. For every 100 females, there were 118.6 males. For every 100 females age 18 and over, there were 132.3 males.

The median income for a household in the town was $43,125, and the median income for a family was $49,286. Males had a median income of $35,417 versus $22,083 for females. The per capita income for the town was $16,869. About 7.4% of families and 9.9% of the population were below the poverty line, including 17.9% of those under age 18 and 11.4% of those age 65 or over.
