= Millston (CDP), Wisconsin =

Census-designated place in Wisconsin, United States

Millston, Wisconsin
- Census-designated place
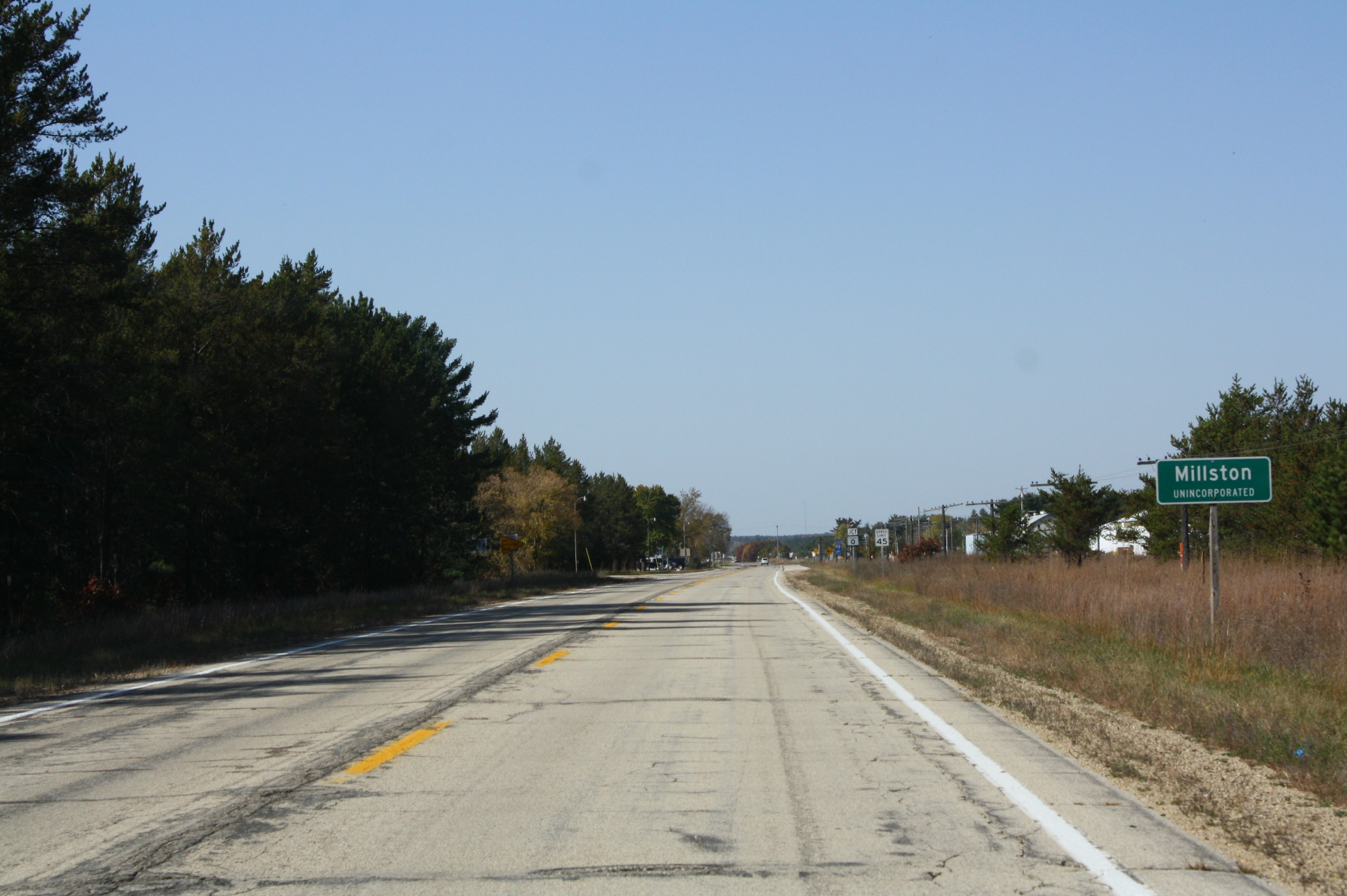
- Sign for Millston on US 12

- Location within Wisconsin Location within the United States
- Coordinates: 44°11′35″N 90°38′51″W
- Country: United States
- State: Wisconsin
- County: Jackson
- Town: Millston

Area
  - Total: 1.102 sq mi (2.85 km^{2})
  - Land: 1.041 sq mi (2.70 km^{2})
  - Water: 0.061 sq mi (0.16 km^{2})
- Elevation: 912 ft (278 m)

Population (2010)
  - Total: 125
  - Density: 120/sq mi (46.4/km^{2})
- Time zone: UTC-6 (Central (CST))
  - Summer (DST): UTC-5 (CDT)
- Area codes: 715 & 534
- GNIS feature ID: 1569526

Millston is an unincorporated census-designated place located in the town of Millston, Jackson County, Wisconsin, United States. Millston is located along U.S. Route 12 and Interstate 94, 12.5 miles (20.1 km) southeast of Black River Falls. As of the 2010 census, its population is 125. Millston is surrounded by the Black River State Forest.

== History ==
Millston was founded in 1870 by H. B. Mills, and named for him. A post office called Millston has been in operation since 1874.

== Images ==
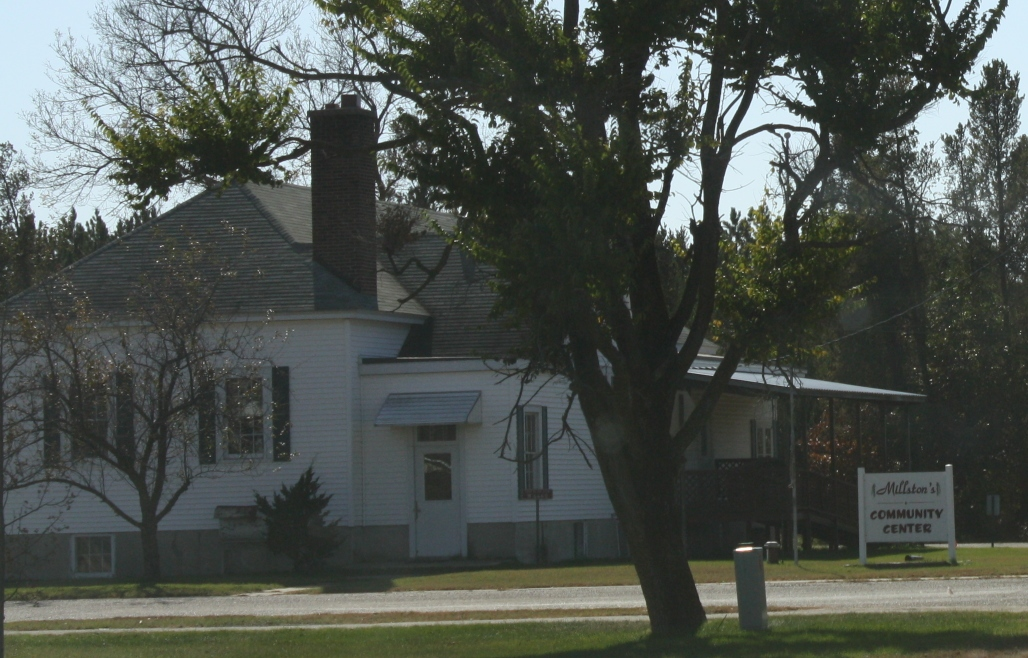
Millston Community Center

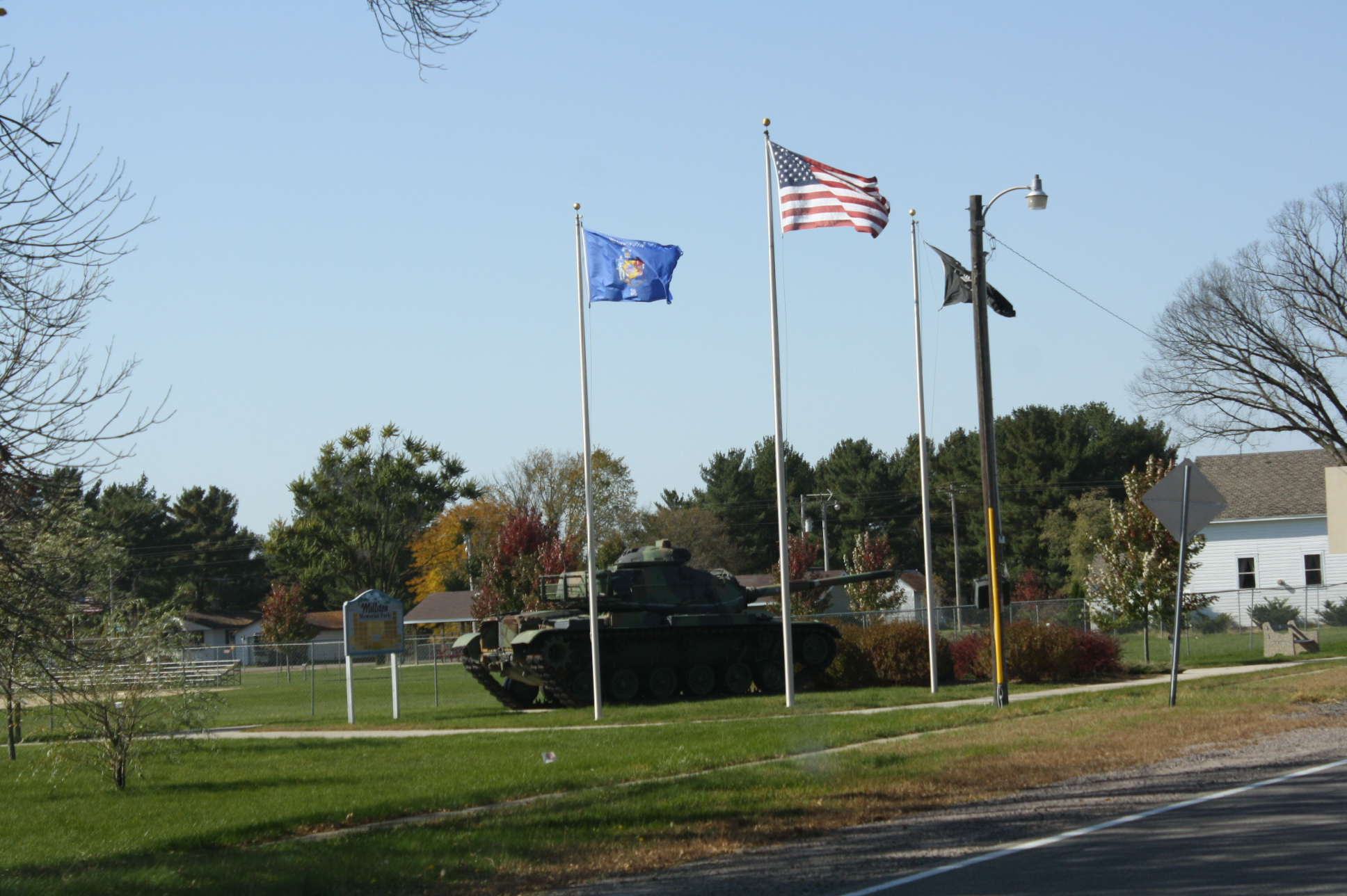
Millston Memorial Park

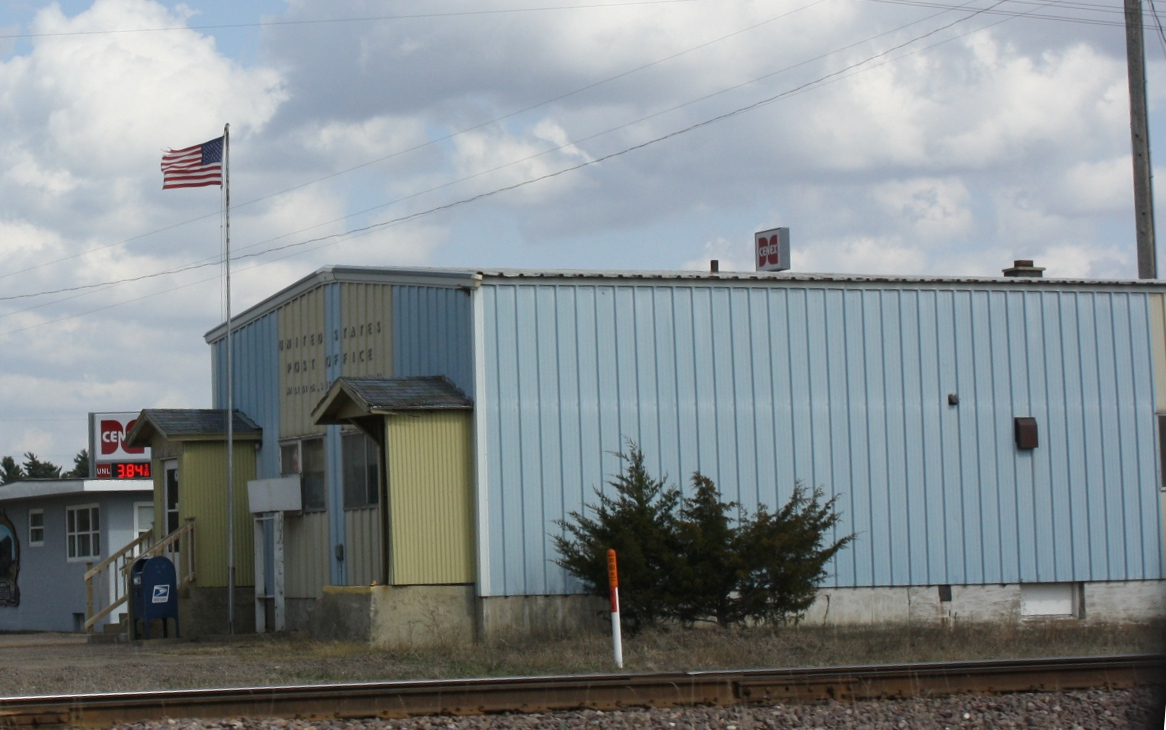
Post office
