= Jackson County, Wisconsin =

County in Wisconsin, United States

- County
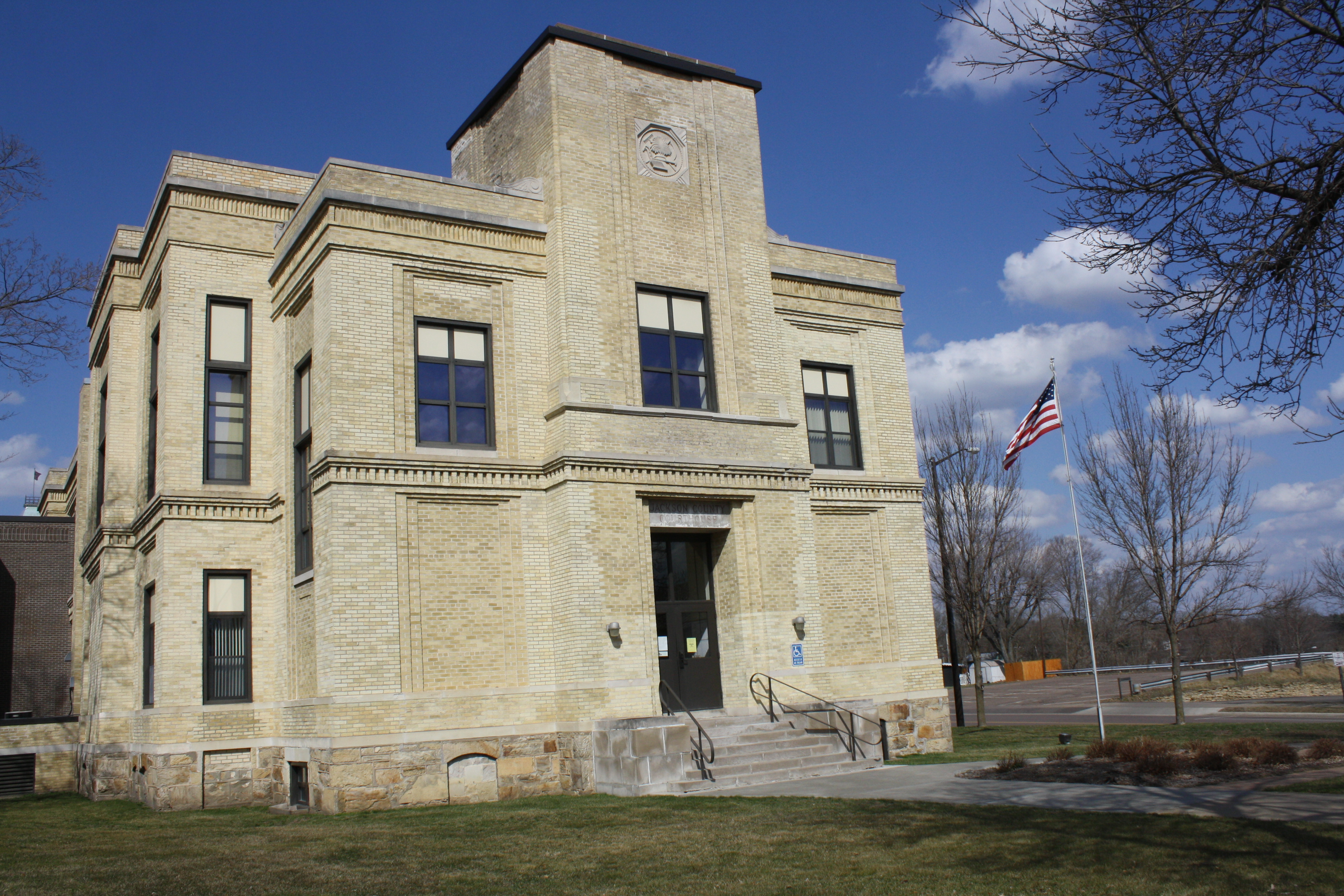
- Jackson County Courthouse

- Location within the U.S. state of Wisconsin
- Coordinates: 44°19′N 90°49′W
- Country: United States
- State: Wisconsin
- Founded: 1853
- Named for: Andrew Jackson
- Seat: Black River Falls
- Largest city: Black River Falls

Area
  - Total: 1,000 sq mi (2,600 km^{2})
  - Land: 988 sq mi (2,560 km^{2})
  - Water: 13 sq mi (34 km^{2}) 1.3%

Population (2020)
  - Total: 21,145
  - Estimate (2025): 20,999 ▼
  - Density: 21.3/sq mi (8.2/km^{2})
- Time zone: UTC−6 (Central)
  - Summer (DST): UTC−5 (CDT)
- Congressional districts: 3rd, 7th
- Website: www.co.jackson.wi.us

Jackson County is a county located in the U.S. state of Wisconsin. As of the 2020 census, the population was 21,145. Its county seat is Black River Falls. Jackson County was formed from Crawford County in 1853. It was named for President Andrew Jackson.

== Geography ==
According to the U.S. Census Bureau, the county has a total area of 1,000 square miles (2,600 km^{2}), of which 988 square miles (2,560 km^{2}) is land and 13 square miles (34 km^{2}) (1.3%) is water.

=== Adjacent counties ===
- Clark County – north
- Wood County – east
- Juneau County – southeast
- Monroe County – south
- La Crosse County – southwest
- Trempealeau County – west
- Eau Claire County – northwest

=== Major highways ===
- Interstate 94
- U.S. Highway 10
- U.S. Highway 12
- Highway 27 (Wisconsin)
- Highway 54 (Wisconsin)
- Highway 71 (Wisconsin)
- Highway 95 (Wisconsin)
- Highway 108 (Wisconsin)
- Highway 121 (Wisconsin)

=== Railroads ===
- Canadian National
- Union Pacific

=== Buses ===
- Black River Falls Public Transit

== Demographics ==
Historical population
Census	Pop.	Note	%±
1860	4,170		—
1870	7,687		84.3%
1880	13,285		72.8%
1890	15,797		18.9%
1900	17,466		10.6%
1910	17,075		−2.2%
1920	17,746		3.9%
1930	16,468		−7.2%
1940	16,599		0.8%
1950	16,073		−3.2%
1960	15,151		−5.7%
1970	15,325		1.1%
1980	16,831		9.8%
1990	16,588		−1.4%
2000	19,100		15.1%
2010	20,449		7.1%
2020	21,145		3.4%
2025 (est.)	20,999	▼	−0.7%
U.S. Decennial Census; 1790–1960 1900–90; 1990–2000 2010 2020 2025

=== Racial and ethnic composition ===
Jackson County, Wisconsin – Racial and ethnic composition Note: the US Census treats Hispanic/Latino as an ethnic category. This table excludes Latinos from the racial categories and assigns them to a separate category. Hispanics/Latinos may be of any race.
Race / ethnicity (NH = Non-Hispanic)	Pop 1980	Pop 1990	Pop 2000	Pop 2010	Pop 2020	% 1980	% 1990	% 2000	% 2010	% 2020
White alone (NH)	16,232	15,704	16,990	17,987	17,939	96.44%	94.67%	88.95%	87.96%	84.84%
Black or African American alone (NH)	34	44	428	390	440	0.20%	0.27%	2.24%	1.91%	2.08%
Native American or Alaska Native alone (NH)	494	665	1,151	1,211	1,319	2.94%	4.01%	6.03%	5.92%	6.24%
Asian alone (NH)	13	30	26	51	73	0.08%	0.18%	0.14%	0.25%	0.35%
Native Hawaiian or Pacific Islander alone (NH)	x	x	5	19	0	x	x	0.03%	0.09%	0.00%
Other race alone (NH)	15	0	5	9	45	0.09%	0.00%	0.03%	0.04%	0.21%
Mixed race or Multiracial (NH)	x	x	138	263	651	x	x	0.72%	1.29%	3.08%
Hispanic or Latino (any race)	43	145	357	519	678	0.26%	0.87%	1.87%	2.54%	3.21%
Total	16,831	16,588	19,100	20,449	21,145	100.00%	100.00%	100.00%	100.00%	100.00%

=== 2020 census ===
As of the 2020 census, the county had a population of 21,145. The population density was 21.4 people per square mile (8.3 people/km^{2}). The median age was 42.5 years, 22.4% of residents were under the age of 18, and 19.7% of residents were 65 years of age or older. For every 100 females there were 113.0 males, and for every 100 females age 18 and over there were 115.8 males age 18 and over.

There were 8,136 households in the county, of which 26.9% had children under the age of 18 living in them. Of all households, 49.0% were married-couple households, 20.5% were households with a male householder and no spouse or partner present, and 21.6% were households with a female householder and no spouse or partner present. About 28.9% of all households were made up of individuals, and 13.0% had someone living alone who was 65 years of age or older.

There were 9,613 housing units at an average density of 9.7 units per square mile (3.7 units/km^{2}), of which 15.4% were vacant. Among occupied housing units, 75.0% were owner-occupied and 25.0% were renter-occupied. The homeowner vacancy rate was 1.5% and the rental vacancy rate was 6.9%.

The racial makeup of the county was 85.8% White, 2.1% Black or African American, 6.5% American Indian and Alaska Native, 0.4% Asian, <0.1% Native Hawaiian and Pacific Islander, 1.2% from some other race, and 4.1% from two or more races. Hispanic or Latino residents of any race comprised 3.2% of the population.

20.9% of residents lived in urban areas, while 79.1% lived in rural areas.

=== 2000 census ===
2000 Census Age Pyramid for Jackson County

As of the census of 2000, there were 19,100 people, 7,070 households, and 4,835 families residing in the county. The population density was 19 people per square mile (7.3 people/km^{2}). There were 8,029 housing units at an average density of 8 units per square mile (3.1 units/km^{2}). The racial makeup of the county was 89.58% White, 2.27% Black or African American, 6.16% Native American, 0.16% Asian, 0.04% Pacific Islander, 1.01% from other races, and 0.79% from two or more races. 1.87% of the population were Hispanic or Latino of any race. 31.4% were of German, 30.2% Norwegian and 5.2% Irish ancestry. 94.7% spoke English, 2.2% Spanish and 1.5% Winnebago as their first language.

There were 7,070 households, out of which 31.00% had children under the age of 18 living with them, 55.40% were married couples living together, 8.60% had a female householder with no husband present, and 31.60% were non-families. 26.20% of all households were made up of individuals, and 11.80% had someone living alone who was 65 years of age or older. The average household size was 2.49 and the average family size was 3.00.

In the county, the population was spread out, with 24.10% under the age of 18, 8.80% from 18 to 24, 29.40% from 25 to 44, 22.80% from 45 to 64, and 14.90% who were 65 years of age or older. The median age was 38 years. For every 100 females there were 114.60 males. For every 100 females age 18 and over, there were 116.30 males.

In 2017, there were 227 births, giving a general fertility rate of 74.0 births per 1000 women aged 15–44, the 10th highest rate out of all 72 Wisconsin counties. Of these, 14 of the births occurred at home. Additionally, there were 7 reported induced abortions performed on women of Jackson County residence in 2017.

== Communities ==
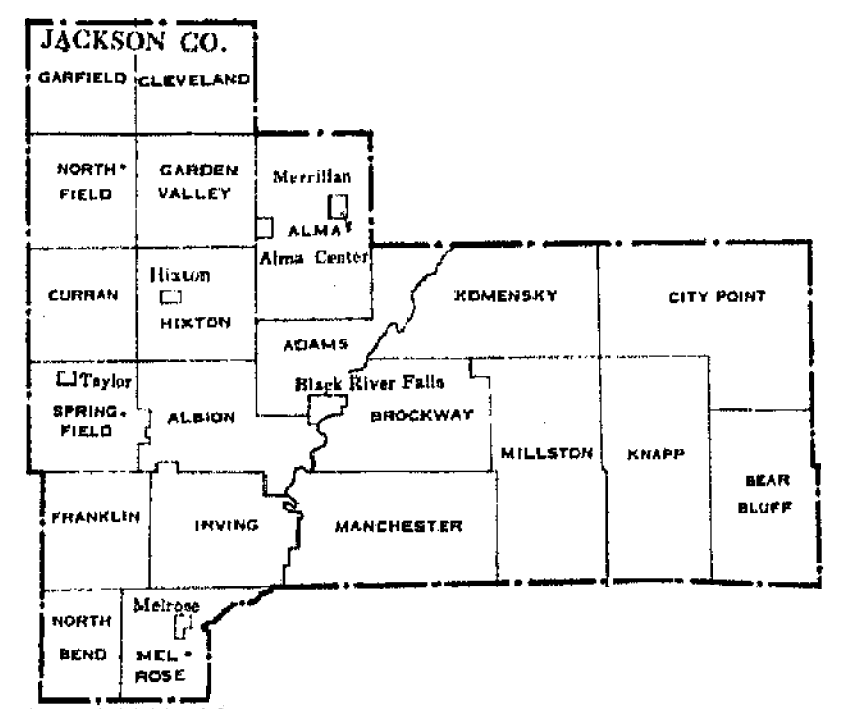
Jackson County townships map

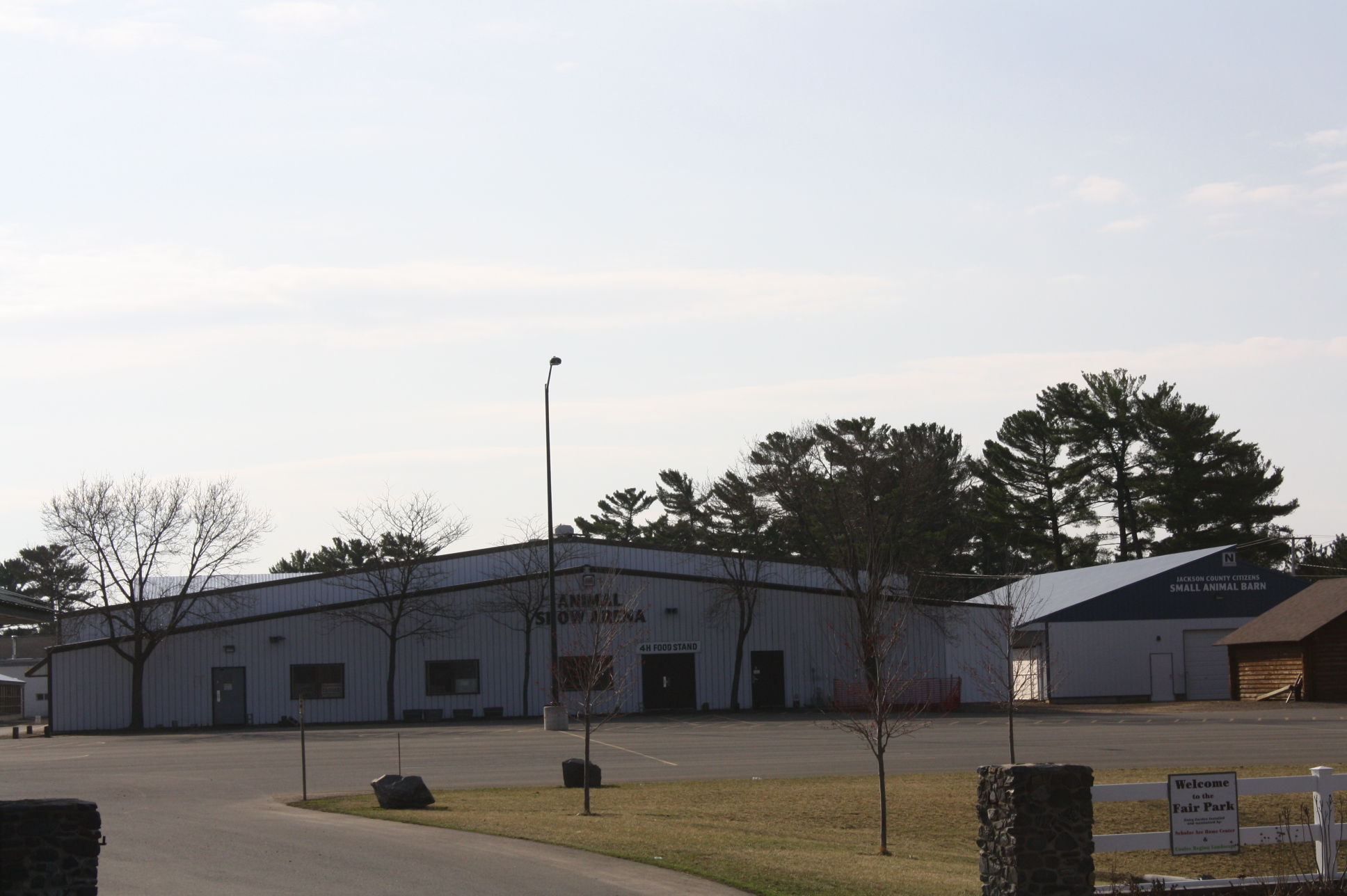
Fairgrounds

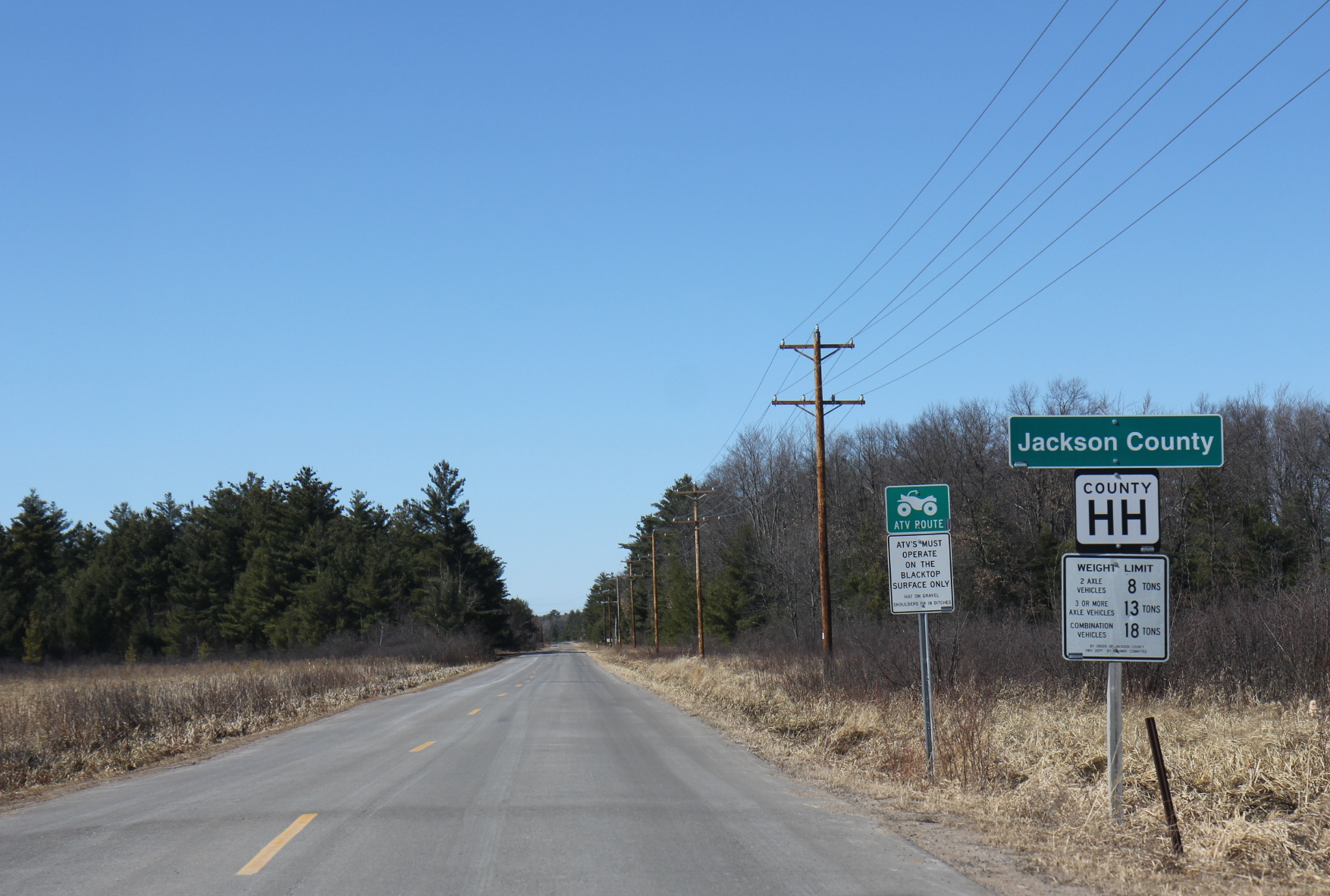
Jackson County sign on County Highway HH

=== City ===
- Black River Falls (county seat)

=== Villages ===
- Alma Center
- Hixton
- Melrose
- Merrillan
- Taylor

=== Towns ===
- Adams
- Albion
- Alma
- Bear Bluff
- Brockway
- City Point
- Cleveland
- Curran
- Franklin
- Garden Valley
- Garfield
- Hixton
- Irving
- Knapp
- Komensky
- Manchester
- Melrose
- Millston
- North Bend
- Northfield
- Springfield

=== Census-designated places ===
- Hatfield
- Millston
- Mission
- Sand Pillow

=== Other unincorporated communities ===
- Brockway
- Buckholz Corners
- City Point
- Disco
- Fall Hall Glen
- Franklin
- Irving
- Levis
- North Bend
- North Branch
- Northfield
- Pray
- Price
- Requa
- Sechlerville
- Shamrock
- Spaulding
- Speck Oaks
- Vaudreuil
- Waterbury
- Winnebago Mission
- York

=== Ghost towns/neighborhoods ===
- Charter Oak Mills
- Clay
- Rogneys
- Wrightsville

== Politics ==
United States presidential election results for Jackson County, Wisconsin
Year	Republican		Democratic		Third party(ies)	
Year	No.	%	No.	%	No.	%
1892	2,078	59.76%	1,160	33.36%	239	6.87%
1896	2,710	74.57%	778	21.41%	146	4.02%
1900	2,639	77.73%	651	19.18%	105	3.09%
1904	2,746	82.76%	479	14.44%	93	2.80%
1908	2,603	77.91%	631	18.89%	107	3.20%
1912	1,398	52.77%	606	22.88%	645	24.35%
1916	1,866	64.17%	963	33.12%	79	2.72%
1920	3,652	85.93%	410	9.65%	188	4.42%
1924	1,662	32.24%	255	4.95%	3,238	62.81%
1928	4,353	75.17%	1,364	23.55%	74	1.28%
1932	1,983	33.50%	3,813	64.42%	123	2.08%
1936	2,235	32.02%	4,537	65.01%	207	2.97%
1940	3,741	48.08%	3,975	51.09%	64	0.82%
1944	3,182	50.86%	3,040	48.59%	34	0.54%
1948	2,553	45.89%	2,921	52.51%	89	1.60%
1952	4,235	59.89%	2,819	39.87%	17	0.24%
1956	3,614	56.66%	2,755	43.20%	9	0.14%
1960	3,950	57.98%	2,849	41.82%	14	0.21%
1964	2,532	39.83%	3,818	60.06%	7	0.11%
1968	3,172	52.88%	2,293	38.22%	534	8.90%
1972	3,937	60.79%	2,445	37.75%	94	1.45%
1976	3,406	46.89%	3,735	51.42%	123	1.69%
1980	4,327	50.80%	3,629	42.61%	561	6.59%
1984	4,386	55.81%	3,427	43.61%	46	0.59%
1988	3,555	47.29%	3,924	52.20%	38	0.51%
1992	2,644	31.41%	3,681	43.73%	2,093	24.86%
1996	2,262	31.08%	3,705	50.90%	1,312	18.02%
2000	3,670	43.60%	4,380	52.04%	367	4.36%
2004	4,387	45.11%	5,249	53.97%	90	0.93%
2008	3,552	38.40%	5,572	60.23%	127	1.37%
2012	3,900	41.88%	5,298	56.89%	115	1.23%
2016	4,906	52.94%	3,818	41.20%	543	5.86%
2020	5,791	56.86%	4,256	41.79%	137	1.35%
2024	6,204	59.07%	4,157	39.58%	141	1.34%

Between 1928 and 1984, Jackson County voted for the nationwide winner in every election with the exception of 1944 (by less than 3%) and 1960 (one of the closest elections in American history). In the 1930s was the county was a stronghold for the Wisconsin Progressive Party - National Progressives. voting consistently for Philip La Follette during gubernatorial elections and Robert M. La Follette Jr. for senate. Then, from 1988 to 2012, like most of the rural counties in southwestern Wisconsin, it backed the Democratic candidate in each election, and did so by more than an 8% margin each time beginning in 1992. In 2016, once again like the rest of rural southwestern Wisconsin, Jackson County dramatically swung to the right, shifting from a 15% victory for Democrat Barack Obama in 2012 to a 12% victory for Republican Donald Trump in 2016. Trump further expanded his margin of victory to over 15% in 2020 and to nearly 20% in 2024, achieving the highest vote share for a Republican in the county since Richard Nixon in his 1972 landslide reelection.

== Economy ==
The county's largest employer is the Ho-Chunk Nation, which employs roughly 3100 people combined in Jackson and Sauk counties.

== Education ==
School districts include:

- Alma Center School District
- Black River Falls School District
- Blair-Taylor School District
- Melrose-Mindoro School District
- Osseo-Fairchild School District
- Pittsville School District
- Tomah Area School District
- Whitehall School District

== See also ==
- National Register of Historic Places listings in Jackson County, Wisconsin
