= Knapp, Jackson County, Wisconsin =

Coordinates: 44°15′29″N 90°30′19″W

Knapp, Wisconsin
- Town
- Town of Knapp
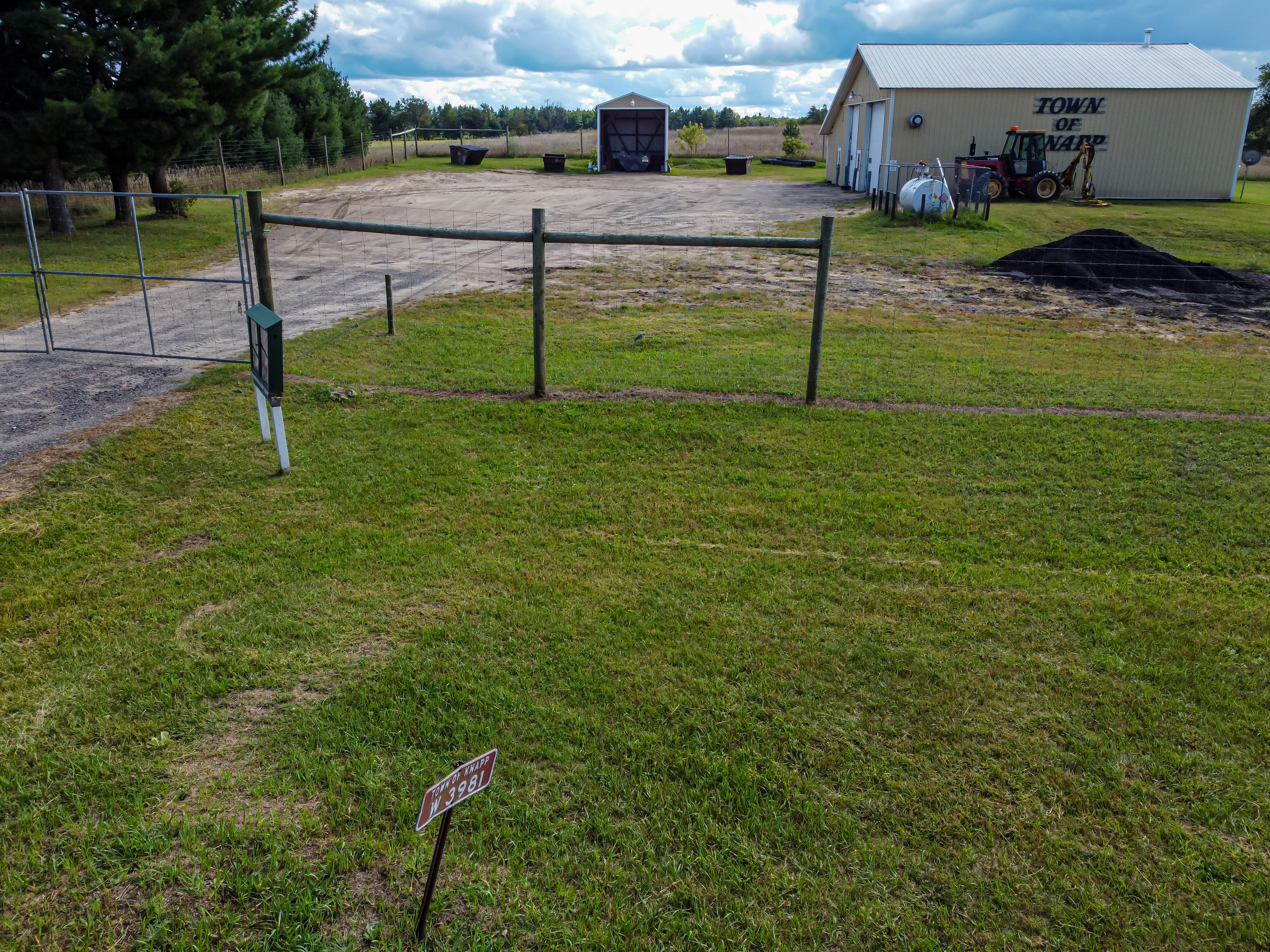
- Town hall

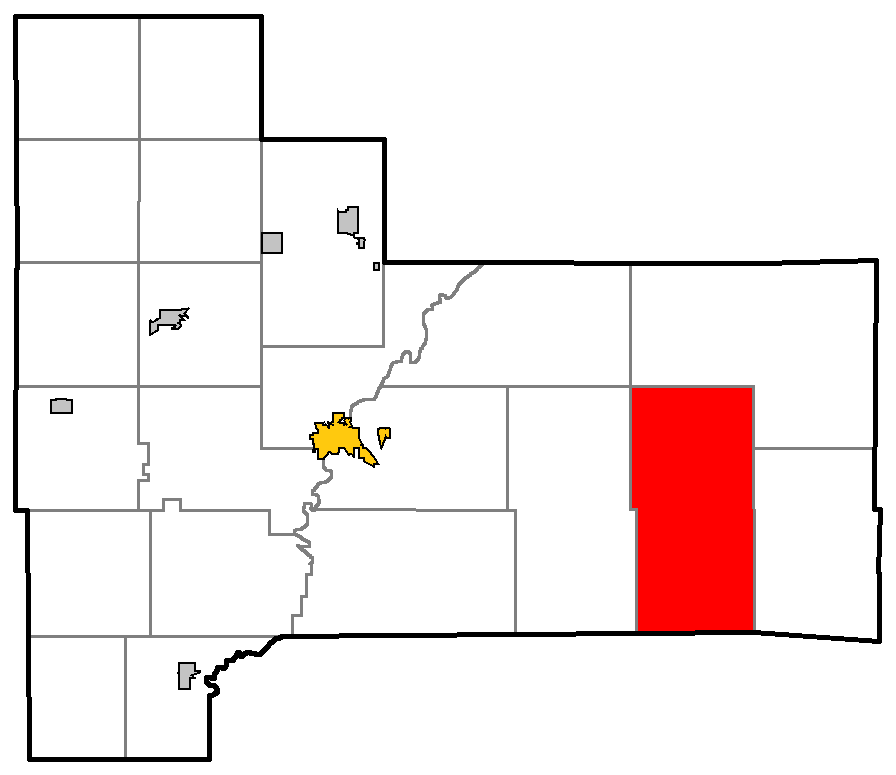
- Location of Knapp in Jackson County, Wisconsin.

- Location of Jackson County, Wisconsin
- Country: United States
- State: Wisconsin
- County: Jackson
- Incorporated: 1889

Area
  - Total: 71.33 sq mi (184.7 km^{2})
  - Land: 68.97 sq mi (178.6 km^{2})
  - Water: 2.35 sq mi (6.1 km^{2})

Population (2020)
  - Total: 303
  - Density: 4.39/sq mi (1.70/km^{2})

Knapp is a town in Jackson County, Wisconsin, United States. As of the 2020 census, the town population was 303. The unincorporated community of Lapham Junction is located in the town.

== History ==
Knapp was formed out of a portion of the town of Millston in 1889.

== Geography ==
According to the United States Census Bureau, the town has a total area of 71.6 square miles (185.3 km^{2}), of which 69.1 square miles (179.0 km^{2}) is land and 2.4 square miles (6.3 km^{2}) (3.38%) is water.

== Demographics ==
As of the census of 2000, there were 275 people, 113 households, and 89 families residing in the town. The population density was 4.0 people per square mile (1.5/km^{2}). There were 131 housing units at an average density of 1.9 per square mile (0.7/km^{2}). The racial makeup of the town was 99.27% White, 0.36% Asian, and 0.36% from two or more races.

There were 113 households, out of which 29.2% had children under the age of 18 living with them, 72.6% were married couples living together, 3.5% had a female householder with no husband present, and 20.4% were non-families. 15.9% of all households were made up of individuals, and 4.4% had someone living alone who was 65 years of age or older. The average household size was 2.43 and the average family size was 2.73.

In the town, the population was spread out, with 21.8% under the age of 18, 6.5% from 18 to 24, 30.9% from 25 to 44, 24.0% from 45 to 64, and 16.7% who were 65 years of age or older. The median age was 40 years. For every 100 females, there were 111.5 males. For every 100 females age 18 and over, there were 106.7 males.

The median income for a household in the town was $40,446, and the median income for a family was $41,771. Males had a median income of $35,500 versus $21,607 for females. The per capita income for the town was $19,212. About 6.1% of families and 7.0% of the population were below the poverty line, including 6.3% of those under the age of 18 and 10.3% of those 65 or over.

In 2021, there were 482 people residing in the town.
