= Kurt Creek =

Creek in central Wisconsin

- Location within Wisconsin Location within the United States

Location
- Country: United States
- State: Wisconsin

Physical characteristics
- Source: East of City Point
  - coordinates: 44.3419076°N 90.2373556°W
- Mouth: East Fork Black River
  - location: Hiles
  - coordinates: 44.3666297°N 90.2737446°W
  - elevation: 958 ft (292 m)

Kurt Creek is a stream in the U.S. state of Wisconsin. It is a tributary to the East Fork Black River. The headwaters of the creek is used for cranberry bogs.

Kurt Creek most likely was named after a settler named Kurt or Kert.
