= City Point (community), Wisconsin =

City Point, Wisconsin
- Unincorporated community
- Location within Wisconsin Location within the United States
- Coordinates: 44°21′08″N 90°19′17″W
- Country: United States
- State: Wisconsin
- County: Jackson
- Town: City Point
- Elevation: 968 ft (295 m)
- Time zone: UTC-6 (Central (CST))
  - Summer (DST): UTC-5 (CDT)
- Area codes: 715 & 534
- GNIS feature ID: 1563096

City Point is an unincorporated community located in the town of City Point, Jackson County, Wisconsin, United States. City Point is located on Wisconsin Highway 54, 25 miles (40 km) west of Wisconsin Rapids.

== Geography ==
- Kurt Creek

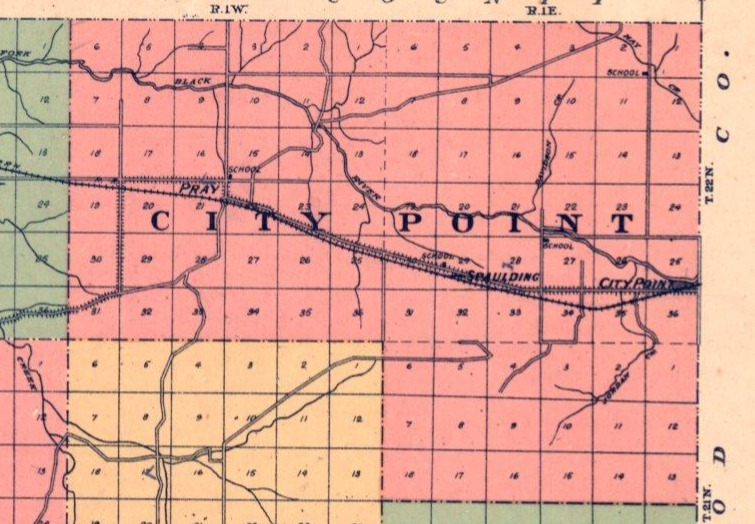
1914 map of town of City Point, showing locations of communities of City Point, Pray, and Spaulding.
