= North Bend (community), Wisconsin =

North Bend, Wisconsin
- Unincorporated community
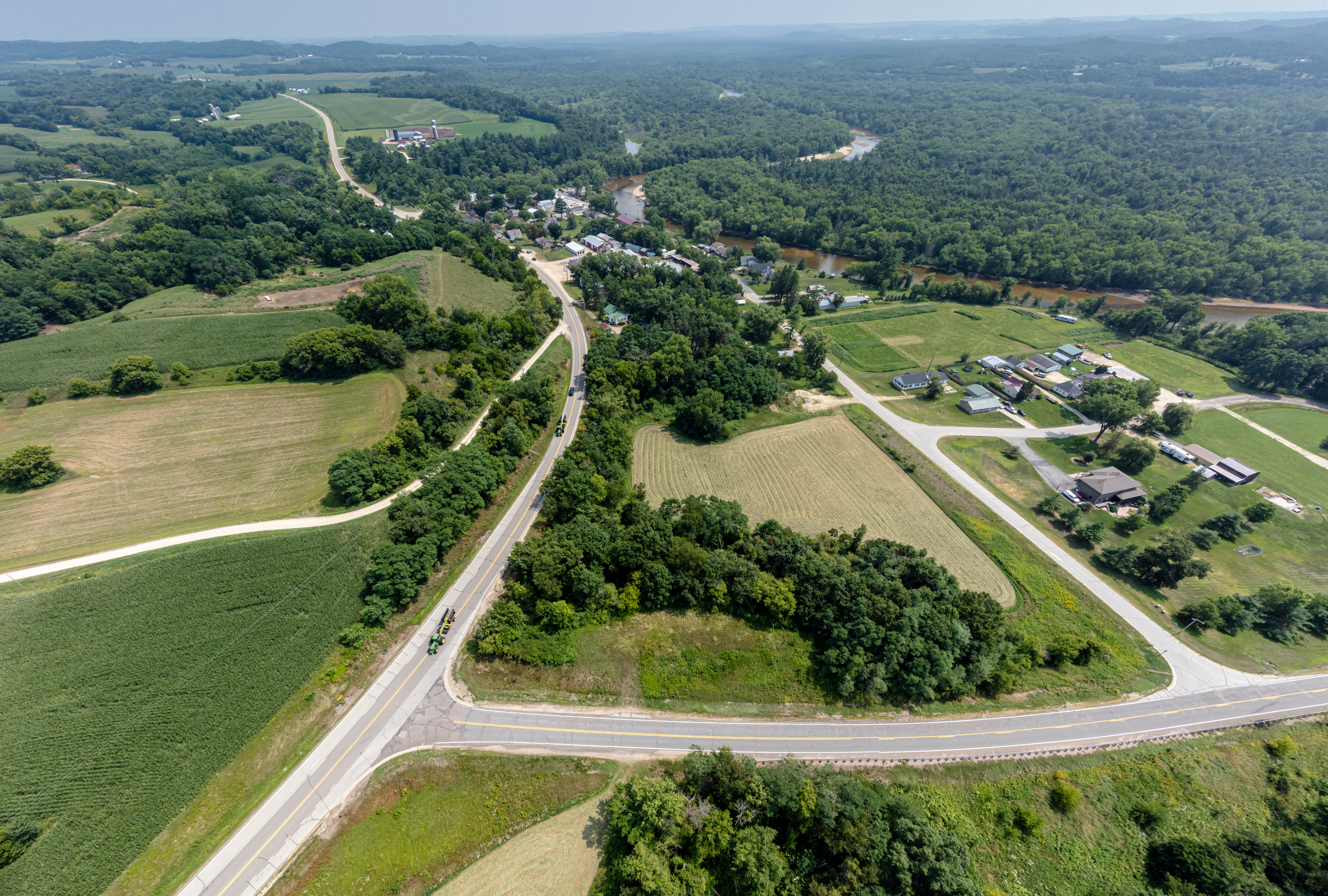
- Wisconsin Highway 54 runs through town

- Location within Wisconsin Location within the United States
- Coordinates: 44°05′29″N 91°07′01″W
- Country: United States
- State: Wisconsin
- County: Jackson
- Town: North Bend
- Elevation: 715 ft (218 m)
- Time zone: UTC-6 (Central (CST))
  - Summer (DST): UTC-5 (CDT)
- Area codes: 715 & 534
- GNIS feature ID: 1570359

North Bend is an unincorporated community in the town of North Bend, Jackson County, Wisconsin, United States. North Bend is located on the Black River and Wisconsin Highway 54, 6.7 miles (10.8 km) west-southwest of Melrose.

== Images ==
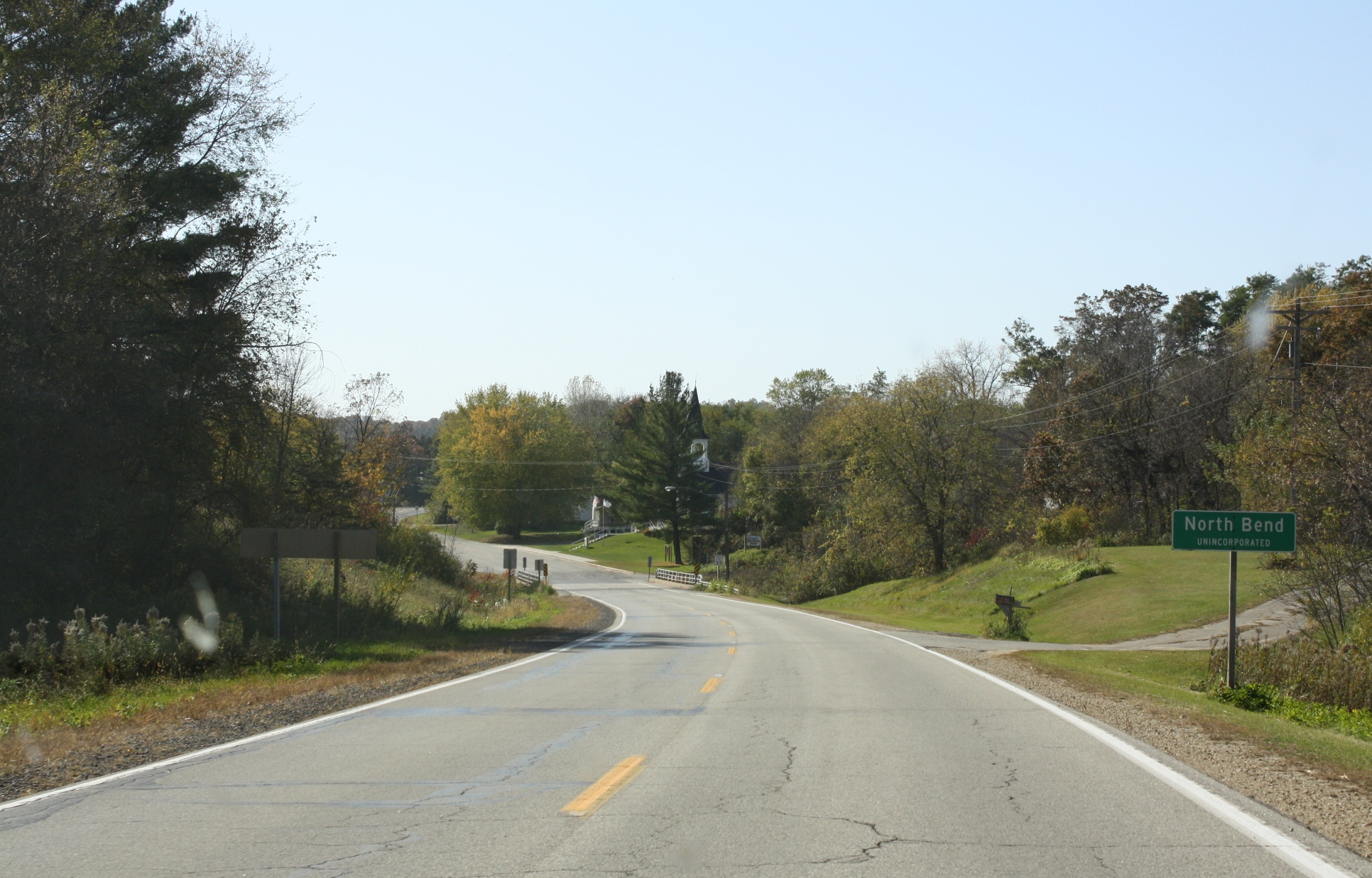
Sign

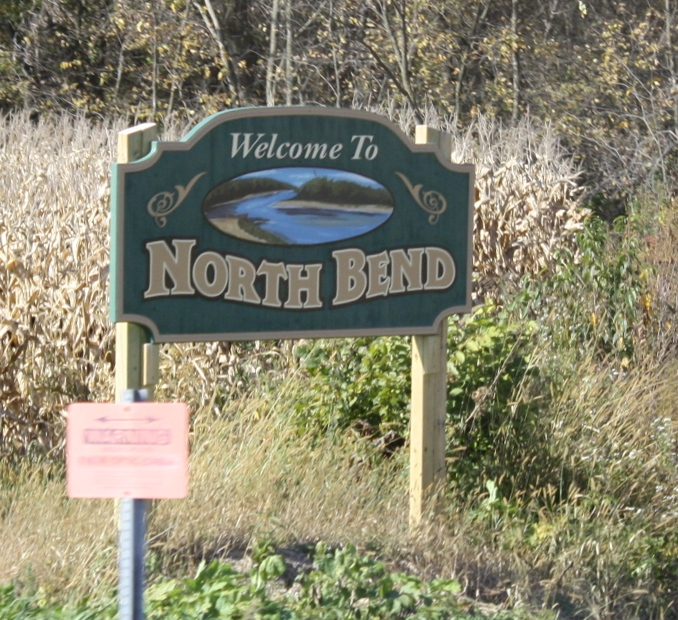
Welcome sign

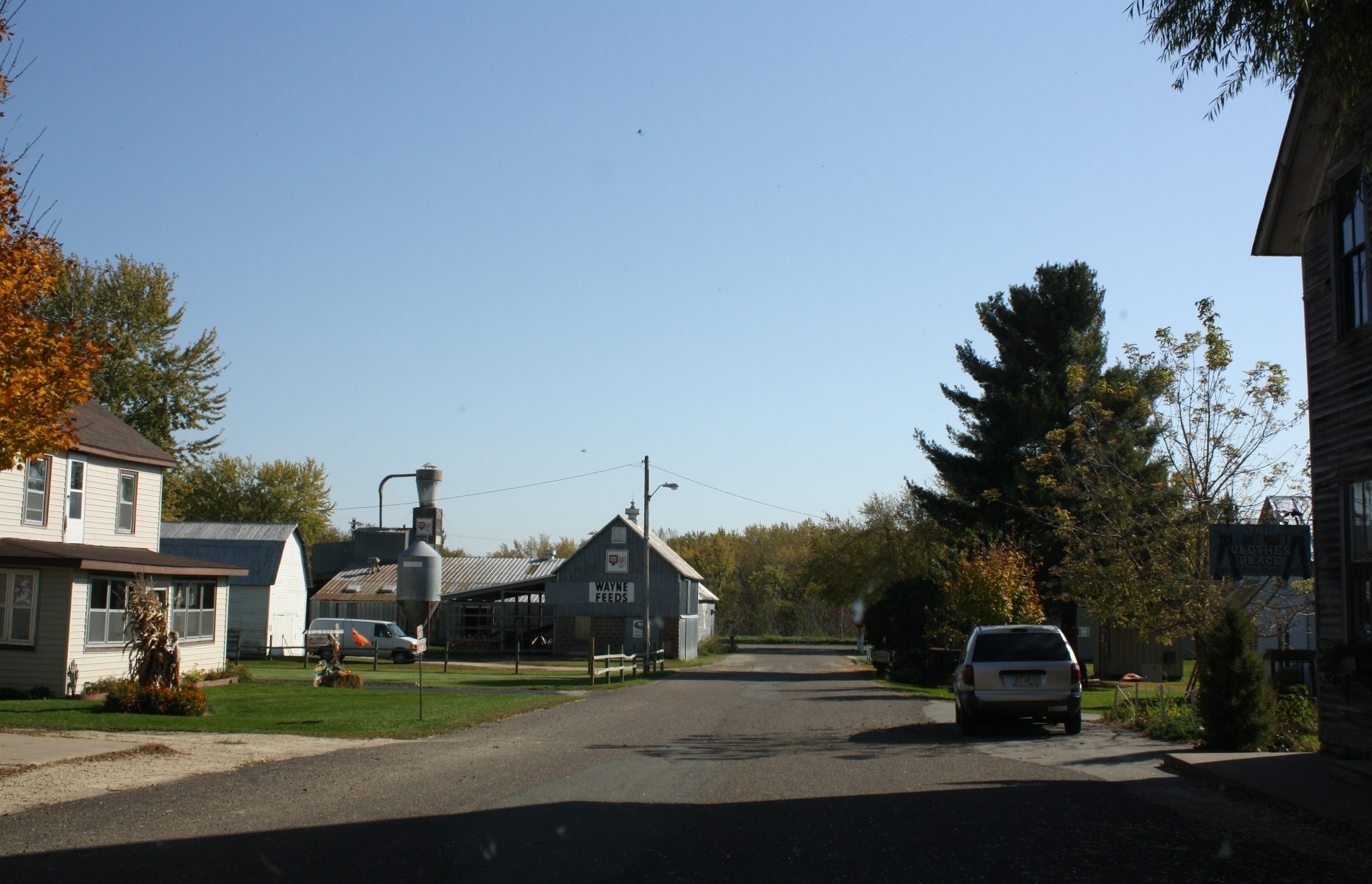
Back Street in North Bend

== See also ==
- Wisconsin Highway 54
