= Millston, Wisconsin =

- Town
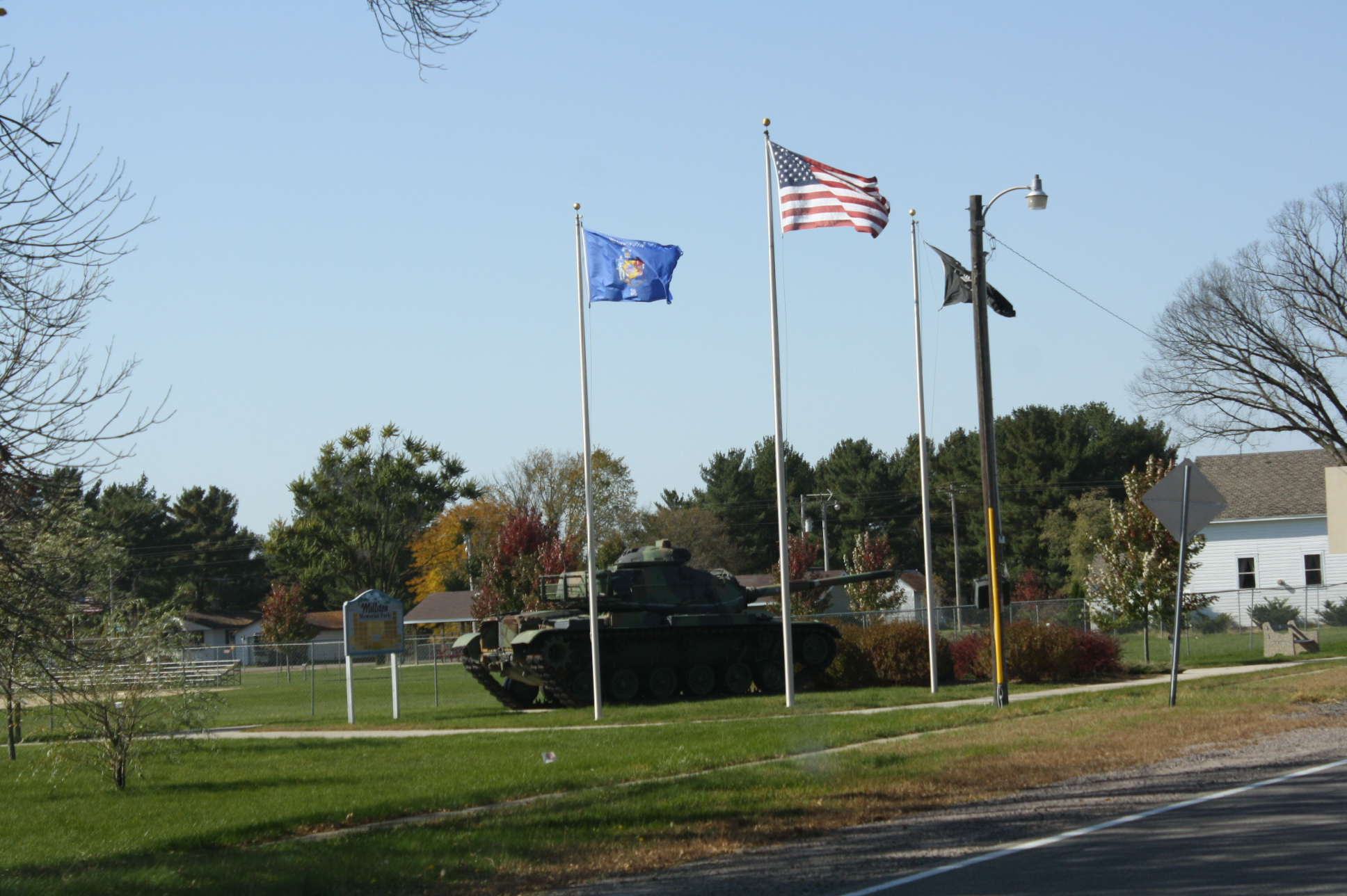
- Millston Memorial Park in the community of Millston

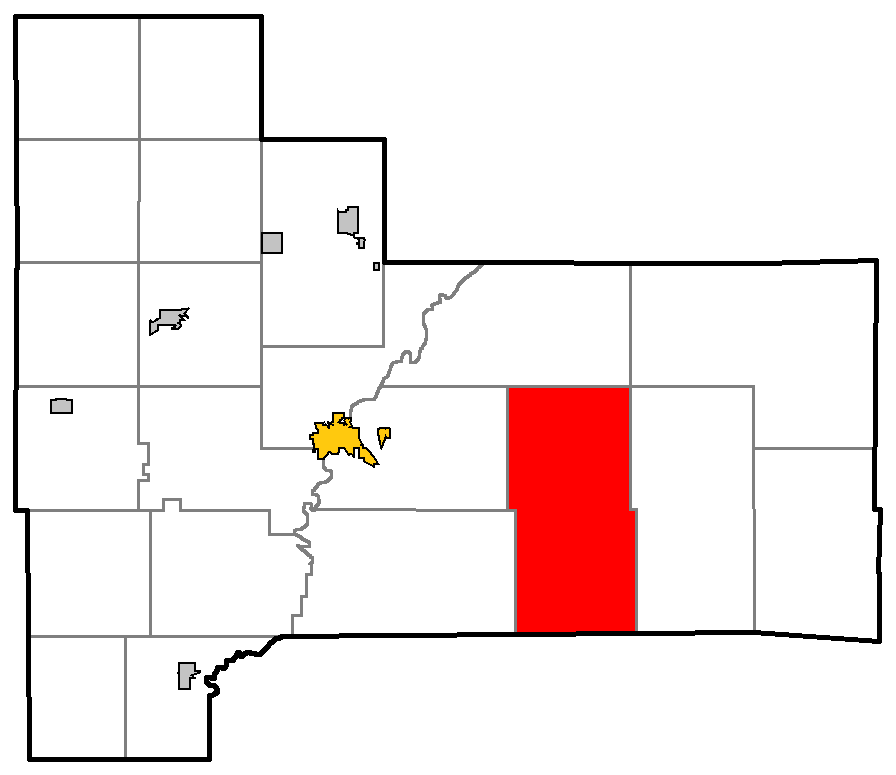
- Location of Millston, Jackson County

- Location of Jackson County, Wisconsin
- Coordinates: 44°12′24″N 90°38′16″W
- Country: United States
- State: Wisconsin
- County: Jackson

Area
  - Total: 72.4 sq mi (187.5 km^{2})
  - Land: 70.9 sq mi (183.7 km^{2})
  - Water: 1.5 sq mi (3.8 km^{2})
- Elevation: 968 ft (295 m)

Population (2020)
  - Total: 168
  - Density: 2.37/sq mi (0.915/km^{2})
- Time zone: UTC-6 (Central (CST))
  - Summer (DST): UTC-5 (CDT)
- FIPS code: 55-52050
- GNIS feature ID: 1583717
- Website: https://millstonwi.gov/

Millston is a town in Jackson County, Wisconsin, United States. The population was 168 at the 2020 census. The unincorporated community of Speck Oaks is located in the town. The census-designated place of Millston is also located in the town.

== History ==
Millston was created out of the town of Manchester in 1874.

== Geography ==
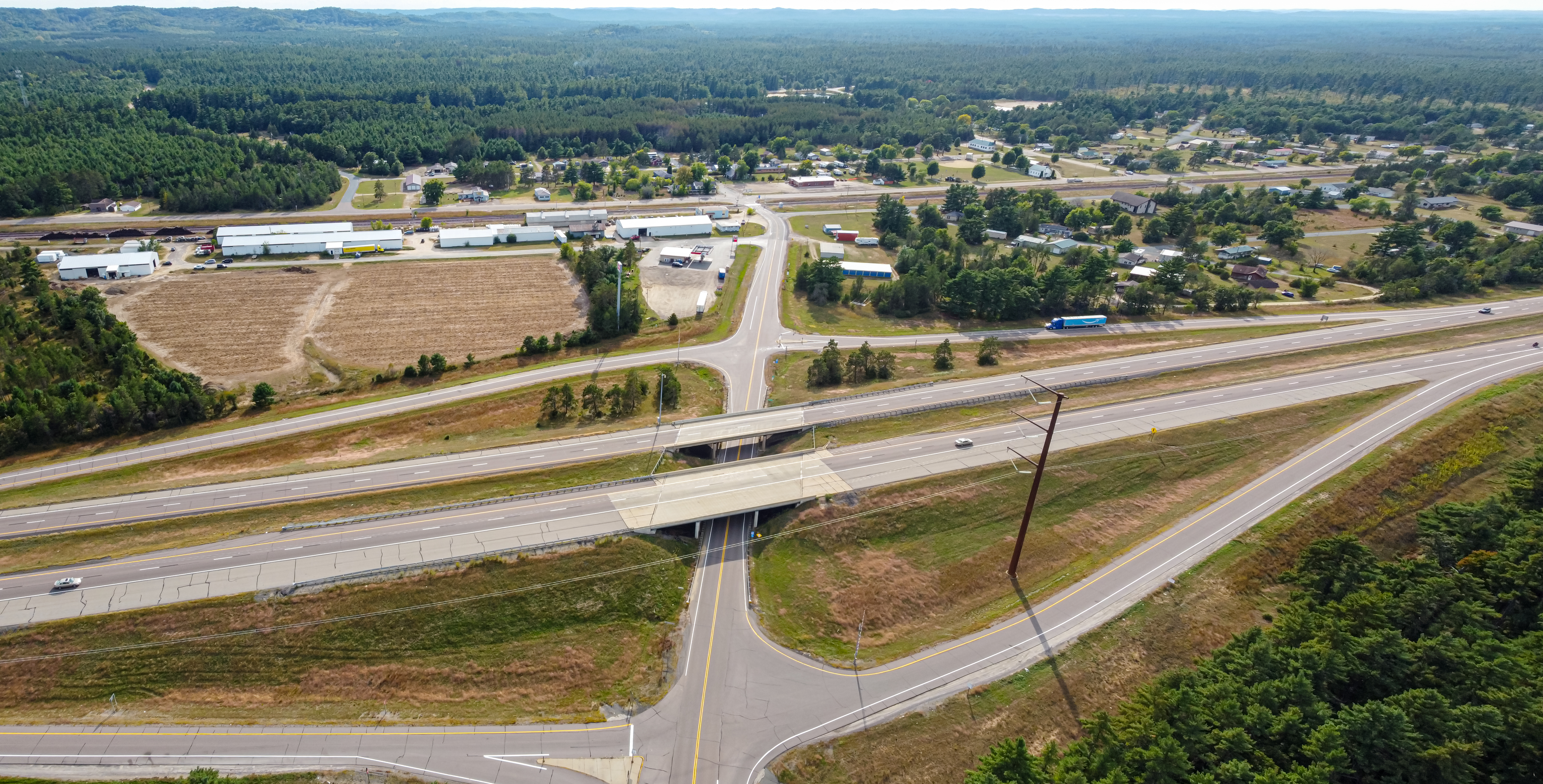

According to the United States Census Bureau, the town has a total area of 72.4 square miles (187.5 km^{2}), of which 70.9 square miles (183.7 km^{2}) is land and 1.5 square miles (3.8 km^{2}) (2.02%) is water.

== Demographics ==
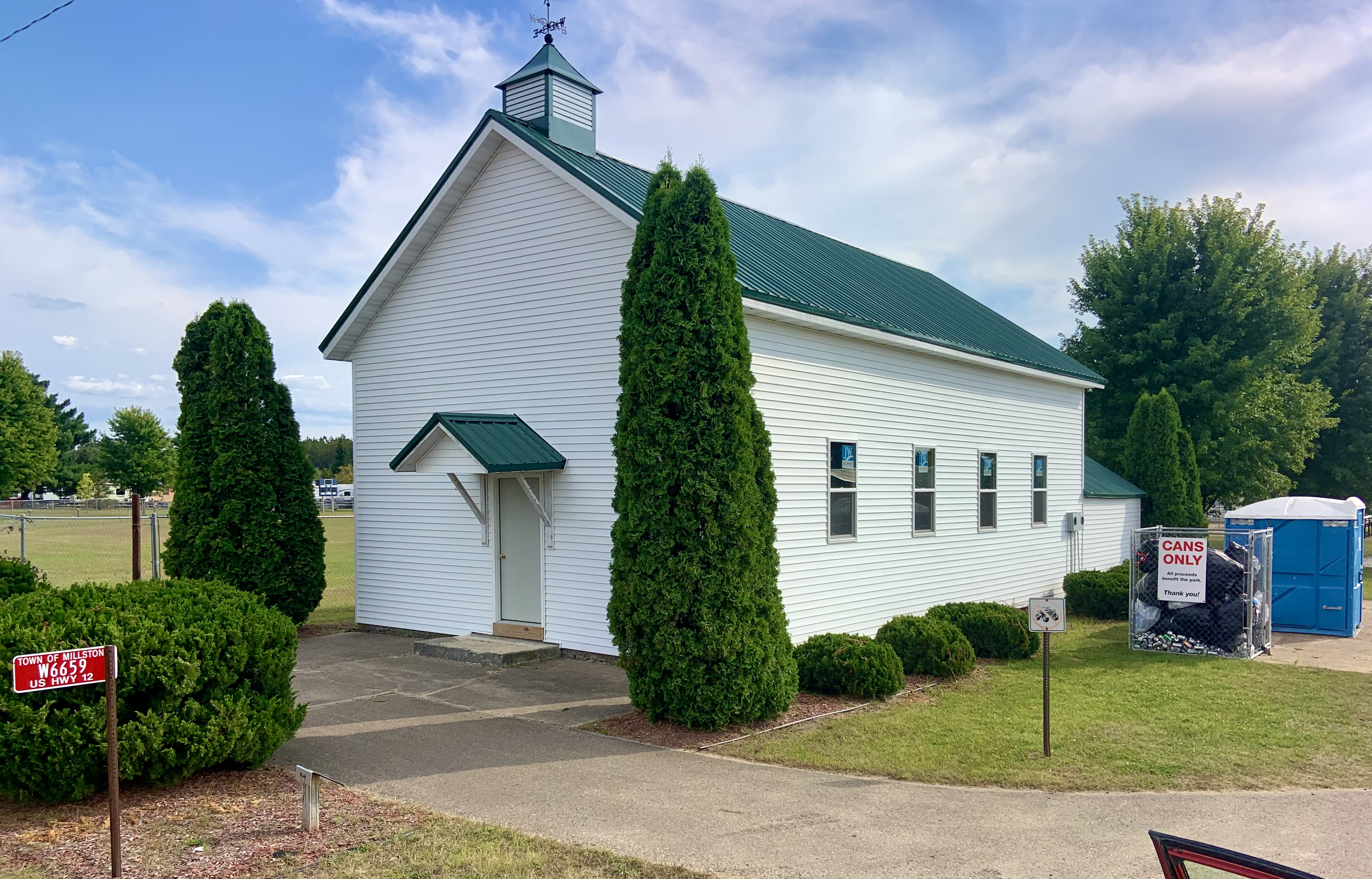
Millston Town Hall

As of the census of 2000, there were 136 people, 69 households, and 36 families residing in the town. The population density was 1.9 people per square mile (0.7/km^{2}). There were 98 housing units at an average density of 1.4 per square mile (0.5/km^{2}). The racial makeup of the town was 94.12% White and 5.88% Native American.

There were 69 households, out of which 14.5% had children under the age of 18 living with them, 43.5% were married couples living together, 2.9% had a female householder with no husband present, and 46.4% were non-families. 40.6% of all households were made up of individuals, and 14.5% had someone living alone who was 65 years of age or older. The average household size was 1.97 and the average family size was 2.62.

In the town, the population was spread out, with 16.9% under the age of 18, 3.7% from 18 to 24, 22.1% from 25 to 44, 33.1% from 45 to 64, and 24.3% who were 65 years of age or older. The median age was 50 years. For every 100 females, there were 109.2 males. For every 100 females age 18 and over, there were 117.3 males.

The median income for a household in the town was $27,500, and the median income for a family was $41,250. Males had a median income of $35,417 versus $23,125 for females. The per capita income for the town was $18,914. None of the population and none of the families were below the poverty line.
