= Hixton (town), Wisconsin =

Hixton
- Town
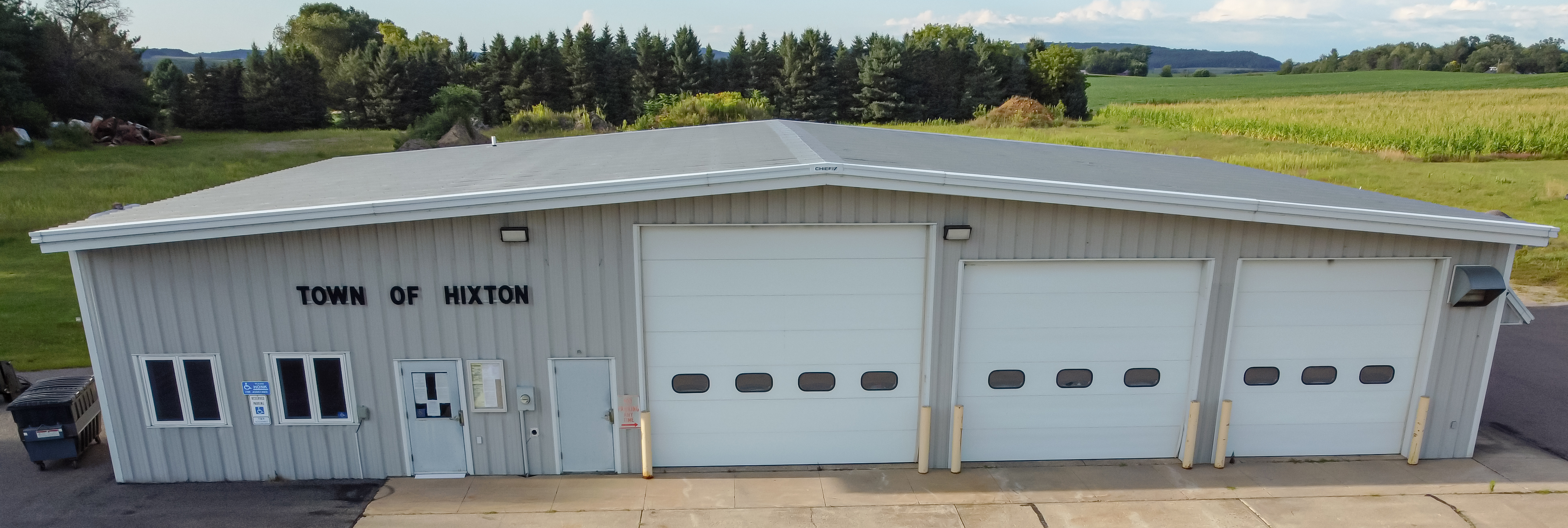
- Town hall

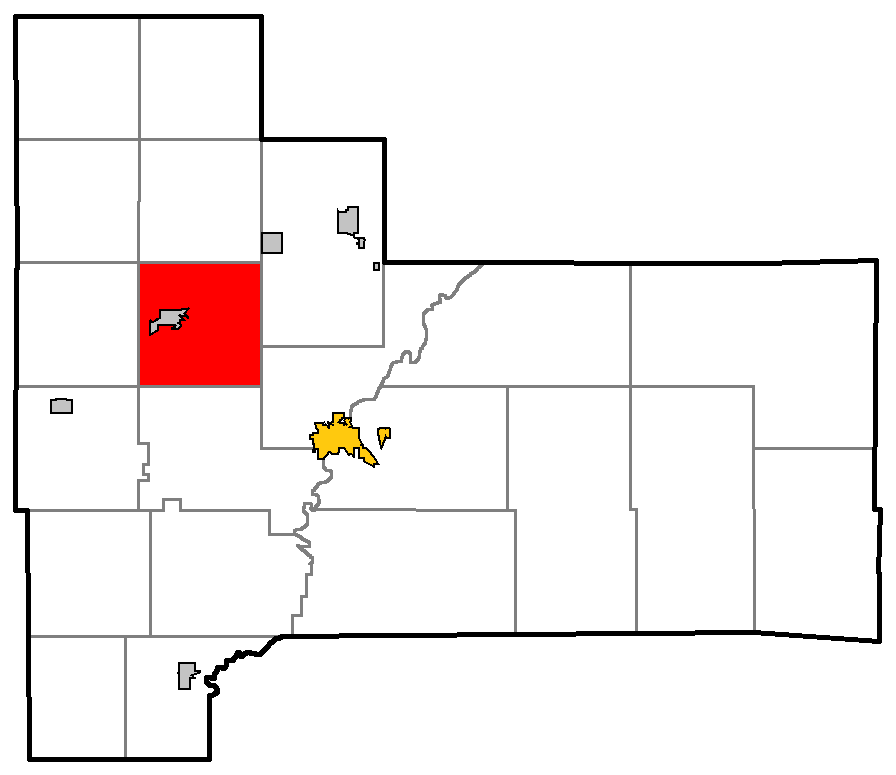
- Location within Jackson County, Wisconsin

- Location within the state of Wisconsin
- Coordinates: 44°22′55″N 91°0′53″W
- Country: United States
- State: Wisconsin
- County: Jackson

Area
  - Total: 34.9 sq mi (90.4 km^{2})
  - Land: 34.9 sq mi (90.4 km^{2})
  - Water: 0.039 sq mi (0.1 km^{2})

Population (2020)
  - Total: 620
  - Density: 18/sq mi (6.9/km^{2})
- Time zone: UTC-6 (Central (CST))
  - Summer (DST): UTC-5 (CDT)
- Area codes: 715 & 534

Hixton is a town in Jackson County, Wisconsin, United States. The population was 620 at the 2020 census. The Village of Hixton is located within the town. The unincorporated community of Sechlerville is also located in the town.

== History ==
The town of Hixton was created out of a portion of the town of Albion in 1856. It is named for John L. Hicks, an early settler who came to the area in 1854.

== Geography ==
According to the United States Census Bureau, the town has a total area of 34.9 square miles (90.4 km^{2}), of which 34.9 square miles (90.4 km^{2}) is land and 0.04 square mile (0.1 km^{2}) (0.06%) is water.

== Demographics ==
As of the census of 2000, there were 611 people, 214 households, and 166 families residing in the town. The population density was 17.5 people per square mile (6.8/km^{2}). There were 251 housing units at an average density of 7.2 per square mile (2.8/km^{2}). The racial makeup of the town was 94.76% White, 1.96% Native American, 2.45% from other races, and 0.82% from two or more races. 2.95% of the population were Hispanic or Latino of any race.

There were 214 households, out of which 37.9% had children under the age of 18 living with them, 60.3% were married couples living together, 11.2% had a female householder with no husband present, and 22.4% were non-families. 14.5% of all households were made up of individuals, and 5.6% had someone living alone who was 65 years of age or older. The average household size was 2.86 and the average family size was 3.18.

In the town, the population was spread out, with 29.3% under the age of 18, 9.0% from 18 to 24, 30.8% from 25 to 44, 21.1% from 45 to 64, and 9.8% who were 65 years of age or older. The median age was 33 years. For every 100 females, there were 115.1 males. For every 100 females age 18 and over, there were 110.7 males.

The median income for a household in the town was $38,056, and the median income for a family was $39,167. Males had a median income of $26,845 versus $19,375 for females. The per capita income for the town was $15,866. About 5.6% of families and 6.3% of the population were below the poverty line, including 7.7% of those under age 18 and none of those age 65 or over.
