= North Bend, West Virginia =

- Unincorporated community
- Location within West Virginia Location within the United States
- Coordinates: 38°13′47″N 80°26′35″W
- Country: United States
- State: West Virginia
- County: Greenbrier
- Elevation: 2,792 ft (851 m)
- Time zone: UTC-5 (Eastern (EST))
  - Summer (DST): UTC-4 (EDT)
- Area codes: 304 & 681
- GNIS feature ID: 1552314

North Bend was a village in Greenbrier County, West Virginia, United States. It was located on the east side of the North Fork of the Cherry River, on both sides of the mouth of Little Lick Run, within the current boundaries of the Monongahela National Forest, and along combined state routes 39 and 55, about 4.5 miles (7.2 km) east of Richwood.

A 1925 United States Geological Survey map shows about a dozen houses at North Bend, with a railroad extending around and past the village to a mining camp further up the river, below Rockcamp Knob. A timber railroad extends from North Bend into the hills to the northeast. However, on a 1939 map all of the structures are gone, and the railroad has been replaced by unimproved road. By 1977, a roadside park known as the North Bend Picnic Area was established on the site of the village.
