= North Bend, Wisconsin =

- Town
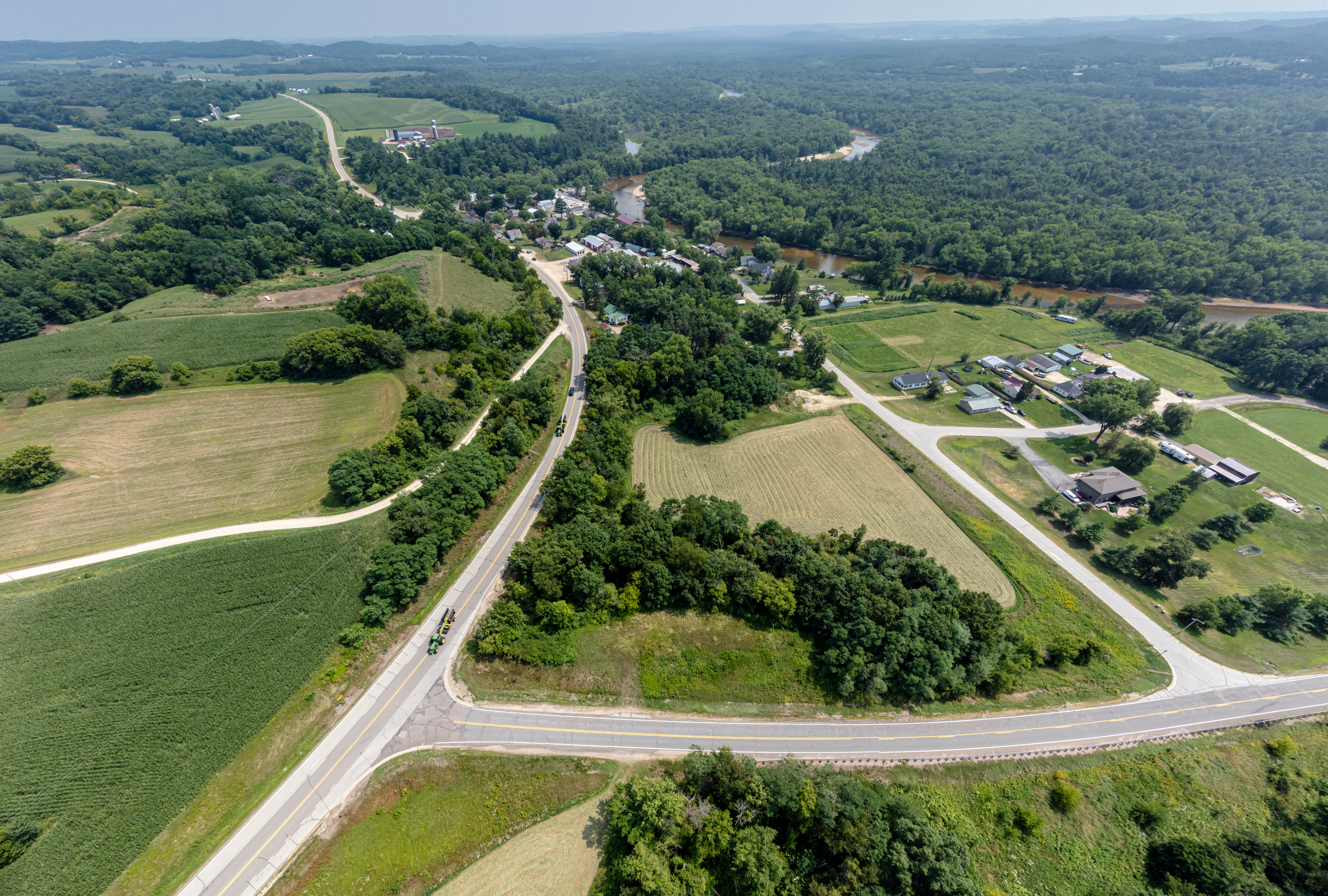

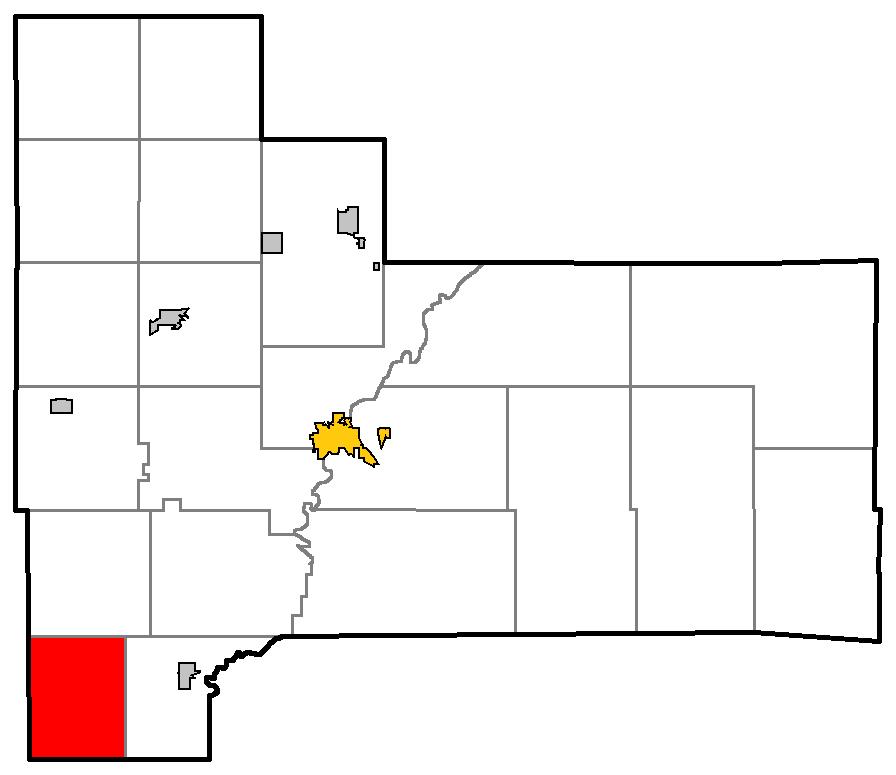
- Location of North Bend, Jackson County

- Location of Jackson County, Wisconsin
- Coordinates: 44°7′1″N 91°6′56″W
- Country: United States
- State: Wisconsin
- County: Jackson

Area
  - Total: 28.3 sq mi (73.3 km^{2})
  - Land: 27.8 sq mi (72.0 km^{2})
  - Water: 0.50 sq mi (1.3 km^{2})
- Elevation: 820 ft (250 m)

Population (2020)
  - Total: 491
  - Density: 17.7/sq mi (6.82/km^{2})
- Time zone: UTC-6 (Central (CST))
  - Summer (DST): UTC-5 (CDT)
- FIPS code: 55-57775
- GNIS feature ID: 1583825
- Website: https://northbendwi.gov/

North Bend is a town in Jackson County, Wisconsin, United States. The population was 491 at the 2020 census. The unincorporated communities of Buckholz Corners and North Bend are located in the town.

== Geography ==
According to the United States Census Bureau, the town has a total area of 28.3 square miles (73.3 km^{2}), of which 27.8 square miles (71.9 km^{2}) is land and 0.5 square mile (1.3 km^{2}) (1.84%) is water.

== Demographics ==
As of the census of 2000, there were 397 people, 145 households, and 108 families residing in the town. The population density was 14.3 people per square mile (5.5/km^{2}). There were 166 housing units at an average density of 6.0 per square mile (2.3/km^{2}). The racial makeup of the town was 99.75% White and 0.25% Asian. Hispanic or Latino of any race were 0.25% of the population.

There were 145 households, out of which 31.0% had children under the age of 18 living with them, 64.8% were married couples living together, 6.2% had a female householder with no husband present, and 25.5% were non-families. 19.3% of all households were made up of individuals, and 6.9% had someone living alone who was 65 years of age or older. The average household size was 2.74 and the average family size was 3.18.

In the town, the population was spread out, with 24.4% under the age of 18, 7.1% from 18 to 24, 28.7% from 25 to 44, 29.7% from 45 to 64, and 10.1% who were 65 years of age or older. The median age was 39 years. For every 100 females, there were 103.6 males. For every 100 females age 18 and over, there were 111.3 males.

The median income for a household in the town was $39,018, and the median income for a family was $50,625. Males had a median income of $28,750 versus $19,306 for females. The per capita income for the town was $19,341. About 2.0% of families and 3.0% of the population were below the poverty line, including none of those under age 18 and 4.5% of those age 65 or over.

== Images ==
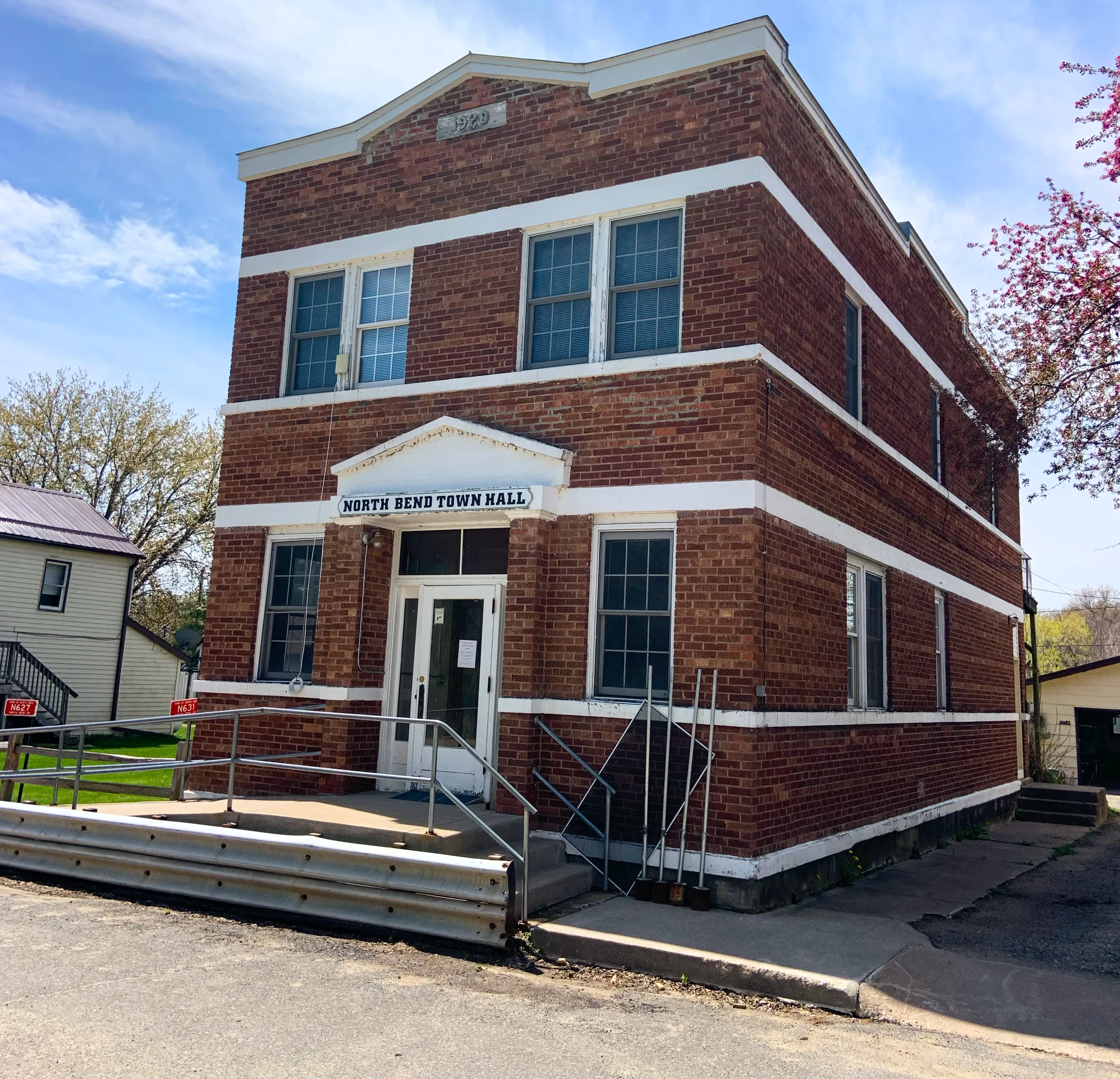
North Bend Town Hall

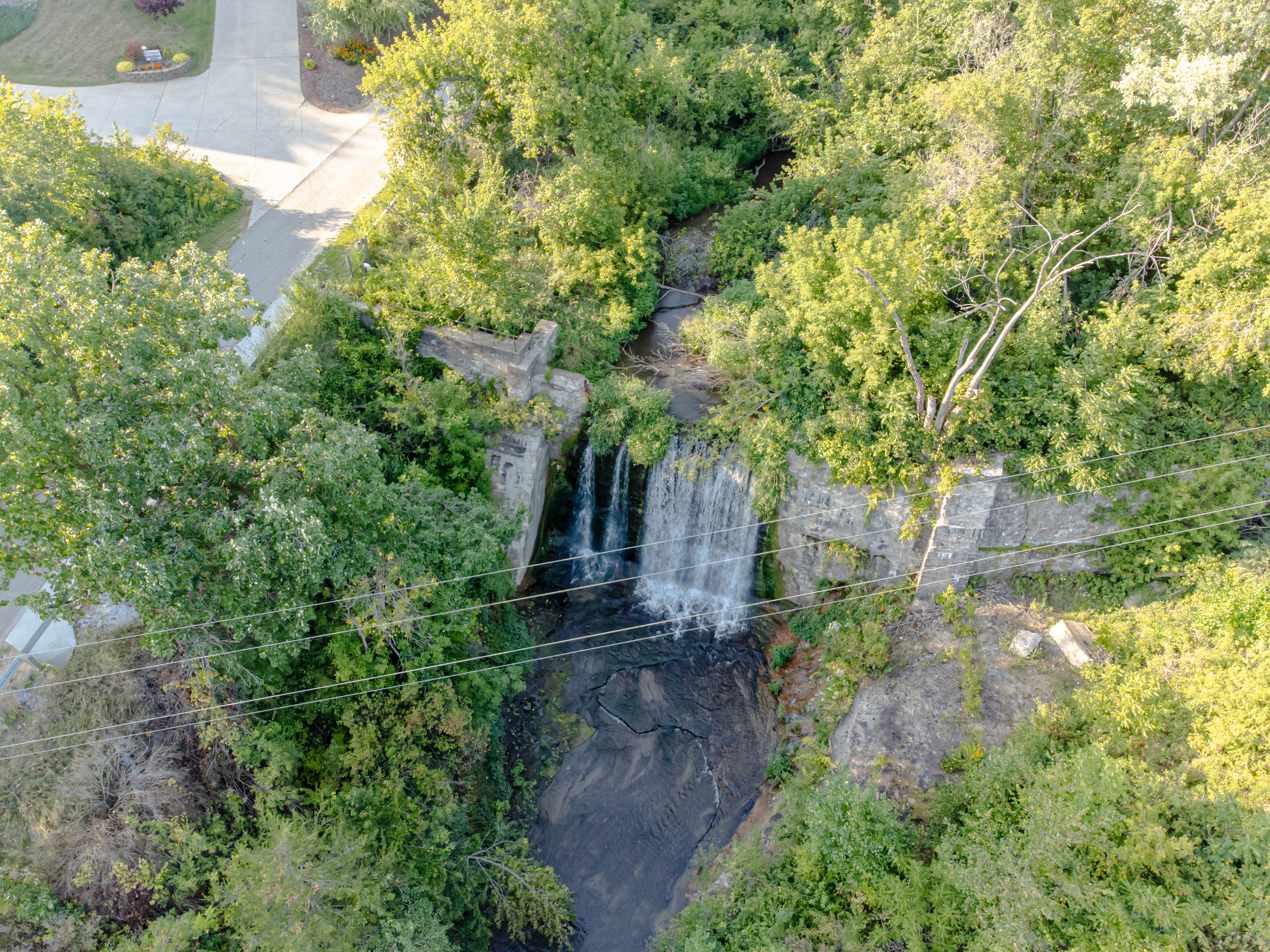
Mill Creek Dam
