= Lincoln, Wisconsin =

Lincoln is the name of some places in the U.S. state of Wisconsin:

- Lincoln, Adams County, Wisconsin, a town
- Lincoln, Bayfield County, Wisconsin, a town
- Lincoln, Buffalo County, Wisconsin, a town
- Lincoln, Burnett County, Wisconsin, a town
- Lincoln, Eau Claire County, Wisconsin, a town
- Lincoln, Forest County, Wisconsin, a town
- Lincoln, Kewaunee County, Wisconsin, a town
  - Lincoln (community), Wisconsin, an unincorporated community in the Kewaunee County town
- Lincoln, Monroe County, Wisconsin, a town
- Lincoln, Polk County, Wisconsin, a town
- Lincoln, Trempealeau County, Wisconsin, a town
- Lincoln, Vilas County, Wisconsin, a town
- Lincoln, Wood County, Wisconsin, a town
