= Brussels (community), Wisconsin =

Brussels, Wisconsin
- Unincorporated community
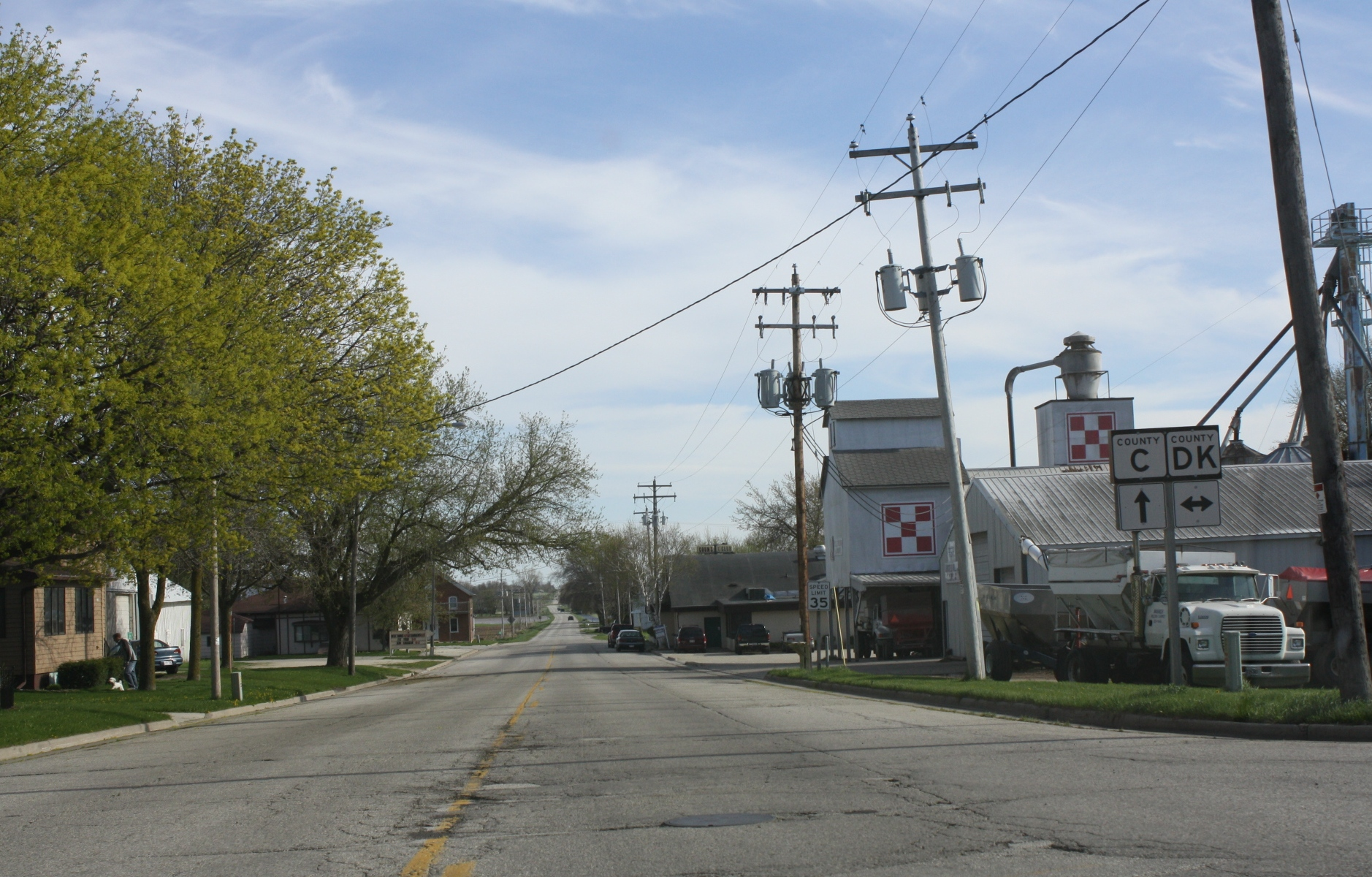
- Looking south in Brussels

- Location within Wisconsin Location within the United States
- Coordinates: 44°44′10″N 87°37′15″W
- Country: United States
- State: Wisconsin
- County: Door
- Town: Brussels
- Elevation: 764 ft (233 m)
- Time zone: UTC-6 (Central (CST))
  - Summer (DST): UTC-5 (CDT)
- ZIP code: 54204
- Area code: 920
- GNIS feature ID: 1562313

Brussels is an unincorporated community located, in the town of Brussels, in Door County, Wisconsin, United States. Brussels is 14 miles (23 km) southwest of Sturgeon Bay. Brussels uses the ZIP code of 54204.

As of the 2010 census, there were 1,135 people, 403 households, and 303 families living in the town. Current 2017 population is 1134.

== Images ==
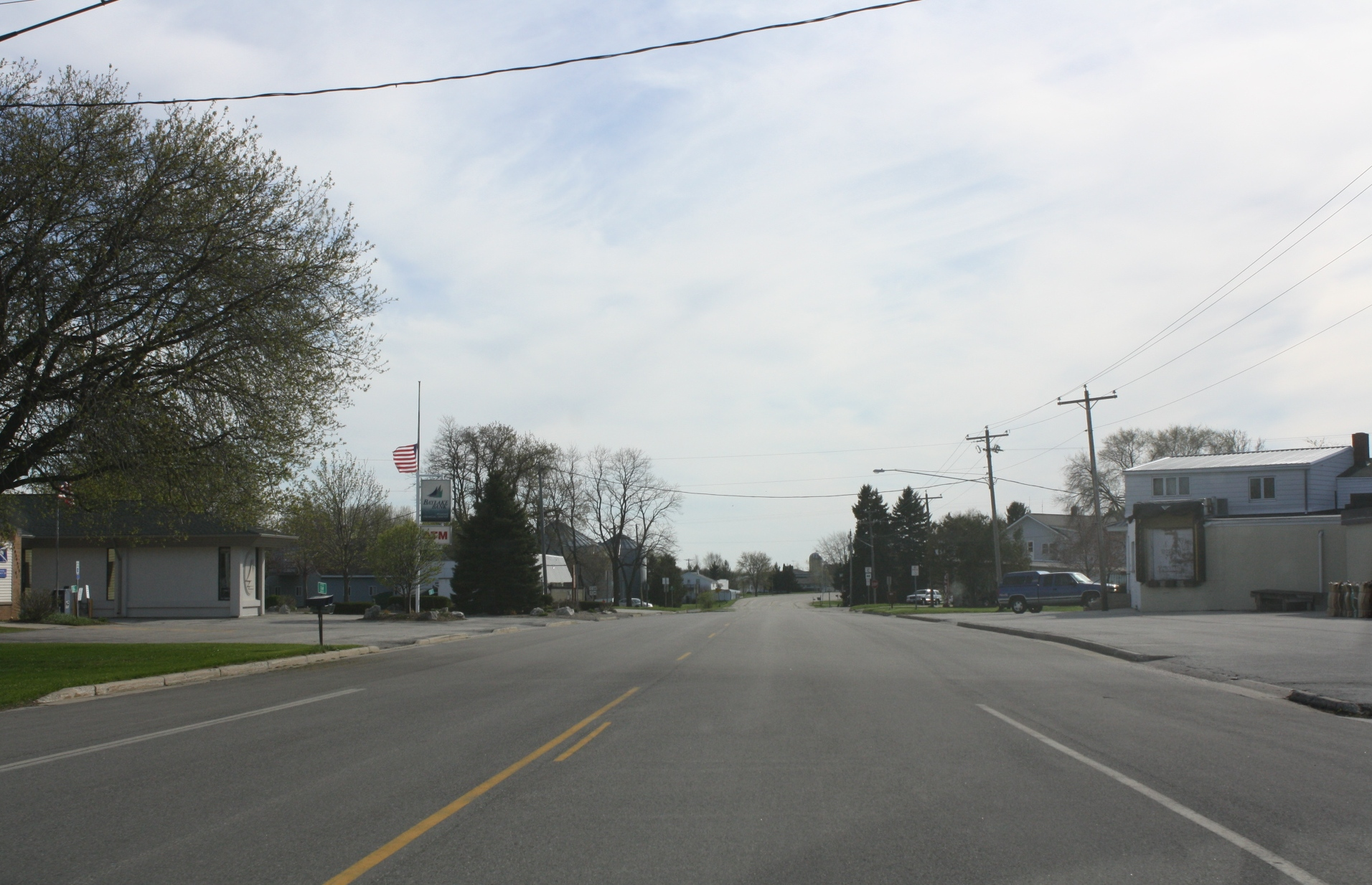
Looking west in Brussels

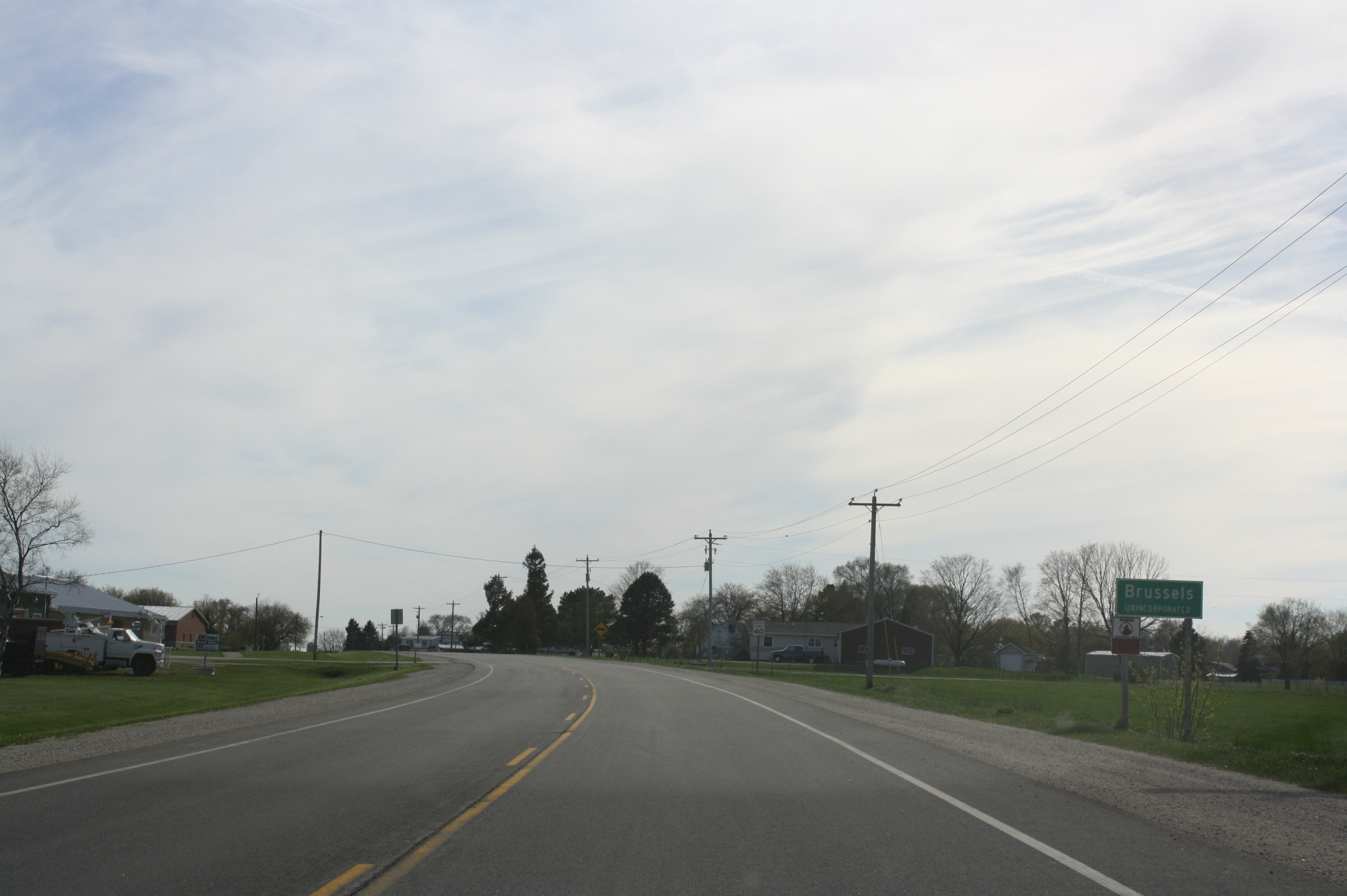
Looking west at the sign for Brussels

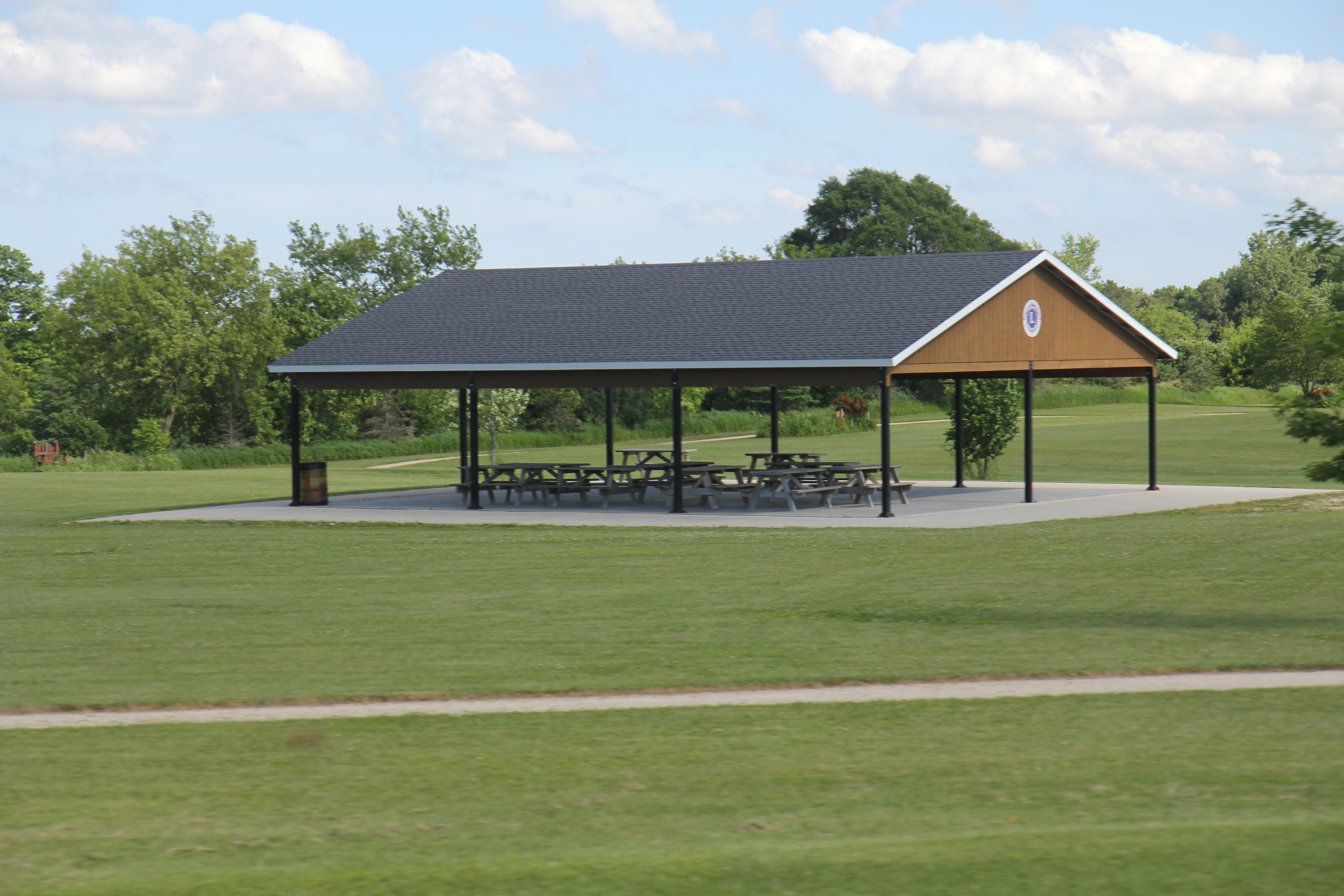
Town park

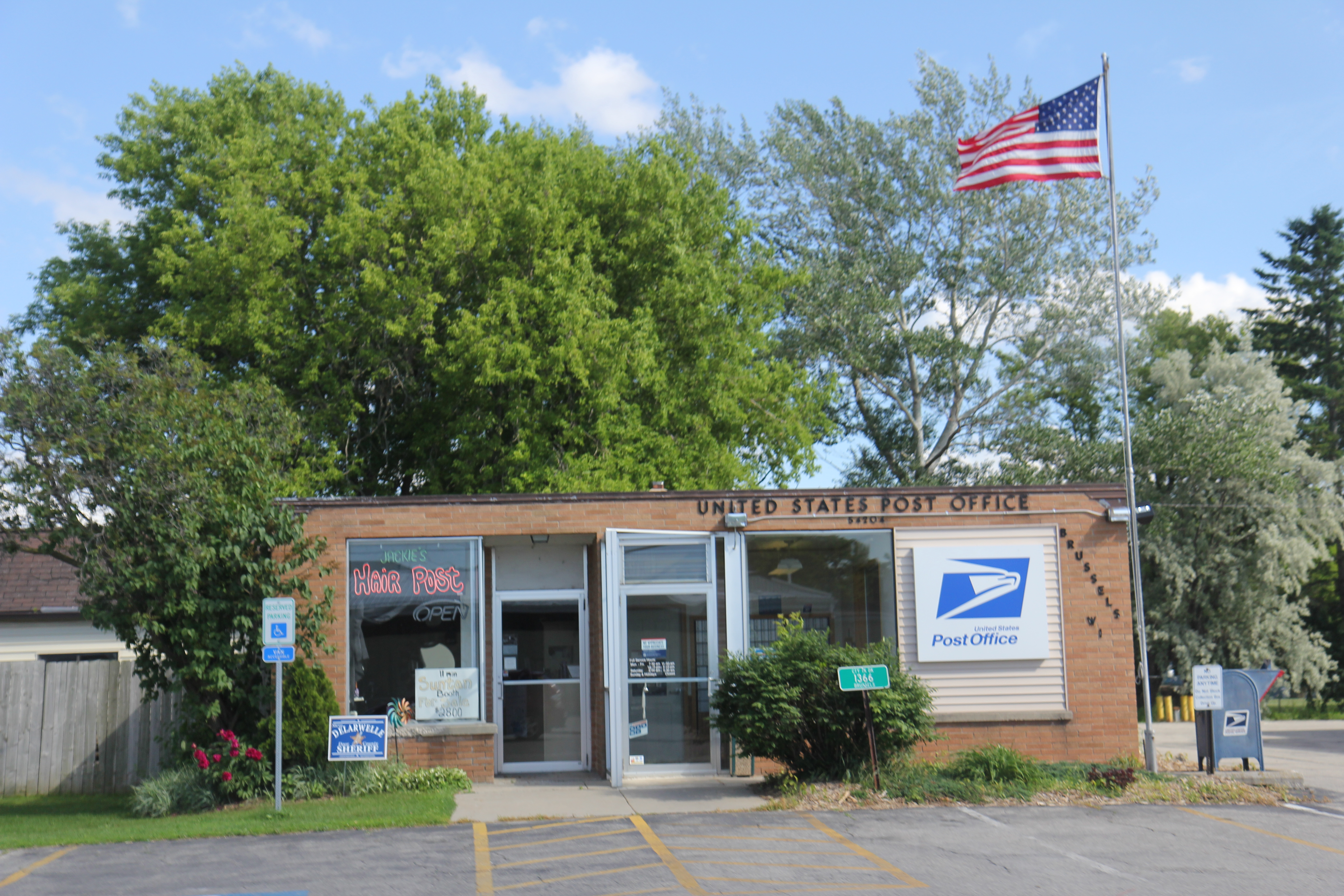
The post office
