= Rosiere, Wisconsin =

- Unincorporated community
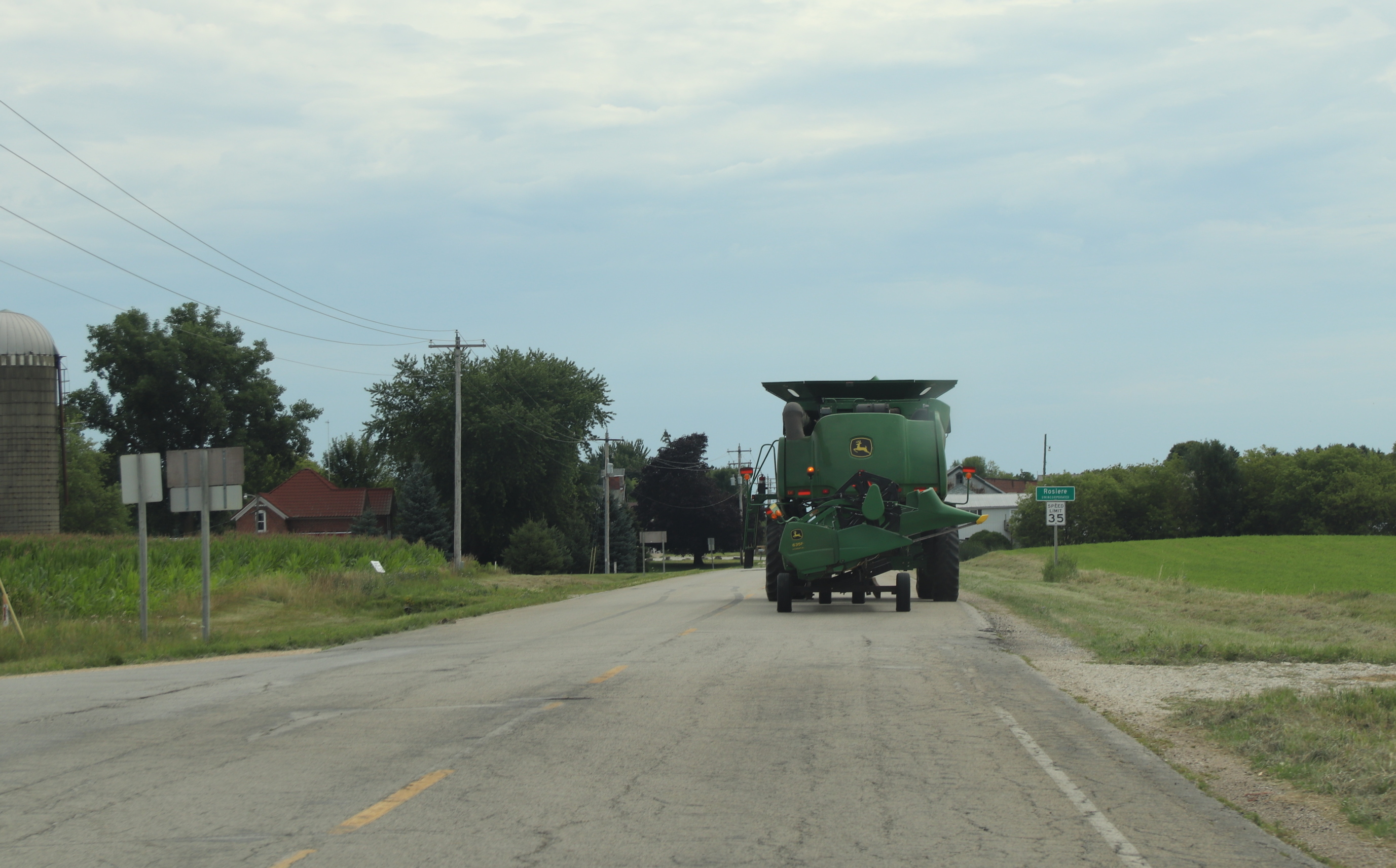
- Rosiere Sign in 2020

- Location within Wisconsin Location within the United States
- Coordinates: 44°40′32″N 87°36′43″W
- Country: United States
- State: Wisconsin
- Counties: Kewaunee, Door
- Towns: Lincoln, Brussels
- Elevation: 814 ft (248 m)
- Time zone: UTC-6 (Central (CST))
  - Summer (DST): UTC-5 (CDT)
- Area code: 920
- GNIS feature ID: 1572620

Rosiere (/roʊˈzɛər/ roh-ZAIR) is an unincorporated community on the border of Kewaunee and Door Counties in Wisconsin, United States, in the towns of Lincoln, and Brussels.

== History ==
Rosiere was probably named by settlers from Rosière, Belgium. The post office in Rosiere was established in 1871, and Charles Rubens (1827–1903) served as the first postmaster.

== Wind farm ==
In 1999, Rosiere became the site of the Rosiere Wind Farm, a wind power site that sits on 30.5 acres (12.3 ha) near the community. At its completion, the plant was the largest wind farm in the eastern United States and was built on land leased from landowners in the area.

Although the layout was intended to minimize the sound of the blades, two neighbors sued in 2004 over negative effects from the turbines. Other complaints about the turbines included shadows, poor TV reception, traffic, and the sickening of cows. Some health effects were thought to be a result of stray voltage. The turbines have not hurt residential property values. Each turbine kills an estimated 1.29 birds and 4.26 bats per year based on 1998-2001 data.

== Massart Farmstead ==
In 1984, the Massart Farmstead buildings were moved from Rosiere to Heritage Hill State Park in Allouez near Green Bay, Wisconsin. Seven buildings were relocated.

== Gallery ==
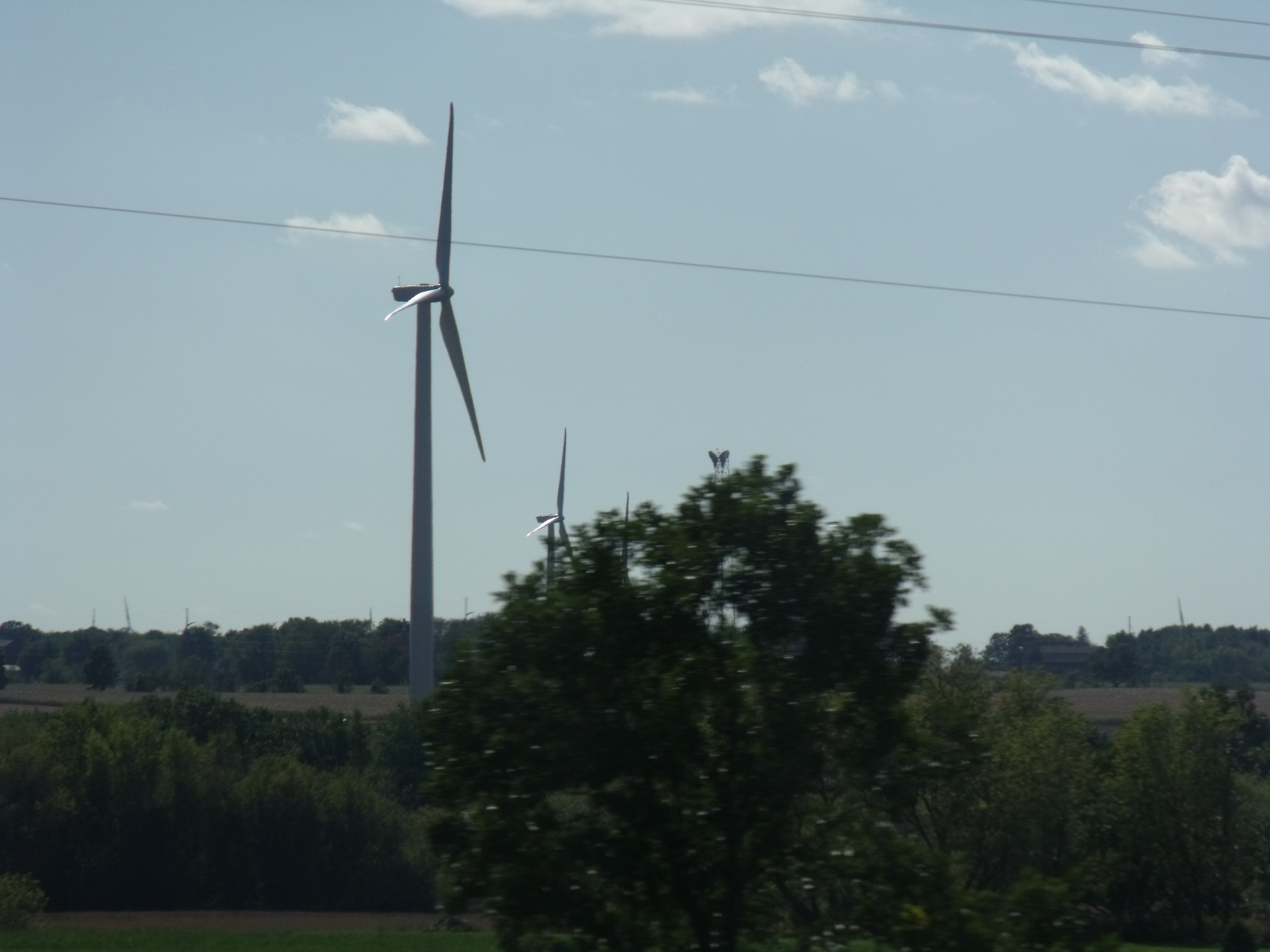
Rosière Wind Farm

== See also ==
- Garden Township, Michigan on the Garden Peninsula, site of the Garden Wind Farm
