= Baird Law Office =

- U.S. National Register of Historic Places
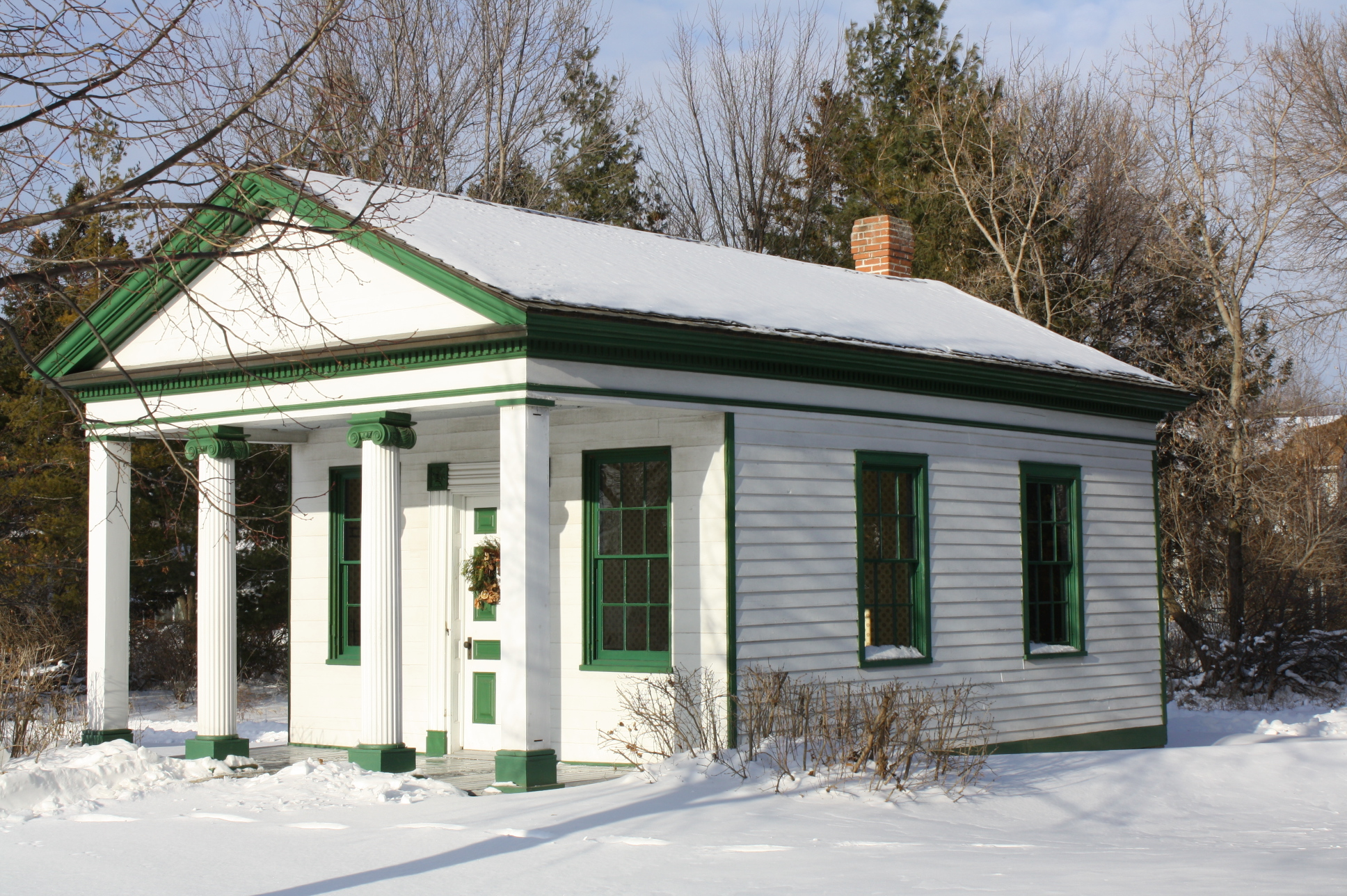

- Location within Wisconsin Location within the United States
- Location: Heritage Hill State Park, 2640 South Webster Avenue, Green Bay, Wisconsin
- Coordinates: 44°28′26″N 88°1′49″W
- Area: 4 acres (1.6 ha)
- Built: 1831
- Architectural style: Greek Revival, Ionic
- NRHP reference No.: 70000025
- Added to NRHP: October 15, 1970

The Baird Law Office in Green Bay, Wisconsin was built in the 1830s in Greek Revival style, which was then popular as one of America's first architectural styles that explicitly rejected British practices. The small one-story building measures just 16 x 30 feet (9.1 m) in size and served historically as a professional building.

A plaque from 1964 explains that it was built as a law office for Henry S. Baird ("Father of the Wisconsin Bar") in the early 1830s, then later used as a residence, and it was restored and moved to its then-current site in 1960.

Other sources state that it was instead used first by owner Samuel Beall as a land office and his residence, and was purchased a few years later by Baird: "Henry S. Baird was an influential figure in local and state history. He found architecture befitting his stature when he purchased what became his namesake in 1841."

The building was listed, for its architecture, on the National Register of Historic Places in 1970. The listing is for a 4-acre (1.6 ha) area with just the one contributing building and no other structures.

According to the National Register's database, the building was built in 1831. According to the historical park, the building was built in 1835.

The Heritage Park states that the building was constructed by Samuel Beall, in 1835, "at the corner of Main and Monroe Streets", in Green Bay and "used as a land office and Beall's residence." It was moved several times, in fact, before being moved to Heritage Hill, in Allouez, in 1975.

It is now located within what is now Heritage Hill State Park. Also located in the park are several other NRHP-listed buildings.

According to Nick Backhaus, a restoration supervisor at Heritage Hill, the 16 x 30-foot (9.1 m) building might have "survived because of its unique architecture, and people identified that it was unique." He noted that "The architecture is Greek Revival, a style popular in the 1800s, though often expressed on much larger buildings," Backhaus said. "Many prosperous Americans believed that ancient Greece represented the spirit of democracy."

Architectural details include a portico with four columns, the center two having Ionic capitals and being round fluted. The outer two, without capitals, are square. The pediment has a cedar frieze board and dentils.

== See also ==
- List of the oldest buildings in Wisconsin
