= Gregorville, Wisconsin =

- Unincorporated community
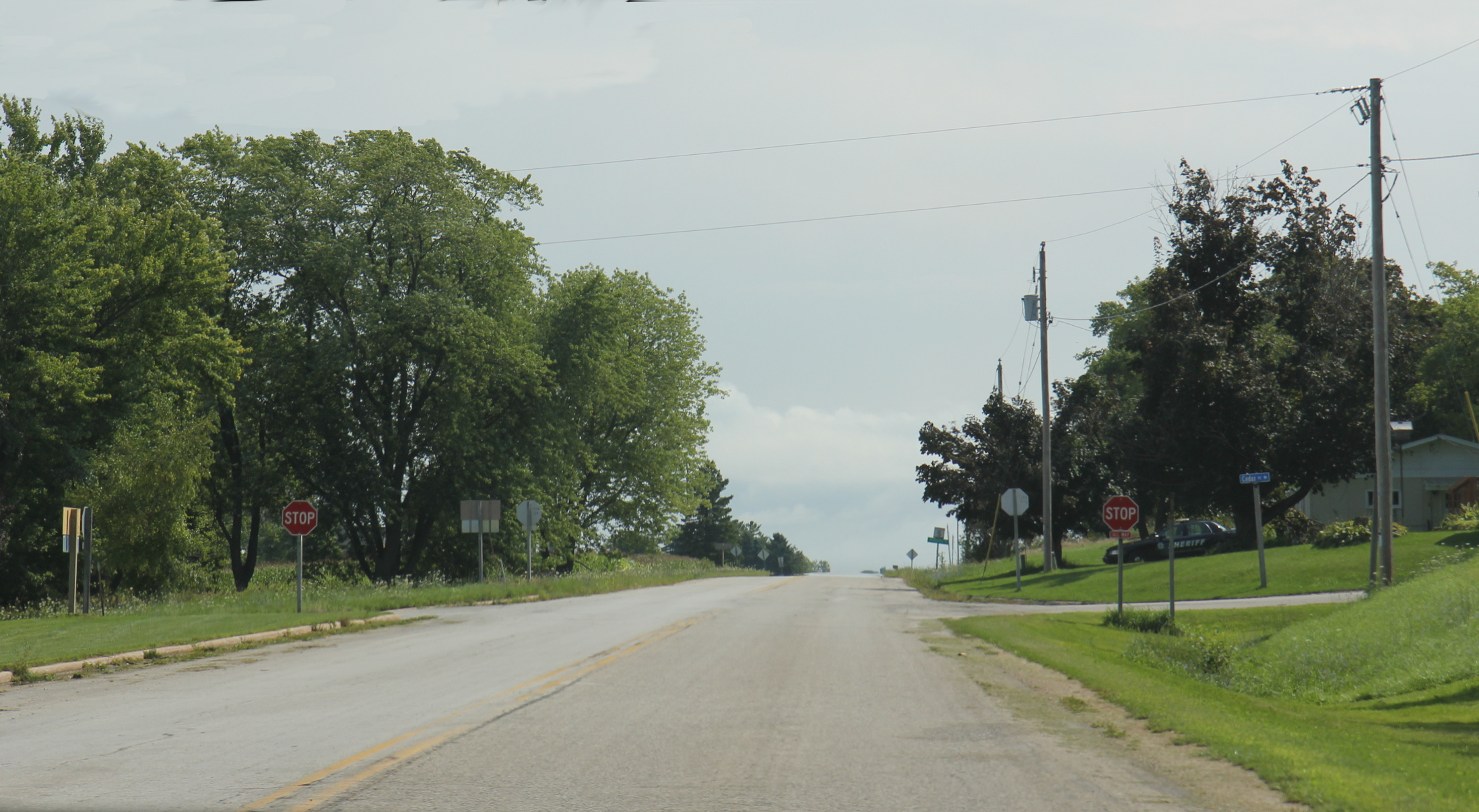
- Looking east at the intersection in Gregorville

- Location within Wisconsin Location within the United States
- Coordinates: 44°37′06″N 87°32′47″W
- Country: United States
- State: Wisconsin
- County: Kewaunee
- Town: Lincoln
- Elevation: 712 ft (217 m)
- Time zone: UTC-6 (Central (CST))
  - Summer (DST): UTC-5 (CDT)
- Area code: 920
- GNIS feature ID: 1577621

Gregorville is an unincorporated community in the town of Lincoln, Kewaunee County, Wisconsin, United States. It sits at the junction of County Highways P and S, 5.5 miles (8.9 km) west of Algoma. The community was most likely named for Frank Gregor, a Bohemian-born farmer who was Wisconsin's next-to-last surviving Civil War veteran when he died in 1937. The post office was established in 1899, with Wenzel Zlab as the first postmaster.

== Gallery ==
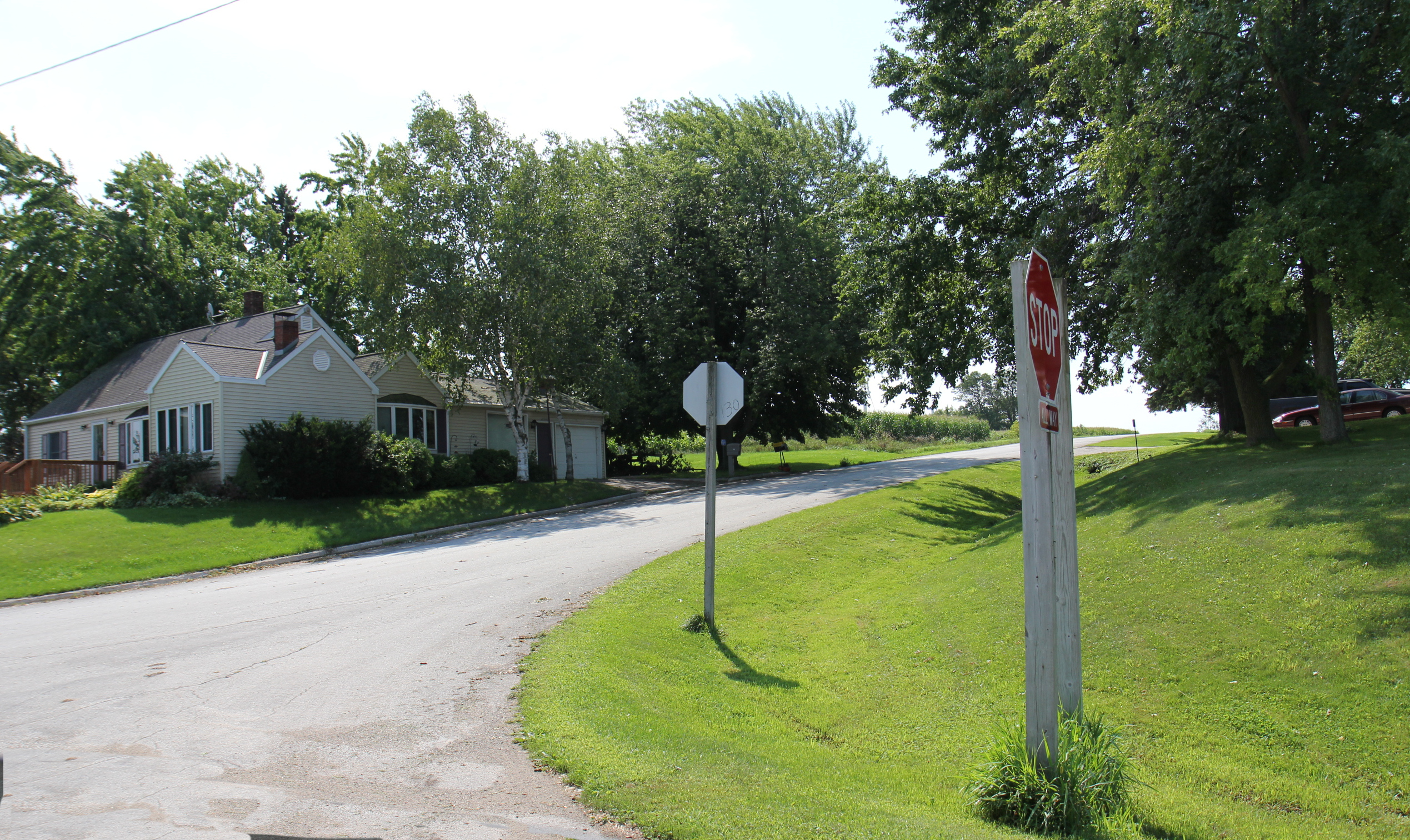
Looking south in Gregorville

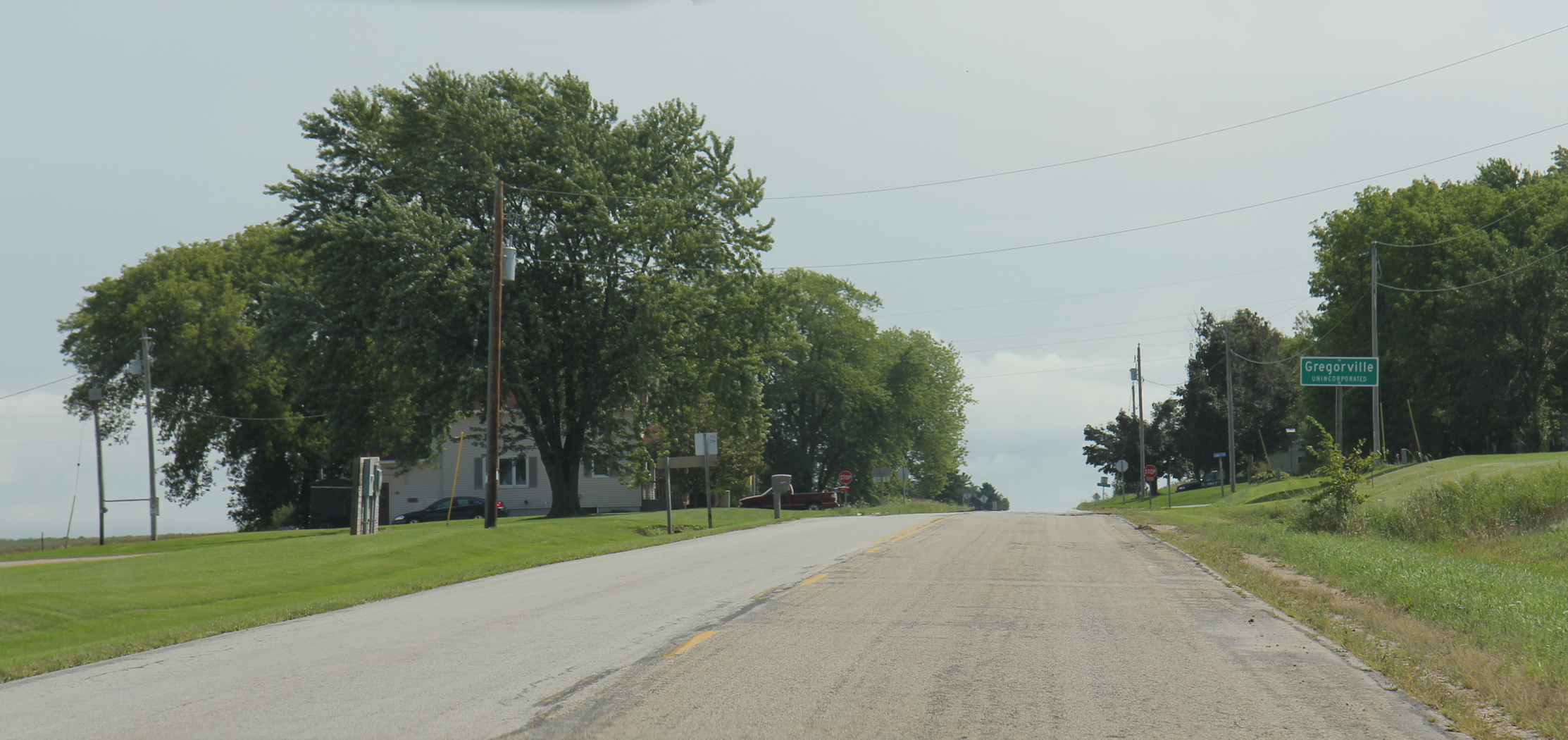
The sign for Gregorville

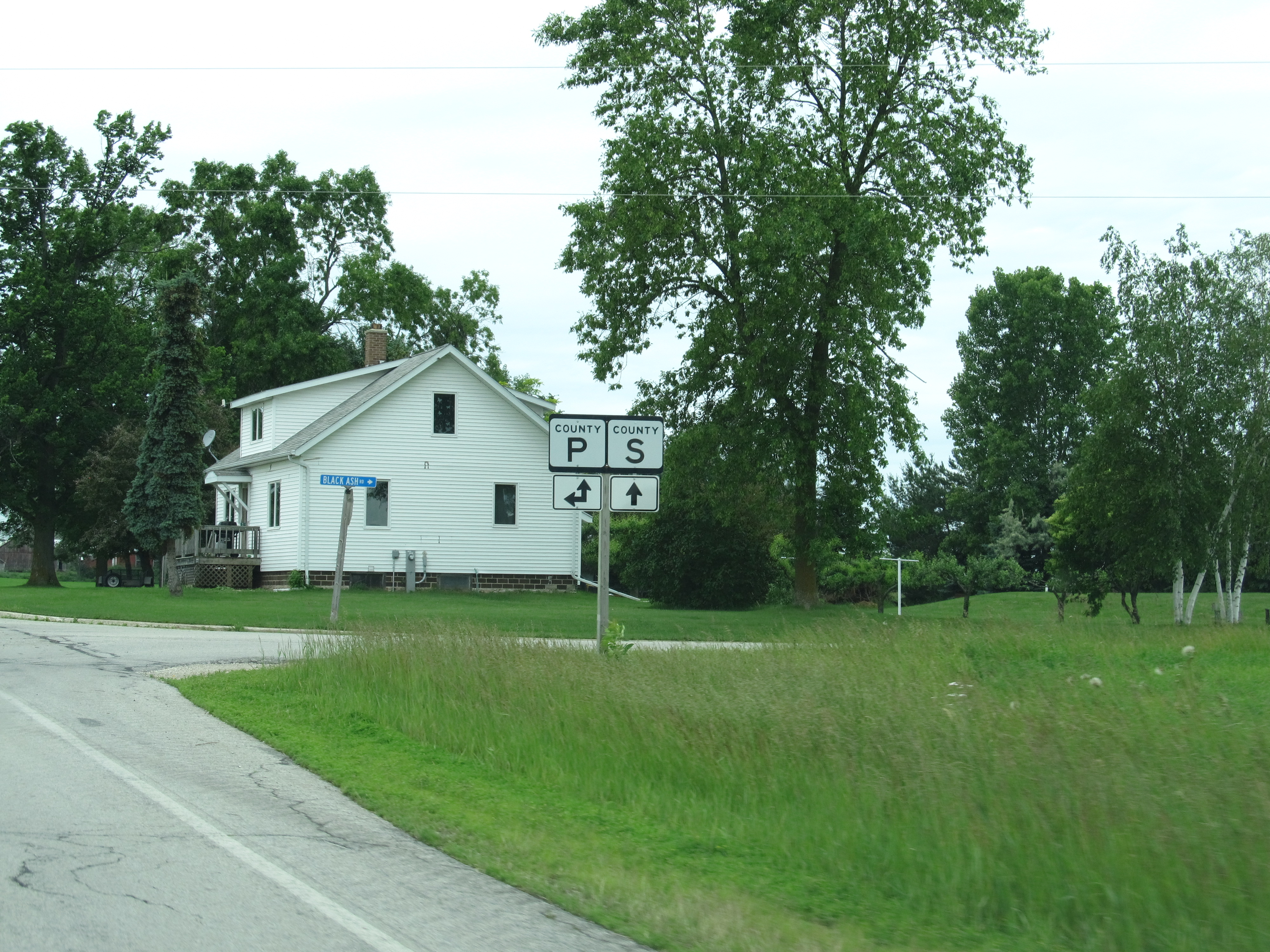
Sign for the junction of county trunks P and S
