= Brussels, Wisconsin =

- Town
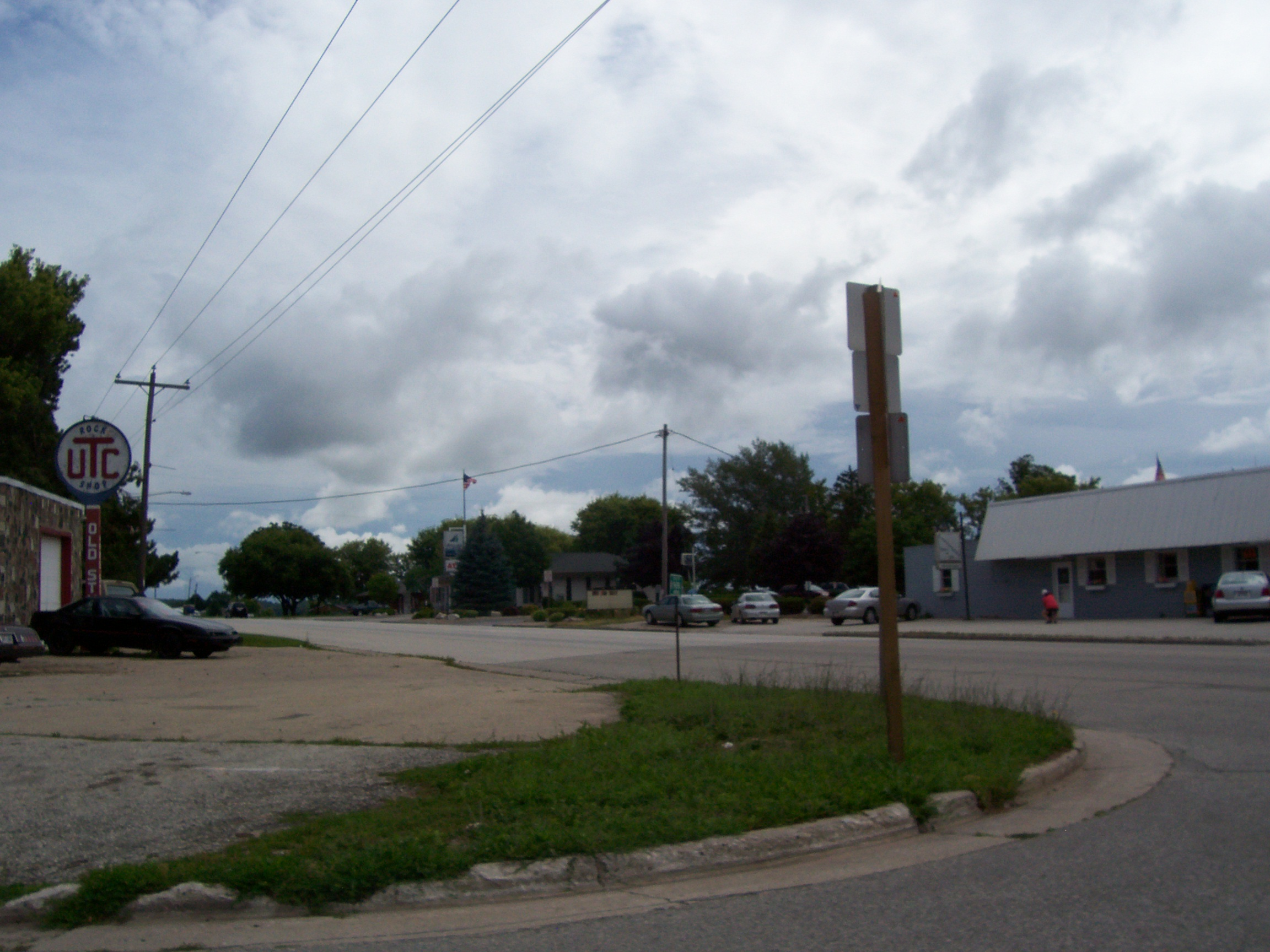
- Looking east at Brussels on WIS 57

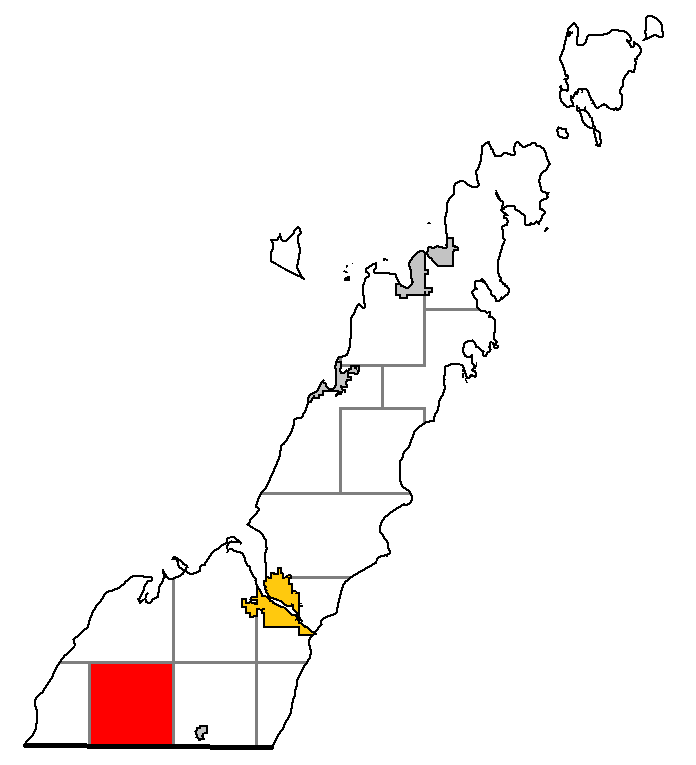
- Location of Brussels, within Door County
- Coordinates: 44°43′54″N 87°34′45″W
- Country: United States
- State: Wisconsin
- County: Door
- Named for: Brussels, Belgium

Area
  - Total: 36.1 sq mi (93.6 km^{2})
  - Land: 36.1 sq mi (93.6 km^{2})
  - Water: 0 sq mi (0.0 km^{2})
- Elevation: 720 ft (220 m)

Population (2020)
  - Total: 1,125
  - Density: 31.1/sq mi (12.0/km^{2})
- Time zone: UTC-6 (Central (CST))
  - Summer (DST): UTC-5 (CDT)
- Postal code: 54204
- Area code: 920
- FIPS code: 55-10700
- GNIS feature ID: 1582880
- Website: http://www.townofbrussels.com/

Brussels is a town in Door County, Wisconsin, United States. The population was 1,125 at the 2020 census. The unincorporated communities of Brussels, Misere, and Kolberg are located in the town. The unincorporated community of Rosiere is also located partially in the town.

== History ==
Brussels, a civil town in Door County, was created on November 12, 1858.

The largest Belgian-American settlement in the United States is located in portions of Brown, Kewaunee, and Door counties in Wisconsin, adjacent to the waters of Green Bay. Walloons settled the region in the 1850s and their descendants still constitute a high proportion of the population. A variety of elements attests to the Belgian-American presence: place names (Brussels, Namur, Rosiere, Luxemburg), the Walloon language, surnames, foods (booyah, trippe, and jutt), the Kermis harvest festival, and especially architecture. Many of the original wooden structures of the Belgian Americans were destroyed in a firestorm that swept across southern Door County in October 1871. A few stone houses made of local dolomite survived. More common are 1880s red brick houses, distinguished by modest size and gable-end, bull's-eye windows. Some houses have detached summer kitchens with bake ovens appended to the rear. And the Belgians, many of them devout Catholics, also erected small roadside votive chapels like those in their homeland.

=== Most Belgian-American towns ===
Brussels, Wisconsin is the third-most Belgian-American community in the United States, by proportion of residents.

1. Union, Door County, Wisconsin: 49%
2. Red River, Wisconsin (Kewaunee County): 47%
3. Brussels, Wisconsin (Door County): 36.4% (composed of "Brussels community" & "Namur Community")
4. Lincoln, Kewaunee County, Wisconsin: 35.4%
5. Green Bay (town), Wisconsin (Brown County): 31.8%

== Geography ==
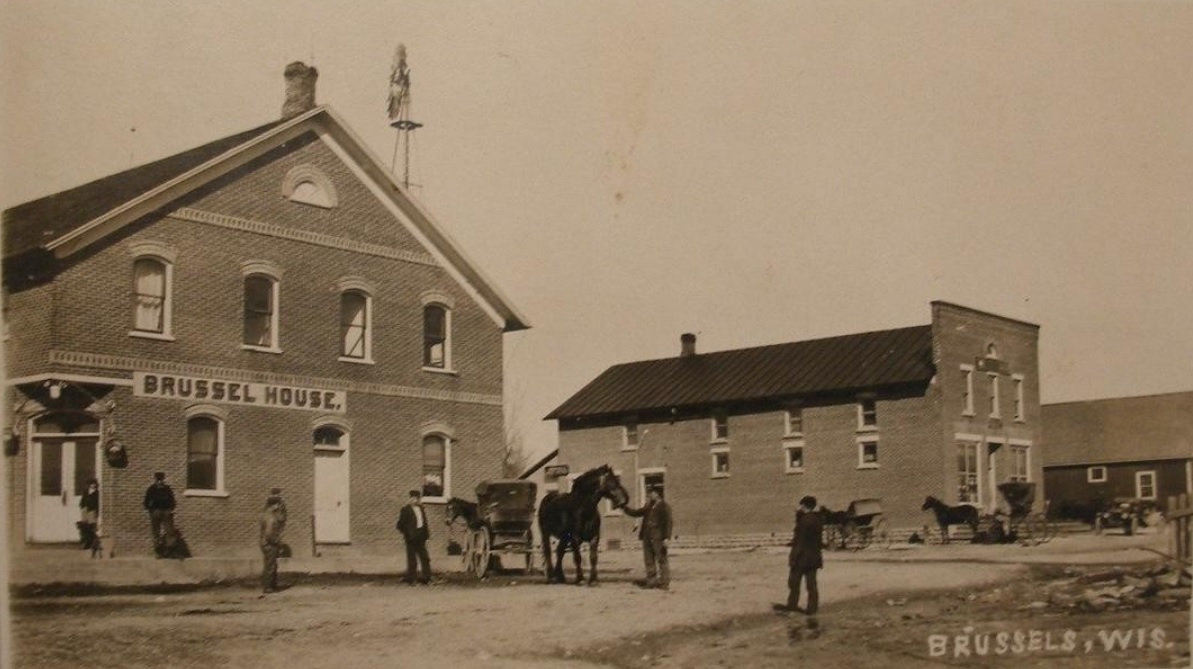
The Brussel House in Brussels; from a postcard dated as 1914

According to the United States Census Bureau, the town has a total area of 36.2 square miles (93.6 km^{2}), all land.

=== Brussels Hill ===
The 102 ft high Brussels Hill (44.75166°N 87.59093°W, elevation 851 feet) is the highest point in the county. It has been explained as the result of a meteorite impact. The hill is missing blocks of rock ripped off during glaciation. The broken rocks leave behind nearly horizontal and vertical rock surfaces along the pre-existing weaknesses (beds and joints) in the rock. This is considered a feature of glaciokarst geology.

== Demographics ==
=== 2000 ===
As of the census of 2000, there were 1,112 people, 403 households, and 303 families residing in the town. The population density was 30.8 people per square mile (11.9/km^{2}). There were 428 housing units at an average density of 11.8 per square mile (4.6/km^{2}). The racial makeup of the town was 97.93% White, 0.18% African American, 0.72% Native American, 0.81% Asian, 0.09% from other races, and 0.27% from two or more races. Hispanic or Latino of any race were 0.45% of the population.

There were 403 households, out of which 37.0% had children under the age of 18 living with them, 66.0% were married couples living together, 4.5% had a female householder with no husband present, and 24.8% were non-families. 19.6% of all households were made up of individuals, and 10.2% had someone living alone who was 65 years of age or older. The average household size was 2.76 and the average family size was 3.19.

In the town, the population was spread out, with 27.4% under the age of 18, 7.5% from 18 to 24, 30.8% from 25 to 44, 24.1% from 45 to 64, and 10.2% who were 65 years of age or older. The median age was 36 years. For every 100 females age 18 and over, there were 101.8 males.

The median income for a household in the town was $42,212, and the median income for a family was $45,341. Males had a median income of $30,000 versus $21,678 for females. The per capita income for the town was $16,871. About 4.3% of families and 6.5% of the population were below the poverty line, including 8.6% of those under age 18 and 9.9% of those age 65 or over.

=== 2010 ===
The census of 2010 revealed there were 1,136 people, 430 households, and 330 families residing within the town.

=== 2020 ===
As of the 2020 census, there were 1,125 people, 469 housing units, and 444 families in the town. The racial makeup was 94.2% White, 0.2% African American, 0.2% Native American, 0.2% Asian, 1.0% from some other race, and 4% from two or more races. Those of Hispanic or Latino origin made up 1.7% of the population.

The ancestry was 31.6% German, 4.5% Irish, 4.1% Polish, 3.9% Czech, 3.6% Italian, 3.4% French, 1.7% Norwegian, and 1.5% English.

The median age was 42.3 years old. A total of 16.4% of the population were 65 or older, with 11.0% between the ages of 65 and 74, 4.5% between the ages of 75 and 84, and 0.9% were 85 or older. A total of 24.8% of the population were under 18, with 8.8% under 5, 11.8% between 5 and 14, and 4.2% were between the ages of 15 and 17.

The median household income was $90,952, with families having $90,357, married couples having $92,321, and non-families having $55,833. A total of 9.2% of the population were in poverty, with 19.9% of people under 18, 4.8% of people between the ages of 18 and 64, and 9.3% of people 65 or older were in poverty.

== Notable people ==
- Erik Cordier, MLB and JL pitcher
- Jim Flanigan, NFL player
- Al Johnson, NFL player
- Ben Johnson, NFL player
