= Heritage Hill State Historical Park =

State park in Brown County, Wisconsin

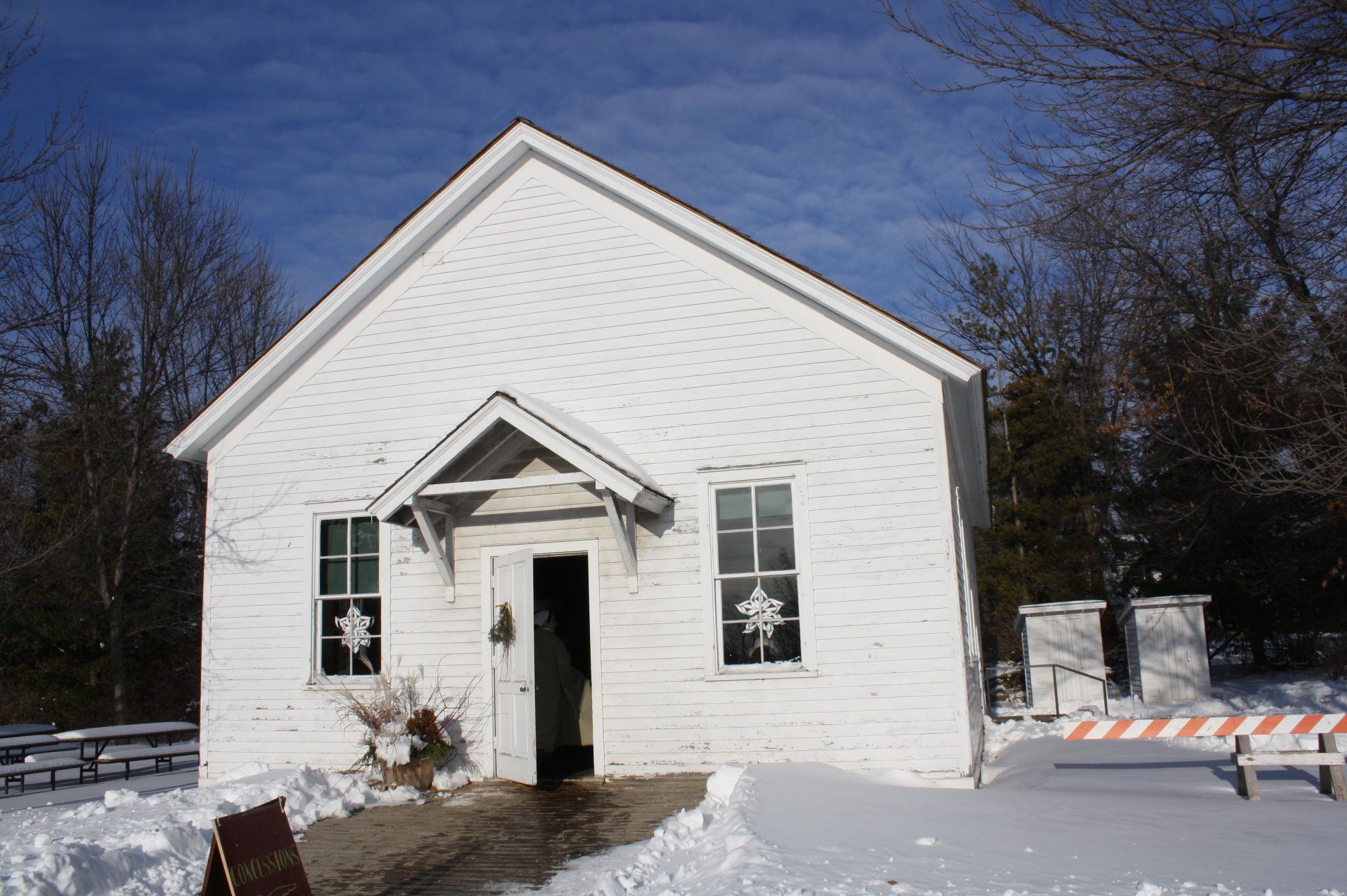
- Town hall

- Location within Wisconsin Location within the United States
- Interactive map of Heritage Hill State Historical Park
- Location: Brown County, Wisconsin, United States
- Coordinates: 44°28′26″N 88°1′59″W
- Area: 56 acres (23 ha)
- Established: 1973
- Administrator: Heritage Hill Corporation
- Website: Official website
- Wisconsin State Parks

Heritage Hill State Historical Park, is a 56-acre open-air museum located in Allouez, Wisconsin. A Wisconsin state park, the site is operated by a non-profit organization called the Heritage Hill Corporation in partnership with the Wisconsin Department of Natural Resources (DNR). The Heritage Hill Corporation operates, maintains and develops the park under terms of a lease with the DNR.

The site contains 26 historical and reproduction structures, mostly endangered historic buildings moved from other locations plus a few modern reconstructions. The Park is divided into four main areas: The Fur Trade, representing the first contact and fur trade industry in Wisconsin; The Growing Community, representing Green Bay's beginnings as a burgeoning metropolis in the late 19th century; The Belgian Farmstead, a representation of immigrant farming communities in the early 20th century; and Fort Howard, a reconstruction of how Fort Howard would have stood on the west side of Green Bay in the mid-19th century.

The park is open year-round with the majority of programming occurring May—September. The park is staffed by costumed guides called "interpreters".

== History ==
Previously the property was used as a prison farm with orchards tended by prison labor. Construction of highway 172 across the Fox River cut off the farm from the prison and the land fell under the jurisdiction of the Wisconsin Department of Natural Resources. In 1972 the DNR Natural Resources Board approved the establishment of a historical park. In a meeting held at Cotton House on July 18, 1972, the name Heritage Hill State Historical Park was chosen for the new historic site. At the same time a proposed development plan and an opening date of May 1, 1977, was selected. Over the next 20 years more than 25 buildings and 15 acres of land were added to the park. Preservation of the buildings and its artifacts and the interpretation of the history of Northeastern Wisconsin and its people remains a primary objective.

== Collections ==
Heritage Hill has more than 9,000 artifacts in its collection, mostly displayed in the buildings. Some of this collection is on loan from the Green Bay-De Pere Antiquarians, Brown County Historical Society, and Wisconsin Historical Society. The collection includes original artwork, books, clothing and furnishings dating from the 17th century to present. One unique piece displayed in the Tank Cottage is a hand-painted screen that the Tank family brought with them when they moved to Wisconsin in the late 1600s.

== Education Center ==
In 2006, the Betsy Hendrickson and Lucyanna Hitch Education Center was constructed. The center allows year-round use for education programs as well as business meetings, receptions, and parties. Education programs draw about 18,000 students per year. Students acquire a first hand look at how their early relatives worked and played. The programs meet benchmarks and standards in history and social studies.

== List of structures ==
Six of the site's structures are listed on the National Register of Historic Places. The park's Belgian Farmstead and Moravian church were listed on the National Register but were delisted upon being relocated. Seven other buildings in the park collection are modern replicas constructed on-site.

Structure name and location	Image	Original location	Original build date	Moved to park	Construction/style/notes
Allouez Town Hall; 44.475789°N 88.034823°W		2143 South Webster, Allouez	1912	1977	Wood framed with gable roof
Baird Law Office; 44.475627°N 88.034484°W		Main and Monroe; Green Bay	1835	1975	Greek Revival; Listed on the NRHP in 1970 (#70000025)
Bark Chapel; 44.474768°N 88.038225°W		Constructed on site	1981	N/A	Sapling framework with bark covering, replica of the first church in Wisconsin which was about 1 mile south of its location
Belgian Farmstead Farmhouse; 44.473360°N 88.032772°W		Rosiere	1872	1984	Log with brick veneer Listed on the NRHP as the Massart Farmstead (#80000143) but was removed in 1984.
Belgian Farmstead Dairy Barn; 44.473165°N 88.033144°W		Rosiere	1900	1984	Log/astylistic utilitarian
Belgian Farmstead Horse Barn; 44.473246°N 88.032473°W		Rosiere	1900	1984	Log/astylistic utilitarian
Belgian Farmstead chicken coop 44.473085°N 88.032492°W		Rosiere	1872	1984	Log/astylistic utilitarian
Belgian Farmstead pig house 44.473035°N 88.033194°W		Rosiere	1872	1984	Log/astylistic utilitarian
Belgian Farmstead outhouse 44.473329°N 88.033078°W		Rosiere	1872	1984	Astylistic utilitarian
Belgian Farmstead summer kitchen 44.473355°N 88.033008°W		Rosiere	1902	1984	Cut stone
Belgian Farmstead Roadside Chapel; 44.473507°N 88.032392°W		Duvall	1871	1983	Wood frame
Belgian Farmstead windmill 44.473244°N 88.033063°W		Duvall	1871	1983	Metal
Blacksmith Shop; 44.475521°N 88.034400°W		Danz and University; Green Bay	1850	1976	Wood frame
Cheese Factory; 44.473673°N 88.032846°W		Slovan	1894	1994	Wood framed
Cotton House; 44.473730°N 88.030345°W		Beaupre and Webster; Green Bay	1845	1938	Timber frame/Greek Revival; Listed on the NRHP in 1970 (#70000026)
Court House; 44.476039°N 88.037164°W		Door County	before 1814	1976	Full log with dovetail joints
Court House Monument; 44.475722°N 88.037461°W		At current location	1934		Stone and Mortar; This monument marks the site of the first court house in 1825
Fort Howard Guard Building; 44.473936°N 88.034135°W		Kellogg and Chestnut; Green Bay	1833 (Note: From letter from Engle to Quartermaster Jesup dated Sept 30, 1833)	2014	Half of this structure is a restoration of the original guard building from the fort and half is a replica. The reconstruction in 2014 at the park was done in conjunction with renovations to the Commanding Officer's Quarters.
Fort Howard Hospital; 44.474241°N 88.034359°W		Kellogg and Chestnut; Green Bay	1835	1975	Timber frame w/ clapboards/Federal; Listed on the NRHP in 1979 (#71001075); Hospital was originally constructed as an addition to the Ward Building but they were split when they were moved in the 1930s. The reconstruction in 1975 at the park recombined the buildings.
Fort Howard Ward Building; 44.474170°N 88.034197°W		Kellogg and Chestnut; Green Bay	1816	1975	Timber frame w/ clapboards/Federal; Listed on the NRHP in 1979 (#72001547)
Fort Howard Post School; 44.474337°N 88.033840°W		Constructed on site	1982	N/A	Federal
Fort Howard Company; Kitchen/Orderly Room; 44.474252°N 88.033650°W		Kellogg and Chestnut; Green Bay	1816	1975	Federal - timber frame Listed on the NRHP in 1979 (#72001548); This structure is listed on the NRHP as Fort Howard Officer’s Quarters. The park currently interprets this building as the Kitchen/Orderly room.
Fort Howard Officer's Quarters; 44.473917°N 88.033696°W		Constructed on site	1982	N/A	Federal
Franklin Hose Company; 44.474882°N 88.033840°W		Main and Irwin; Green Bay	1870	1975	Wood frame
Fur Trader's Cabin; 44.475220°N 88.038091°W		739 Adams St; Green Bay	1810	1975	Pièce-sur-pièce à coulisse
Maple Sugaring House; 44.475621°N 88.037581°W		Constructed on site	1981	N/A	Log
Moravian Church; 44.474732°N 88.032199°W		Moravian St; Green Bay	1842	1980	Timber framed Gothic Revival; Listed on the NRHP in 1972 as the East Moravian Church (#72001588) but later delisted in 1983.
Print Shop; 44.475458°N 88.034302°W		Constructed on site	1976	N/A	Wood framed
Tank Cottage; 44.475549°N 88.035927°W		On Fox River at 8th Street; Green Bay	1776	1976	Pièce-sur-pièce à coulisse Listed on the NRHP in 1970 (#70000028). This building is the oldest standing house in Wisconsin
Tank barn 44.475621°N 88.035521°W		Constructed on site		N/A	
Tomb of the Unknown Soldier; 44.473606°N 88.030844°W		At current location	1938	N/A	Dry-stacked limestone
Victorian Bandstand; 44.475200°N 88.034720°W		Constructed on site	1982	N/A	Victorian
YMCA Library; 44.475380°N 88.034056°W		810 Chestnut St; Green Bay	1872	1977	Wood framed w/ brick veneer/Greek Revival
Visitors center 44.473465°N 88.031448°W		Constructed on site		N/A	
Maintenance/restoration building 44.475031°N 88.032816°W		Constructed on site		N/A	

== See also ==
- National Register of Historic Places listings in Brown County, Wisconsin
- List of the oldest buildings in Wisconsin
