= Euren, Wisconsin =

- Unincorporated community
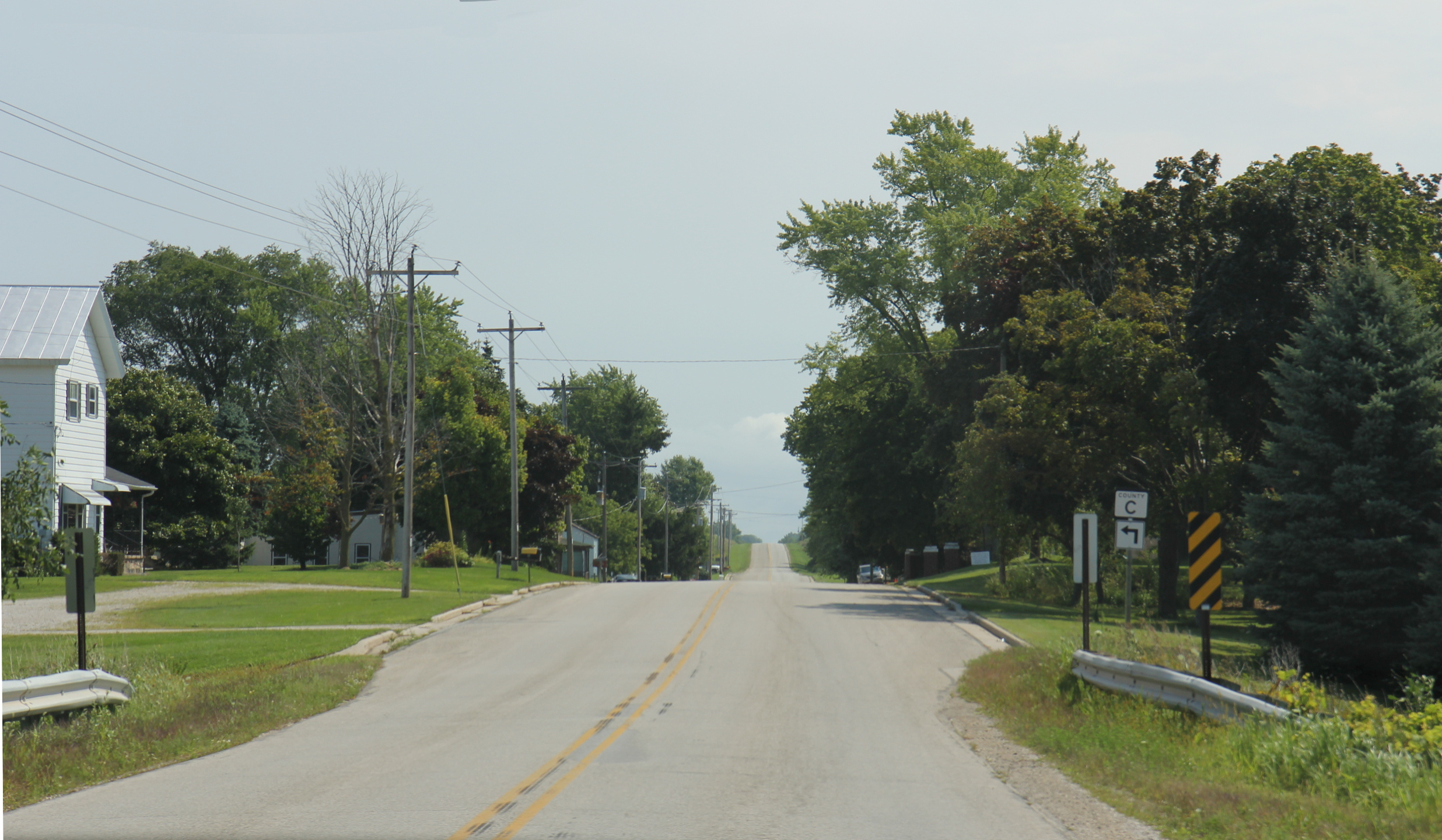
- Downtown Euren

- Location within Wisconsin Location within the United States
- Coordinates: 44°37′06″N 87°36′08″W
- Country: United States
- State: Wisconsin
- County: Kewaunee
- Town: Lincoln
- Elevation: 751 ft (229 m)
- Time zone: UTC-6 (Central (CST))
  - Summer (DST): UTC-5 (CDT)
- Area code: 920
- GNIS feature ID: 1564713

Euren (pronounced like "urine") is an unincorporated community in the town of Lincoln, Kewaunee County, Wisconsin, United States. It sits at the junction of County Highways C and S, 8 miles (13 km) west of Algoma.

It has been noted on lists of unusual place names because of its pronunciation being similar to the word "urine".

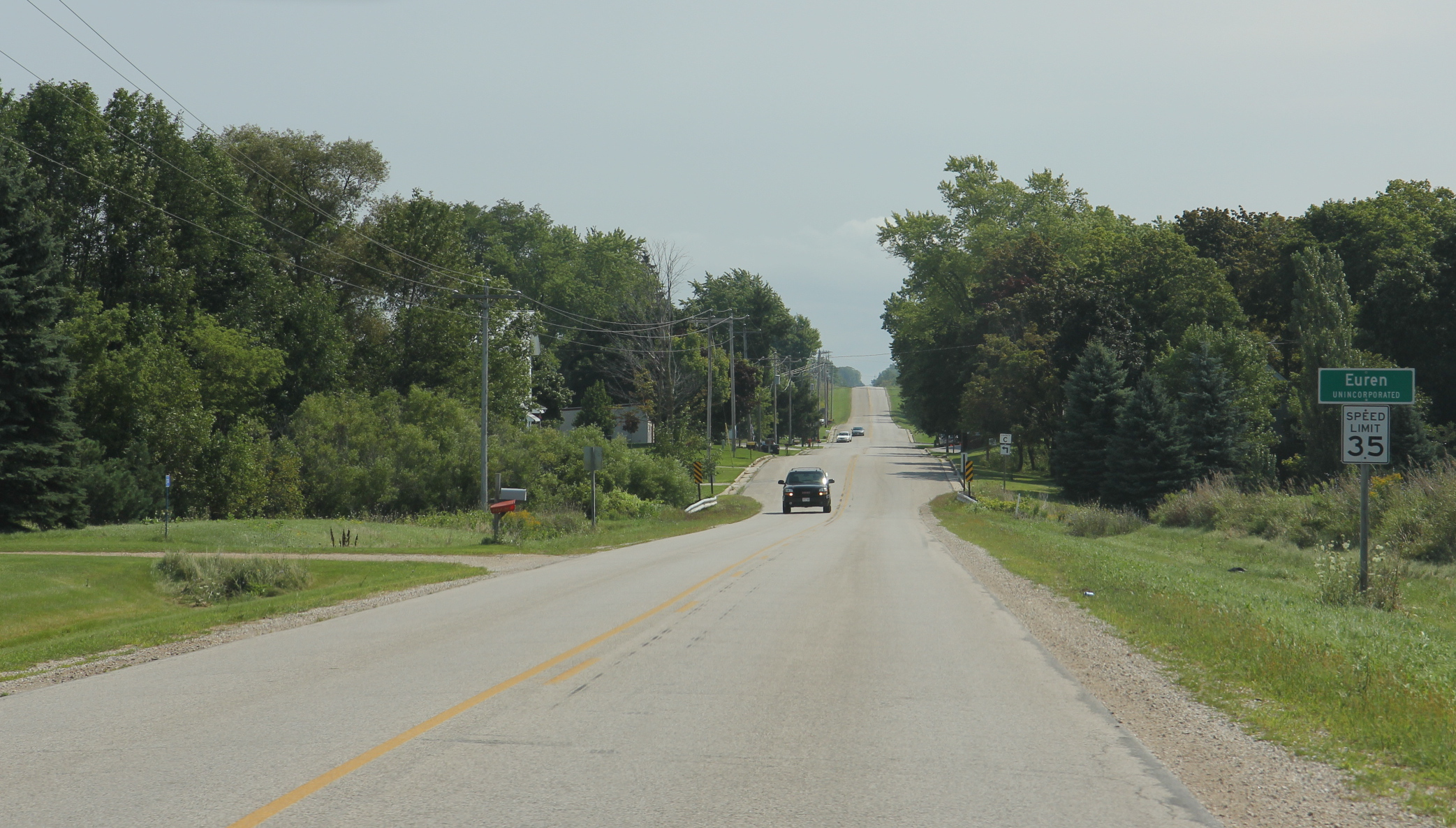
The sign for Euren

== History ==
Euren Is an old German settlement located In northern Kewaunee County within the boundaries of the Town of Lincoin along County Trunk S between Algoma and Dyckesville. Pronounced Oy-ren, It was settled and named by early German settlers called Bottkols who named their new home after a small village in Germany, today a district of Trier.
