= Massart Farmstead =

- Formerly listed on the U.S. National Register of Historic Places
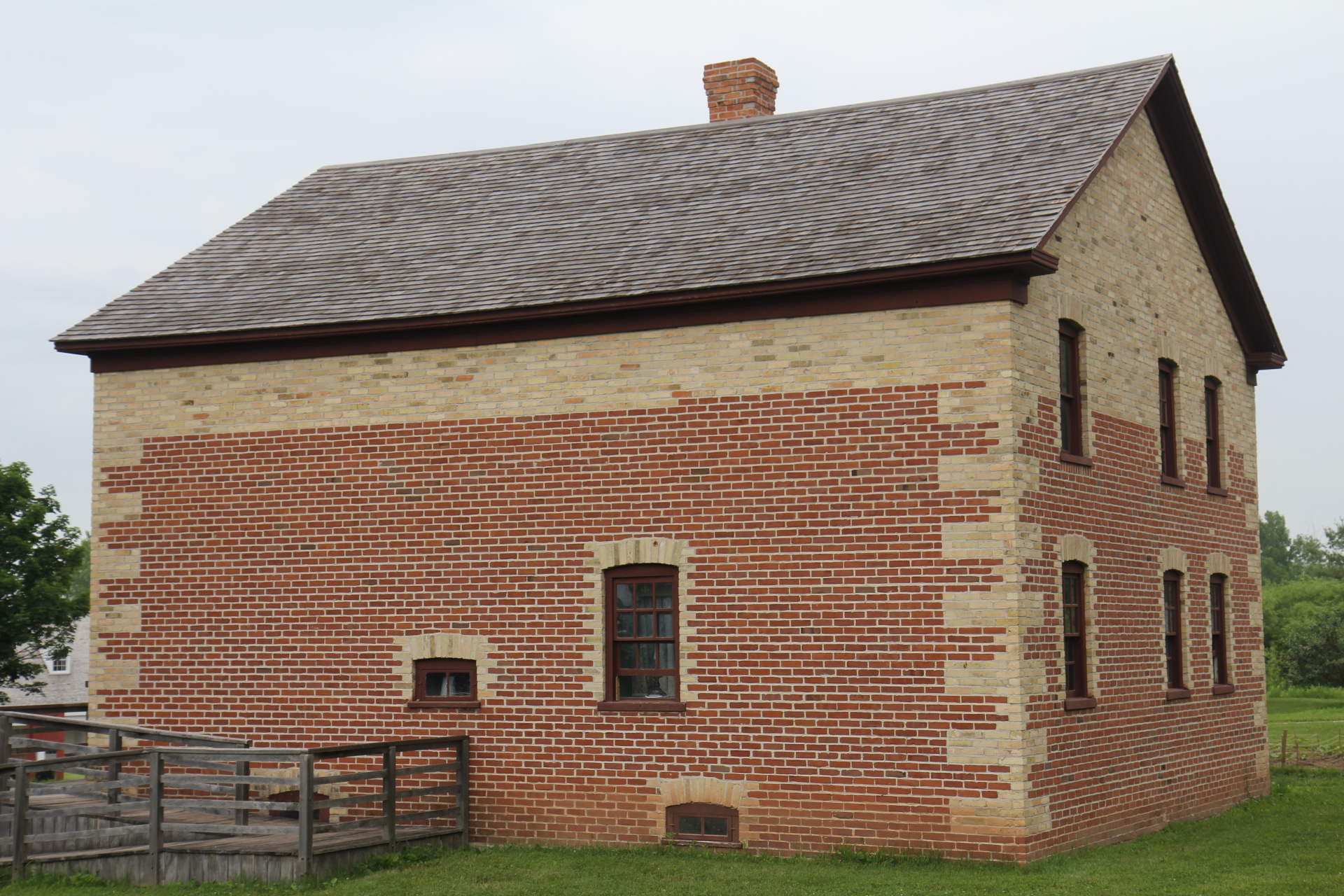
- Massart Farmstead House
- Location: Rosiere, Wisconsin
- NRHP reference No.: 80000143

Significant dates
- Added to NRHP: November 18, 1980
- Removed from NRHP: December 30, 1984

The Massart Farmstead was located in Rosiere, Wisconsin.

== History ==
The farmstead originally belonged to John Baptist and Theresa Massart. Over time, it was owned by a number of other families.

In 1980, the farmstead was added to the National Register of Historic Places. However, the farmhouse would be moved from its original site in Rosiere to the Heritage Hill State Park in Allouez, Wisconsin in 1984. The farmstead was removed from the register that year.
