= Misere, Wisconsin =

Misere (also spelled Misiere) is an unincorporated community in Door County, Wisconsin, United States, within the town of Brussels. The community is located at the intersection of Misere Road And County Highway J, 3 miles south of Brussels and 2 miles northeast of Rosiere.

It is located at 44.699 latitude and -87.600 longitude at an elevation of 820 feet above sea level.

Misiere was founded in the later part of the 1850s by settlers from Belgium. It attained it largest size and population in the late 1800s and early 1900s when it was the site of St Michael's Catholic Church and its cemetery, post office, two saloons, a dance and social hall, a general store, a cheese factory, blacksmith shop, and a number of personal residences and barns. Previous short lived names for the community include; Leccia, and Minor, as these were names of early post offices there.
