= Cotton House (Green Bay, Wisconsin) =

Historic house in Wisconsin, United States

- U.S. National Register of Historic Places
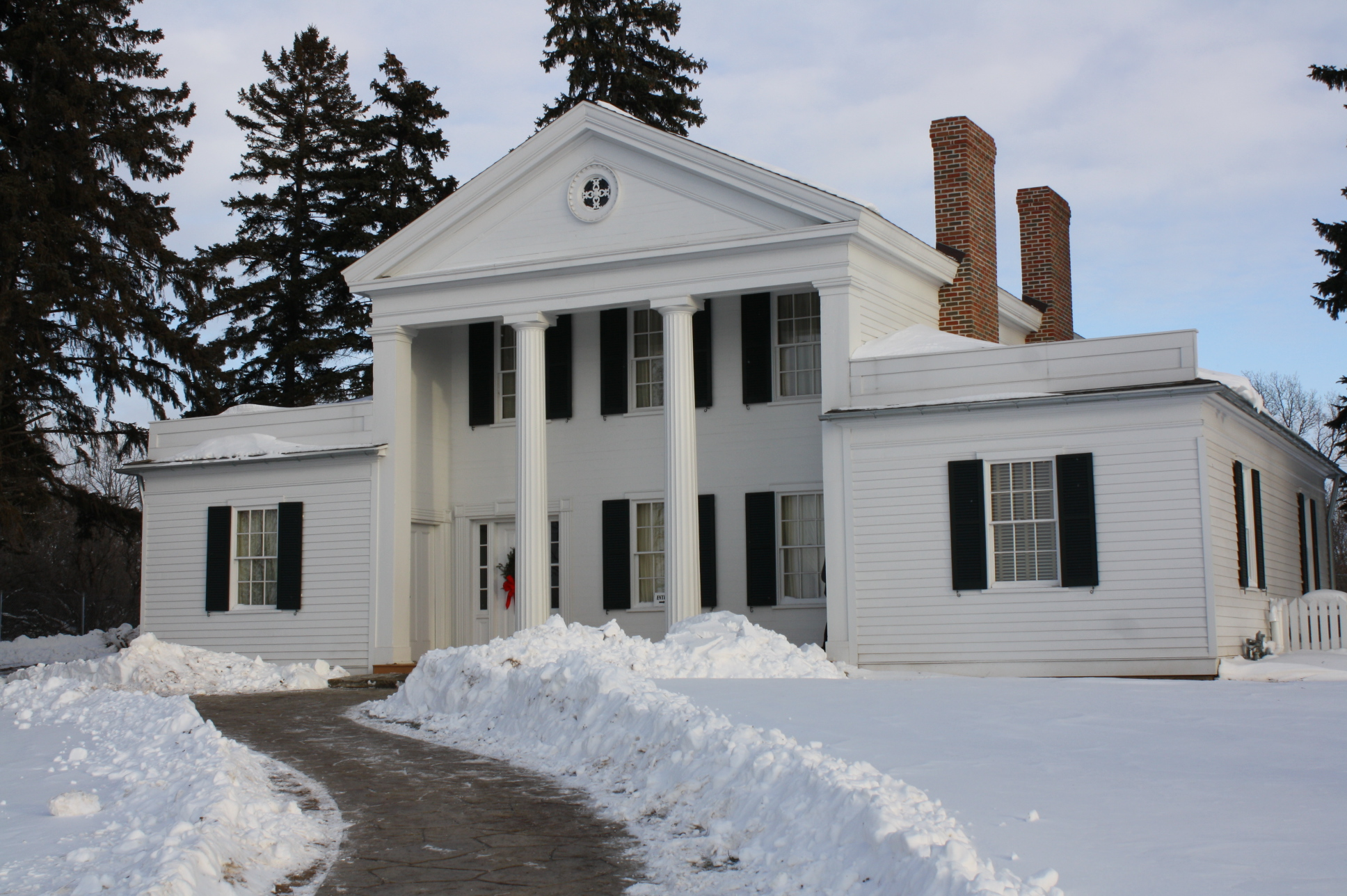

- Location within Wisconsin Location within the United States
- Location: 2640 South Webster Ave. Green Bay, Wisconsin
- Coordinates: 44°28′26″N 88°1′58″W
- Area: 4.0 acres (1.6 ha)
- Built: c. 1840
- Architect: Judge Joseph Penn Arndt
- Architectural style: Greek Revival
- NRHP reference No.: 70000026
- Added to NRHP: April 28, 1970

The Cotton House is a historic house located at 2640 South Webster Avenue within the Heritage Hill State Historical Park in Green Bay, Wisconsin. It was added to the National Register of Historic Places for its architectural significance on April 28, 1970.

== Description and history ==
The Cotton House was built right around 1840, and was originally located at the corner of Beaupre and Webster Avenue. It was built by Judge Joseph Penn Arndt for John Cotton, whose family stayed in the house until 1893 when it was sold to J. W. Woodruff. Woodruff lived there until 1896, when he sold it to the Roman Catholic Diocese of Green Bay, who used it as an orphanage until 1933. In 1938, the Brown County Historical Society began moving the house to its current location. The house has served as a museum since 1941.
