= Kolberg, Wisconsin =

- Unincorporated community
- Location within the state of Wisconsin
- Coordinates: 44°43′09″N 87°32′56″W
- Country: United States
- State: Wisconsin
- County: Door
- Town: Brussels
- Time zone: UTC-6 (Central (CST))
  - Summer (DST): UTC-5 (CDT)
- Area code: 920
- GNIS feature ID: 1567608

Kolberg (/ˈkoʊlbərɡ/ COAL-bərg) is an unincorporated community in the town of Brussels, in southern Door County, Wisconsin, United States. County Road D connects the community to Forestville and to Brussels. Kolberg came to be in 1893 when Conrad Guth built his store and creamery on the corner where the present creamery now stands. A post office was opened in 1895 by Conrad Guth and closed in 1907, originally in the first store building but moved across the street when the new store was built.

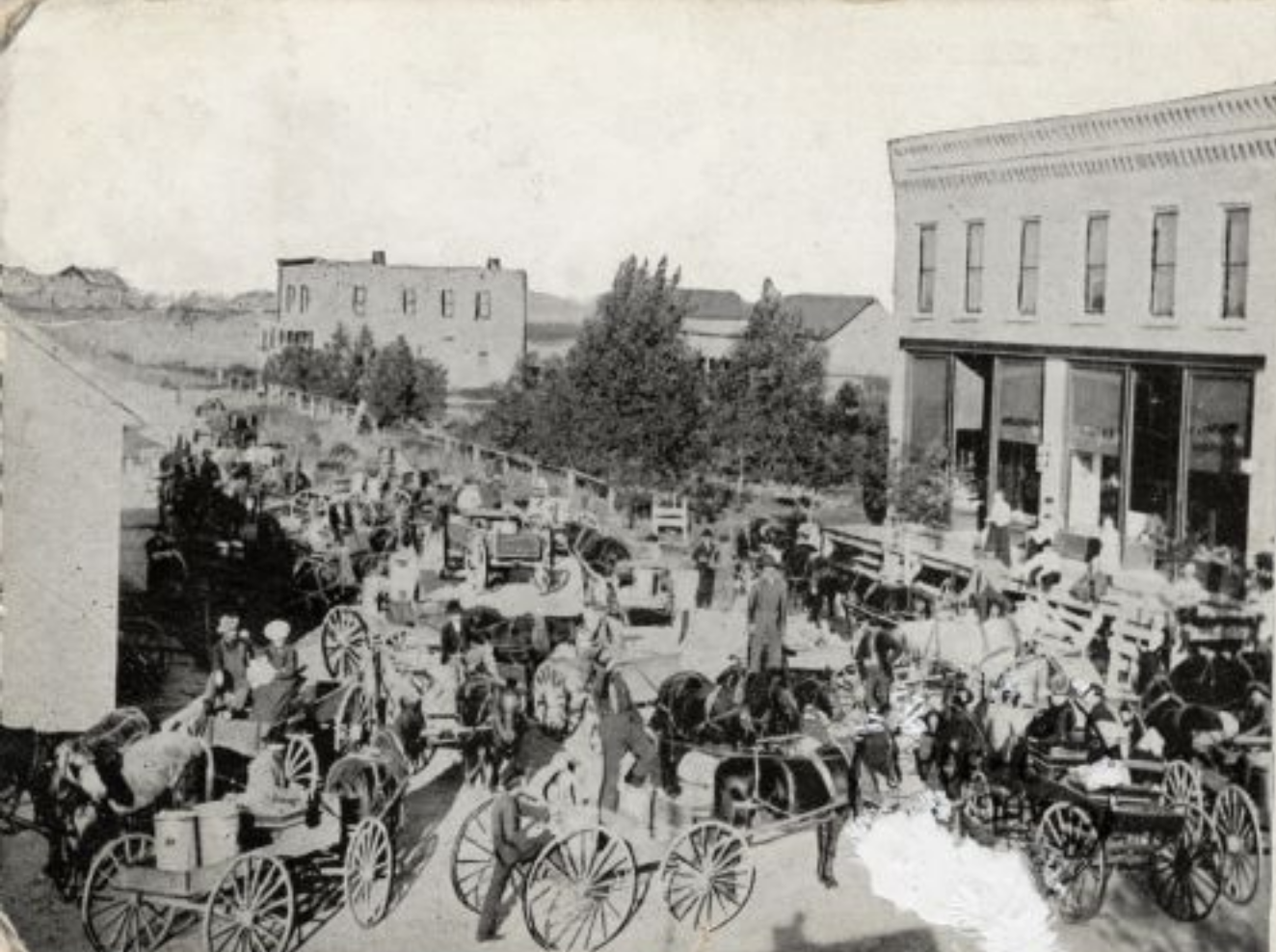
A 1907 postcard depicting early morning traffic in front of C.R. Guth's Store and Creamery. The building on the right was C R Guth's general store, built in 1903 and after changing hands a few times, the store was bought in 1946 by Cyril Virlee. He ran in for 15 years and closed it permanently in 1961. The building on the left is the second creamery, built in 1898 by C R Guth and replaced in 1910 with the present structure.
