= Lincoln (community), Wisconsin =

Lincoln, Wisconsin
- Unincorporated community
- Location within Wisconsin Location within the United States
- Coordinates: 44°37′05″N 87°38′31″W
- Country: United States
- State: Wisconsin
- County: Kewaunee
- Town: Lincoln
- Elevation: 840 ft (260 m)
- Time zone: UTC-6 (Central (CST))
  - Summer (DST): UTC-5 (CDT)
- Area code: 920
- GNIS feature ID: 1568064

Lincoln is an unincorporated community in the town of Lincoln, Kewaunee County, Wisconsin, United States. The community is on County Highway S, 6 miles (10 km) north-northeast of the village of Luxemburg.

== History ==
Lincoln was originally called "Grandlez" in the nineteenth century.
