= Lincoln, Kewaunee County, Wisconsin =

Lincoln, Wisconsin
- Town
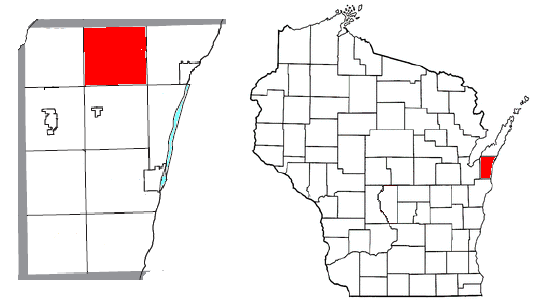
- Location of Lincoln, Wisconsin
- Coordinates: 44°37′55″N 87°35′1″W
- Country: United States
- State: Wisconsin
- County: Kewaunee

Area
  - Total: 35.7 sq mi (92.4 km^{2})
  - Land: 35.7 sq mi (92.4 km^{2})
  - Water: 0 sq mi (0.0 km^{2})
- Elevation: 745 ft (227 m)

Population (2020)
  - Total: 932
  - Density: 26.1/sq mi (10.1/km^{2})
- Time zone: UTC-6 (Central (CST))
  - Summer (DST): UTC-5 (CDT)
- Area code: 920
- FIPS code: 55-44425
- GNIS feature ID: 1583566
- Website: lincolnkewauneewi.com

Lincoln is a town in Kewaunee County, Wisconsin, United States. The population was 932 at the 2020 census. The unincorporated communities of Lincoln, Gregorville, and Euren are in the town. The unincorporated communities of Rio Creek and Rosiere are also partially in the town.

== Geography ==
Lincoln is located in northern Kewaunee County and is bordered to the north by Door County. According to the United States Census Bureau, the town has a total area of 35.7 square miles (92.4 km^{2}), all land.

== Demographics ==
As of the census of 2000, there were 957 people, 334 households, and 263 families residing in the town. The population density was 26.8 people per square mile (10.4/km^{2}). There were 346 housing units at an average density of 9.7 per square mile (3.7/km^{2}). The racial makeup of the town was 98.96% White, 0.10% African American, 0.10% Native American, 0.21% Asian, 0.10% from other races, and 0.52% from two or more races. Hispanic or Latino of any race were 1.25% of the population.

There were 334 households, out of which 40.4% had children under the age of 18 living with them, 69.8% were married couples living together, 5.7% had a female householder with no husband present, and 21.0% were non-families. 17.4% of all households were made up of individuals, and 10.2% had someone living alone who was 65 years of age or older. The average household size was 2.87 and the average family size was 3.23.

In the town, the population was spread out, with 28.5% under the age of 18, 7.6% from 18 to 24, 27.7% from 25 to 44, 23.0% from 45 to 64, and 13.2% who were 65 years of age or older. The median age was 36 years. For every 100 females, there were 105.8 males. For every 100 females age 18 and over, there were 107.3 males.

The median income for a household in the town was $42,188, and the median income for a family was $45,714. Males had a median income of $32,273 versus $20,417 for females. The per capita income for the town was $16,183. About 5.9% of families and 8.9% of the population were below the poverty line, including 9.7% of those under age 18 and 7.7% of those age 65 or over.

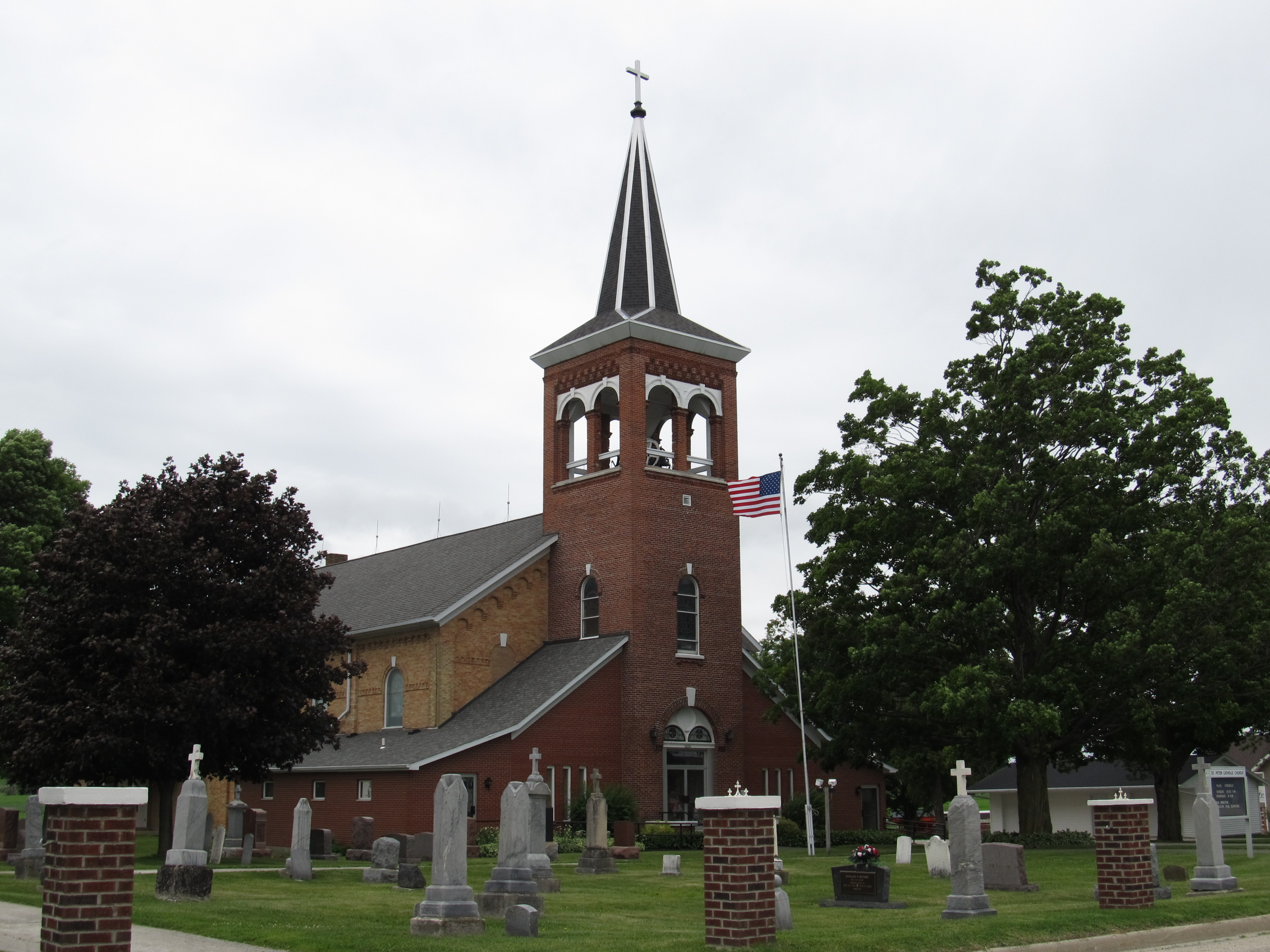
St. Peter's Catholic Church in Lincoln

== History ==
Lincoln is the fourth-most Belgian-American community in the United States, by proportion of population. Lincoln was originally named "GrandLez", after the village of Grand-Leez, now a section of the town of Gembloux, Arrondissement of Namur, province of Namur, Belgium (cfr fr:Grand-Leez). Belgians emigrated from there between 1850 and 1860. Prior to March 21, 1862, what is Lincoln today, was part of Ahnapee.

=== Most Belgian-American towns ===
- 1) Union : 49%
- 2) Red River (Kewaunee County) : 47%
- 3) Brussels (Door County) : 36.4% ( composed of "Brussels community" & "Namur Community")
- 4) Lincoln, Kewaunee County : 35.4%
- 5) Green Bay (Brown County) : 31.8%
