= Cullen, Wisconsin =

- Unincorporated community
- Location within Wisconsin Location within the United States
- Coordinates: 44°57′42″N 87°51′11″W
- Country: United States
- State: Wisconsin
- County: Oconto
- Elevation: 600 ft (180 m)
- Time zone: UTC-6 (Central (CST))
  - Summer (DST): UTC-5 (CDT)
- Area code: 920
- GNIS feature ID: 1577562

Cullen is an unincorporated community located in the town of Little River, Oconto County, Wisconsin, United States. Cullen is located along the Canadian National Railway, 5.2 miles (8.4 km) north of Oconto.
