= Grover, Marinette County, Wisconsin =

Grover, Wisconsin
- Town
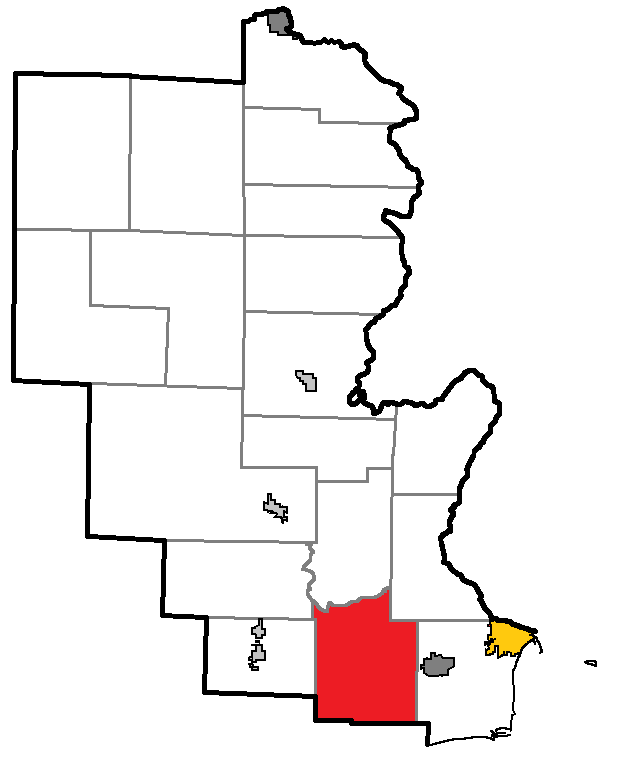
- Location of Grover, within Marinette County
- Coordinates: 45°4′6″N 87°52′22″W
- Country: United States
- State: Wisconsin
- County: Marinette

Area
  - Total: 73.3 sq mi (189.9 km^{2})
  - Land: 73.1 sq mi (189.4 km^{2})
  - Water: 0.19 sq mi (0.5 km^{2})
- Elevation: 690 ft (210 m)

Population (2020)
  - Total: 1,731
  - Density: 23.67/sq mi (9.139/km^{2})
- Time zone: UTC-6 (Central (CST))
  - Summer (DST): UTC-5 (CDT)
- Area code(s): 534 & 715
- FIPS code: 55-31725
- GNIS feature ID: 1583327
- Website: http://townofgroverwi.com

Grover is a town in Marinette County, Wisconsin, United States. The population was 1,731 at the 2020 census.

== Communities ==
- County Line is an unincorporated community located along County Road W, east of US Highway 41 on the Oconto County line.
- Harmony is an unincorporated community located at the intersection of County Roads D and DD.
- May Corner is an unincorporated community located at the intersection of Church and Town Hall Roads.
- Wilcox is a former community. Nothing remains in the vicinity of the site, although a farmstead is nearby on the eastern side of the Canadian National Railway at the end of Wilcox Lane. The community got its name from a local settler.

== Geography ==
According to the United States Census Bureau, the town has a total area of 73.3 square miles (189.9 km^{2}), of which 73.1 square miles (189.4 km^{2}) is land and 0.2 square mile (0.5 km^{2}) (0.27%) is water.

== Demographics ==
As of the census of 2000, there were 1,729 people, 633 households, and 496 families residing in the town. The population density was 23.6 inhabitants per square mile (9.1/km^{2}). There were 676 housing units at an average density of 9.2 per square mile (3.6/km^{2}). The racial makeup of the town was 99.13% White, 0.35% Native American, 0.06% Asian, 0.06% Pacific Islander, 0.12% from other races, and 0.29% from two or more races. Hispanic or Latino of any race were 0.35% of the population.

There were 633 households, out of which 34.0% had children under the age of 18 living with them, 70.8% were married couples living together, 5.1% had a female householder with no husband present, and 21.5% were non-families. 18.5% of all households were made up of individuals, and 8.8% had someone living alone who was 65 years of age or older. The average household size was 2.73 and the average family size was 3.12.

In the town, the population was spread out, with 26.8% under the age of 18, 8.2% from 18 to 24, 27.4% from 25 to 44, 23.5% from 45 to 64, and 14.1% who were 65 years of age or older. The median age was 38 years. For every 100 females, there were 106.6 males. For every 100 females age 18 and over, there were 104.5 males.

The median income for a household in the town was $40,536, and the median income for a family was $45,368. Males had a median income of $29,208 versus $21,553 for females. The per capita income for the town was $17,104. About 7.0% of families and 7.9% of the population were below the poverty line, including 11.2% of those under age 18 and 8.1% of those age 65 or over.
