= Little River, Wisconsin =

- Town
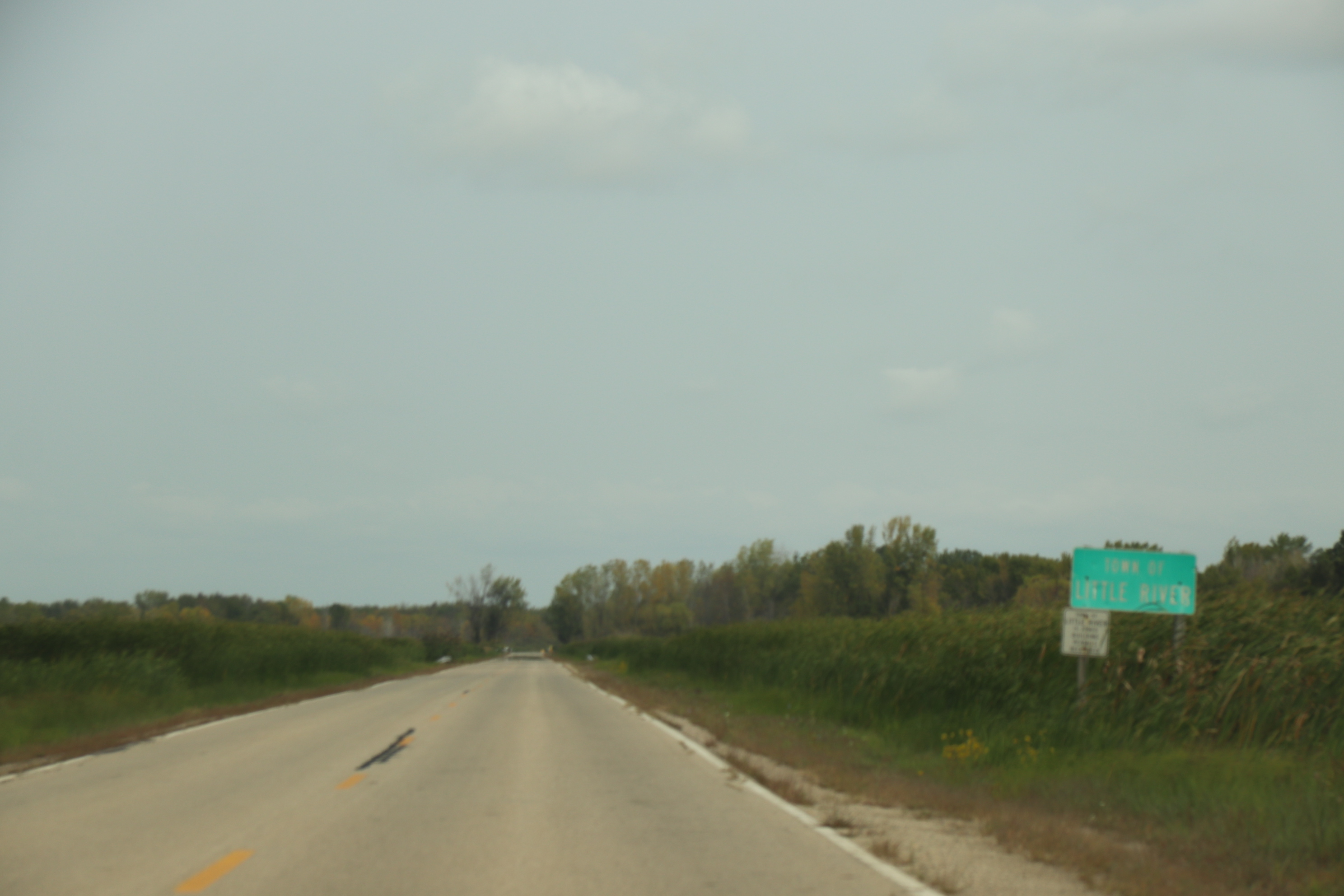
- Sign for Little River

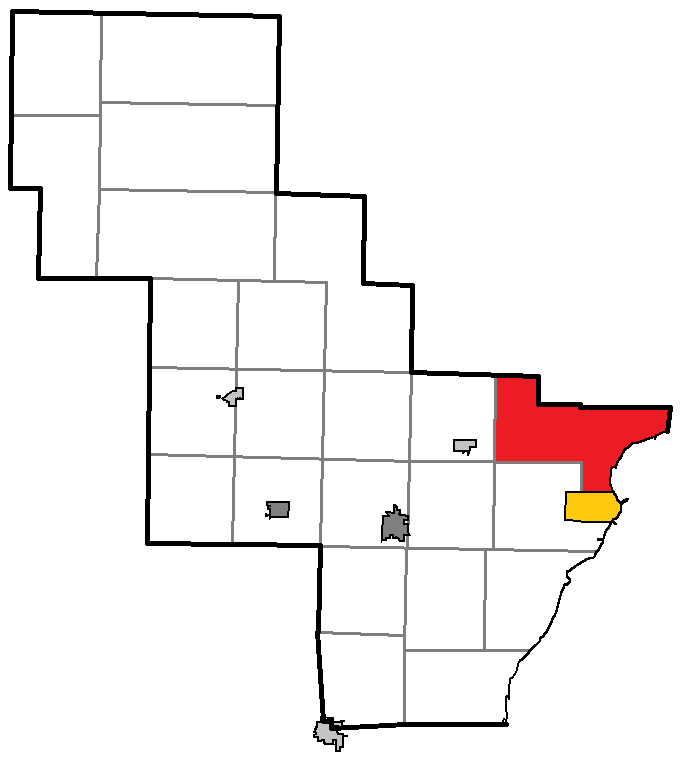
- Location of Little River, within Oconto County
- Coordinates: 44°57′25″N 87°53′0″W
- Country: United States
- State: Wisconsin
- County: Oconto

Area
  - Total: 51.5 sq mi (133.5 km^{2})
  - Land: 51.5 sq mi (133.5 km^{2})
  - Water: 0 sq mi (0.0 km^{2})
- Elevation: 663 ft (202 m)

Population (2020)
  - Total: 1,092
  - Density: 21.19/sq mi (8.180/km^{2})
- Time zone: UTC-6 (Central (CST))
  - Summer (DST): UTC-5 (CDT)
- FIPS code: 55-45175
- GNIS feature ID: 1583585
- Website: https://townoflittleriver.com/

Little River is a town in Oconto County, Wisconsin, United States. The population was 1,092 at the 2020 census. The unincorporated communities of County Line and Cullen are located in the town.

== Geography ==
According to the United States Census Bureau, the town has a total area of 51.5 square miles (133.5 km^{2}), all land.

== Demographics ==
As of the census of 2000, there were 1,065 people, 407 households, and 293 families residing in the town. The population density was 20.7 people per square mile (8.0/km^{2}). There were 457 housing units at an average density of 8.9 per square mile (3.4/km^{2}). The racial makeup of the town was 97.37% White, 0.09% African American, 0.28% Native American, 0.66% Asian, 0.38% from other races, and 1.22% from two or more races. Hispanic or Latino of any race were 1.03% of the population.

There were 407 households, out of which 33.9% had children under the age of 18 living with them, 61.7% were married couples living together, 5.9% had a female householder with no husband present, and 27.8% were non-families. 22.4% of all households were made up of individuals, and 9.1% had someone living alone who was 65 years of age or older. The average household size was 2.62 and the average family size was 3.08.

In the town, the population was spread out, with 27.0% under the age of 18, 7.5% from 18 to 24, 26.4% from 25 to 44, 25.4% from 45 to 64, and 13.7% who were 65 years of age or older. The median age was 39 years. For every 100 females, there were 106.0 males. For every 100 females age 18 and over, there were 107.2 males.

The median income for a household in the town was $40,804, and the median income for a family was $44,938. Males had a median income of $30,388 versus $21,406 for females. The per capita income for the town was $17,576. About 6.4% of families and 11.3% of the population were below the poverty line, including 13.9% of those under age 18 and 12.1% of those age 65 or over.
