= County Line, Wisconsin =

- Unincorporated community
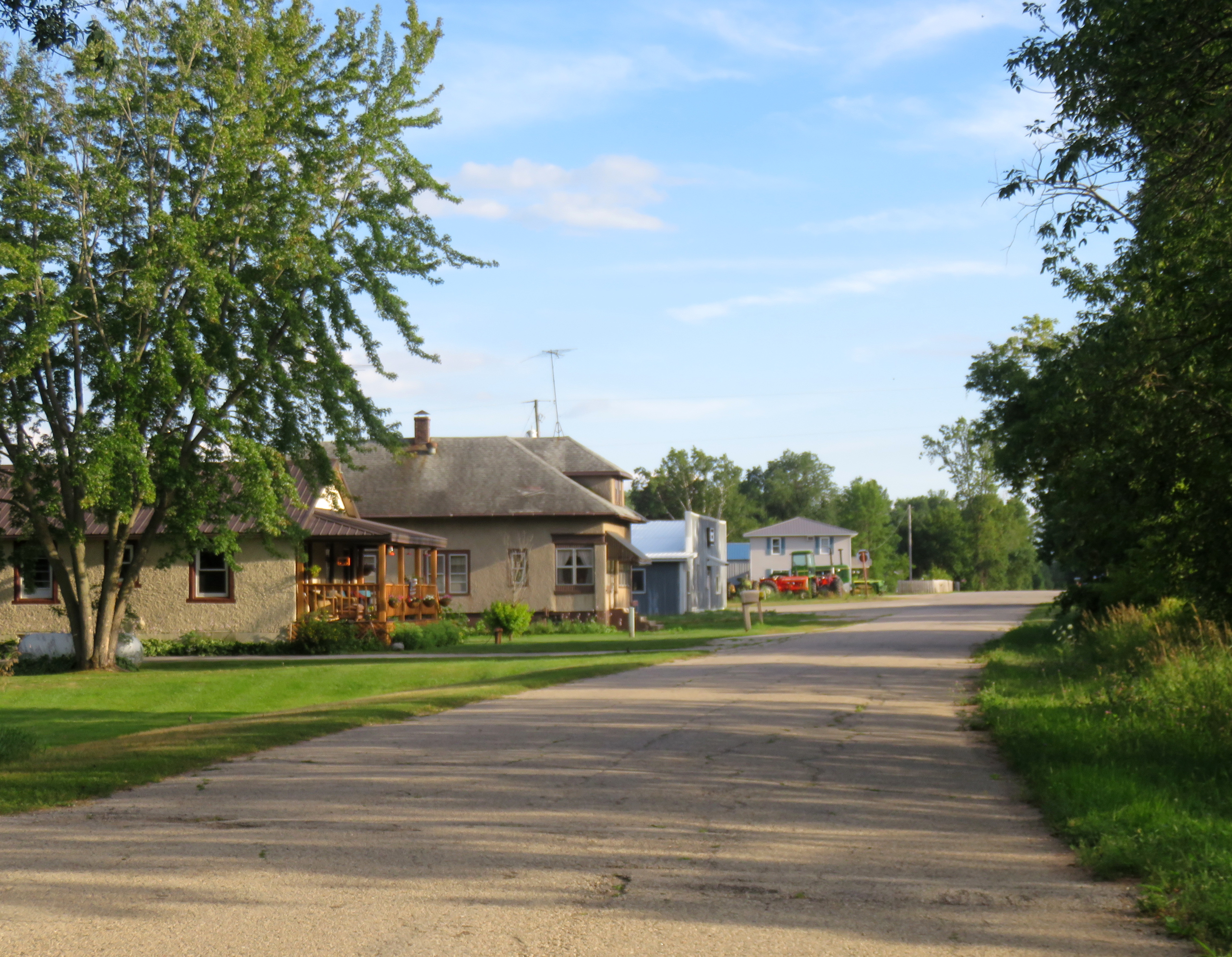

- Location within Wisconsin Location within the United States
- Coordinates: 44°59′25″N 87°51′09″W
- Country: United States
- State: Wisconsin
- Counties: Marinette and Oconto
- Elevation: 623 ft (190 m)
- Time zone: UTC-6 (Central (CST))
  - Summer (DST): UTC-5 (CDT)
- Area codes: 715 & 534
- GNIS feature ID: 1563451

County Line is an unincorporated community located on the border of Marinette and Oconto counties, in the U.S. state of Wisconsin.

== Geography ==
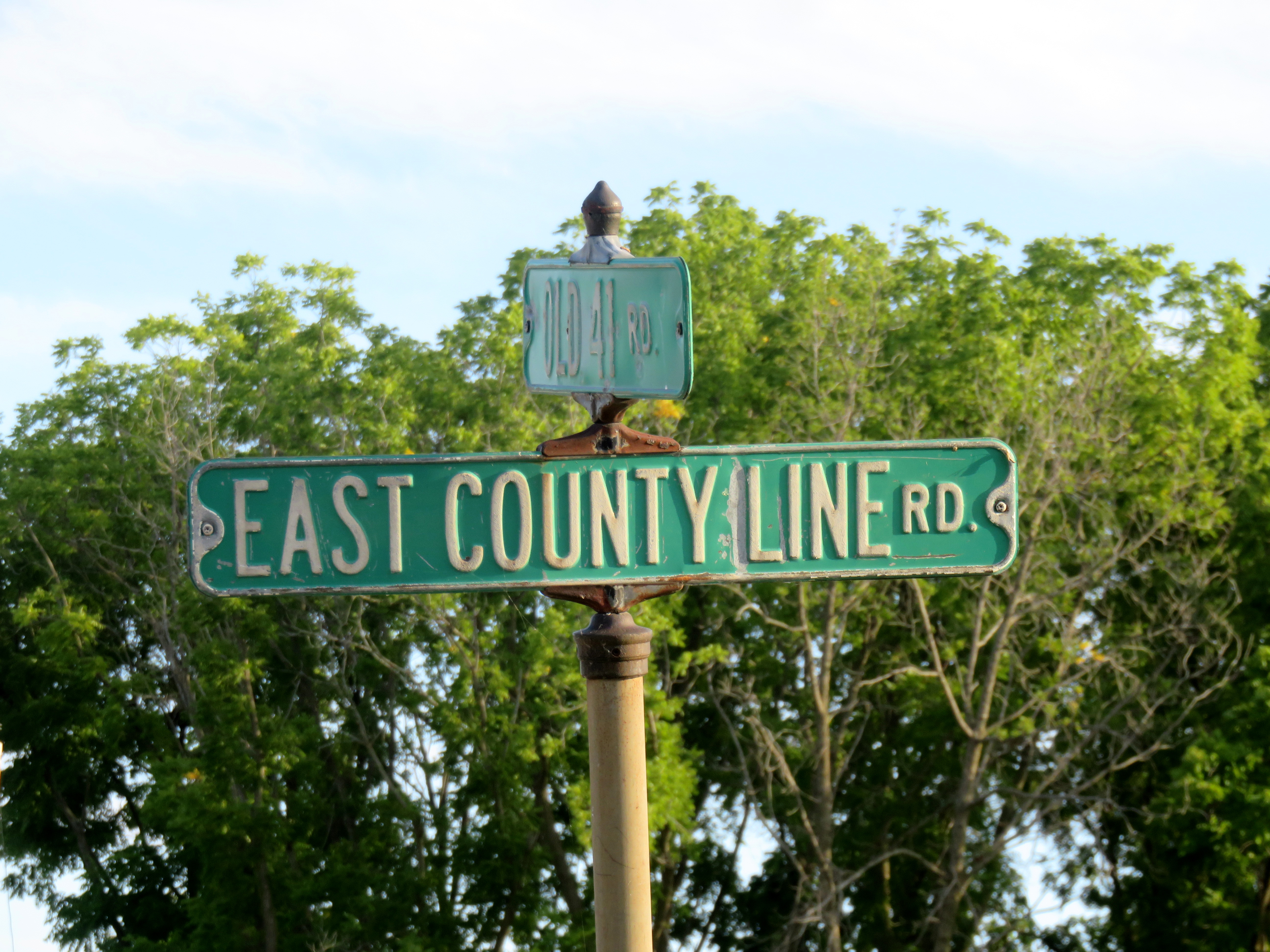
Sign for East County Line Road in County Line

The Marinette County portion of the community is located in the town of Grover, while the Oconto County portion is located in the town of Little River. County Line is located on County Trunk Highway W near U.S. Highway 41, 6.5 miles (10.5 km) southwest of Peshtigo. East County Line Road and Old 41 Road intersect in County Line.
