= Harmony, Marinette County, Wisconsin =

Harmony, Wisconsin
- Unincorporated community
- Location within Wisconsin Location within the United States
- Coordinates: 45°05′57″N 87°49′11″W
- Country: United States
- State: Wisconsin
- County: Marinette
- Elevation: 699 ft (213 m)
- Time zone: UTC-6 (Central (CST))
  - Summer (DST): UTC-5 (CDT)
- Area codes: 715 & 534
- GNIS feature ID: 1566072

Harmony (formerly Harmony Corners) is an unincorporated community located in the town of Grover, Marinette County, Wisconsin, United States. Harmony is located 5 miles (8.0 km) northwest of Peshtigo.

== Geography ==
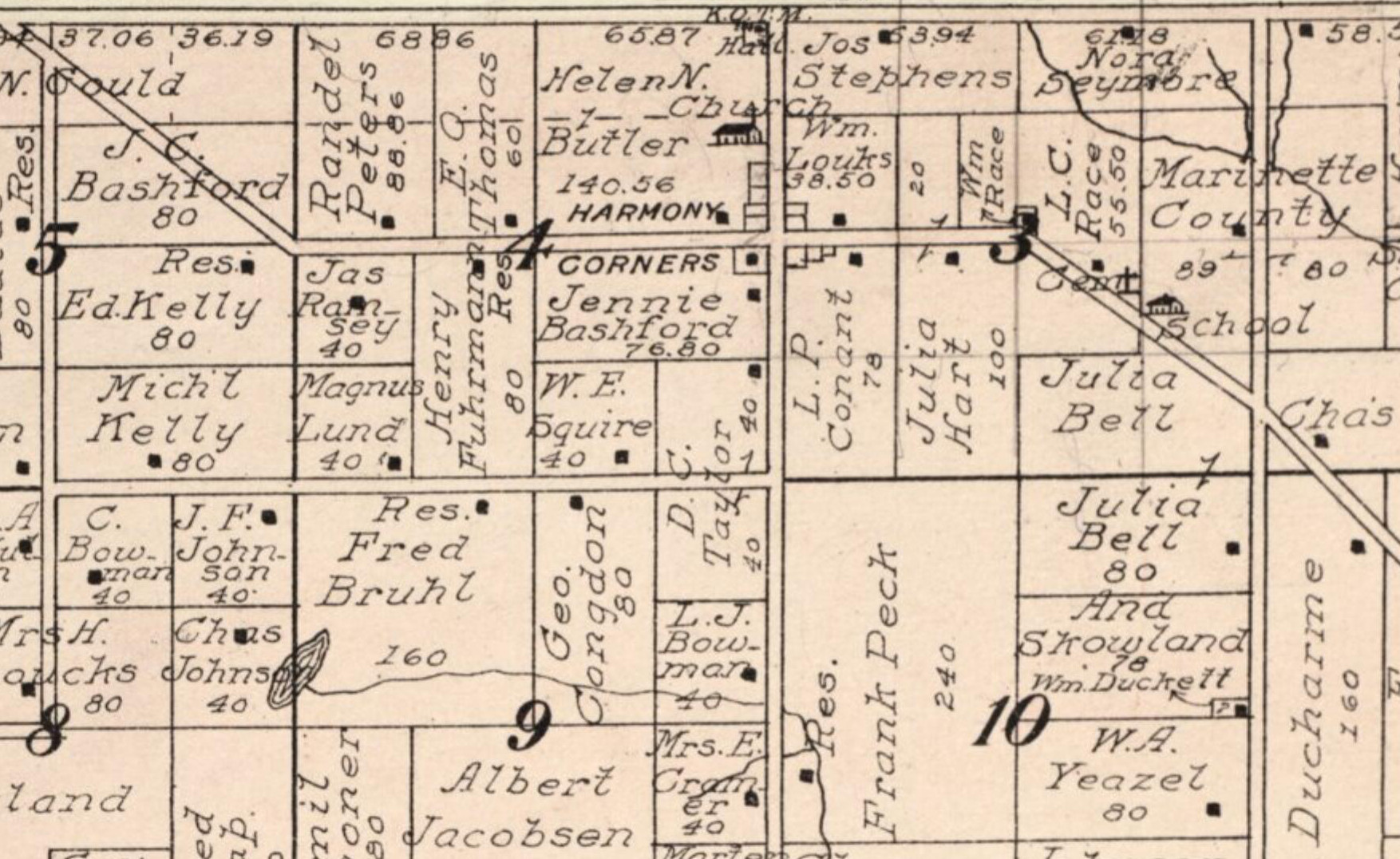
Harmony, 1912 map detail

Harmony is located at the intersection of County Highways D and DD at an elevation of 699 feet (213 m). It is connected by road to Peshtigo to the southeast and Marinette to the east (via Highway 64). The intersection of County Highway D and Highway 64 approximately 1.6 miles (2.6 km) west-northwest of Harmony was formerly known as Gould's Corners after a farm located there owned by Addison Norris Gould (1850–1925).

== History ==
A post office was established in Harmony in 1885 and James H. Potter (1827–1905) was appointed postmaster. A cheese factory formerly operated in Harmony.
