= May Corner, Wisconsin =

- Unincorporated community
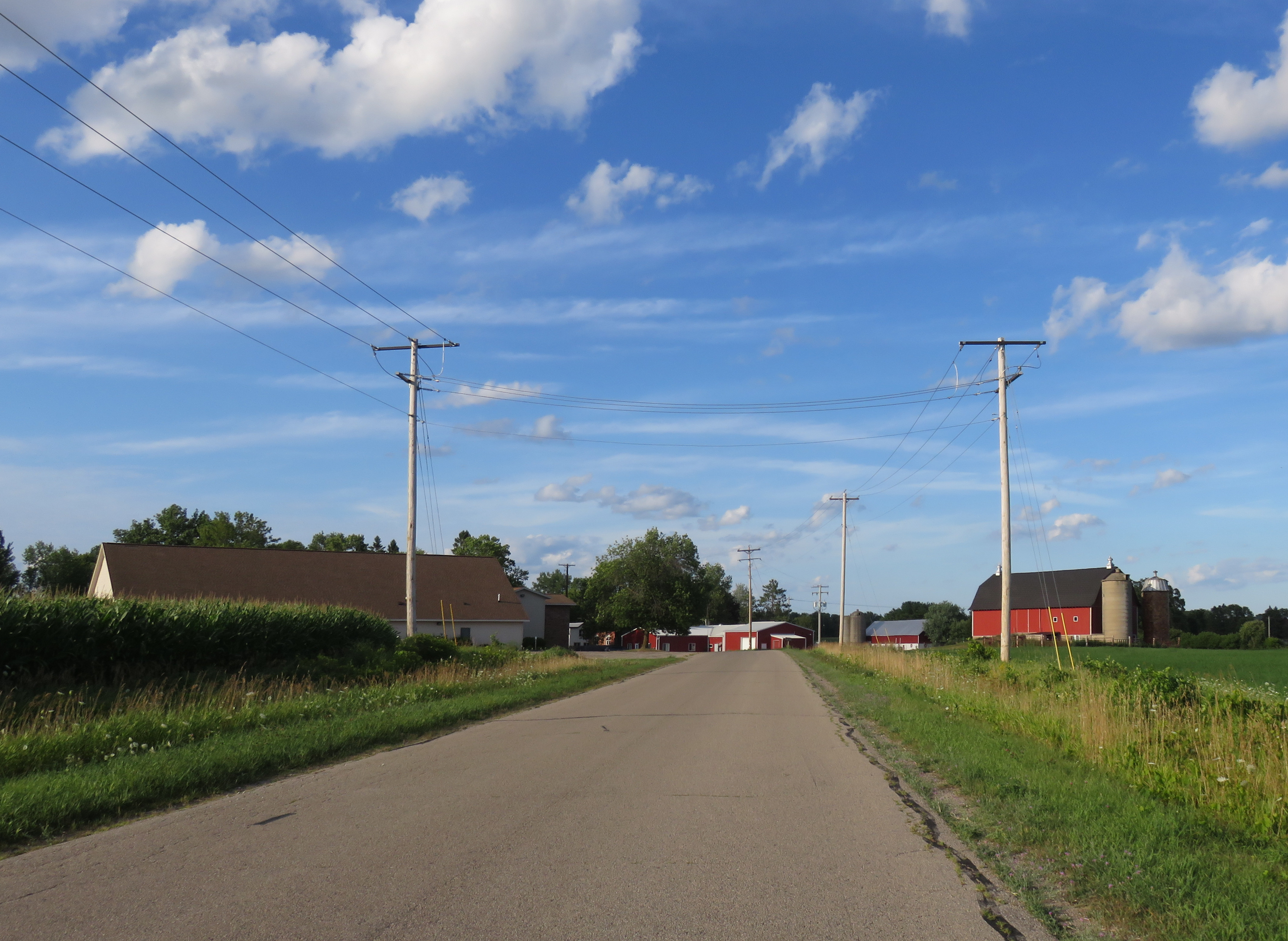

- Location within Wisconsin Location within the United States
- Coordinates: 45°02′57″N 87°51′02″W
- Country: United States
- State: Wisconsin
- County: Marinette
- Elevation: 653 ft (199 m)
- Time zone: UTC-6 (Central (CST))
  - Summer (DST): UTC-5 (CDT)
- Area codes: 715 & 534
- GNIS feature ID: 1569142

May Corner is an unincorporated community located in the town of Grover, Marinette County, Wisconsin, United States.

== Geography ==
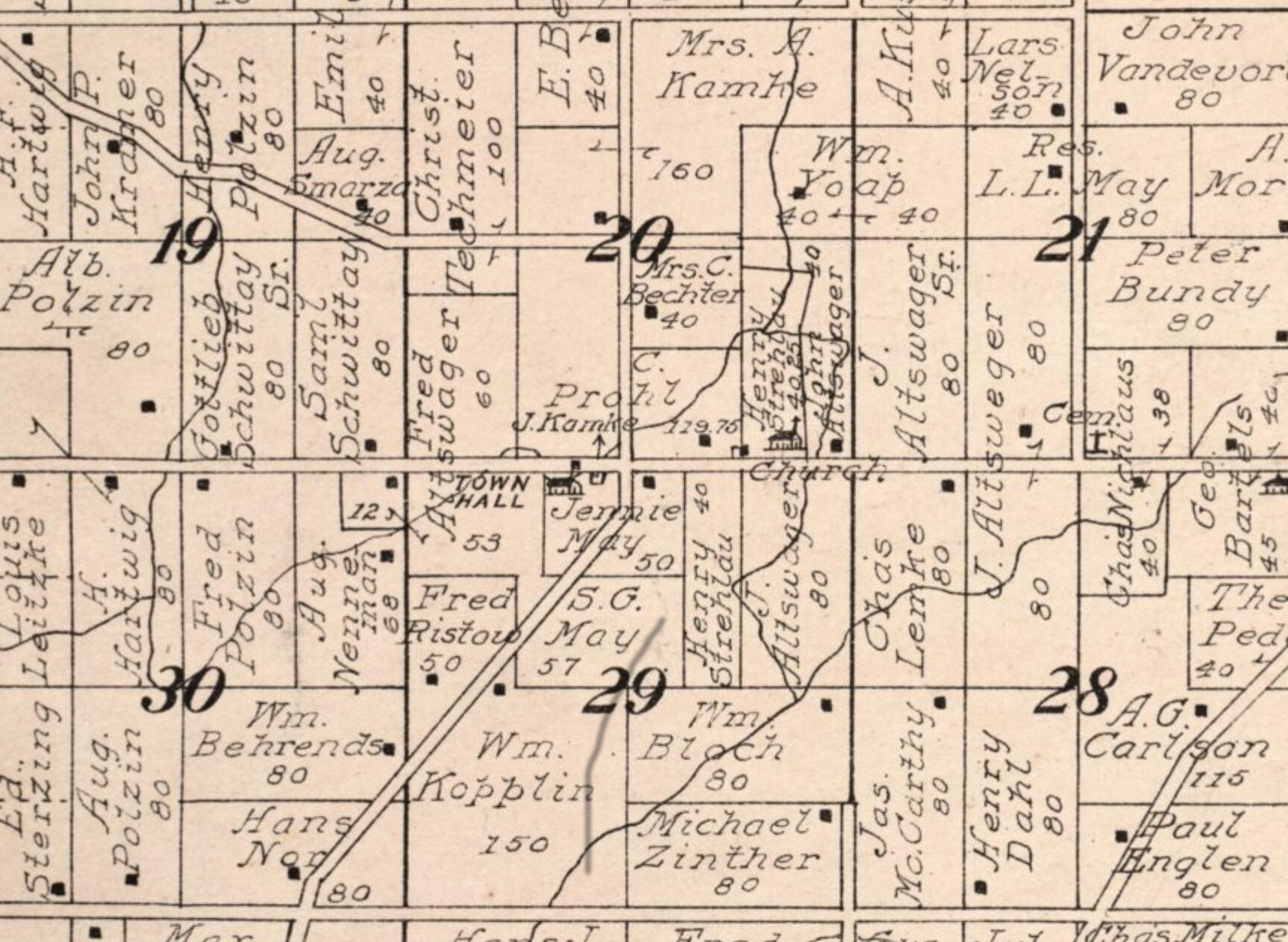
May Corner, 1912 map detail

May Corner is located 5 miles (8.0 km) west of Peshtigo, at the intersection of Town Hall Road and Church Road, at an elevation of 653 feet (199 m). Bundy Creek, a tributary of the Peshtigo River, flows through the settlement. May Corner is connected to a frontage road of U.S. Route 41 to the east, County Trunk Highway M to the south, and County Trunk Highway W to the west. The Grover town hall is located to the west, and Grover Community Church stands to the south.

== Name ==
May Corner is named after the May farm, which stood on the south side of the intersection. It was owned by Sam G. May (1839–1910), and later by his widow Janet "Jennie" May, née McFarlane (1853–1926).
