= Green Bay metropolitan area =

Coordinates: 44°45′N 88°00′W

Green Bay Area
- Combined Statistical Area
Map of Green Bay–Shawano, WI CSA
City of Green Bay
Green Bay, WI MSA
Shawano, WI µSA
- Country: United States
- State: Wisconsin
- Largest city: Green Bay

Area
  - Land: 1,880 sq mi (4,870 km^{2})

Population
  - Total: 336,756

GDP
  - Total: $26.28 billion (2023)
- Time zone: UTC−06:00 (CST)
  - Summer (DST): UTC−05:00 (CDT)

The Green Bay metropolitan statistical area, as defined by the U.S. Office of Management and Budget, is a metropolitan area in northeastern Wisconsin anchored by the City of Green Bay. It is Wisconsin's fourth largest metropolitan statistical area by population. As of the 2020 census, the MSA had a combined population of 328,268. The MSA is a component of the broader Green Bay–Shawano, WI Combined Statistical Area, which also includes the Shawano, WI micropolitan area (Menominee and Shawano Counties). The CSA had a total population of 373,404 at the 2020 census.

== Counties ==
- Brown
- Kewaunee
- Oconto

== Cities ==
=== Principal ===
- Green Bay

=== Metro area cities and villages with more than 10,000 inhabitants ===
- Allouez
- Ashwaubenon
- Bellevue
- De Pere
- Hobart
- Howard
- Suamico

=== Metro area cities and villages with fewer than 10,000 inhabitants ===
- Algoma
- Casco
- Denmark
- Gillett
- Kewaunee
- Lena
- Luxemburg
- Oconto
- Oconto Falls
- Pulaski (partial)
- Suring
- Wrightstown

=== Unincorporated communities ===
- Anston
- Askeaton
- Champion
- Dyckesville
- Greenleaf
- Flintville
- New Franken
- Little Rapids
- Sobieski

=== Towns ===
==== Brown County ====
- Eaton
- Glenmore
- Green Bay
- Holland
- Humboldt
- Lawrence
- Ledgeview
- Morrison
- New Denmark
- Pittsfield
- Rockland
- Scott
- Wrightstown

==== Kewaunee County ====
- Ahnapee
- Carlton
- Casco
- Franklin
- Lincoln
- Luxemburg
- Montpelier
- Pierce
- Red River
- West Kewaunee

==== Oconto County ====
- Abrams
- Bagley
- Brazeau
- Breed
- Chase
- Doty
- Gillett
- How
- Lakewood
- Lena
- Little River
- Little Suamico
- Maple Valley
- Morgan
- Mountain
- Oconto Falls
- Oconto
- Pensaukee
- Riverview
- Spruce
- Stiles
- Townsend
- Underhill

== View at night ==
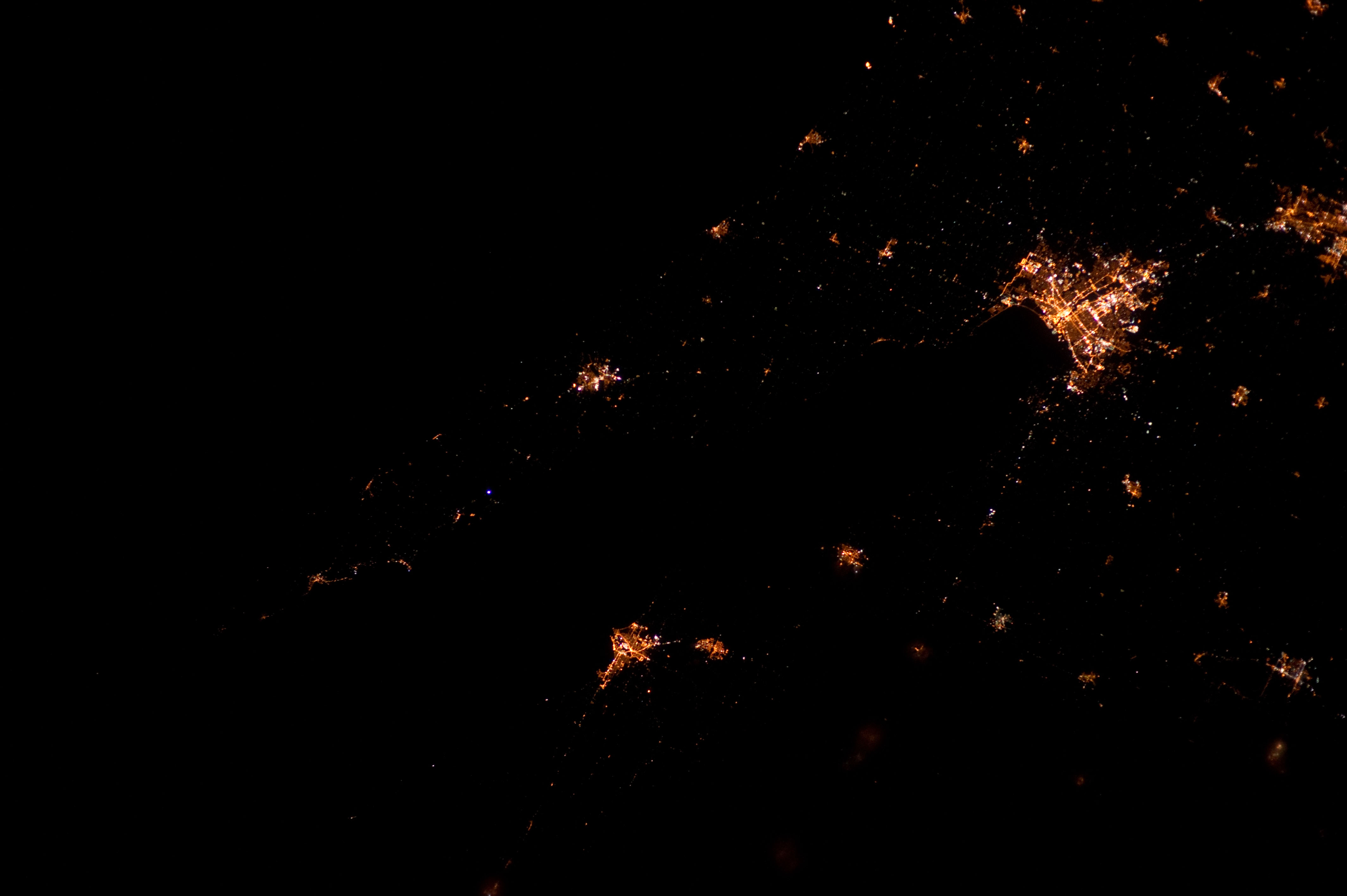
A portion of the metro area, taken 1:10 AM CDT, March 27, 2012 during Expedition 30 of the ISS

== Demographics ==
Historical population
Census	Pop.	Note	%±
1900	46,359		—
1910	54,098		16.7%
1920	61,889		14.4%
1930	70,249		13.5%
1940	83,109		18.3%
1950	98,314		18.3%
1960	168,474		71.4%
1970	202,758		20.3%
1980	223,766		10.4%
1990	243,698		8.9%
2000	282,599		16.0%
2010	306,241		8.4%
2020	328,268		7.2%
2021 (est.)	329,490		0.4%
U.S. Decennial Census

As of the census of 2000, there were 282,599 people, 108,897 households, and 73,126 families residing within the MSA. The racial makeup of the MSA was 92.51% White, 0.96% African American, 1.95% Native American, 1.78% Asian, 0.02% Pacific Islander, 1.57% from other races, and 1.20% from two or more races. Hispanic or Latino of any race were 3.22% of the population.

The median income for a household in the MSA was $43,824, and the median income for a family was $51,085. Males had a median income of $34,552 versus $23,499 for females. The per capita income for the MSA was $19,752.

County	Seat	2025 estimate	2020 Census	Change	Land area	Density
Brown	Green Bay	275,803	268,740	+2.63%	530 sq mi (1,400 km^{2})	520/sq mi (201/km^{2})
Oconto	Oconto	40,195	38,965	+3.16%	998 sq mi (2,580 km^{2})	40/sq mi (16/km^{2})
Kewaunee	Kewaunee	20,758	20,563	+0.95%	343 sq mi (890 km^{2})	61/sq mi (23/km^{2})
Total		336,756	328,268	+2.59%	1,871 sq mi (4,850 km^{2})	180/sq mi (69/km^{2})

== Combined Statistical Area ==
The Green Bay–Shawano, WI Combined Statistical Area is made up of five counties in northeastern Wisconsin. The combined statistical area includes one metropolitan area and one micropolitan area. It had a population of 373,404 at the 2020 census, increasing to an estimated 382,515 in 2025. The CSA is the 107th largest in the United States.

Statistical Area	2025 estimate	2020 Census	Change	Land area	Density
Green Bay, WI Metropolitan Statistical Area	336,756	328,268	+2.59%	1,871 sq mi (4,850 km^{2})	180/sq mi (69/km^{2})
Shawano, WI Micropolitan Statistical Area	45,759	45,136	+1.38%	1,251 sq mi (3,240 km^{2})	37/sq mi (14/km^{2})
Total	382,515	373,404	+2.44%	3,122 sq mi (8,090 km^{2})	123/sq mi (47/km^{2})

== See also ==
- Wisconsin census statistical areas
- Political subdivisions of Wisconsin
