= Oconto =

Oconto may refer to:

== Canada ==
- Oconto, Ontario, a community in Central Frontenac township

== United States ==
- Oconto, Nebraska, a village
- Oconto, Wisconsin, a city
- Oconto (town), Wisconsin, adjacent to the city
- Oconto County, Wisconsin
- Oconto High School, in Oconto, Wisconsin
- Oconto River, a river in Wisconsin

== See also ==
- Oconto Falls, Wisconsin, a city
- Oconto Falls (town), Wisconsin, adjacent to the city
- Oconto Falls High School, in Oconto Falls, Wisconsin
