= Hintz, Wisconsin =

- Unincorporated community
- Location within Wisconsin Location within the United States
- Coordinates: 44°54′57″N 88°24′36″W
- Country: United States
- State: Wisconsin
- County: Oconto
- Elevation: 801 ft (244 m)
- Time zone: UTC-6 (Central (CST))
  - Summer (DST): UTC-5 (CDT)
- Area code: 920
- GNIS feature ID: 1566485

Hintz is an unincorporated community located in the town of Underhill, Oconto County, Wisconsin, United States. Hintz is located on the Oconto River and County Highway H, 5.35 miles (8.61 km) west-northwest of Gillett. Hintz was named for Robert Hintz, the community's first postmaster. The town did have a post office that operated from 1898 to 1905.
