= Mosling, Wisconsin =

- Unincorporated community
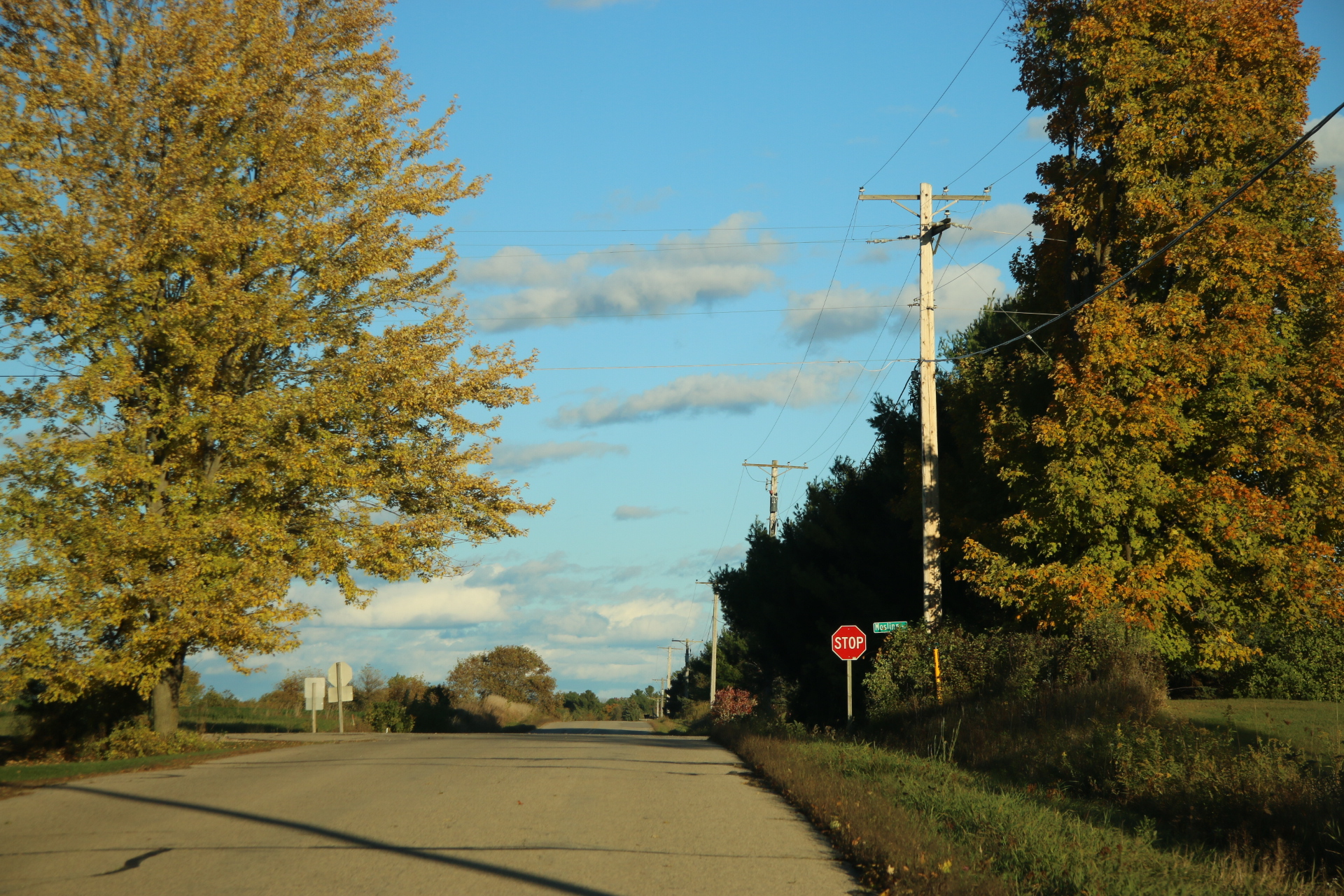
- Looking east at Mosling

- Location within Wisconsin Location within the United States
- Coordinates: 44°52′08″N 88°22′10″W
- Country: United States
- State: Wisconsin
- County: Oconto
- Elevation: 846 ft (258 m)
- Time zone: UTC-6 (Central (CST))
  - Summer (DST): UTC-5 (CDT)
- Area code: 920
- GNIS feature ID: 1569773

Mosling is an unincorporated community located in the towns of Gillett and Underhill, Oconto County, Wisconsin, United States. Mosling is located on County Highway P, 3.4 miles (5.5 km) west-southwest of Gillett.

== History ==
A post office called Mosling was established in 1897, and remained in operation until it was discontinued in 1929. Mosling was named in honor of an early merchant.
