= Gillett School District (Wisconsin) =

School district in Wisconsin, United States

Address
- 208 W Main St Gillett, Wisconsin, 54124; United States

District information
- Grades: PK–12
- Schools: 3
- NCES District ID: 5505250

Students and staff
- Students: 549 (2024–25)
- Teachers: 48.78 (on an FTE basis)
- Student–teacher ratio: 11.25

Other information
- Website: www.gillett.k12.wi.us

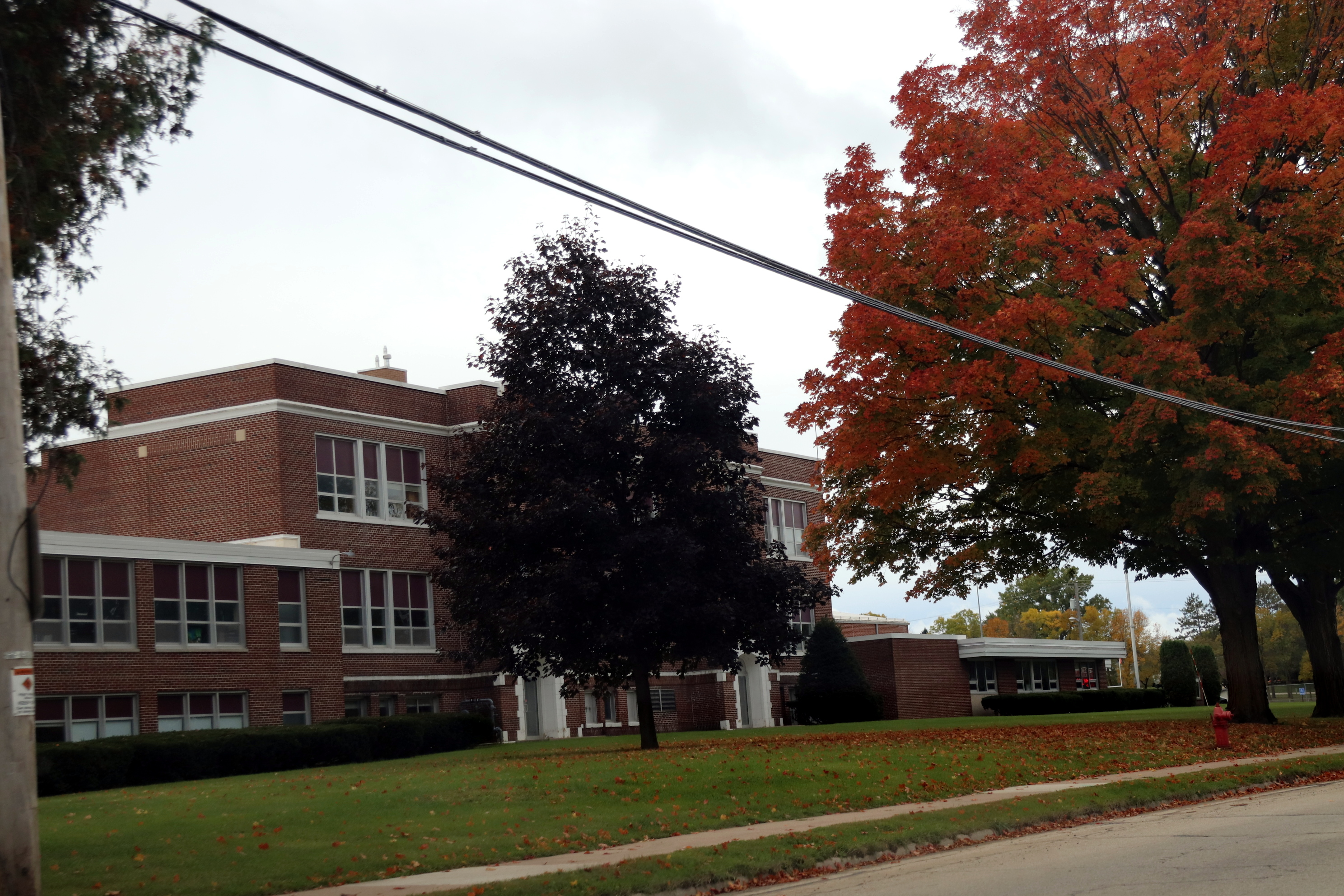
Gillett High School

Gillett School District is a school district based in Gillett, Wisconsin.

== Schools ==
- Gillett High School
- Gillett Middle School
- Gillett Elementary School
