= Gillett, Wisconsin =

- City
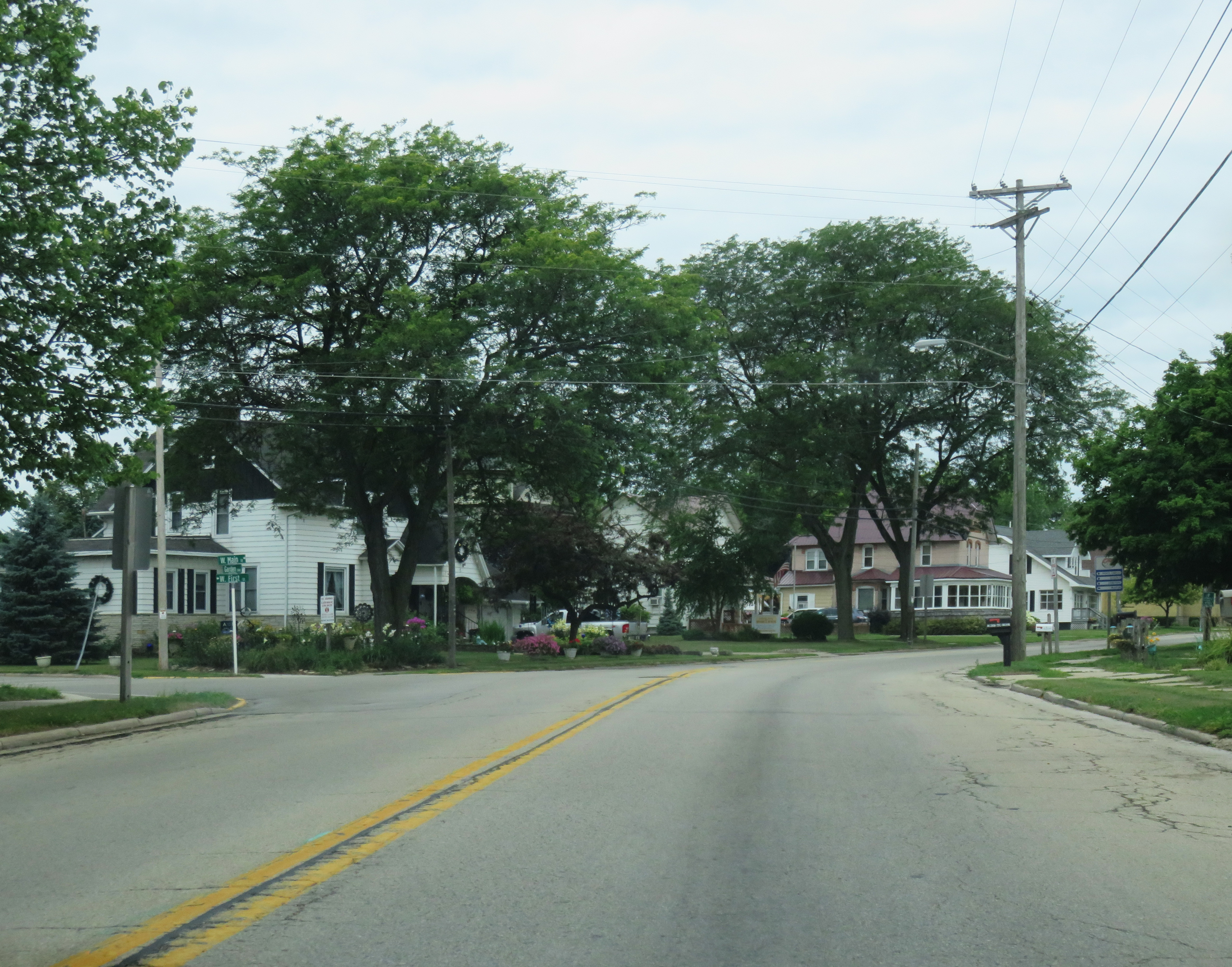
- Corner of West Main Street and West 1st Street in Gillett

- Location of Gillett in Oconto County, Wisconsin.

- Location within Wisconsin Location within the United States
- Country: United States
- State: Wisconsin
- County: Oconto County

Area
  - Total: 1.36 sq mi (3.52 km^{2})
  - Land: 1.35 sq mi (3.50 km^{2})
  - Water: 0.012 sq mi (0.03 km^{2})

Population (2020)
  - Total: 1,289
  - Density: 954/sq mi (368/km^{2})
- Time zone: UTC-6 (Central (CST))
  - Summer (DST): UTC-5 (CDT)
- FIPS code: 55-29050
- Website: cityofgillett.com

Gillett is a city in Oconto County, Wisconsin, United States. The population was 1,289 at the 2020 census. It is part of the Green Bay metropolitan area. The city is adjacent to the Town of Gillett.

== History ==
A post office called Gillett has been in operation since 1871. The city was named for Rodney Stephen Gillett (1833–1906), a pioneer settler.

== Geography ==
Gillett is located at 44°53′23″N 88°18′23″W.

According to the United States Census Bureau, the city has a total area of 1.37 square miles (3.55 km^{2}), of which 1.36 square miles (3.52 km^{2}) is land and 0.01 square miles (0.03 km^{2}) is water.

== Demographics ==
Historical population
Census	Pop.	Note	%±
1910	610		—
1920	785		28.7%
1930	1,076		37.1%
1940	1,145		6.4%
1950	1,410		23.1%
1960	1,374		−2.6%
1970	1,288		−6.3%
1980	1,356		5.3%
1990	1,303		−3.9%
2000	1,256		−3.6%
2010	1,386		10.4%
2020	1,289		−7.0%
U.S. Decennial Census

=== 2010 census ===
As of the census of 2010, there were 1,386 people, 592 households, and 352 families living in the city. The population density was 1,019.1 inhabitants per square mile (393.5/km^{2}). There were 656 housing units at an average density of 482.4 per square mile (186.3/km^{2}). The racial makeup of the city was 91.0% White, 0.1% African American, 3.4% Native American, 4.3% from other races, and 1.2% from two or more races. Hispanic or Latino of any race were 5.1% of the population.

There were 592 households, of which 31.9% had children under the age of 18 living with them, 40.7% were married couples living together, 12.8% had a female householder with no husband present, 5.9% had a male householder with no wife present, and 40.5% were non-families. 34.6% of all households were made up of individuals, and 14.9% had someone living alone who was 65 years of age or older. The average household size was 2.29 and the average family size was 2.86.

The median age in the city was 41.1 years. 23.2% of residents were under the age of 18; 7.9% were between the ages of 18 and 24; 24.8% were from 25 to 44; 26.1% were from 45 to 64; and 18% were 65 years of age or older. The gender makeup of the city was 47.4% male and 52.6% female.

=== 2000 census ===
At the 2000 census, there were 1,256 people, 515 households and 329 families living in the city. The population density was 923.9 per square mile (356.6/km^{2}). There were 546 housing units at an average density of 401.6 per square mile (155.0/km^{2}). The racial makeup of the city was 96.58% White, 0.40% Black or African American, 1.19% Native American, 1.04% from other races, and 0.80% from two or more races. 0.88% of the population were Hispanic or Latino of any race.

There were 515 households, of which 33.0% had children under the age of 18 living with them, 49.9% were married couples living together, 10.1% had a female householder with no husband present, and 36.1% were non-families. 32.2% of all households were made up of individuals, and 17.3% had someone living alone who was 65 years of age or older. The average household size was 2.38 and the average family size was 3.02.

Age distribution was 26.9% under the age of 18, 5.7% from 18 to 24, 28.6% from 25 to 44, 18.9% from 45 to 64, and 19.9% who were 65 years of age or older. The median age was 37 years. For every 100 females, there were 89.2 males. For every 100 females age 18 and over, there were 84.0 males.

The median household income was $36,667, and the median family income was $41,364. Males had a median income of $30,481 versus $19,875 for females. The per capita income for the city was $16,737. About 7.6% of families and 9.2% of the population were below the poverty line, including 12.8% of those under age 18 and 6.8% of those age 65 or over.

== Education ==
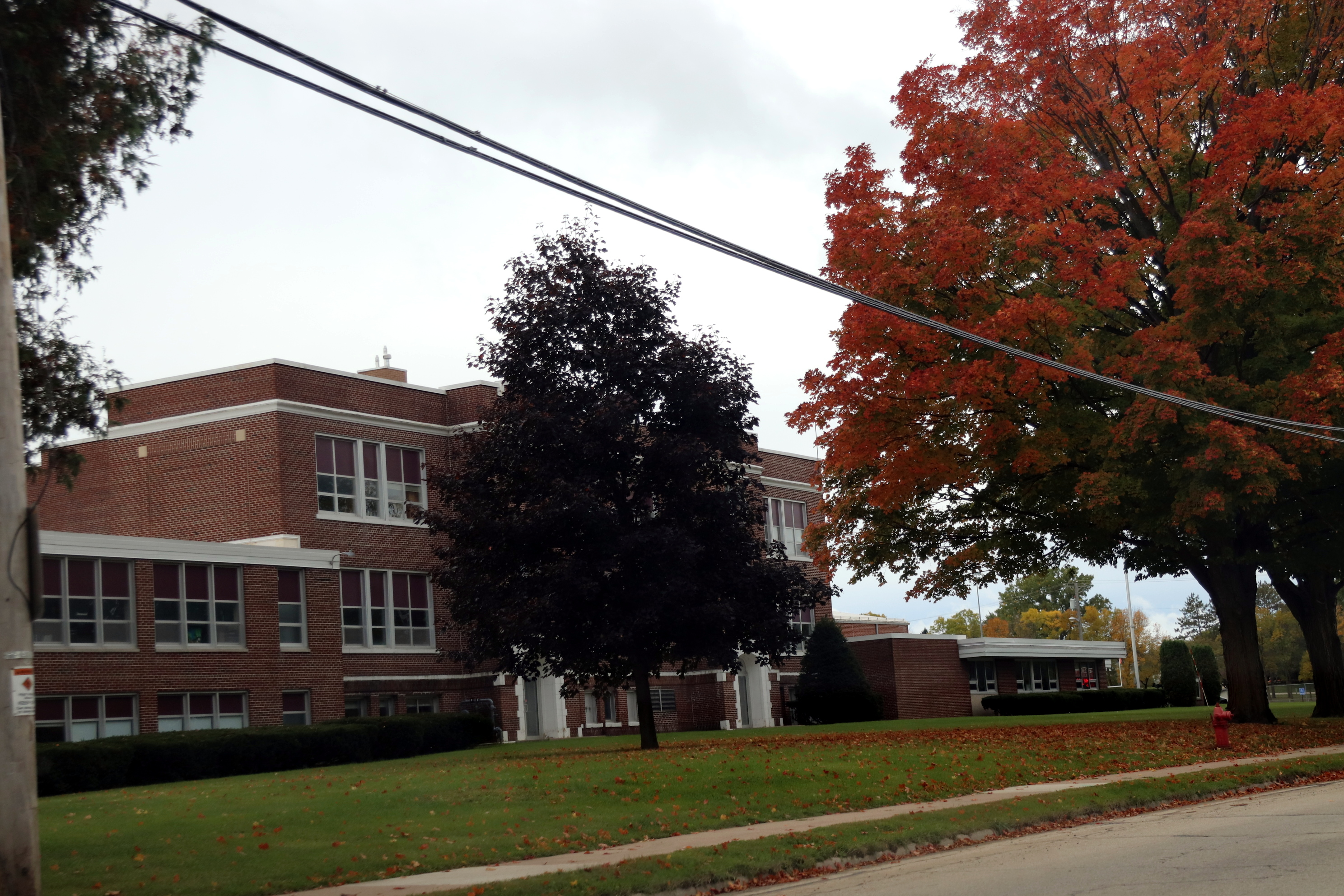
Gillett High School

Gillett School District operates public schools, including Gillett Elementary School, Gillett Middle School, and Gillett High School.

== Tourism ==
For over a decade, Gillett has billed itself as the "ATV Capital of the World". Gillett Sno & ATV Riders maintain over 15 miles of trail within the city itself and the towns of Maple Valley and Underhill.

== Images ==
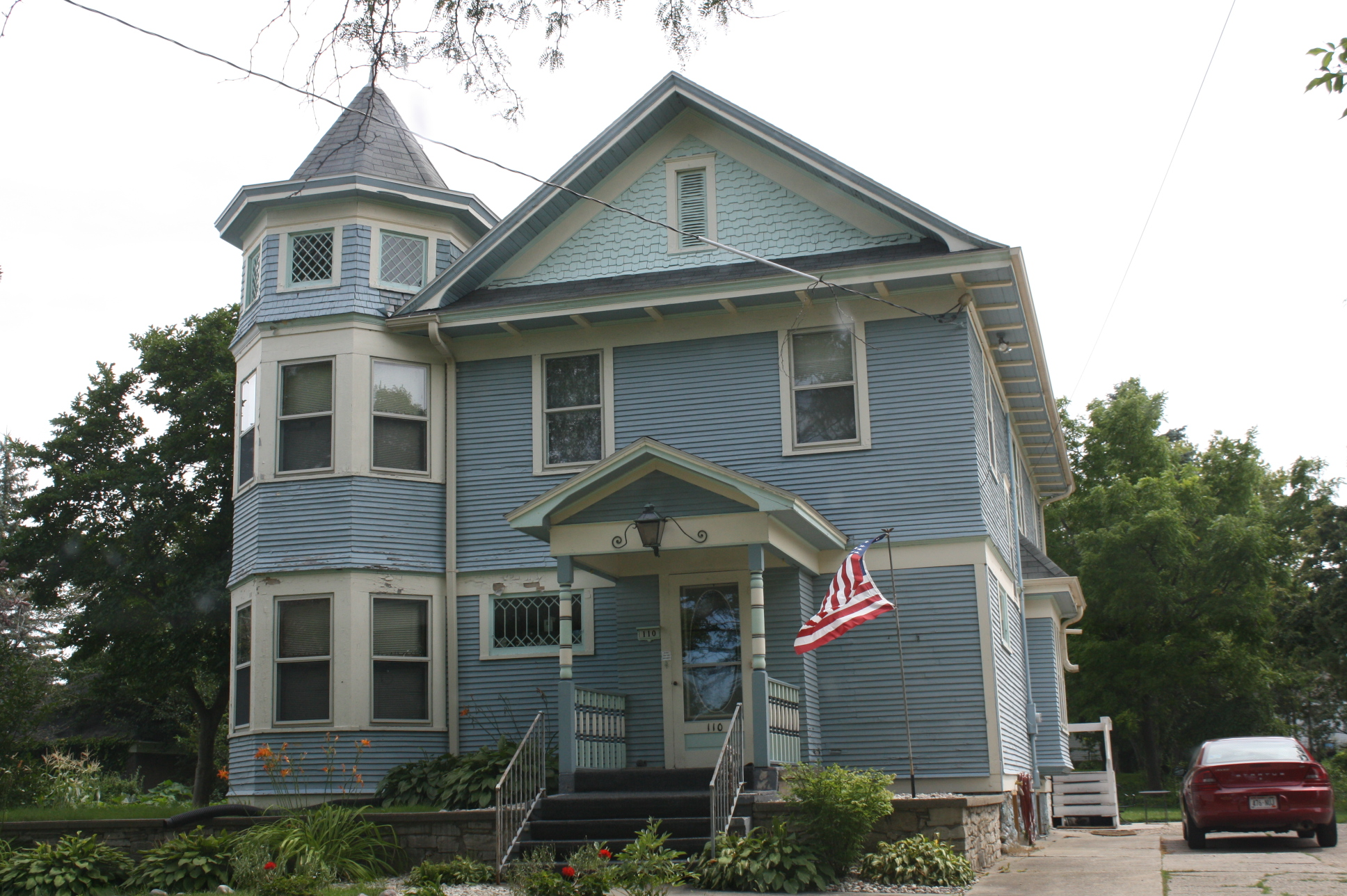
Gillett Area Historical Museum on WIS 22

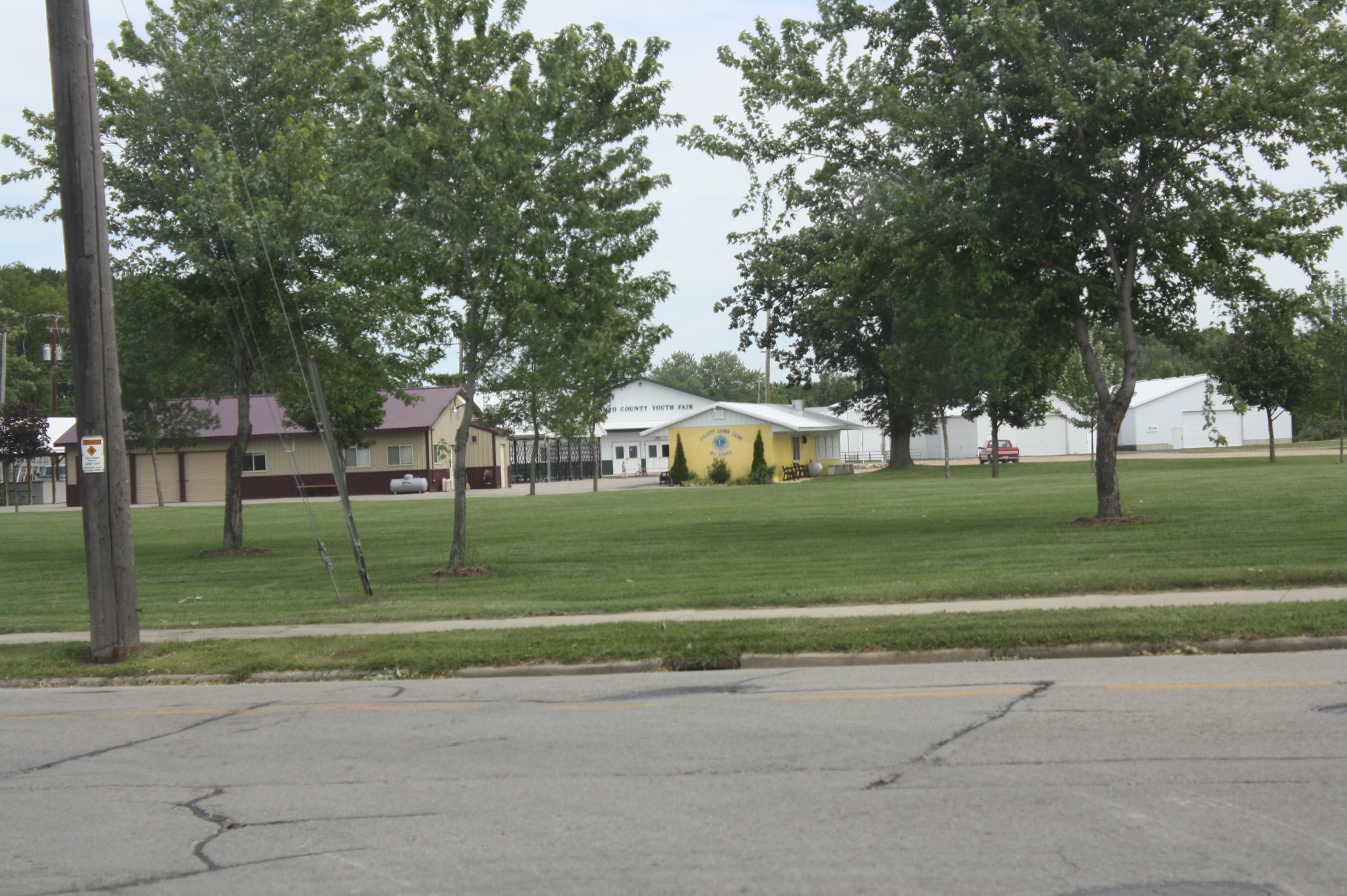
Oconto County fairgrounds
