= Sobieski, Wisconsin =

Census-designated place in Wisconsin, United States

Sobieski
- Census-designated place
- Location within the state of Wisconsin
- Coordinates: 44°43′15″N 88°4′19″W
- Country: United States
- State: Wisconsin
- County: Oconto

Area
  - Total: 1.259 sq mi (3.26 km^{2})
  - Land: 1.259 sq mi (3.26 km^{2})
  - Water: 0 sq mi (0 km^{2})

Population (2020)
  - Total: 275
  - Density: 218/sq mi (84.3/km^{2})
- Time zone: UTC-6 (Central (CST))
  - Summer (DST): UTC-5 (CDT)
- ZIP codes: 54171
- Area code: 920

Sobieski is an unincorporated census-designated place in Oconto County in northeastern Wisconsin, United States. It is located within the Town of Little Suamico. As of the 2020 census, its population was 275, up from 259 at the 2010 census. It is part of the Green Bay Metropolitan Statistical Area. The Little Suamico Town Hall is located in Sobieski, just east of the Escanaba and Lake Superior Railroad.

Sobieski is located along County Trunk Highway S and Cross Road. Sandalwood Road and Krause Road also enter the community. The Little Suamico River flows just south of the St. Maximilian parish cemetery. County S intersects with U.S. Route 141 about a half-mile east of Sobieski. The town did have an operating post office from 1894 to 1976, when it was discontinued. The town was named in honor of King John Sobieski of Poland. The Polish immigrants who settled here bought large amounts of land for farming. The land was originally owned by a logging baron who opened the first land office in 1895.
