= Lena, Wisconsin =

- Village
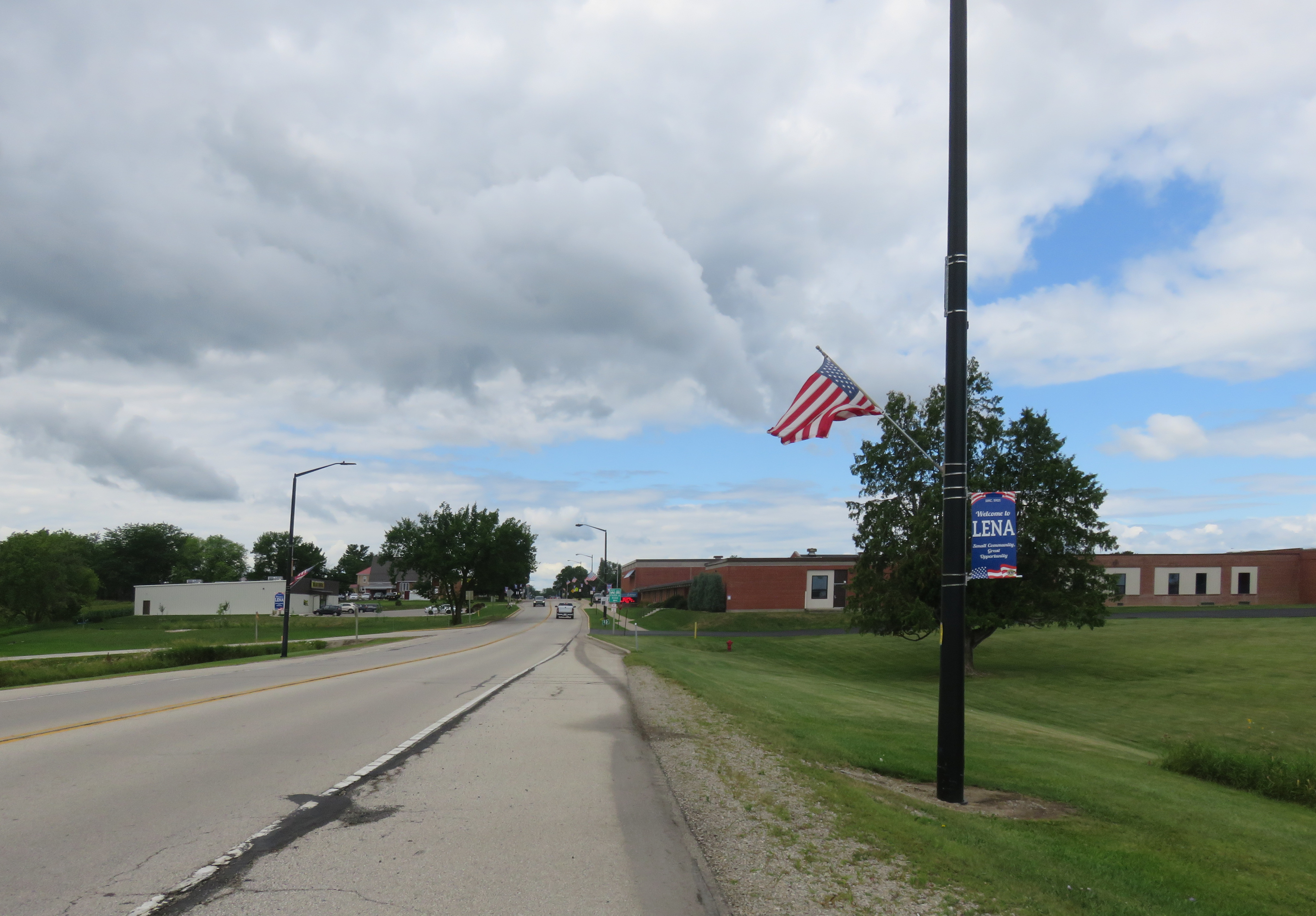

- Location of Lena in Oconto County, Wisconsin.
- Coordinates: 44°59′7″N 88°3′22″W
- Country: United States
- State: Wisconsin
- County: Oconto

Area
  - Total: 1.07 sq mi (2.76 km^{2})
  - Land: 1.06 sq mi (2.75 km^{2})
  - Water: 0.0039 sq mi (0.01 km^{2})
- Elevation: 699 ft (213 m)

Population (2020)
  - Total: 537
  - Density: 506/sq mi (195/km^{2})
- Time zone: UTC-6 (Central (CST))
  - Summer (DST): UTC-5 (CDT)
- Zip Code: 54139
- Area code: 920
- FIPS code: 55-43350
- GNIS feature ID: 1567968
- Website: http://villageoflena.net/

Lena is a village in Oconto County, Wisconsin, United States. The population was 537 at the 2020 census. It is part of the Green Bay Metropolitan Statistical Area. The village is located within the Town of Lena.

== History ==
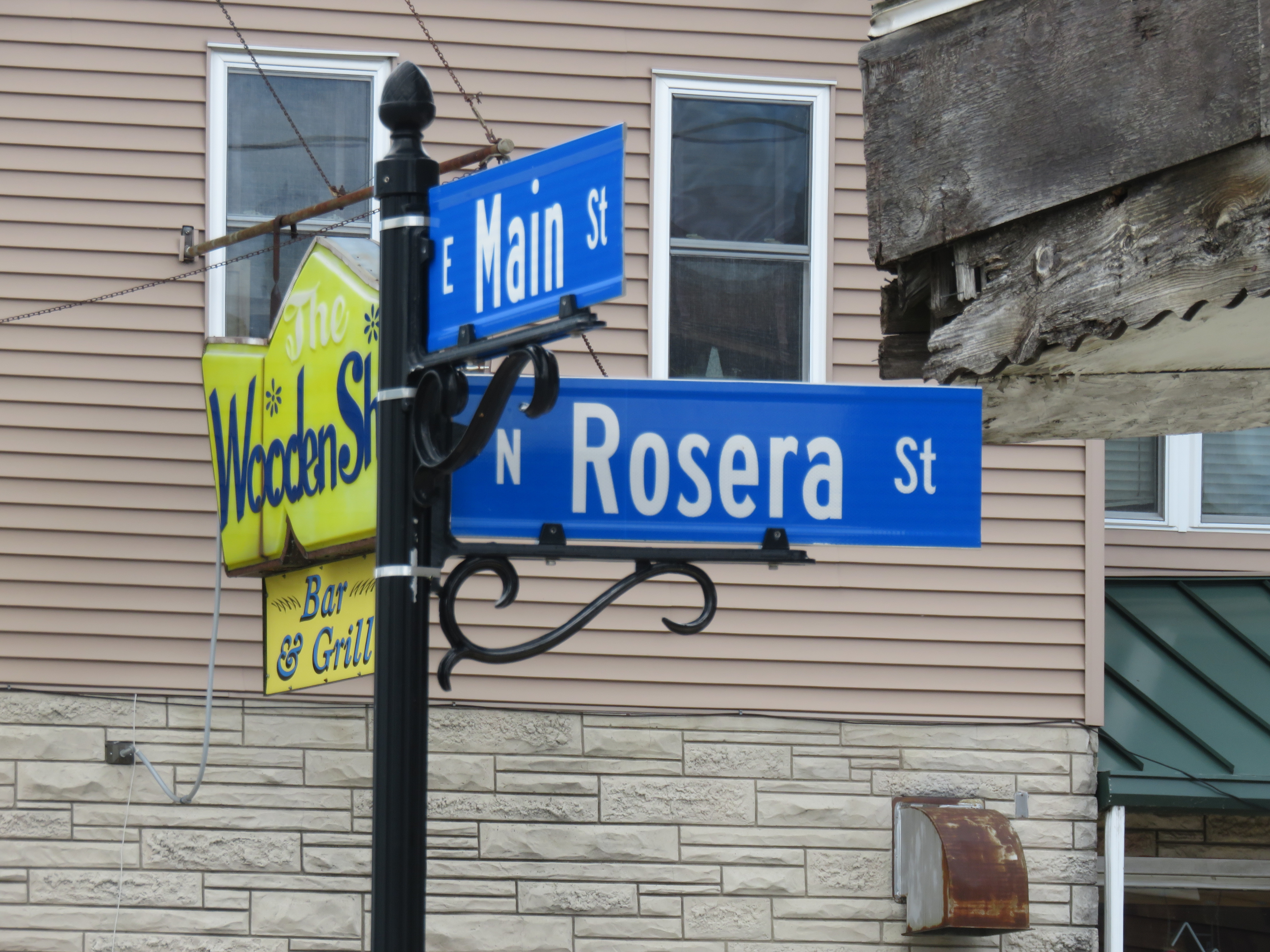
Rosera Street in Lena, named after an early settler

Originally known as Maple Valley, Lena owes its location to the railroads. The first white family at the site that became Lena was the French-Swiss immigrant Étienne Clement Roserens together with his French-Canadian wife Vitaline née Tessier, who established a homestead in October 1872. Their daughter Anna Rosera Hendricks was the first white child born in the settlement. Rosera Street in Lena is named after the family. Other early white settlers in this vicinity arrived in the late 1870s and consisted primarily of French Canadian immigrants. One French Canadian immigrant was Samuel LeRoy, also known as Samuel or Sam King. King homesteaded land in 1872 and donated land for the first schoolhouse. As was common in other areas populated by French-Canadians during this era, most of the Maple Valley residents engaged in small-scale logging, concentrating their work and their homes along Jones Creek, a tributary of the Little River. By 1879 the community had become large enough to support a post office and, since the name "Maple Valley" had already been assigned to another Wisconsin post office, the recommendation of a new name fell to Oconto Postmaster George R. Hall. Hall submitted the first name of his future wife (Helena "Lena" Louisa McCartney) to the federal postmaster, and the choice was approved. Lena was incorporated as a village in 1921.

== Geography ==
Lena is located at 44°57′1″N 88°3′3″W (44.950453, -88.051066).

According to the United States Census Bureau, the village has a total area of 1.03 square miles (2.67 km^{2}), all land.

== Churches ==
The first church in Lena was the Seventh Day Adventist church, built in 1880. A Catholic church was built in 1882, and a Methodist church in 1888. A Lutheran church was built in the early 20th century.

== Demographics ==
Historical population
Census	Pop.	Note	%±
1930	413		—
1940	469		13.6%
1950	526		12.2%
1960	506		−3.8%
1970	569		12.5%
1980	585		2.8%
1990	590		0.9%
2000	510		−13.6%
2010	564		10.6%
2020	537		−4.8%
U.S. Decennial Census

=== 2010 census ===
As of the census of 2010, there were 564 people, 251 households, and 143 families residing in the village. The population density was 547.6 inhabitants per square mile (211.4/km^{2}). There were 275 housing units at an average density of 267.0 per square mile (103.1/km^{2}). The racial makeup of the village was 96.6% White, 1.4% Native American, 0.2% Asian, 0.2% from other races, and 1.6% from two or more races. Hispanic or Latino people of any race were 1.8% of the population.

There were 251 households, of which 29.1% had children under the age of 18 living with them, 41.0% were married couples living together, 11.6% had a female householder with no husband present, 4.4% had a male householder with no wife present, and 43.0% were non-families. 39.0% of all households were made up of individuals, and 14% had someone living alone who was 65 years of age or older. The average household size was 2.25 and the average family size was 3.00.

The median age in the village was 37.8 years. 23.4% of residents were under the age of 18; 8.5% were between the ages of 18 and 24; 27.1% were from 25 to 44; 25.5% were from 45 to 64; and 15.4% were 65 years of age or older. The gender makeup of the village was 50.4% male and 49.6% female.

=== 2000 census ===
As of the census of 2000, there were 510 people, 216 households, and 139 families residing in the village. The population density was 576.8 people per square mile (223.8/km^{2}). There were 221 housing units at an average density of 249.9 per square mile (97.0/km^{2}). The racial makeup of the village was 99.22% White, 0.20% Black or African American, 0.20% from other races, and 0.39% from two or more races. 0.98% of the population were Hispanic or Latino of any race.

There were 216 households, out of which 31.0% had children under the age of 18 living with them, 44.4% were married couples living together, 12.5% had a female householder with no husband present, and 35.2% were non-families. 27.3% of all households were made up of individuals, and 10.2% had someone living alone who was 65 years of age or older. The average household size was 2.36 and the average family size was 2.86.

In the village, the population was spread out, with 26.1% under the age of 18, 8.8% from 18 to 24, 30.0% from 25 to 44, 18.4% from 45 to 64, and 16.7% who were 65 years of age or older. The median age was 35 years. For every 100 females, there were 109.9 males. For every 100 females age 18 and over, there were 104.9 males.

The median income for a household in the village was $30,000, and the median income for a family was $34,750. Males had a median income of $28,750 versus $21,591 for females. The per capita income for the village was $19,262. About 11.7% of families and 13.7% of the population were below the poverty line, including 26.4% of those under age 18 and 7.1% of those age 65 or over.

== Notable people ==
- Lloyd R. Baumgart, Wisconsin State Representative
- Wayland Becker, football player
- Ron Klimko, music educator and composer
- Carl Schoenebeck, Wisconsin State Representative
