= Breed, Wisconsin =

- Town
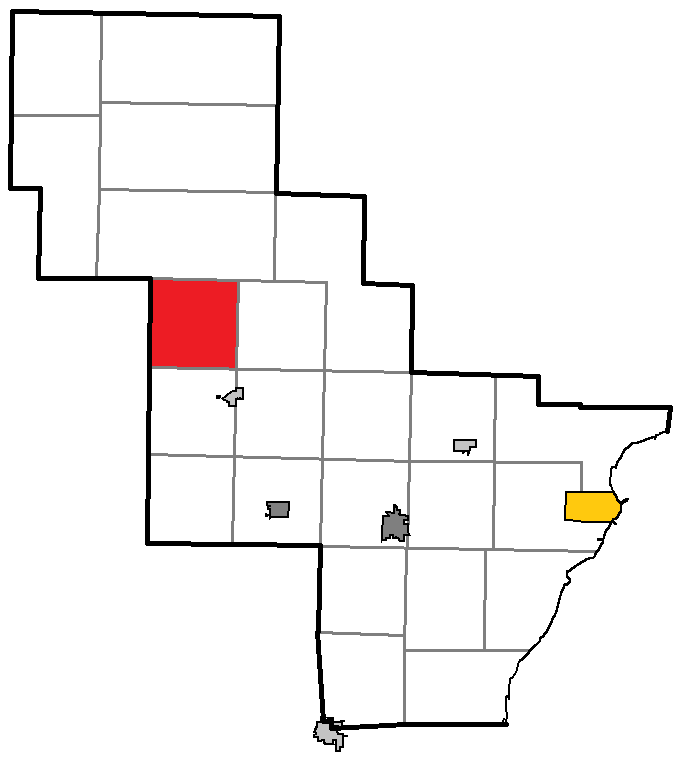
- Location of Breed, within Oconto County
- Coordinates: 45°4′34″N 88°24′53″W
- Country: United States
- State: Wisconsin
- County: Oconto

Area
  - Total: 35.8 sq mi (92.6 km^{2})
  - Land: 35.6 sq mi (92.1 km^{2})
  - Water: 0.23 sq mi (0.6 km^{2})
- Elevation: 902 ft (275 m)

Population (2020)
  - Total: 698
  - Density: 19.6/sq mi (7.58/km^{2})
- Time zone: UTC-6 (Central (CST))
  - Summer (DST): UTC-5 (CDT)
- FIPS code: 55-09425
- GNIS feature ID: 1582854
- Website: https://townofbreedwi.org/

Breed is a town in Oconto County, Wisconsin, United States. The population was 698 at the 2020 census. The Piso Airport is located in the town and was established in 1968.

== Communities ==
- Breed is an unincorporated community located along WIS 32 near the junction with County Road AA. The latter road serves as a connector to WIS 55 in rural parts of neighboring Menominee County.
- Logan is an unincorporated community along Logan Road east of WIS 32. The immediate area comprises only a few houses near the Oconto River. The community established a post office in 1889 until it was discontinued in 1928.

== History ==
A post office called Breed was established in 1888, and remained in operation until it was discontinued in 1966. The community was named for its first postmaster, George M. Breed. The first settler in the area was James Knight. Most settlers came on foot along ancient Native American foot trails. The first road in the county was built in 1860. The first road built in Breed was built in 1885. It became the route of Highway 32 and Highway 64. The general store opened in 1887 as a result of the surrounding areas being quickly settled for farming. The Chicago and Northwestern was built in 1896 from Mountain. The center of the community was the North Star hotel. The town had a school, multiple churches, a cheese factory, and many farms. Since the businesses closed, the town has become a small community with only houses remaining.

== Geography ==
According to the United States Census Bureau, the town has a total area of 35.8 square miles (92.6 km^{2}), of which 35.5 square miles (92.1 km^{2}) is land and 0.2 square mile (0.6 km^{2}) (0.64%) is water. The latitude of Breed is 45.073N and the longitude is −88.424W. Breed sits at a mean elevation of 902 feet.

== Demographics ==
As of the census of 2000, there were 657 people, 268 households, and 195 families residing in the town. The population density was 18.5 people per square mile (7.1/km^{2}). There were 322 housing units at an average density of 9.1 per square mile (3.5/km^{2}). The racial makeup of the town was 97.26% White, 0.15% African American, 1.07% Native American, 0.15% Asian, and 1.37% from two or more races.

There were 268 households, out of which 26.9% had children under the age of 18 living with them, 64.9% were married couples living together, 4.1% had a female householder with no husband present, and 27.2% were non-families. 22.8% of all households were made up of individuals, and 9.7% had someone living alone who was 65 years of age or older. The average household size was 2.45 and the average family size was 2.90.

In the town, the population was spread out, with 24.4% under the age of 18, 4.1% from 18 to 24, 25.1% from 25 to 44, 27.7% from 45 to 64, and 18.7% who were 65 years of age or older. The median age was 43 years. For every 100 females, there were 101.5 males. For every 100 females age 18 and over, there were 105.4 males.

The median income for a household in the town was $36,103, and the median income for a family was $40,469. Males had a median income of $31,875 versus $25,750 for females. The per capita income for the town was $18,704. About 3.8% of families and 6.9% of the population were below the poverty line, including 10.2% of those under age 18 and 1.5% of those age 65 or over.
