= Lena (town), Wisconsin =

Civil town in Oconto County, Wisconsin

Lena, Wisconsin
- Town
- Town of Lena
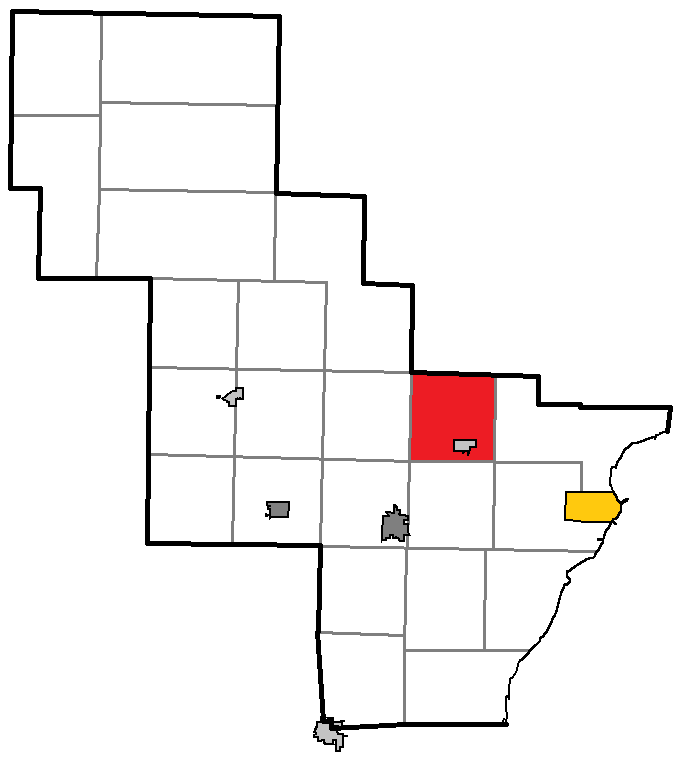
- Location of Lena, within Oconto County
- Coordinates: 44°57′03″N 88°02′54″W
- Country: United States
- State: Wisconsin
- County: Oconto

Area
  - Total: 33.1 sq mi (86 km^{2})
  - Land: 33.1 sq mi (86 km^{2})
  - Water: 0.003 sq mi (0.0078 km^{2})

Population (2020)
  - Total: 743
  - Density: 22.4/sq mi (8.67/km^{2})
- Time zone: UTC-6 (Central (CST))
  - Summer (DST): UTC-5 (CDT)
- Area code(s): 920 & 274
- GNIS feature ID: 1583541

Lena is a town in Oconto County, Wisconsin, United States. The population was 743 at the 2020 census. The Village of Lena is adjacent to the town.

== Geography ==
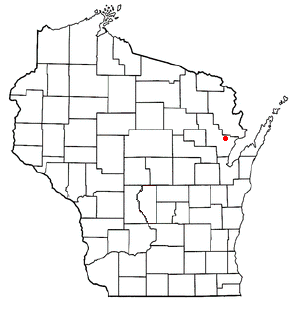
Location of Lena (town), Wisconsin

According to the United States Census Bureau, the town has a total area of 33.4 square miles (86.5 km^{2}), all land.

== Demographics ==
As of the census of 2000, there were 769 people, 289 households, and 219 families residing in the town. The population density was 23.0 people per square mile (8.9/km^{2}). There were 303 housing units at an average density of 9.1 per square mile (3.5/km^{2}). The racial makeup of the town was 99.22% White, 0.26% Black or African American, 0.13% Native American, 0.13% Asian, 0.13% from other races, and 0.13% from two or more races. 0.39% of the population were Hispanic or Latino of any race.

There were 289 households, out of which 34.3% had children under the age of 18 living with them, 63.3% were married couples living together, 8.0% had a female householder with no husband present, and 24.2% were non-families. 20.1% of all households were made up of individuals, and 5.9% had someone living alone who was 65 years of age or older. The average household size was 2.63 and the average family size was 3.05.

In the town, the population was spread out, with 26.9% under the age of 18, 6.4% from 18 to 24, 32.8% from 25 to 44, 21.1% from 45 to 64, and 12.9% who were 65 years of age or older. The median age was 38 years. For every 100 females, there were 112.4 males. For every 100 females age 18 and over, there were 113.7 males.

The median income for a household in the town was $45,556, and the median income for a family was $52,083. Males had a median income of $33,571 versus $25,729 for females. The per capita income for the town was $18,649. About 7.1% of families and 7.1% of the population were below the poverty line, including 6.2% of those under age 18 and 10.4% of those age 65 or over.
