= Morgan, Wisconsin =

- Town
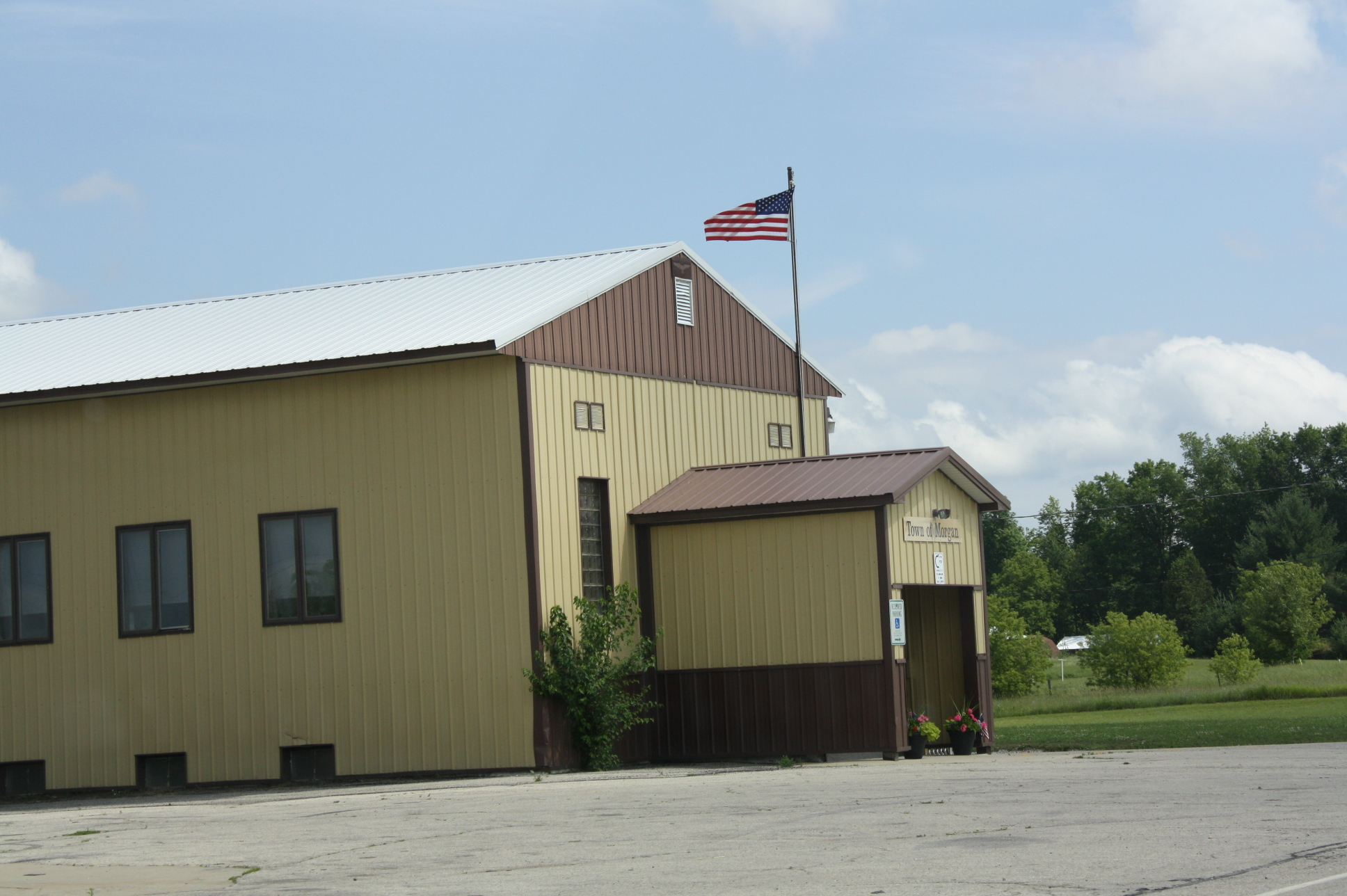
- Town hall

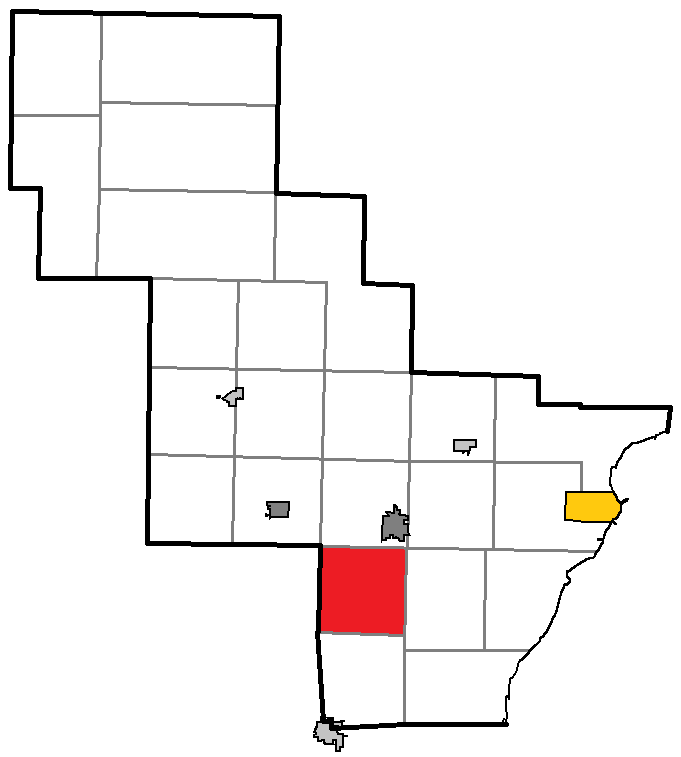
- Location of Morgan, within Oconto County
- Coordinates: 44°48′26″N 88°10′40″W
- Country: United States
- State: Wisconsin
- County: Oconto

Area
  - Total: 35.6 sq mi (92.3 km^{2})
  - Land: 35.6 sq mi (92.1 km^{2})
  - Water: 0.077 sq mi (0.2 km^{2})
- Elevation: 784 ft (239 m)

Population (2020)
  - Total: 985
  - Density: 27.7/sq mi (10.7/km^{2})
- Time zone: UTC-6 (Central (CST))
  - Summer (DST): UTC-5 (CDT)
- FIPS code: 55-54200
- GNIS feature ID: 1583751
- Website: http://townofmorgan.org/

Morgan is a town in Oconto County, Wisconsin, United States. The population was 985 for the 2020 census. Morgan had an operating post office from 1881 to 1907.

== Communities ==
- Morgan is an unincorporated community located at the intersection of County Roads C and E.
- Sampson is an unincorporated community located at the intersection of County Roads C and D.

== Geography ==
According to the United States Census Bureau, the town has a total area of 35.6 square miles (92 km^{2}), of which 35.6 square miles (92 km^{2}) is land and 0.1 square miles (0.26 km^{2}) (0.22%) is water.

== Demographics ==
At the 2020 census, there were 985 people, 488 households and 448 families residing in the town. The population density was 24.8 per square mile (9.6/km^{2}). There were 488 housing units at an average density of 9.4 per square mile (3.6/km^{2}). The racial make-up of the town was 95.13% White, 0.20% African American, 0% Native American, 0.2% Asian and 2.74% from two or more races. Hispanic or Latino of any race were 1.93% of the population.

There were 488 households, of which 15.2% had children under the age of 18 living with them, 65.6% were married couples living together, 17.2% had a female householder with no husband present and 6.76% were non-families. 19.0% of all households were made up of individuals and 1.84% had someone living alone who was 65 years of age or older. The average household size was 2.75 and the average family size was 2.71.

26.5% of the population were under the age of 18, 7.6% from 18 to 24, 28.5% from 25 to 44, 25.7% from 45 to 64 and 11.7% were 65 years of age or older. The median age was 38 years. For every 100 females, there were 99.5 males. For every 100 females age 18 and over, there were 102.5 males.

The median household income was $92,500 and the median family income was $52,875. Males had a median income of $36,641 and females $26,875. The per capita income was $20,321. None of the families and 5.9% of the population were living below the poverty line, including 3.7% of those under 18, 4.6% of those between 18 and 64 and 9.6% of those over 64.
