= Oconto Falls (town), Wisconsin =

Oconto Falls, Wisconsin
- Town
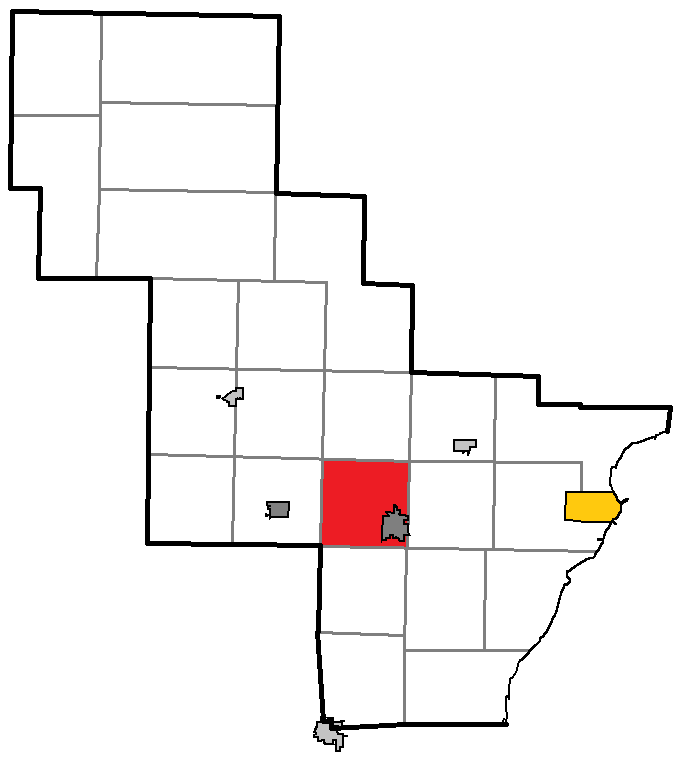
- Location of Oconto Falls, within Oconto County
- Coordinates: 44°53′25″N 88°11′7″W
- Country: United States
- State: Wisconsin
- County: Oconto

Area
  - Total: 32.8 sq mi (84.9 km^{2})
  - Land: 32.2 sq mi (83.5 km^{2})
  - Water: 0.54 sq mi (1.4 km^{2})
- Elevation: 820 ft (250 m)

Population (2020)
  - Total: 1,259
  - Density: 39.1/sq mi (15.1/km^{2})
- Time zone: UTC-6 (Central (CST))
  - Summer (DST): UTC-5 (CDT)
- Area code: 920
- FIPS code: 55-59425
- GNIS feature ID: 1583853
- Website: https://townofocontofalls.org/

Oconto Falls is a town in Oconto County, Wisconsin, United States. The population was 1,259 at the 2020 census. The City of Oconto Falls is located within the town.

== Geography ==
According to the United States Census Bureau, the town has a total area of 32.8 square miles (84.9 km^{2}), of which 32.2 square miles (83.5 km^{2}) is land and 0.5 square mile (1.4 km^{2}) (1.62%) is water.

== Demographics ==
As of the census of 2000, there were 1,139 people, 434 households, and 329 families residing in the town. The population density was 35.3 people per square mile (13.6/km^{2}). There were 484 housing units at an average density of 15.0 per square mile (5.8/km^{2}). The racial makeup of the town was 99.30% White, 0.09% Black or African American, 0.18% Native American, and 0.44% from two or more races. 0.18% of the population were Hispanic or Latino of any race.

There were 434 households, out of which 34.1% had children under the age of 18 living with them, 66.6% were married couples living together, 5.5% had a female householder with no husband present, and 24.0% were non-families. 18.4% of all households were made up of individuals, and 6.7% had someone living alone who was 65 years of age or older. The average household size was 2.62 and the average family size was 3.00.

In the town, the population was spread out, with 25.0% under the age of 18, 7.1% from 18 to 24, 29.7% from 25 to 44, 27.0% from 45 to 64, and 11.2% who were 65 years of age or older. The median age was 38 years. For every 100 females, there were 98.4 males. For every 100 females age 18 and over, there were 100.9 males.

The median income for a household in the town was $49,531, and the median income for a family was $53,304. Males had a median income of $36,797 versus $24,524 for females. The per capita income for the town was $17,654. About 4.2% of families and 7.3% of the population were below the poverty line, including 7.1% of those under age 18 and 13.6% of those age 65 or over.
