= Oconto County, Wisconsin =

County in Wisconsin, United States

- County
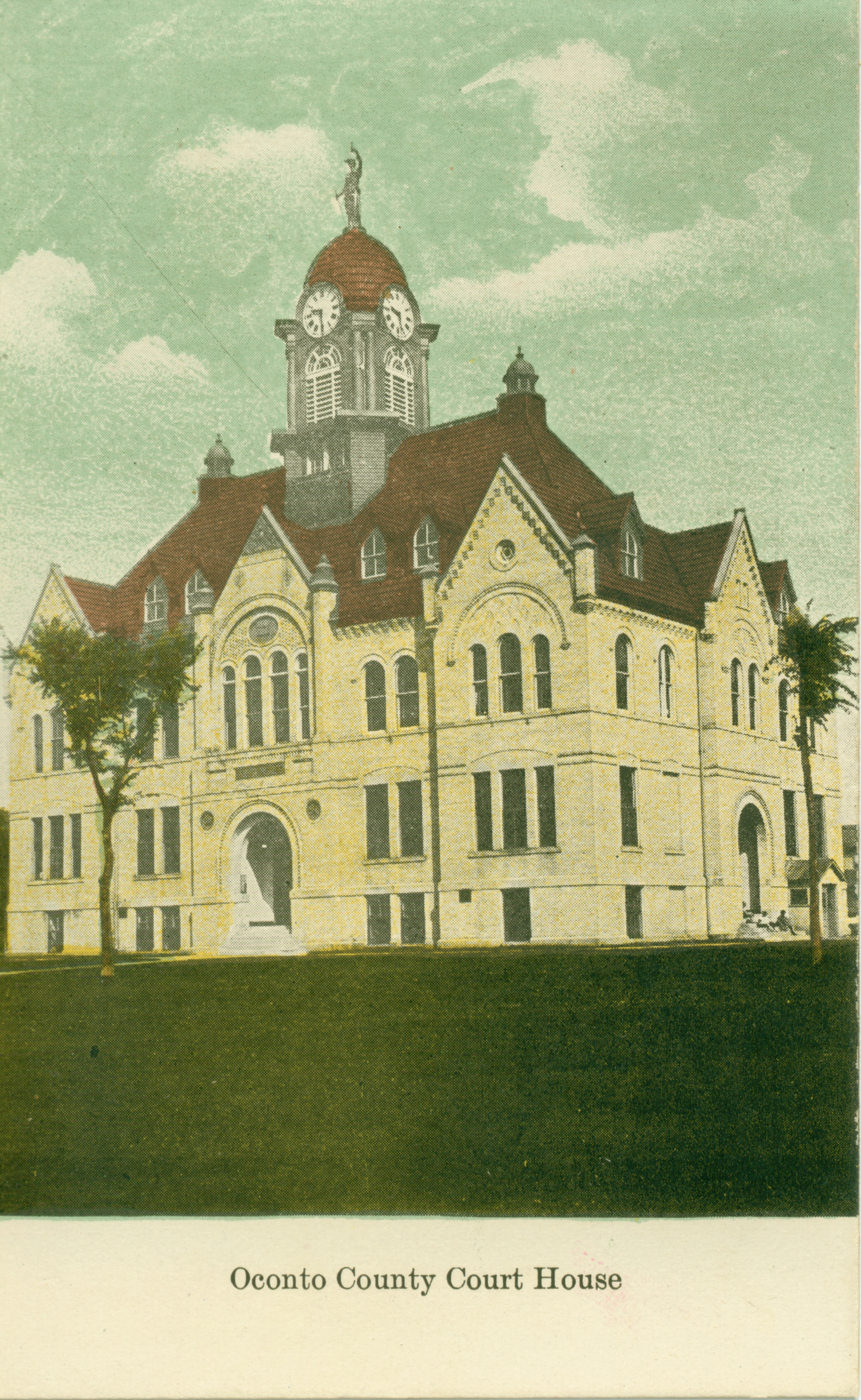
- The Oconto County Courthouse, circa 1910

- Location within the U.S. state of Wisconsin
- Coordinates: 44°59′N 88°14′W
- Country: United States
- State: Wisconsin
- Founded: 1854
- Named for: Oconto River
- Seat: Oconto
- Largest city: Oconto

Area
  - Total: 1,149 sq mi (2,980 km^{2})
  - Land: 998 sq mi (2,580 km^{2})
  - Water: 151 sq mi (390 km^{2}) 13%

Population (2020)
  - Total: 38,965
  - Estimate (2025): 40,195 ▲
  - Density: 39.1/sq mi (15.1/km^{2})
- Time zone: UTC−6 (Central)
  - Summer (DST): UTC−5 (CDT)
- Congressional district: 8th
- Website: www.ocontocountywi.gov

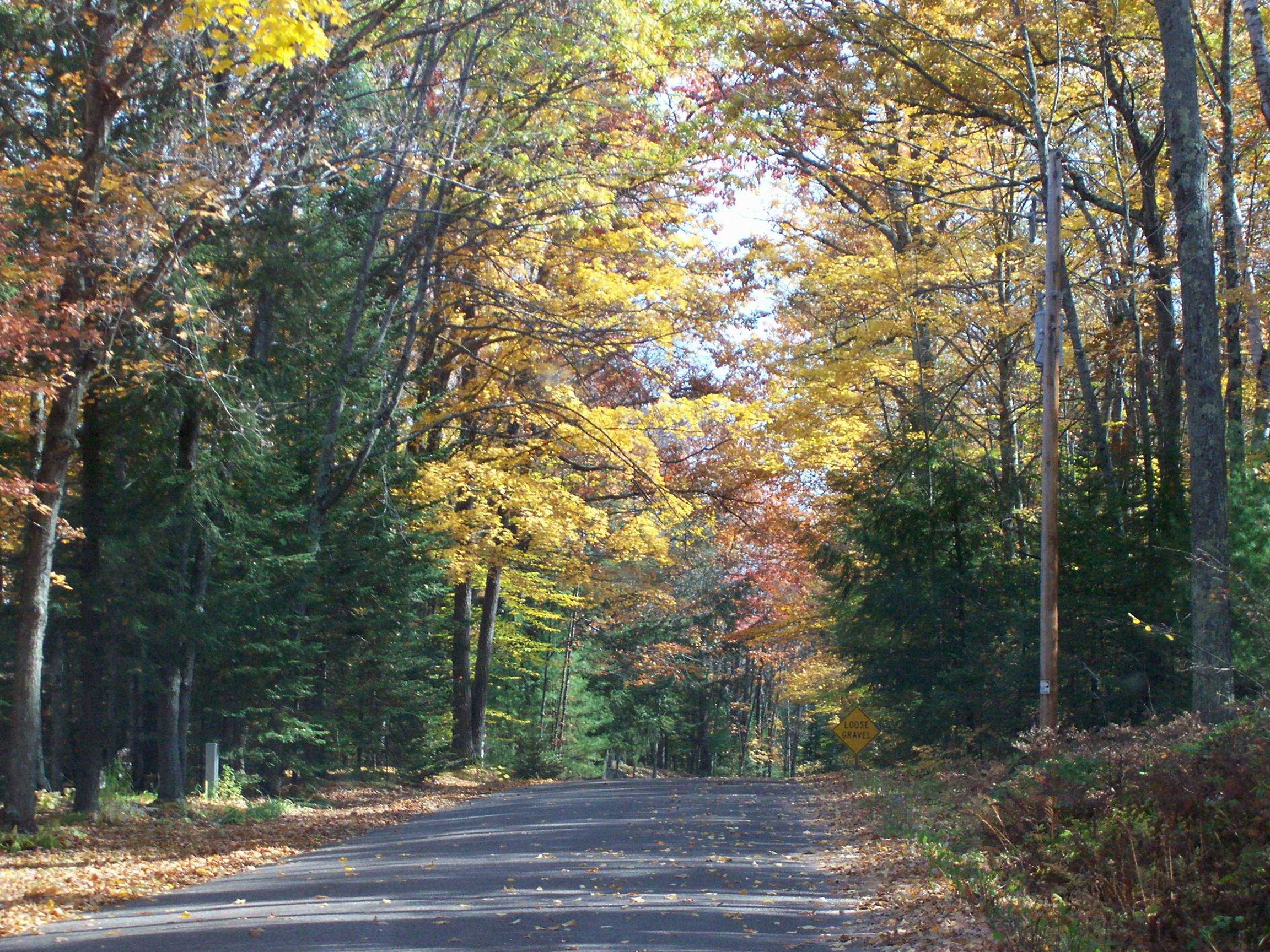
Rural Oconto County in fall

Oconto County is a county in the U.S. state of Wisconsin. As of the 2020 census, the population was 38,965. Its county seat is Oconto. The county was established in 1851.

Oconto County is part of the Green Bay metropolitan area and the Green Bay–Shawano combined statistical area.

== History ==
First visited by French explorers in the 17th century, Oconto County is among the oldest settlements in Wisconsin. Father Claude-Jean Allouez of the Roman Catholic Jesuit order said the first Mass in Oconto. Among the first settlers was Joseph Tourtilott, who explored much of the Oconto River watershed. Oconto County was created in 1851 and organized in 1854.

== Geography ==
According to the U.S. Census Bureau, the county has a total area of 1,149 square miles (2,980 km^{2}), of which 998 square miles (2,580 km^{2}) is land and 151 square miles (390 km^{2}) (13%) is water.

=== Adjacent counties ===
- Marinette County – northeast
- Door County – southeast, border is in Green Bay
- Brown County – south
- Shawano County – southwest
- Menominee County – west
- Langlade County – west
- Forest County – northwest

=== Major highways ===
- U.S. Highway 41
- U.S. Highway 141
- Highway 22 (Wisconsin)
- Highway 32 (Wisconsin)
- Highway 64 (Wisconsin)

=== Railroads ===
- Canadian National
- Escanaba and Lake Superior Railroad

=== Airport ===
J. Douglas Bake Memorial Airport (KOCQ) serves the county and surrounding communities.

=== National protected area ===
- Nicolet National Forest (part)

== Demographics ==
Historical population
Census	Pop.	Note	%±
1860	3,592		—
1870	9,321		159.5%
1880	9,848		5.7%
1890	15,009		52.4%
1900	20,874		39.1%
1910	25,657		22.9%
1920	27,104		5.6%
1930	26,386		−2.6%
1940	27,075		2.6%
1950	26,238		−3.1%
1960	25,110		−4.3%
1970	25,553		1.8%
1980	28,947		13.3%
1990	30,226		4.4%
2000	35,634		17.9%
2010	37,660		5.7%
2020	38,965		3.5%
2025 (est.)	40,195	▲	3.2%
U.S. Decennial Census; 1790–1960 1900–1990; 1990–2000 2010 2020

=== Racial and ethnic composition ===
Oconto County, Wisconsin – Racial and ethnic composition Note: the US Census treats Hispanic/Latino as an ethnic category. This table excludes Latinos from the racial categories and assigns them to a separate category. Hispanics/Latinos may be of any race.
Race / ethnicity (NH = Non-Hispanic)	Pop 1980	Pop 1990	Pop 2000	Pop 2010	Pop 2020	% 1980	% 1990	% 2000	% 2010	% 2020
White alone (NH)	28,661	29,855	34,707	36,167	36,170	99.01%	98.77%	97.40%	96.04%	92.83%
Black or African American alone (NH)	7	18	48	68	91	0.02%	0.06%	0.13%	0.18%	0.23%
Native American or Alaska Native alone (NH)	151	211	269	443	463	0.52%	0.70%	0.75%	1.18%	1.19%
Asian alone (NH)	25	33	68	110	110	0.09%	0.11%	0.19%	0.29%	0.28%
Native Hawaiian or Pacific Islander alone (NH)	x	x	4	3	0	x	x	0.01%	0.01%	0.00%
Other race alone (NH)	9	2	12	11	66	0.03%	0.01%	0.03%	0.03%	0.17%
Mixed race or Multiracial (NH)	x	x	286	339	1,217	x	x	0.80%	0.90%	3.12%
Hispanic or Latino (any race)	94	107	240	519	848	0.32%	0.35%	0.67%	1.38%	2.18%
Total	28,947	30,226	35,634	37,660	38,965	100.00%	100.00%	100.00%	100.00%	100.00%

=== 2020 census ===
As of the census of 2020, the population was 38,965. The population density was 39.1 people per square mile (15.1 people/km^{2}). There were 23,754 housing units at an average density of 23.8 units per square mile (9.2 units/km^{2}). The racial makeup of the county was 93.5% White, 1.3% Native American, 0.3% Asian, 0.2% Black or African American, 0.8% from other races, and 3.8% from two or more races. Ethnically, the population was 2.2% Hispanic or Latino of any race.

2000 Census Age Pyramid for Oconto County

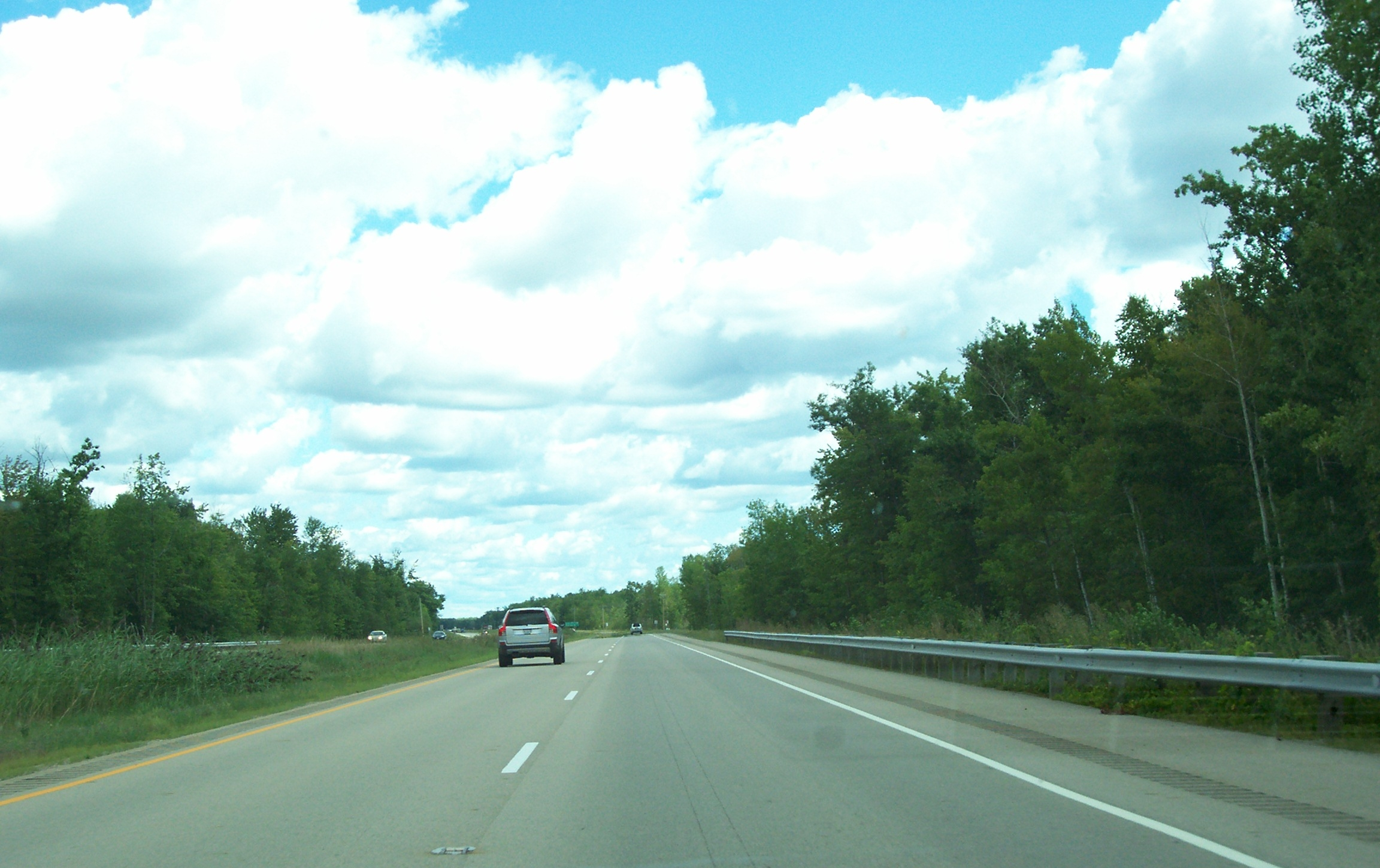
Woods along U.S. Route 41

=== 2000 census ===
As of the census of 2000, there were 35,634 people, 13,979 households, and 10,050 families residing in the county. The population density was 36 people per square mile (14 people/km^{2}). There were 19,812 housing units at an average density of 20 units per square mile (7.7 units/km^{2}). The racial makeup of the county was 97.76% White, 0.13% Black or African American, 0.78% Native American, 0.20% Asian, 0.01% Pacific Islander, 0.24% from other races, and 0.88% from two or more races. 0.67% of the population were Hispanic or Latino of any race. 42.9% were of German, 11.8% Polish, 6.0% French and 5.6% American ancestry.

There were 13,979 households, out of which 32.20% had children under the age of 18 living with them, 60.70% were married couples living together, 6.90% had a female householder with no husband present, and 28.10% were non-families. 23.50% of all households were made up of individuals, and 10.70% had someone living alone who was 65 years of age or older. The average household size was 2.52 and the average family size was 2.97.

In the county, the population was spread out, with 25.70% under the age of 18, 6.40% from 18 to 24, 28.70% from 25 to 44, 24.00% from 45 to 64, and 15.10% who were 65 years of age or older. The median age was 39 years. For every 100 females, there were 101.30 males. For every 100 females age 18 and over, there were 99.70 males.

In 2017, there were 353 births, giving a general fertility rate of 61.0 births per 1000 women aged 15–44, the 28th lowest rate out of all 72 Wisconsin counties. Additionally, there were 14 reported induced abortions performed on women of Oconto County residence in 2017.

== Communities ==
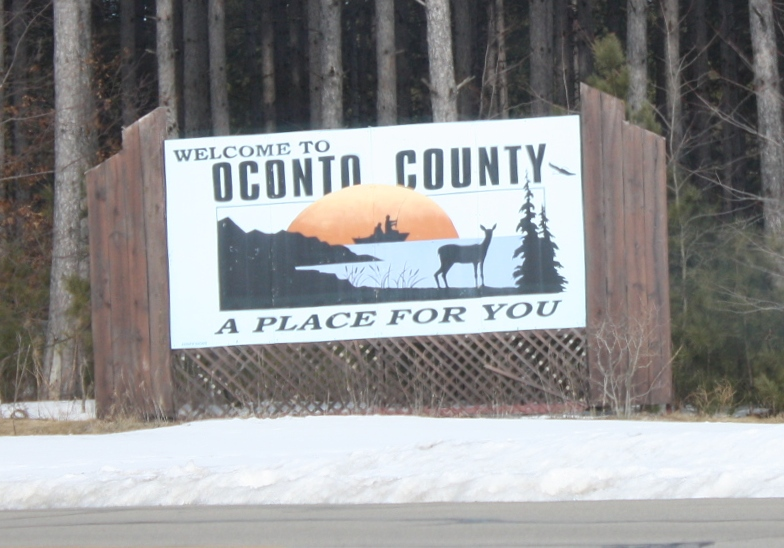
Oconto County sign

=== Cities ===
- Gillett
- Oconto (county seat)
- Oconto Falls

=== Villages ===
- Lena
- Pulaski (mostly in Brown County and Shawano County)
- Suring

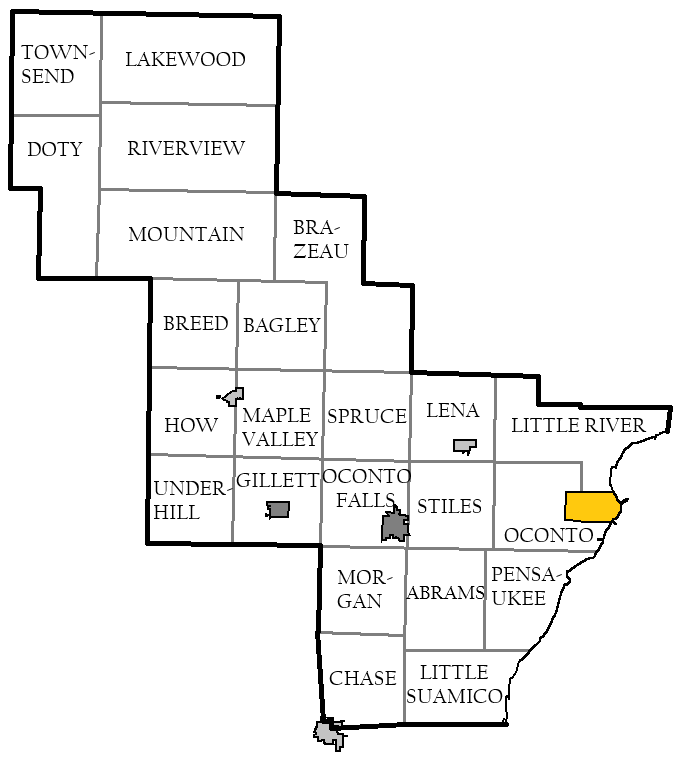
Towns of Oconto County

=== Towns ===
- Abrams
- Bagley
- Brazeau
- Breed
- Chase
- Doty
- Gillett
- How
- Lakewood
- Lena
- Little River
- Little Suamico
- Maple Valley
- Morgan
- Mountain
- Oconto Falls
- Oconto
- Pensaukee
- Riverview
- Spruce
- Stiles
- Townsend
- Underhill

=== Census-designated places ===
- Abrams
- Lakewood
- Mountain
- Sobieski
- Townsend

=== Unincorporated communities ===
- Bonita
- Breed
- Brookside
- Chase
- County Line (partial)
- Cullen
- Frostville
- Hayes
- Hickory Corners
- Hintz
- Kelly Brook
- Klondike
- Little Suamico
- Logan
- Morgan
- Mosling
- Oak Orchard
- Pensaukee
- Sampson
- Sobieski Corners
- South Chase
- Spruce
- Stiles
- Stiles Junction
- Underhill
- Kingston

=== Native American community ===
- Forest County Potawatomi Community

=== Ghost town/neighborhood ===
- Leighton
- Pine Stump

== Politics ==
United States presidential election results for Oconto County, Wisconsin
Year	Republican		Democratic		Third party(ies)	
Year	No.	%	No.	%	No.	%
1892	1,275	43.31%	1,499	50.92%	170	5.77%
1896	2,836	67.08%	1,290	30.51%	102	2.41%
1900	2,754	69.72%	1,117	28.28%	79	2.00%
1904	3,279	73.70%	1,024	23.02%	146	3.28%
1908	3,020	64.77%	1,453	31.16%	190	4.07%
1912	1,988	46.60%	1,523	35.70%	755	17.70%
1916	2,570	56.21%	1,892	41.38%	110	2.41%
1920	4,735	78.16%	1,030	17.00%	293	4.84%
1924	2,562	33.12%	602	7.78%	4,571	59.10%
1928	4,661	51.91%	4,253	47.37%	65	0.72%
1932	2,915	30.80%	6,440	68.04%	110	1.16%
1936	3,774	34.20%	6,729	60.98%	531	4.81%
1940	6,238	53.88%	5,273	45.55%	66	0.57%
1944	5,923	57.38%	4,348	42.12%	51	0.49%
1948	4,865	52.61%	4,269	46.17%	113	1.22%
1952	7,807	69.58%	3,382	30.14%	31	0.28%
1956	6,836	64.95%	3,632	34.51%	57	0.54%
1960	6,223	55.15%	5,045	44.71%	15	0.13%
1964	4,420	40.94%	6,360	58.92%	15	0.14%
1968	5,680	53.74%	3,737	35.36%	1,152	10.90%
1972	6,511	59.38%	4,041	36.85%	413	3.77%
1976	6,232	47.84%	6,541	50.21%	254	1.95%
1980	8,292	58.01%	5,352	37.44%	649	4.54%
1984	8,714	61.70%	5,289	37.45%	121	0.86%
1988	7,084	51.65%	6,549	47.75%	83	0.61%
1992	5,720	35.59%	5,898	36.70%	4,455	27.72%
1996	5,389	38.81%	6,723	48.42%	1,773	12.77%
2000	8,706	52.46%	7,260	43.75%	630	3.80%
2004	11,043	55.79%	8,534	43.11%	217	1.10%
2008	8,755	46.16%	9,927	52.34%	286	1.51%
2012	10,741	54.09%	8,865	44.64%	253	1.27%
2016	13,345	66.04%	5,940	29.40%	921	4.56%
2020	16,226	69.89%	6,715	28.93%	274	1.18%
2024	17,675	70.95%	6,967	27.97%	270	1.08%

In the latter half of the 20th century and the early 21st century, Oconto County was a bellwether in presidential elections, supporting the winning candidate in every election from 1964 to 2008. In 2012, however, the county voted for Republican Mitt Romney despite Romney losing the state of Wisconsin and the national election. In 2016, the county swung 27 percentage points to the right, giving Republican Donald Trump a margin of victory of more than 37 percentage points and a vote share of 66%. In 2020, Trump improved his performance, carrying Oconto by a margin of 41 percentage points and winning 69.9% of the vote to Democrat Joe Biden's 28.9%. This was the best result for any presidential nominee in Oconto County since 1920, when Warren Harding received 78.2% of the vote, and remains the third strongest performance of any candidate ever. Trump broke this record again in 2024, when he received over 70% of the county's vote.

== See also ==
- National Register of Historic Places listings in Oconto County, Wisconsin
