= Maple Valley, Wisconsin =

- Town
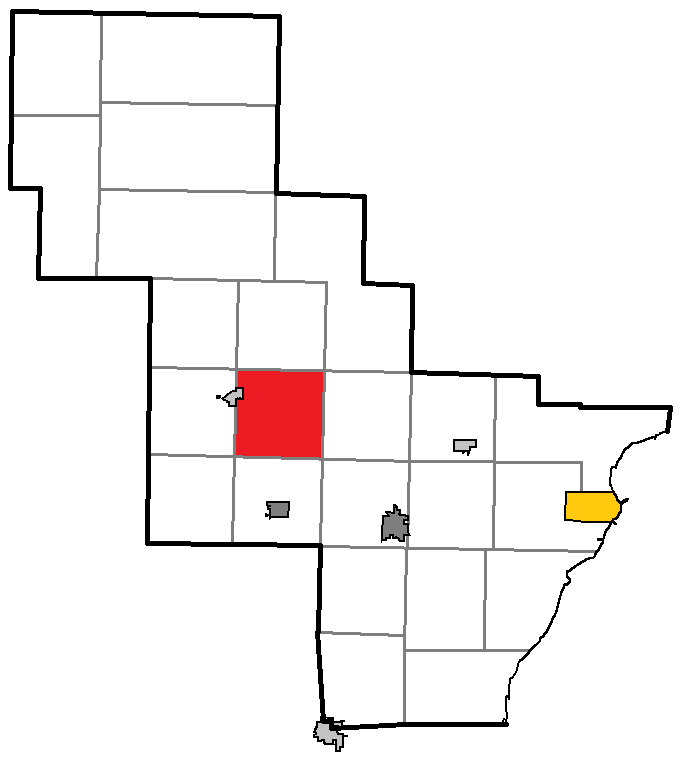
- Location of Maple Valley, within Oconto County
- Coordinates: 44°58′34″N 88°17′45″W
- Country: United States
- State: Wisconsin
- County: Oconto

Area
  - Total: 35.4 sq mi (91.7 km^{2})
  - Land: 35.3 sq mi (91.4 km^{2})
  - Water: 0.12 sq mi (0.3 km^{2})
- Elevation: 873 ft (266 m)

Population (2020)
  - Total: 647
  - Density: 18.3/sq mi (7.08/km^{2})
- Time zone: UTC-6 (Central (CST))
  - Summer (DST): UTC-5 (CDT)
- FIPS code: 55-49000
- GNIS feature ID: 1583647

Maple Valley is a town in Oconto County, Wisconsin, United States. The population was 647 at the 2020 census.

The town did have an operating post office from 1878 until 1906.

== Communities ==
- Frostville is an unincorporated community located at the intersection of County Roads M and Z. The community was named after Andrew C. Frost, who established a general store in the community in 1880. The community had a school, bar, and a hotel. All that stands of the community today is an abandoned cemetery and some houses. The Maple Valley Town Hall is located in the community.
- Hickory Corners is an unincorporated community at the intersection of County Roads G and M. The first postmaster submitted the name "Hickory Hill" for the settlement, but the name was shortened by the postal service to Hickory and later changed to Hickory Corners. The community had a post office from 1880 to 1906.

== Geography ==
According to the United States Census Bureau, the town has a total area of 35.4 square miles (91.7 km^{2}), of which 35.3 square miles (91.4 km^{2}) is land and 0.1 square mile (0.3 km^{2}) (0.37%) is water.

== Demographics ==
As of the census of 2000, there were 670 people, 267 households, and 198 families residing in the town. The population density was 19.0 people per square mile (7.3/km^{2}). There were 323 housing units at an average density of 9.2 per square mile (3.5/km^{2}). The racial makeup of the town was 98.81% White, 0.75% Native American, and 0.45% from two or more races. Hispanic or Latino of any race were 0.30% of the population.

There were 267 households, out of which 31.1% had children under the age of 18 living with them, 65.5% were married couples living together, 5.6% had a female householder with no husband present, and 25.5% were non-families. 21.0% of all households were made up of individuals, and 10.9% had someone living alone who was 65 years of age or older. The average household size was 2.51 and the average family size was 2.90.

In the town, the population was spread out, with 23.6% under the age of 18, 6.7% from 18 to 24, 29.0% from 25 to 44, 24.2% from 45 to 64, and 16.6% who were 65 years of age or older. The median age was 40 years. For every 100 females, there were 104.9 males. For every 100 females age 18 and over, there were 102.4 males.

The median income for a household in the town was $35,795, and the median income for a family was $38,500. Males had a median income of $27,031 versus $24,219 for females. The per capita income for the town was $16,985. About 5.7% of families and 6.4% of the population were below the poverty line, including 5.1% of those under age 18 and 7.5% of those age 65 or over.
