= Oconto (town), Wisconsin =

Oconto, Wisconsin
- Town
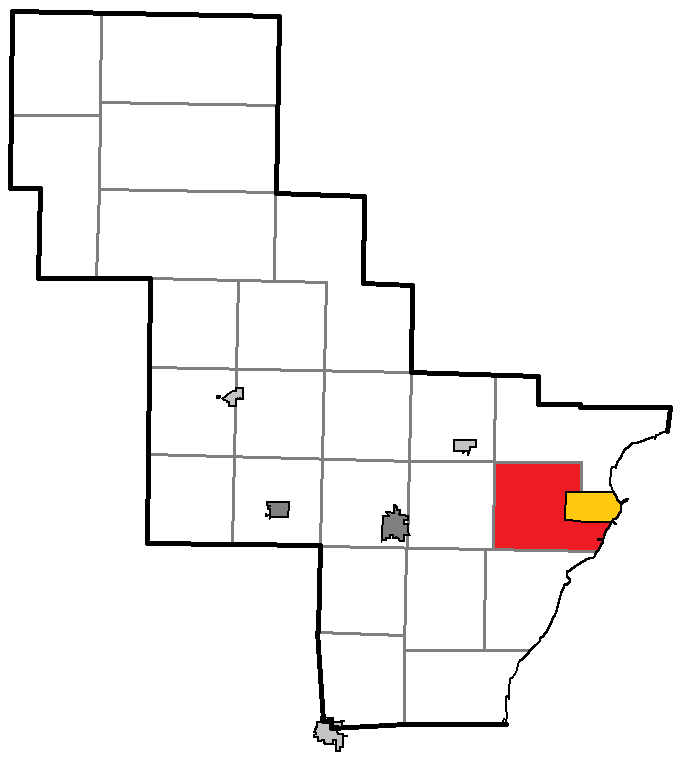
- Location of Oconto, within Oconto County
- Coordinates: 44°52′53″N 87°56′3″W
- Country: United States
- State: Wisconsin
- County: Oconto

Area
  - Total: 36.7 sq mi (95.0 km^{2})
  - Land: 36.3 sq mi (94.0 km^{2})
  - Water: 0.39 sq mi (1.0 km^{2})
- Elevation: 643 ft (196 m)

Population (2020)
  - Total: 1,340
  - Density: 36.9/sq mi (14.3/km^{2})
- Time zone: UTC-6 (Central (CST))
  - Summer (DST): UTC-5 (CDT)
- Area code: 920
- FIPS code: 55-59375
- GNIS feature ID: 1583851

Oconto is a town in Oconto County, Wisconsin, United States. The population was 1,340 at the 2020 census. The City of Oconto is located partially within the town.

== Geography ==
According to the United States Census Bureau, the town has a total area of 36.7 square miles (95.0 km^{2}), of which 36.3 square miles (94.0 km^{2}) is land and 0.4 square mile (1.0 km^{2}) (1.06%) is water.

== Demographics ==
As of the census of 2000, there were 1,251 people, 454 households, and 365 families residing in the town. The population density was 34.5 people per square mile (13.3/km^{2}). There were 491 housing units at an average density of 13.5 per square mile (5.2/km^{2}). The racial makeup of the town was 96.00% White, 0.24% Black or African American, 0.88% Native American, 0.72% Asian, 0.56% from other races, and 1.60% from two or more races. 1.60% of the population were Hispanic or Latino of any race.

There were 454 households, out of which 35.5% had children under the age of 18 living with them, 68.7% were married couples living together, 5.9% had a female householder with no husband present, and 19.4% were non-families. 16.7% of all households were made up of individuals, and 6.8% had someone living alone who was 65 years of age or older. The average household size was 2.76 and the average family size was 3.07.

In the town, the population was spread out, with 28.7% under the age of 18, 6.5% from 18 to 24, 27.7% from 25 to 44, 26.1% from 45 to 64, and 11.1% who were 65 years of age or older. The median age was 38 years. For every 100 females, there were 107.1 males. For every 100 females age 18 and over, there were 109.9 males.

The median income for a household in the town was $45,721, and the median income for a family was $48,472. Males had a median income of $35,132 versus $21,048 for females. The per capita income for the town was $18,373. About 2.7% of families and 5.8% of the population were below the poverty line, including 9.7% of those under age 18 and 7.0% of those age 65 or over.

== Notable people ==
- Samuel P. Walsh, educator and politician
