= Oconto Falls, Wisconsin =

- City
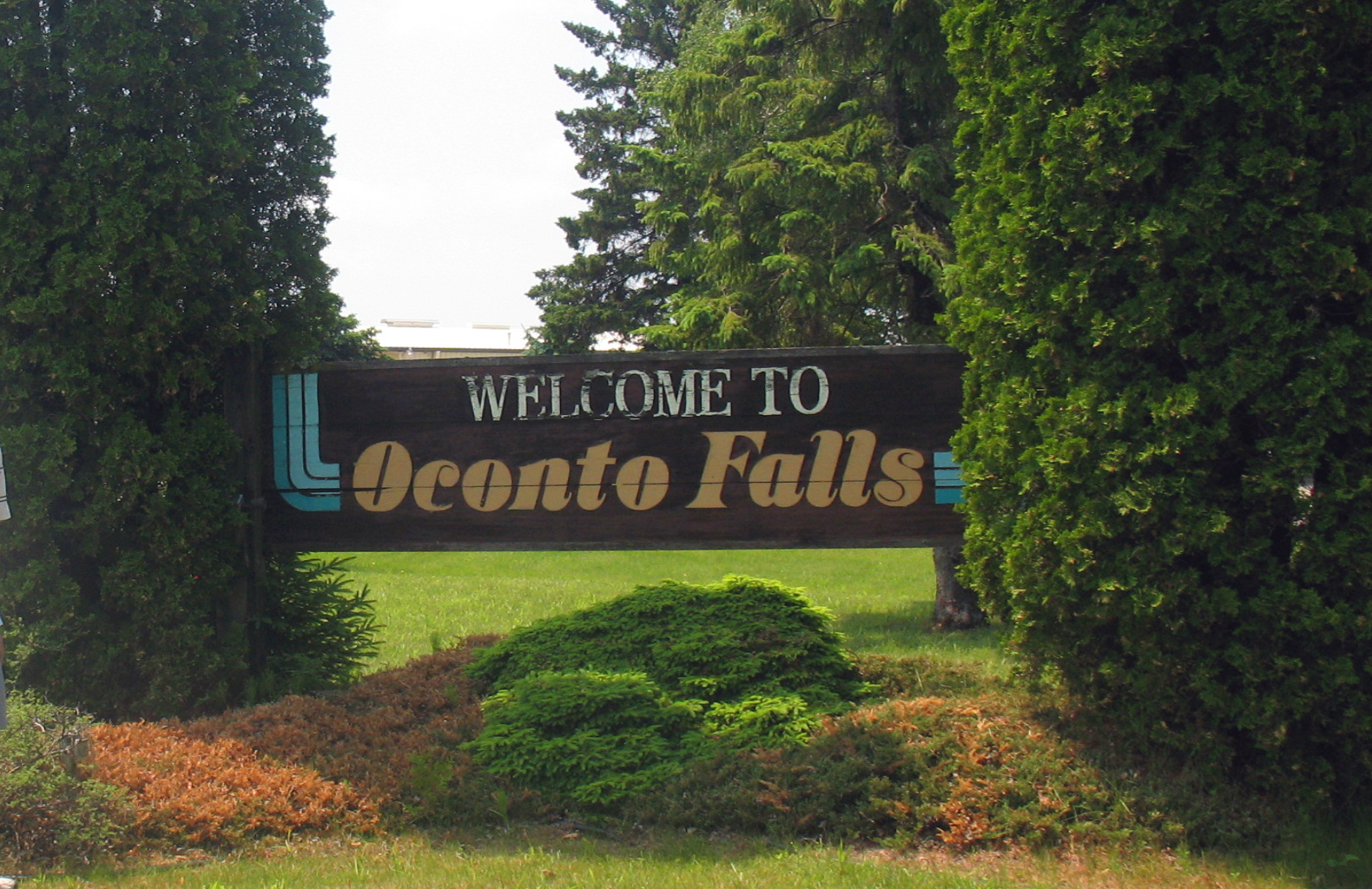
- Oconto Falls greeting sign, facing WI-22 South on the northeast side of town

- Location of Oconto Falls in Oconto County, Wisconsin

- Location within Wisconsin Location within the United States
- Coordinates: 44°52′30″N 88°8′34″W
- Country: United States
- State: Wisconsin
- County: Oconto

Government
  - Mayor: Clint Braun

Area
  - Total: 2.93 sq mi (7.59 km^{2})
  - Land: 2.71 sq mi (7.02 km^{2})
  - Water: 0.22 sq mi (0.57 km^{2})

Population (2020)
  - Total: 2,957
  - Density: 1,091.0/sq mi (421.23/km^{2})
- Time zone: UTC-6 (Central (CST))
  - Summer (DST): UTC-5 (CDT)
- ZIP codes: 54154
- Area code: 920
- FIPS code: 55-59400
- Website: Official website

Oconto Falls is a city in Oconto County, Wisconsin, United States. The population was 2,957 at the 2020 census. It is part of the Green Bay metropolitan area.

== History ==
The city was named for the original waterfalls on the Oconto River. According to Menominee storytelling, Manabozho threw a falls across the Oconto River "to protect the Menominee and to keep the sturgeon from getting to the Chippewa".

John and Almira Volk are considered the first European settlers of Oconto Falls, having moved to the region in 1846. Most early settlers were of German, Polish, and French descent. The Volk family established a sawmill along the river, and the lumber industry became the main source of employment.

A post office called Oconto Falls has been in operation since 1871, the same year the Peshtigo Fire destroyed a majority of buildings in the village. Later, a Methodist congregation was the first to build a church in 1889. The first bridge across the river was built in 1896, and in 1902, the falls was dammed to create a power source.

Shortly thereafter, Oconto Falls incorporated as a village on July 3, 1903. Anton Gustin, of Austrian heritage, came to the village and established a new pulp mill in 1908. It was constructed using his improved sulphate pulping process, which made Oconto Falls the location of the first commercial production of kraft paper in the United States. The village became a city in 1919.

== Geography ==
Oconto Falls is located at 44°52′29″N 88°8′34″W (44.874989, -88.1429).

According to the United States Census Bureau, the city has a total area of 2.95 square miles (7.64 km^{2}), of which 2.73 square miles (7.07 km^{2}) is land and 0.22 square miles (0.57 km^{2}) is water.

The city is separated into eastern and western sides by the Oconto River.

== Demographics ==
Historical population
Census	Pop.	Note	%±
1910	1,427		—
1920	1,914		34.1%
1930	1,921		0.4%
1940	1,888		−1.7%
1950	2,050		8.6%
1960	2,331		13.7%
1970	2,517		8.0%
1980	2,500		−0.7%
1990	2,584		3.4%
2000	2,843		10.0%
2010	2,891		1.7%
2020	2,957		2.3%
U.S. Decennial Census

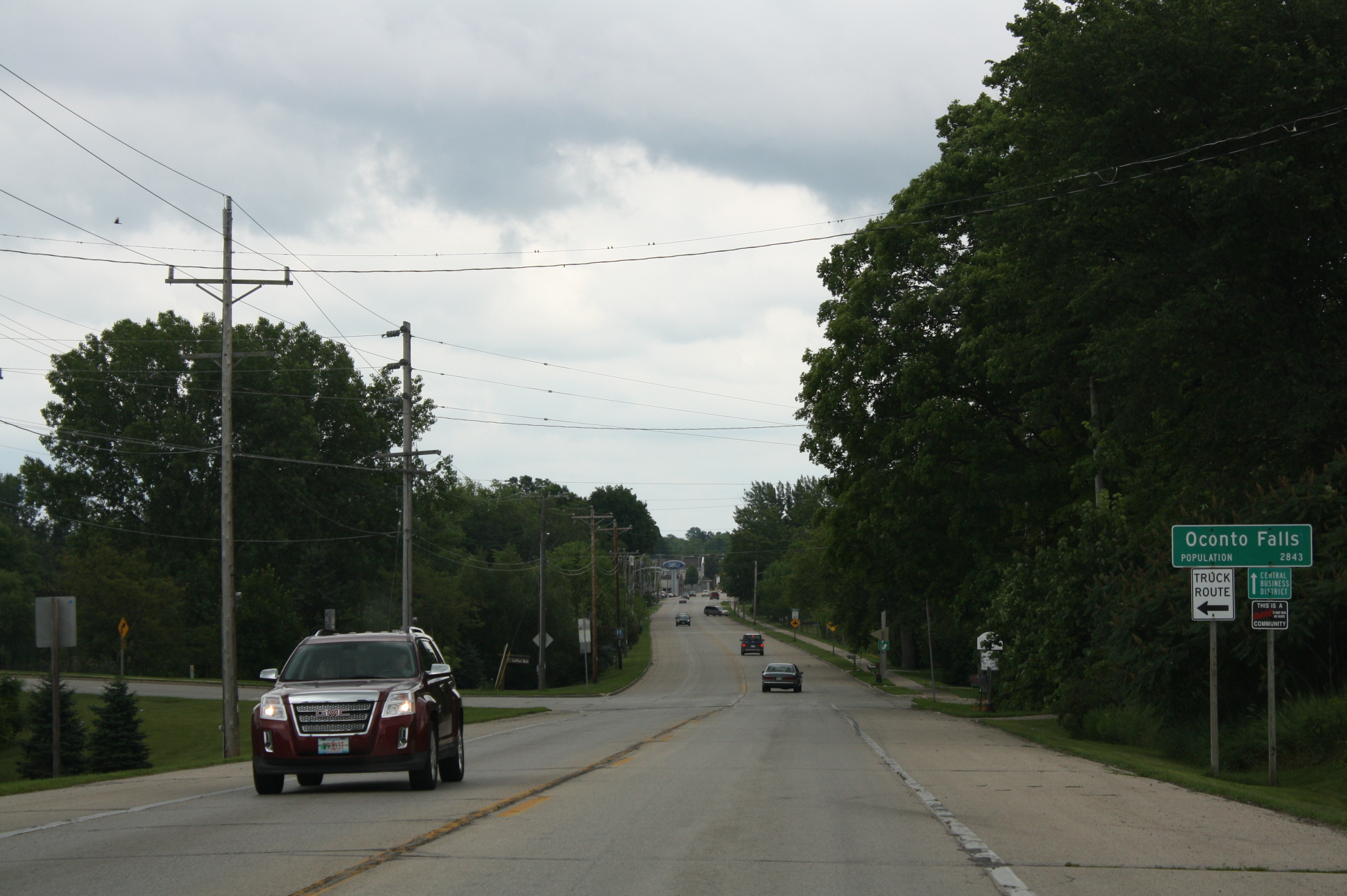
Looking southeast at the welcome sign for Oconto Falls

=== 2010 census ===
As of the census of 2010, there were 2,891 people, 1,251 households, and 753 families living in the city. The population density was 1,059.0 inhabitants per square mile (408.9/km^{2}). There were 1,333 housing units at an average density of 488.3 per square mile (188.5/km^{2}). The racial makeup of the city was 95.9% White, 0.1% African American, 1.5% Native American, 0.4% Asian, 0.3% from other races, and 1.7% from two or more races. Hispanic or Latino people of any race were 1.2% of the population.

There were 1,251 households, of which 33.1% had children under the age of 18 living with them, 40.3% were married couples living together, 14.5% had a female householder with no husband present, 5.4% had a male householder with no wife present, and 39.8% were non-families. 33.5% of all households were made up of individuals, and 12.8% had someone living alone who was 65 years of age or older. The average household size was 2.24 and the average family size was 2.81.

The median age in the city was 38.1 years. 24.5% of residents were under the age of 18; 7.8% were between the ages of 18 and 24; 26.8% were from 25 to 44; 23.9% were from 45 to 64; and 17.2% were 65 years of age or older. The gender makeup of the city was 47.7% male and 52.3% female.

=== 2000 census ===
As of the census of 2000, there were 2,843 people, 1,166 households, and 719 families living in the city. The population density was 1,056.5 people per square mile (408.1/km^{2}). There were 1,231 housing units at an average density of 457.4 per square mile (176.7/km^{2}). The racial makeup of the city was 98.21% White, 0.14% Black or African American, 0.49% Native American, 0.35% Asian, 0.11% from other races, and 0.70% from two or more races. 0.42% of the population were Hispanic or Latino of any race.

There were 1,166 households, out of which 32.5% had children under the age of 18 living with them, 46.6% were married couples living together, 10.5% had a female householder with no husband present, and 38.3% were non-families. 32.6% of all households were made up of individuals, and 15.9% had someone living alone who was 65 years of age or older. The average household size was 2.35 and the average family size was 2.97.

In the city, the population was spread out, with 26.4% under the age of 18, 6.7% from 18 to 24, 28.7% from 25 to 44, 19.0% from 45 to 64, and 19.3% who were 65 years of age or older. The median age was 37 years. For every 100 females, there were 90.8 males. For every 100 females age 18 and over, there were 85.1 males.

The median income for a household in the city was $34,884, and the median income for a family was $41,107. Males had a median income of $32,386 versus $22,616 for females. The per capita income for the city was $17,170. About 5.9% of families and 9.5% of the population were below the poverty line, including 10.7% of those under age 18 and 12.2% of those age 65 or over.

== Education ==
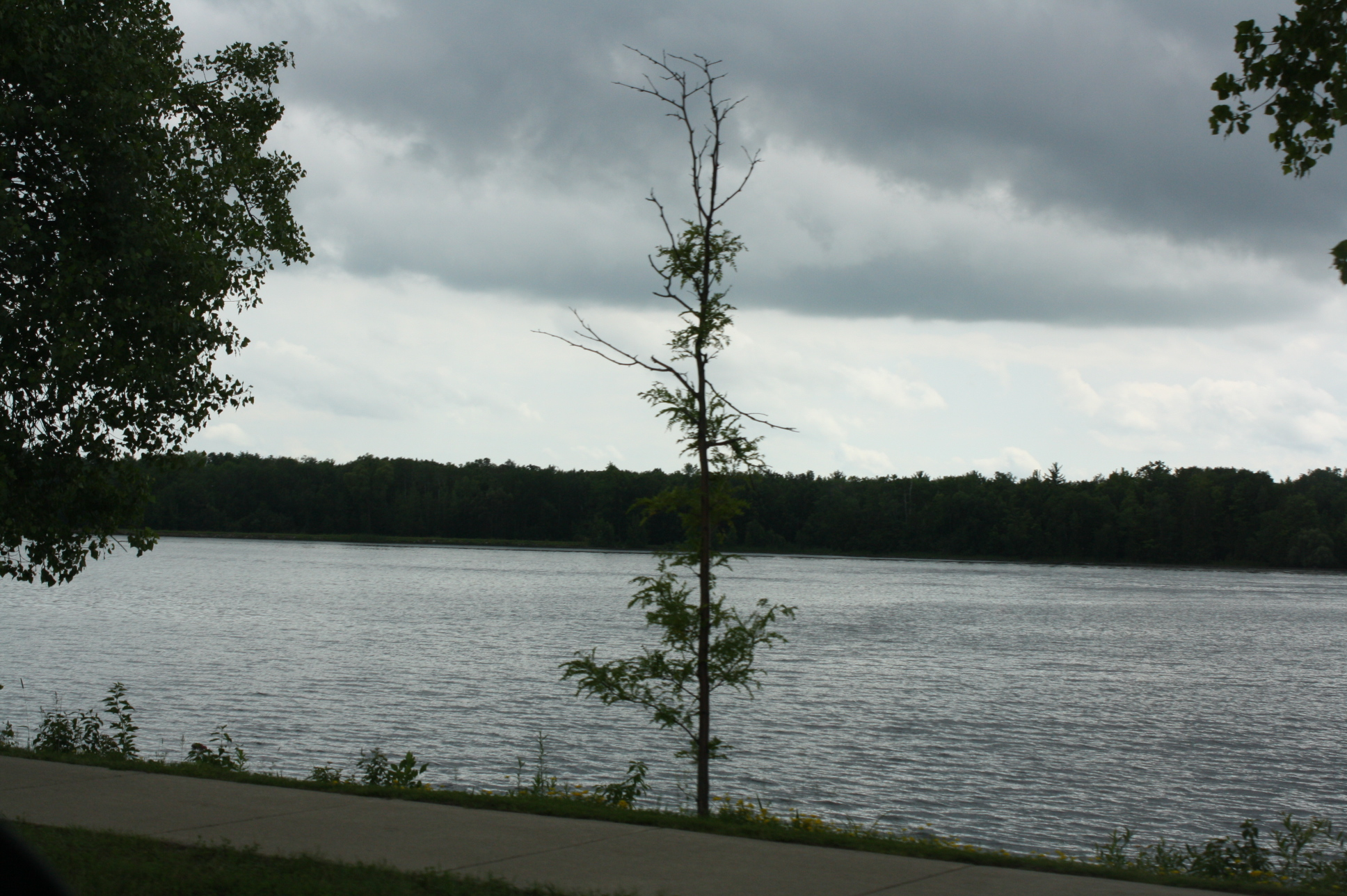
Oconto River in Oconto Falls

- Oconto Falls School District
- Oconto Falls High School
- Oconto Falls Elementary School
- Washington Middle School
- Abrams Elementary School
- St. Anthony Catholic School
- Jefferson Elementary School (closed 1996, demolished 2006)
- Spruce Charter School (closed 2012)

== Notable people ==
- Rusty Lemorande - director, screenwriter and actor
