= Gillett (town), Wisconsin =

Gillett, Wisconsin
- Town
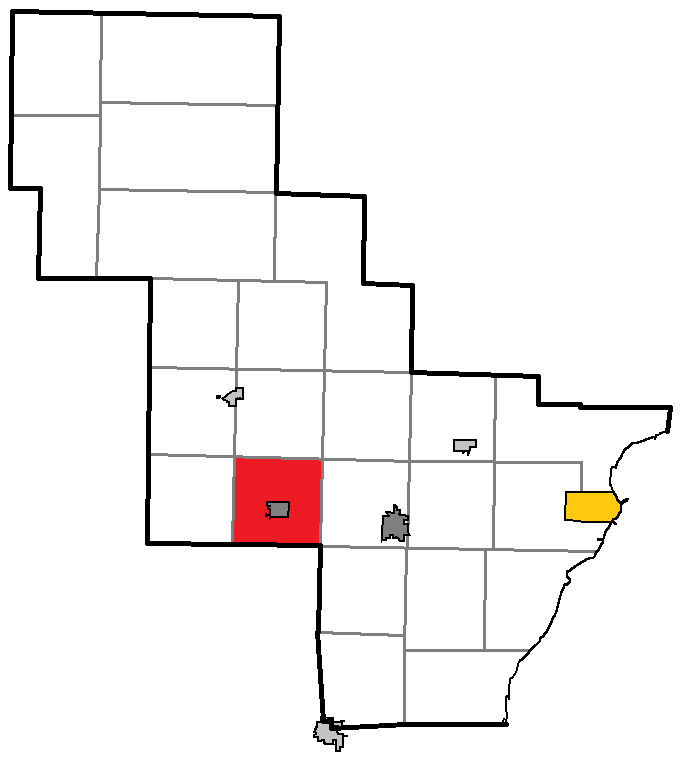
- Location of Gillett, within Oconto County
- Coordinates: 44°53′48″N 88°18′35″W
- Country: United States
- State: Wisconsin
- County: Oconto

Area
  - Total: 34.3 sq mi (88.9 km^{2})
  - Land: 33.4 sq mi (86.5 km^{2})
  - Water: 0.93 sq mi (2.4 km^{2})
- Elevation: 810 ft (247 m)

Population (2020)
  - Total: 989
  - Density: 29.6/sq mi (11.4/km^{2})
- Time zone: UTC-6 (Central (CST))
  - Summer (DST): UTC-5 (CDT)
- Area code: 920
- FIPS code: 55-29075
- GNIS feature ID: 1583274

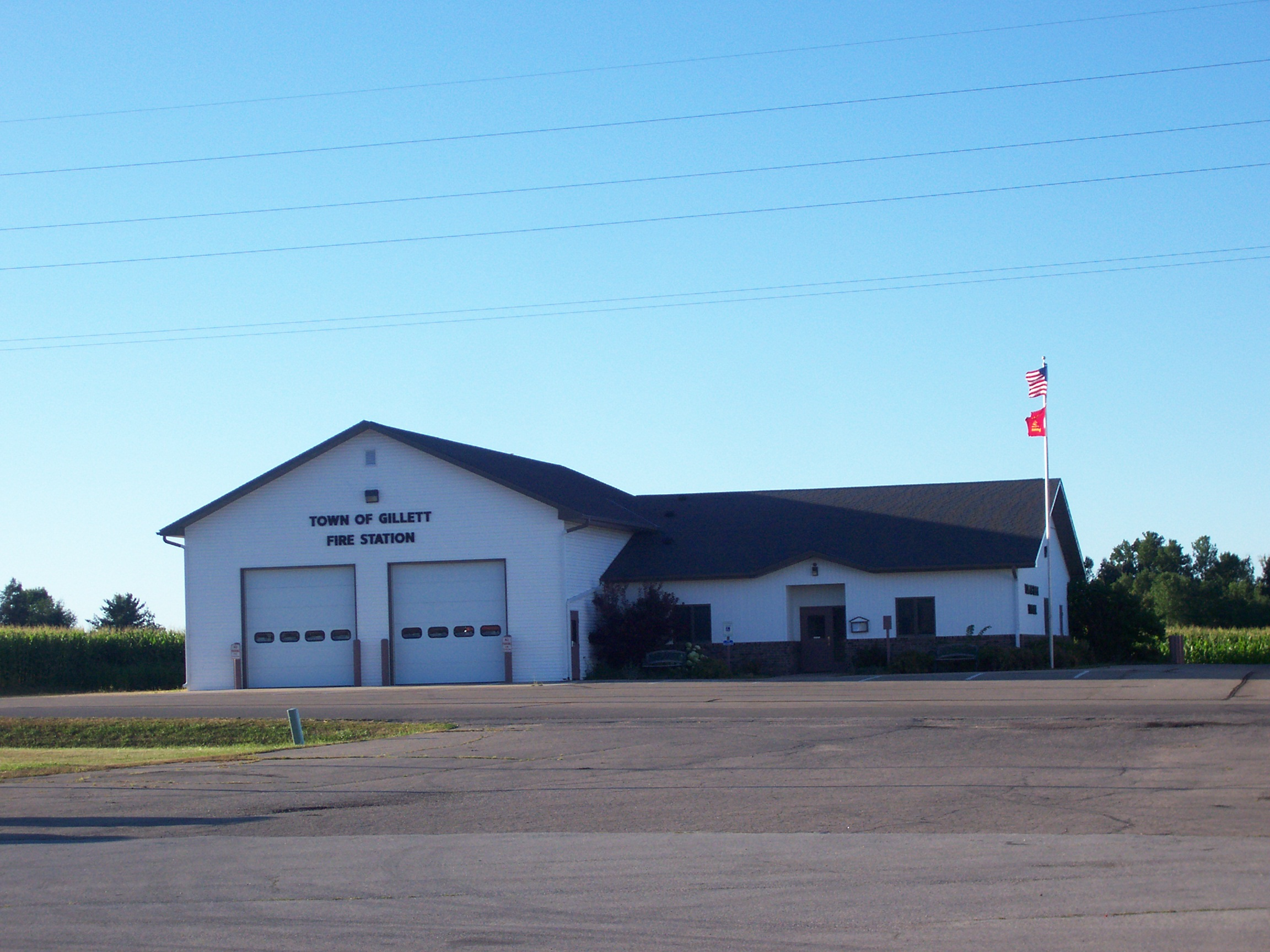
Town fire station along Wisconsin Highway 32

Gillett is a town in Oconto County, Wisconsin, United States. The population was 989 at the 2020 census. The City of Gillett is located within the town. The unincorporated community of Mosling is located partially in the town.

== Geography ==
According to the United States Census Bureau, the town has a total area of 34.3 square miles (88.9 km^{2}), of which 33.4 square miles (86.5 km^{2}) is land and 0.9 square mile (2.4 km^{2}) (2.68%) is water.

== Demographics ==
As of the census of 2000, there were 1,085 people, 404 households, and 313 families residing in the town. The population density was 32.5 people per square mile (12.5/km^{2}). There were 442 housing units at an average density of 13.2 per square mile (5.1/km^{2}). The racial makeup of the town was 97.97% White, 0.18% Native American, 0.18% Asian, 0.28% from other races, and 1.38% from two or more races. 0.37% of the population were Hispanic or Latino of any race.

There were 404 households, out of which 33.7% had children under the age of 18 living with them, 69.3% were married couples living together, 4.5% had a female householder with no husband present, and 22.5% were non-families. 19.1% of all households were made up of individuals, and 9.2% had someone living alone who was 65 years of age or older. The average household size was 2.69 and the average family size was 3.07.

In the town, the population was spread out, with 26.5% under the age of 18, 6.9% from 18 to 24, 26.2% from 25 to 44, 26.8% from 45 to 64, and 13.5% who were 65 years of age or older. The median age was 38 years. For every 100 females, there were 104.3 males. For every 100 females age 18 and over, there were 101.3 males.

The median income for a household in the town was $41,053, and the median income for a family was $44,135. Males had a median income of $35,179 versus $20,000 for females. The per capita income for the town was $19,381. About 3.4% of families and 5.2% of the population were below the poverty line, including 4.6% of those under age 18 and 5.9% of those age 65 or over.
