= Underhill, Wisconsin =

- Town
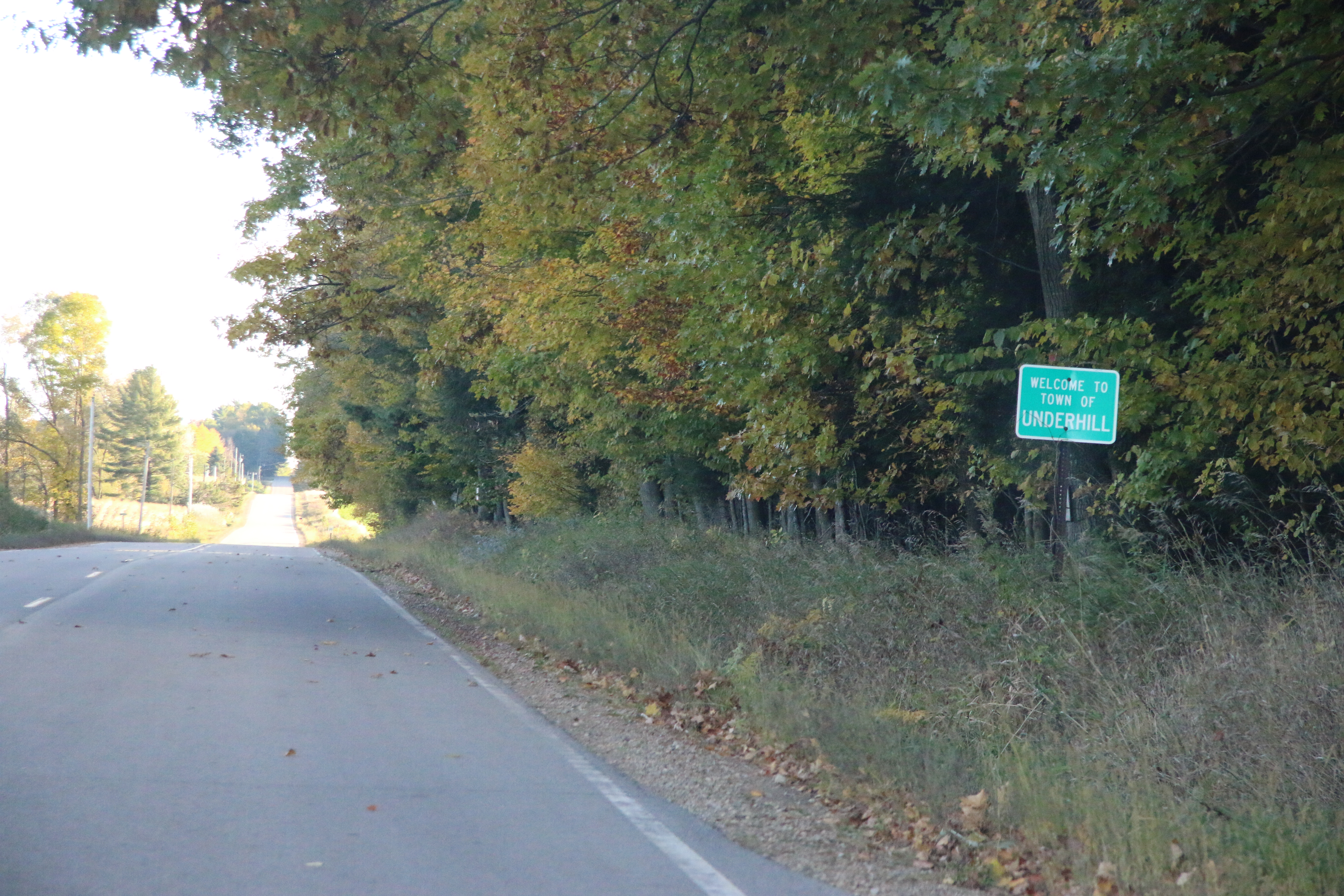
- Sign for Underhill

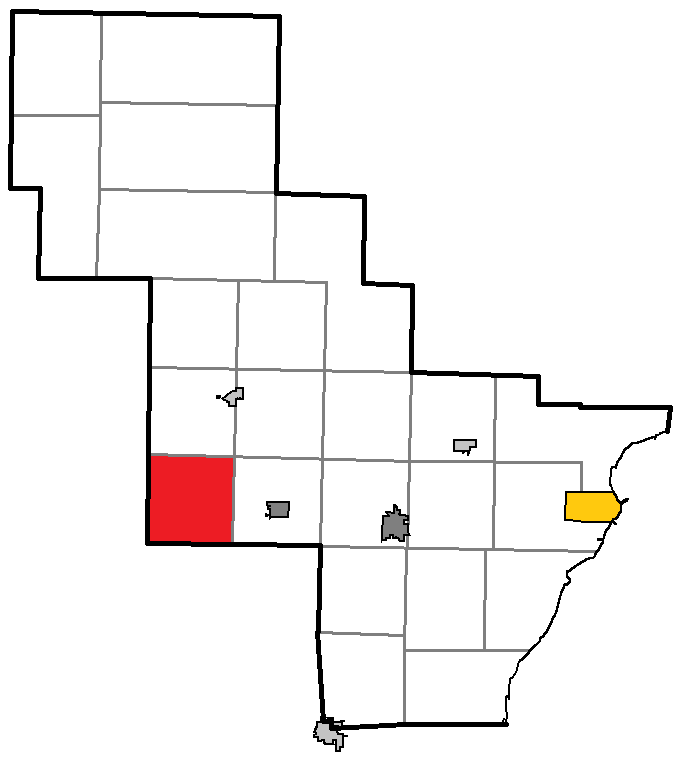
- Location of Underhill, within Oconto County
- Coordinates: 44°53′47″N 88°26′5″W
- Country: United States
- State: Wisconsin
- County: Oconto

Area
  - Total: 35.6 sq mi (92.2 km^{2})
  - Land: 35.1 sq mi (90.8 km^{2})
  - Water: 0.54 sq mi (1.4 km^{2})
- Elevation: 837 ft (255 m)

Population (2020)
  - Total: 864
  - Density: 24.6/sq mi (9.52/km^{2})
- Time zone: UTC-6 (Central (CST))
  - Summer (DST): UTC-5 (CDT)
- FIPS code: 55-81475
- GNIS feature ID: 1584308
- Website: http://townofunderhill.com/

Underhill is a town in Oconto County, Wisconsin, United States. The population was 864 at the 2020 census.

== Communities ==
- Hintz is an unincorporated community on County Road H, east of Morgan Road. The community was named after Robert Hintz, the first postmaster for the community.
- Mosling is an unincorporated community on County Road P, located both in Underhill and in the town of Gillett to the east. The community was named in honor of local merchants.
- Underhill is an unincorporated community located along the Oconto River northwest of where County Road V crosses the river.

== History ==
The Menominee call this place Kāēkāēaweqnikoniw, an archaic name meaning "crossing the portage". It falls within traditional Menominee territory which was ceded to the United States in the 1836 Treaty of the Cedars as part of the negotiations about how to accommodate the Oneida, Stockbridge-Munsee and Brothertown peoples who had been removed from New York to Wisconsin. The town was later named in English after William Underhill, a white settler from Vermont. The town did have an operating post office established in 1888 until it was discontinued in 1976.

== Geography ==
According to the United States Census Bureau, the town has a total area of 35.6 square miles (92.2 km^{2}), of which 35.1 square miles (90.8 km^{2}) is land and 0.5 square miles (1.4 km^{2}) (1.52%) is water.

== Demographics ==
At the 2000 census, there were 846 people, 329 households and 235 families residing in the town. The population density was 24.1 per square mile (9.3/km^{2}). There were 468 housing units at an average density of 13.3 per square mile (5.2/km^{2}). The racial makeup of the town was 93.50% White, 3.43% Native American, 0.35% Asian, and 2.72% from two or more races. Hispanic or Latino of any race were 0.12% of the population.

There were 329 households, of which 30.1% had children under the age of 18 living with them, 62.6% were married couples living together, 5.8% had a female householder with no husband present, and 28.3% were non-families. 22.5% of all households were made up of individuals, and 7.6% had someone living alone who was 65 years of age or older. The average household size was 2.57 and the average family size was 3.03.

Age distribution was 25.5% under the age of 18, 7.0% from 18 to 24, 28.4% from 25 to 44, 23.8% from 45 to 64, and 15.4% who were 65 years of age or older. The median age was 39 years. For every 100 females, there were 109.9 males. For every 100 females age 18 and over, there were 108.6 males.

The median household income was $31,905, and the median family income was $39,844. Males had a median income of $31,250 compared with $20,521 for females. The per capita income for the town was $16,503. About 6.2% of families and 10.8% of the population were below the poverty line, including 13.8% of those under age 18 and 4.4% of those age 65 or over.
