= Oconto River =

River in the U.S. state of Wisconsin

Coordinates: 44.8942°N 87.8300°W

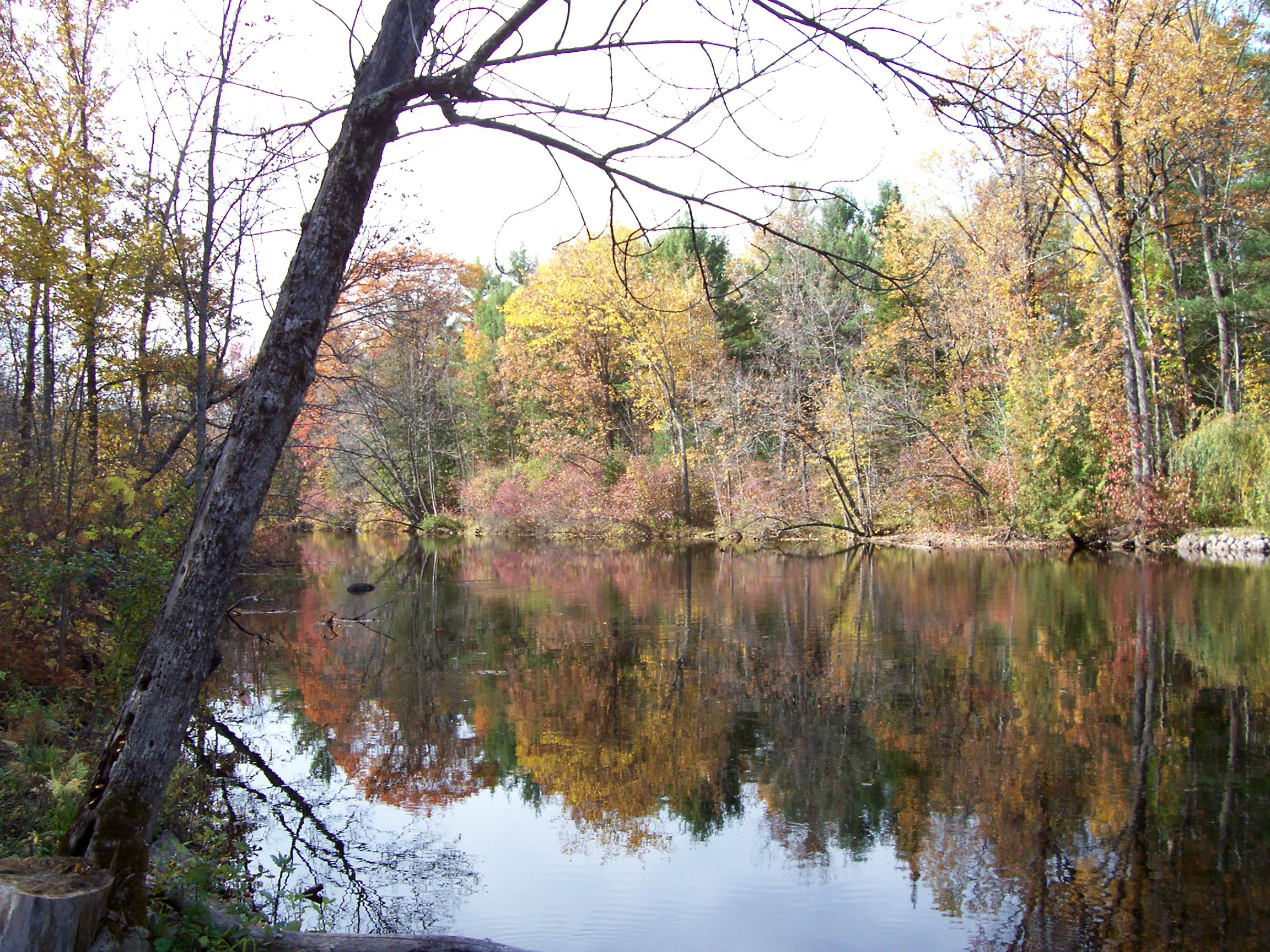
The Oconto River in autumn

Located in northeastern Wisconsin, the Oconto River is a tributary of Lake Michigan via Green Bay. The Oconto River is 56.9 miles (91.6 km) long, stretching from the confluence of its north and south branches at Suring, Wisconsin, to Green Bay at the city of Oconto. Its drainage basin covers 2,416 square miles (6,260 km^{2}), encompassing most of Oconto County as well as portions of Shawano, Marinette, Menominee, Langlade, and Forest counties.

== Images ==
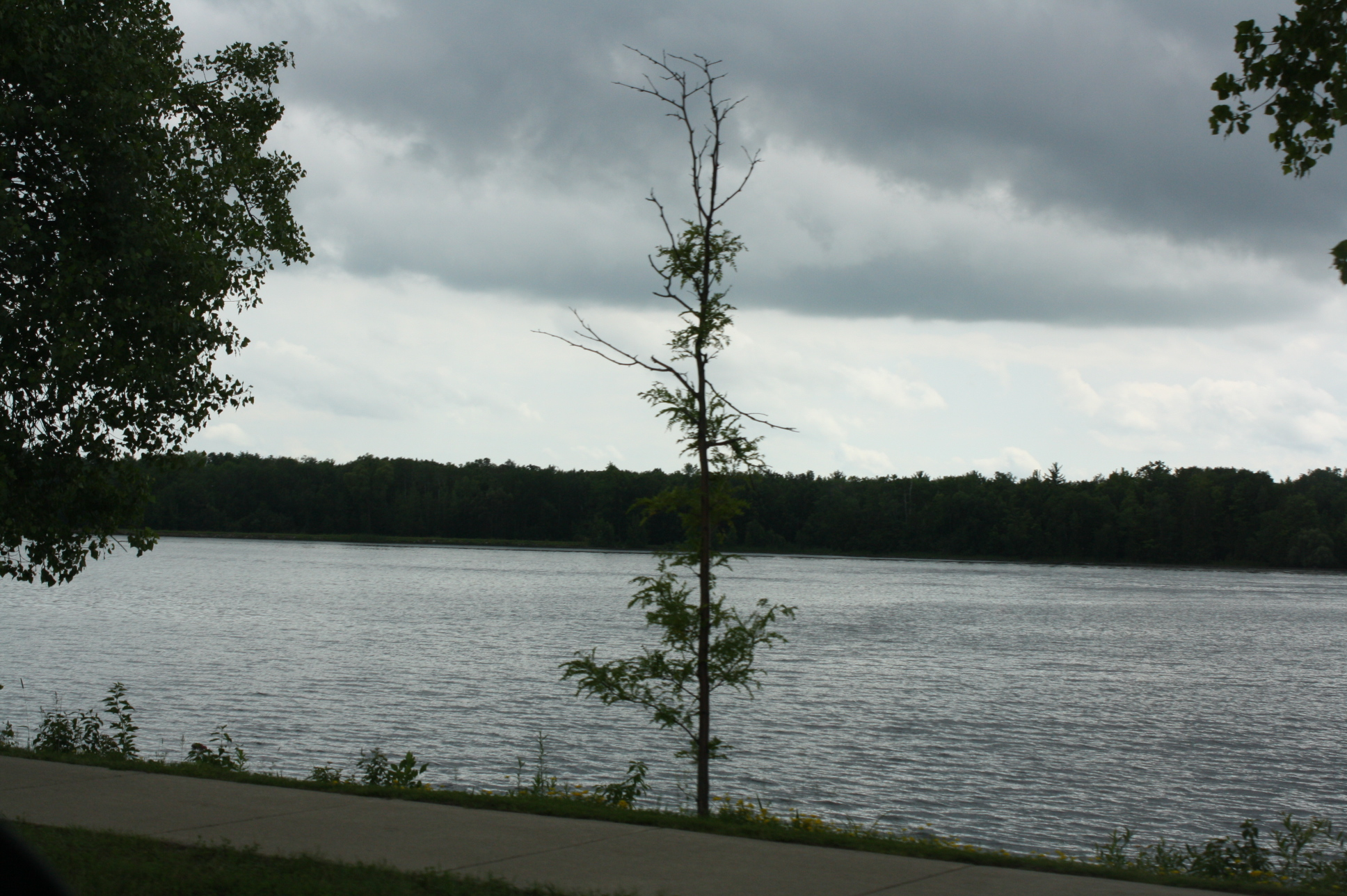
The Oconto River in Oconto Falls

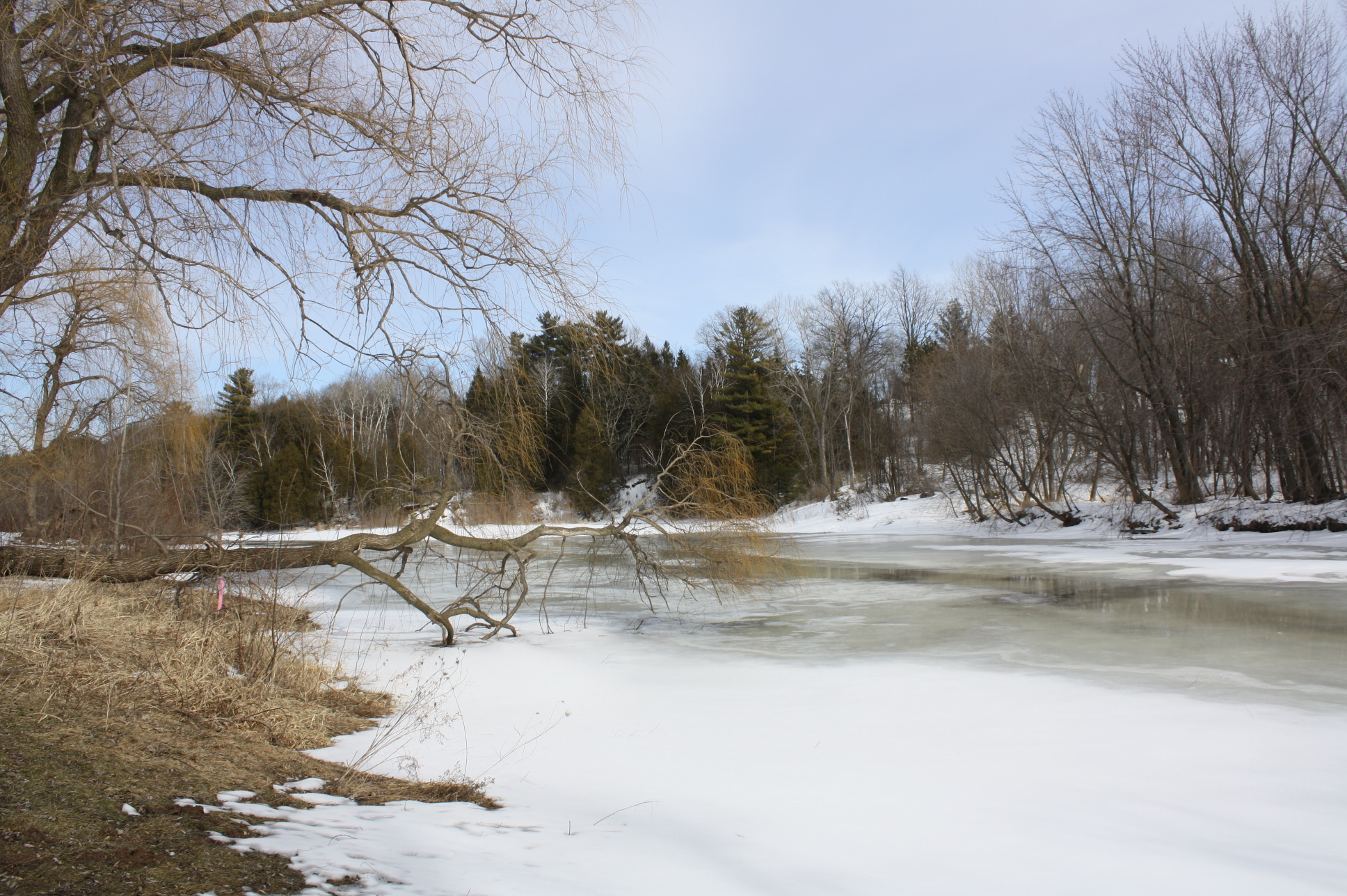
The Oconto River in Pulcifer during late winter
