= Wisconsin's 12th Senate district =

American legislative district

Wisconsin's 12th State Senate district
- 2024 map defined in 2023 Wisc. Act 94; 2022 map defined in Johnson v. Wisconsin Elections Commission; 2011 map was defined in 2011 Wisc. Act 43 composed of Assembly districts 34, 35, and 36
Senator
Mary Felzkowski; R–Irma
since January 4, 2021 (5 years, 152 days)
- Demographics: 93.15% White; 0.57% Black; 1.5% Hispanic; 0.68% Asian; 3.4% Native American; 0.09% Hawaiian/Pacific Islander
- Population (2020) • Voting age: 179,426; 147,090
- Website: Official website
- Notes: Northern Wisconsin

The 12th Senate district of Wisconsin is one of 33 districts in the Wisconsin Senate. Located in northern Wisconsin, the district comprises Florence, Forest, Langlade, Lincoln, Marinette, Oneida, and Vilas counties, and parts of northern Oconto County, northwest Shawano County, and northeast Marathon County. It contains the cities of Antigo, Eagle River, Marinette, Merrill, Peshtigo, Rhinelander, and Tomahawk.

== Current elected officials ==
Mary Felzkowski is the senator representing the 12th district. She was first elected in the 2020 general election. She previously served 8 years in the State Assembly.

Each Wisconsin State Senate district is composed of three Wisconsin State Assembly districts. The 12th Senate district comprises the 34th, 35th, and 36th Assembly districts. The current representatives of those districts are:

- Assembly District 34: Rob Swearingen (R–Rhinelander)
- Assembly District 35: Calvin Callahan (R–Tomahawk)
- Assembly District 36: Jeffrey Mursau (R–Crivitz)

The 12th Senate district is split between two congressional districts. The portion of the district in Florence, Forest, Langlade, Oneida, Vilas, Lincoln, and Marathon counties falls within the Wisconsin's 7th congressional district, which is represented by U.S. Representative Tom Tiffany; the remainder of the district, which falls within Marinette, Oconto, Menominee, and Shawano counties, is in Wisconsin's 8th congressional district, which is represented by U.S. Representative Mike Gallagher.

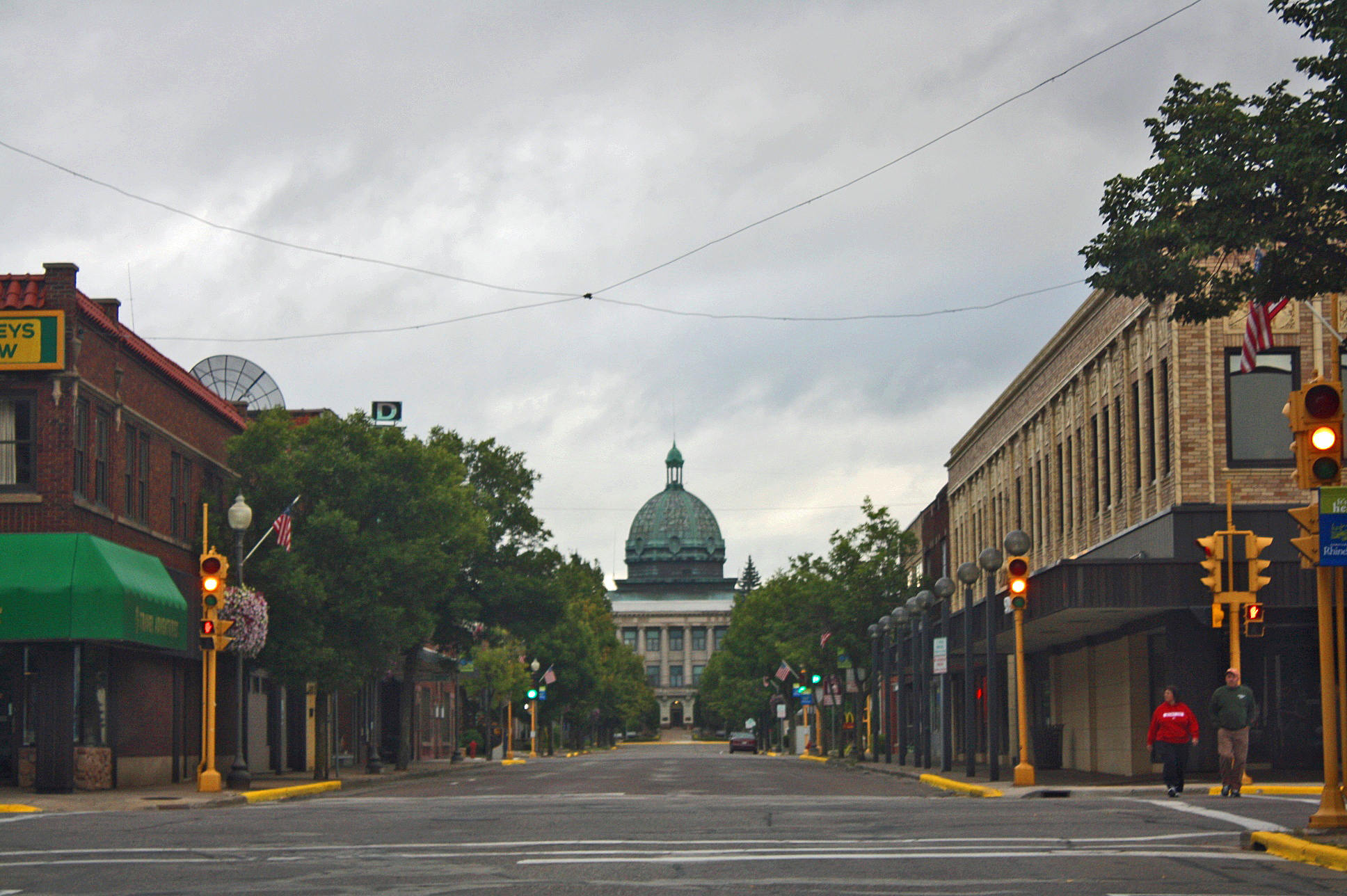
Downtown Rhinelander

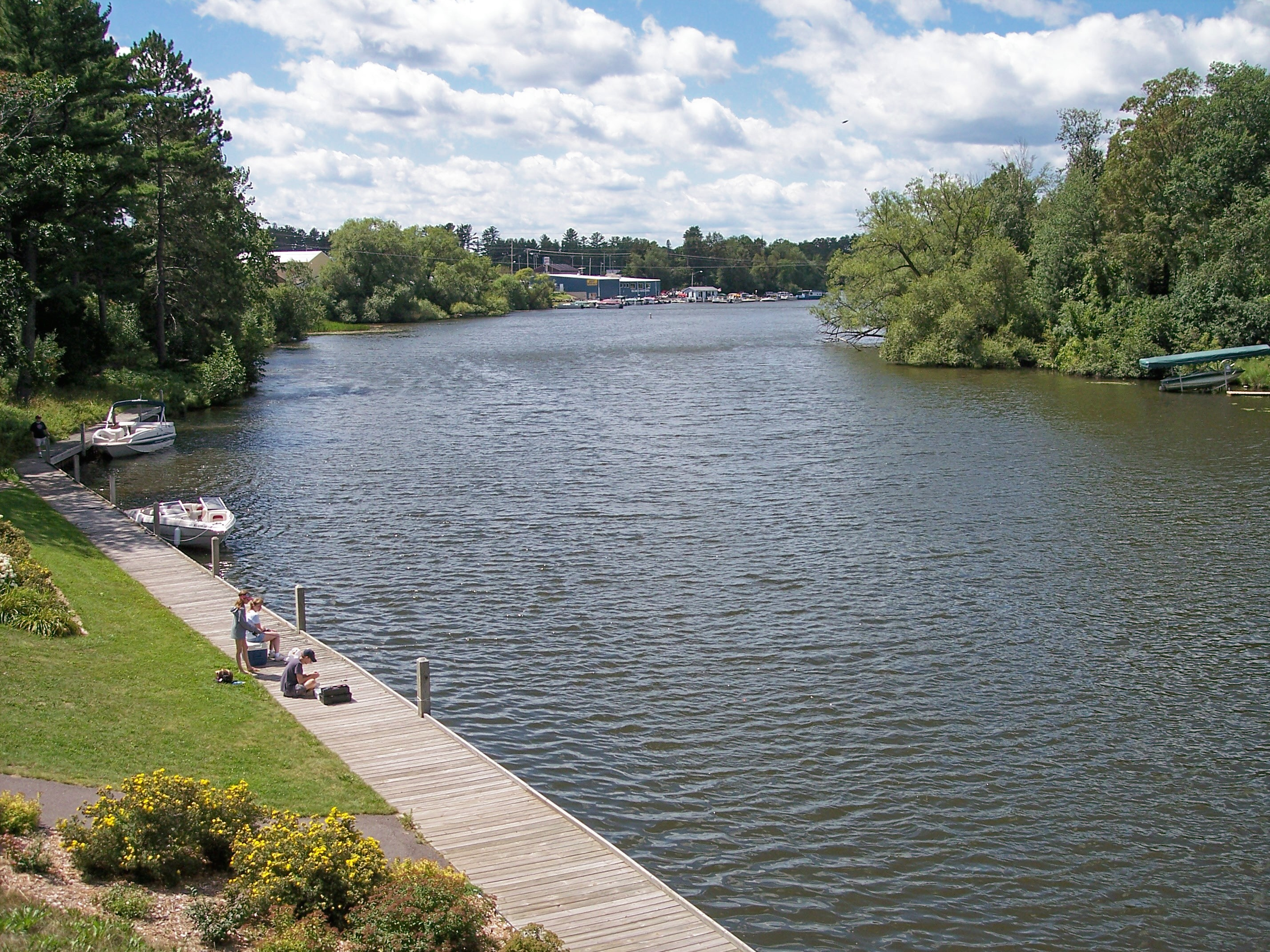
The Eagle River flowing through Eagle River

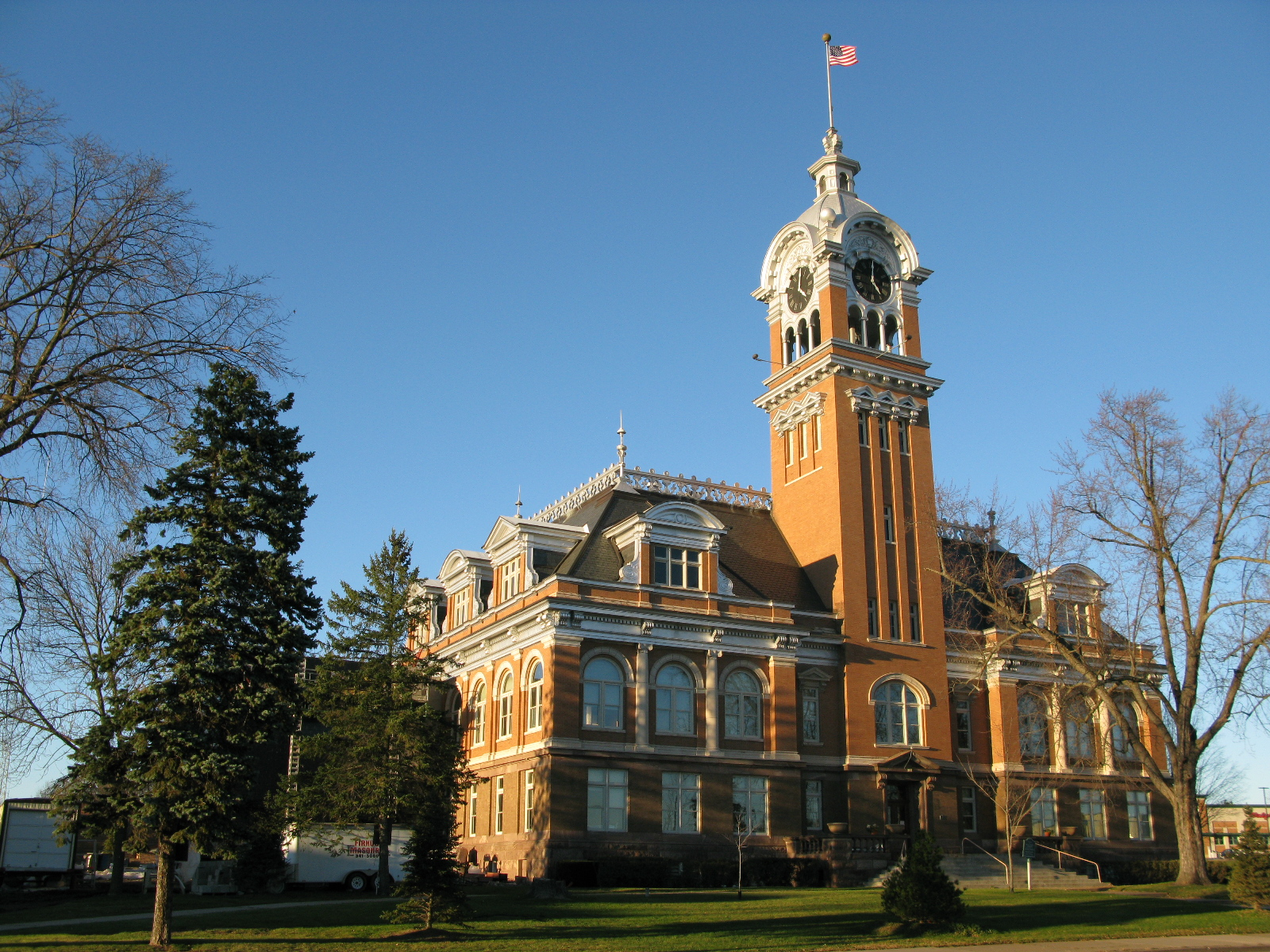
Historic Lincoln County Courthouse in Merrill

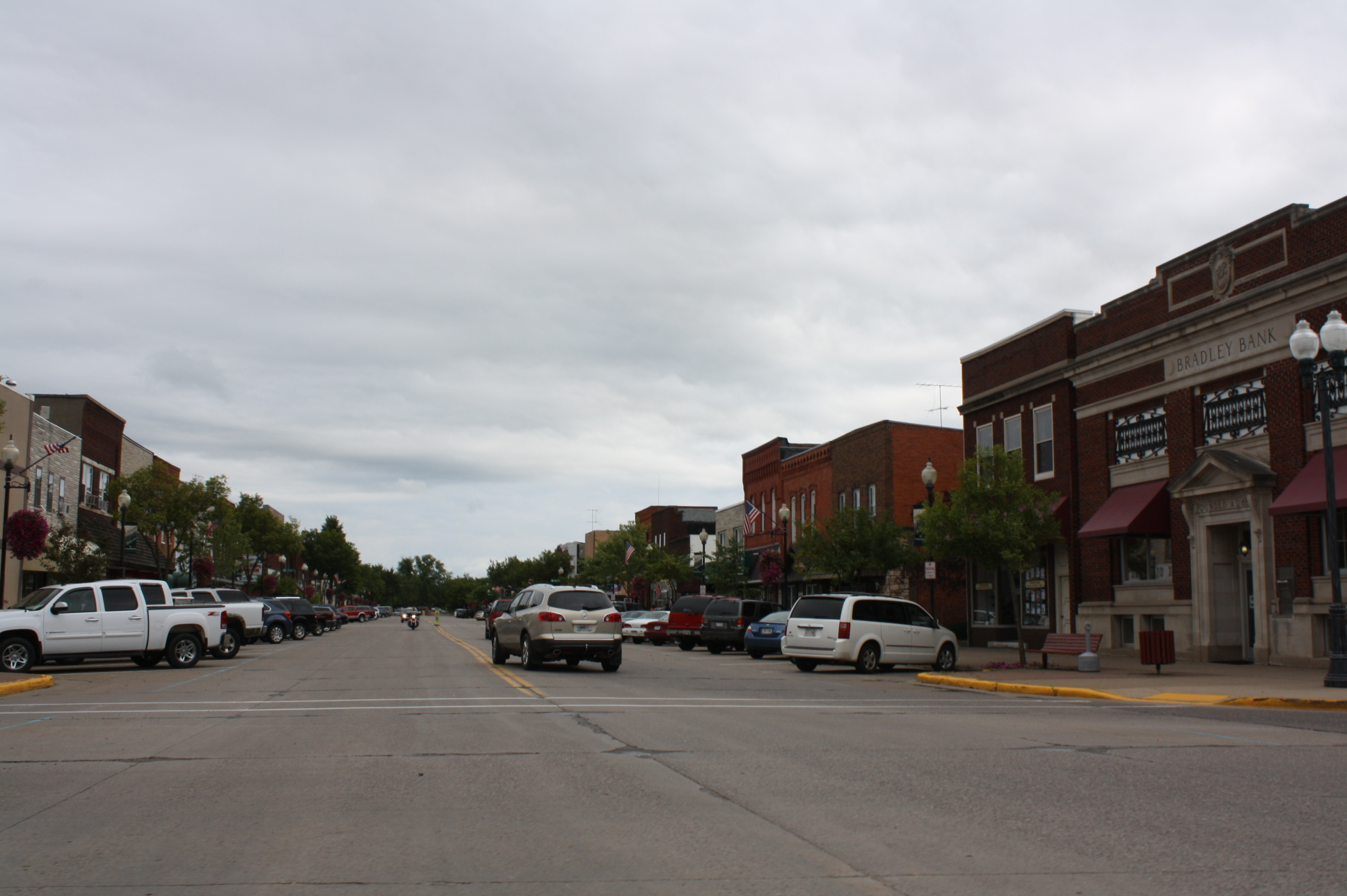
Downtown Tomahawk

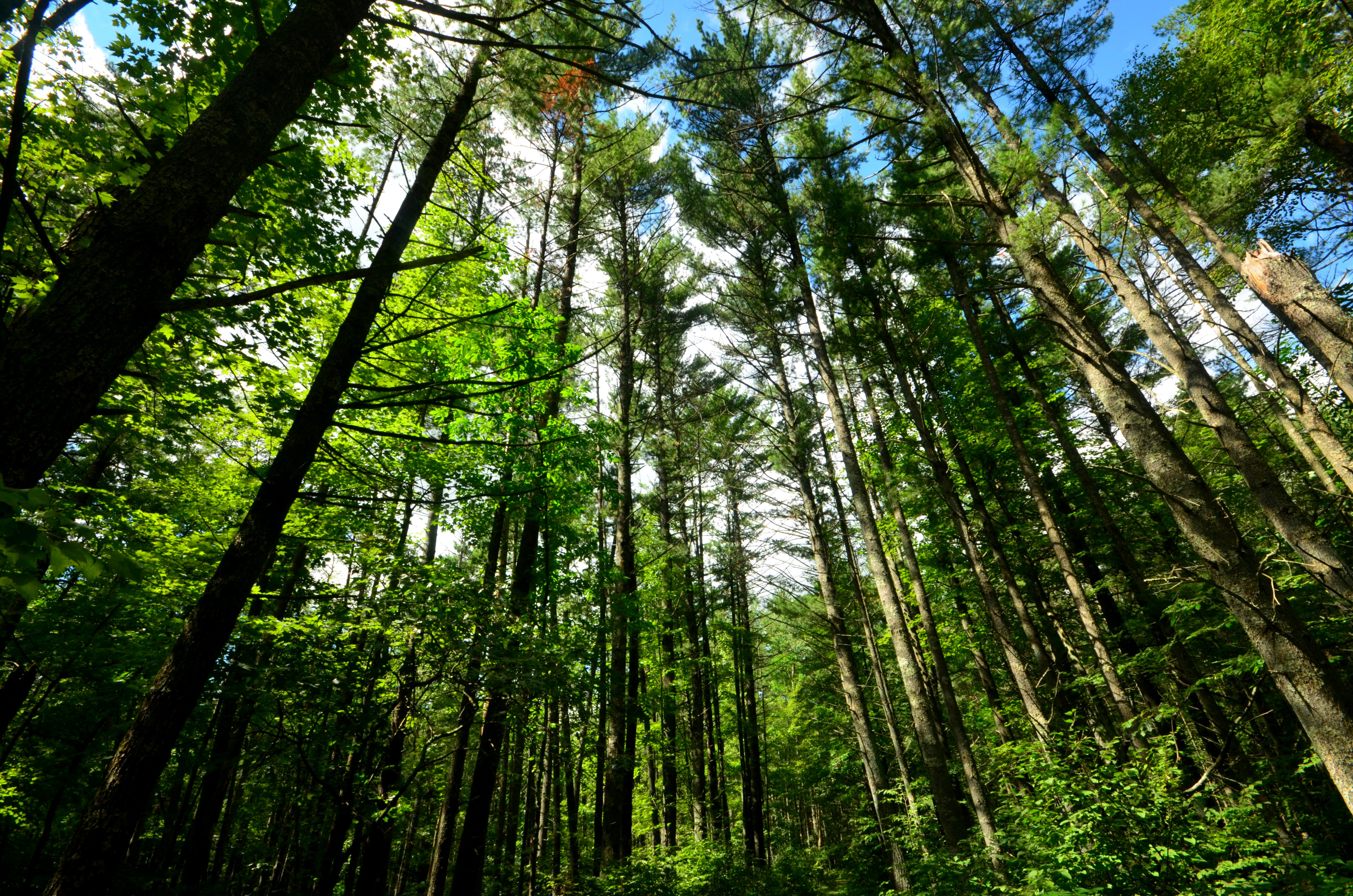
Pine forest within Council Grounds State Park

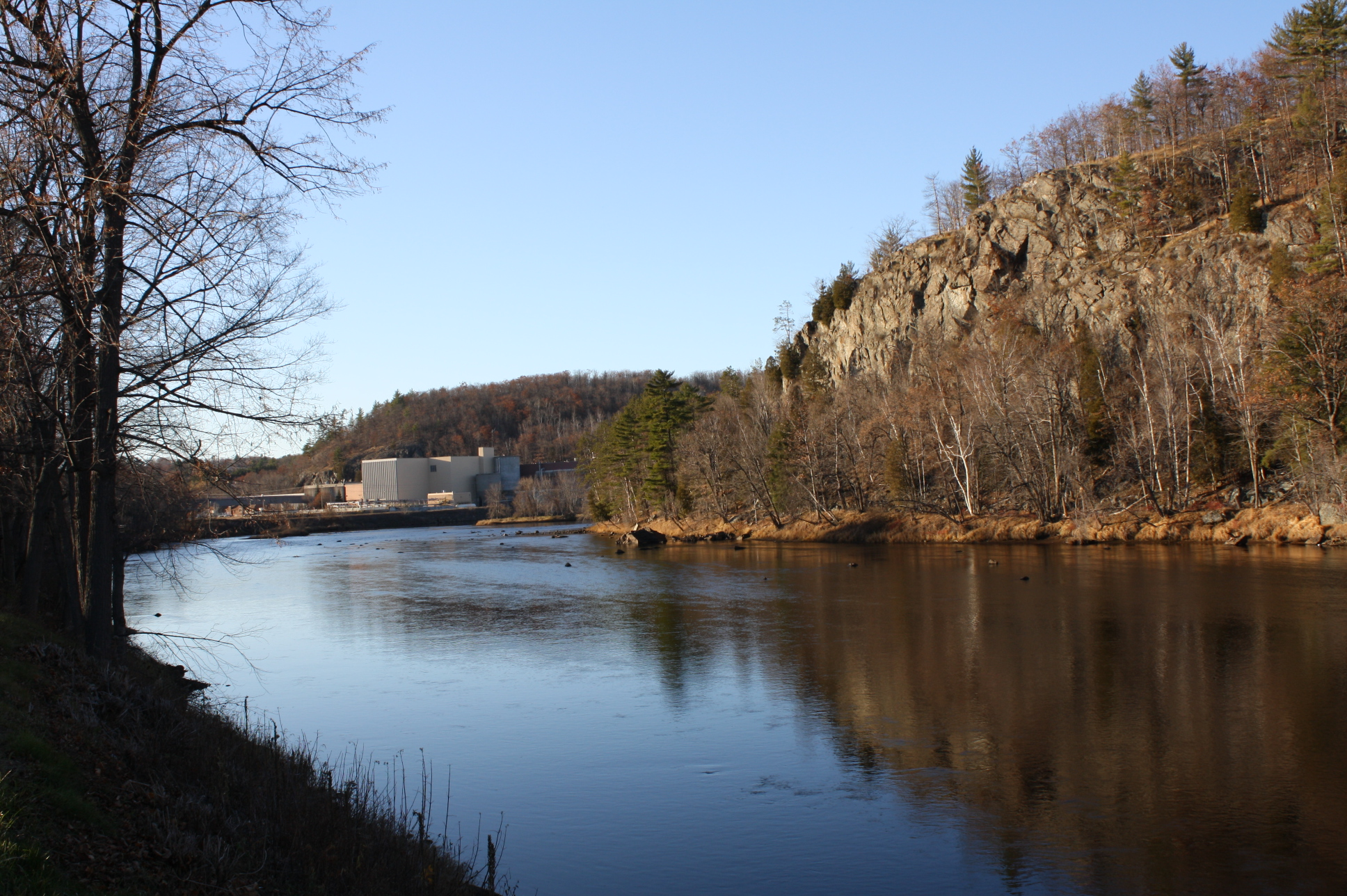
Menominee River viewed from Niagara

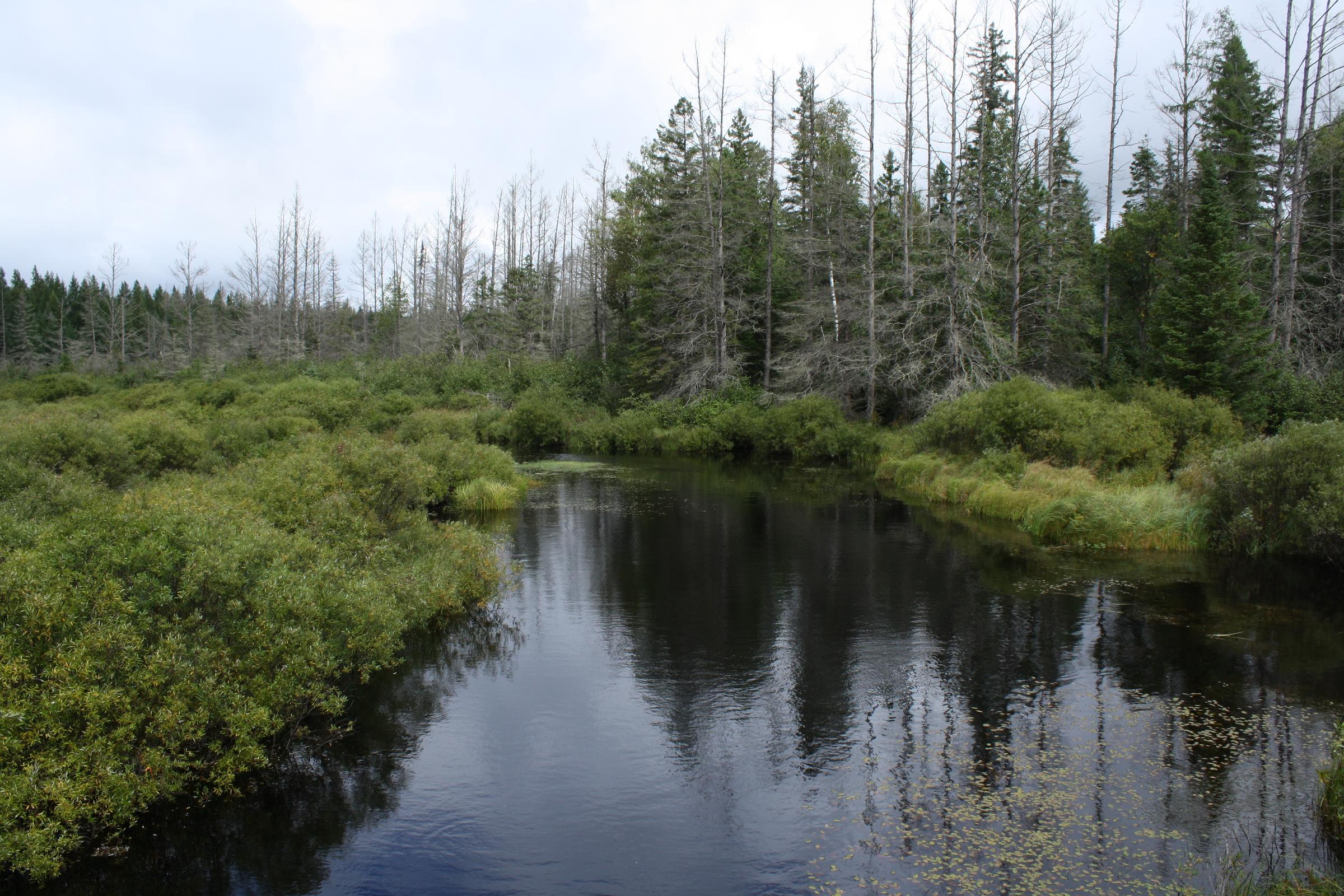
Headwaters Wilderness in the Nicolet National Forest

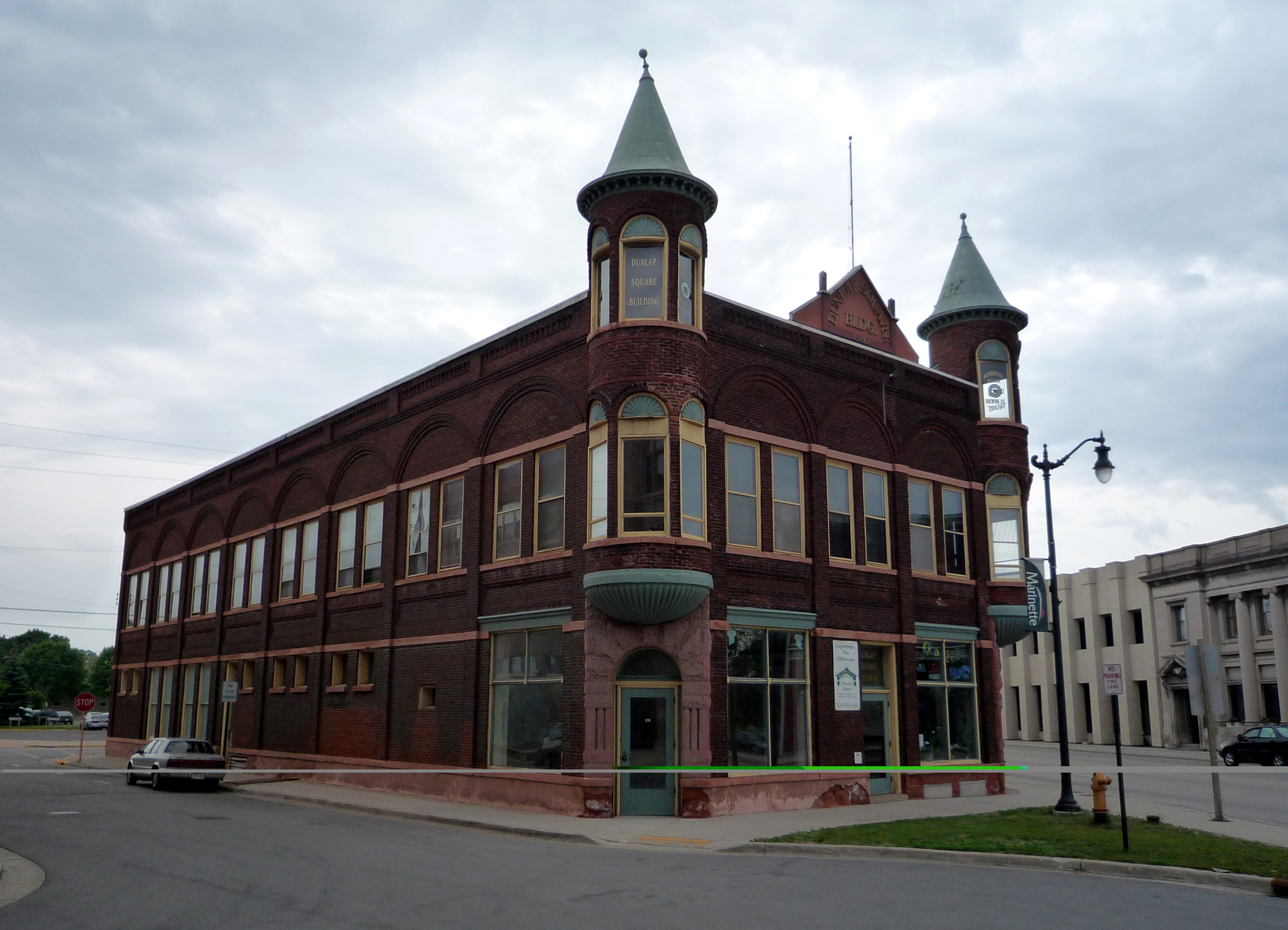
Dunlap Square Building in Marinette

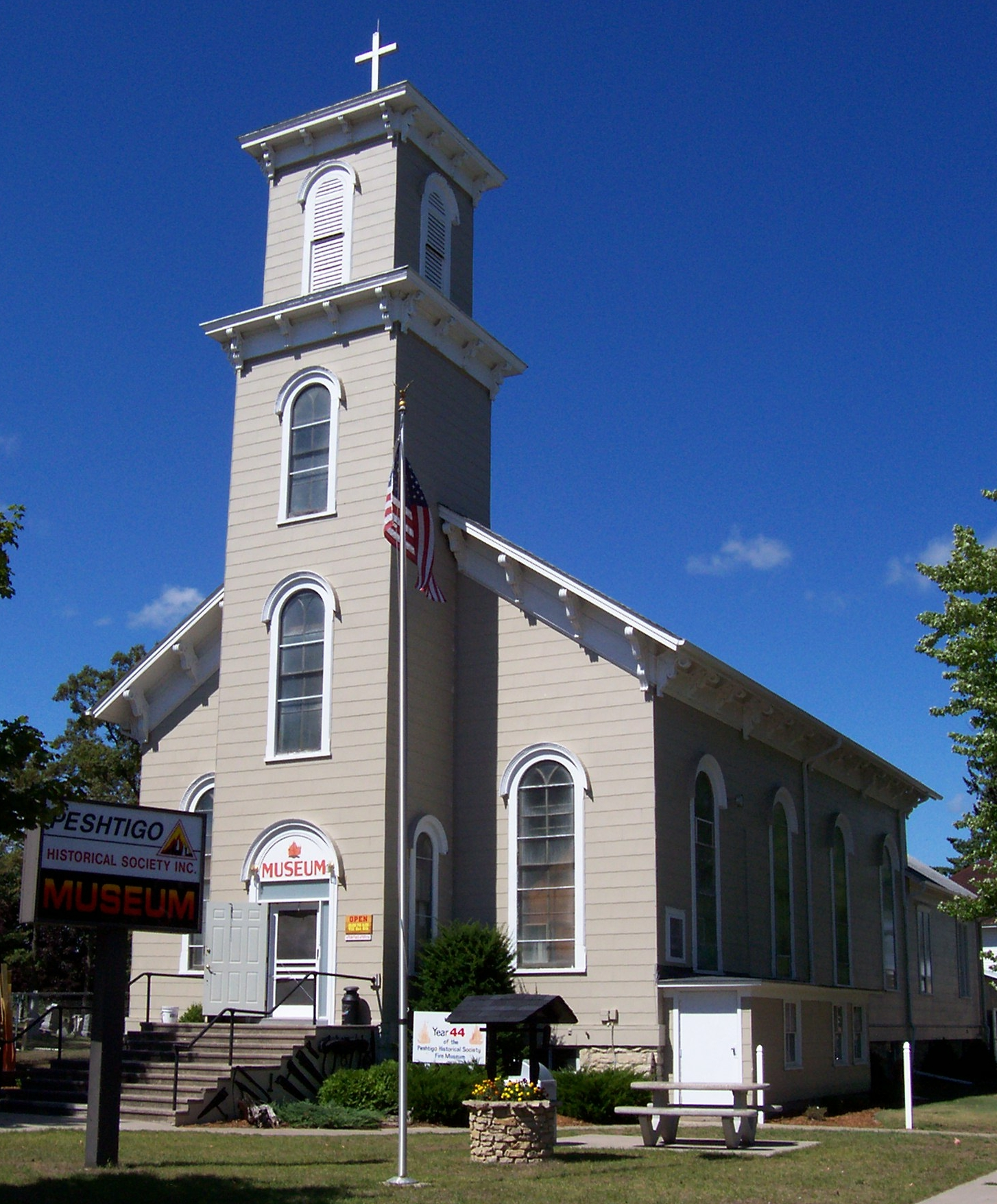
Peshtigo Fire Museum in Peshtigo

== Past senators ==
Past senators include:

Note: the boundaries of the district has changed repeatedly over history. Previous politicians of this district have represented a completely different geographic area, due to redistricting. The district definitions for the given era are specified in the "District definition" column.

Senator	Party	Notes	Session	Years	District Definition
--District created--				1848	Jefferson County
Myron B. Williams	Dem.		1st	1848	Jefferson County
Myron B. Williams	Dem.		2nd	1849	Jefferson County
Peter H. Turner	Dem.		3rd	1850	Jefferson County
Peter H. Turner	Dem.		4th	1851	Jefferson County
Alva Stewart	Whig	Transitioned to 14th district	5th	1852	Jefferson County
Eleazer Wakeley	Dem.		6th	1853	1852–1855 1856–1860 1861–1865 1866–1870; Walworth County
Eleazer Wakeley	Dem.		7th	1854	1852–1855 1856–1860 1861–1865 1866–1870; Walworth County
Eleazer Wakeley	Dem.		8th	1855	1852–1855 1856–1860 1861–1865 1866–1870; Walworth County
Jesse C. Mills	Rep.		9th	1856	1852–1855 1856–1860 1861–1865 1866–1870; Walworth County
Jesse C. Mills	Rep.		10th	1857	1852–1855 1856–1860 1861–1865 1866–1870; Walworth County
John W. Boyd	Rep.		11th	1858	1852–1855 1856–1860 1861–1865 1866–1870; Walworth County
John W. Boyd	Rep.		12th	1859	1852–1855 1856–1860 1861–1865 1866–1870; Walworth County
Oscar F. Bartlett	Rep.		13th	1860	1852–1855 1856–1860 1861–1865 1866–1870; Walworth County
Oscar F. Bartlett	Rep.		14th	1861	1852–1855 1856–1860 1861–1865 1866–1870; Walworth County
Wyman Spooner	Rep.		15th	1862	1852–1855 1856–1860 1861–1865 1866–1870; Walworth County
Wyman Spooner	Rep.		16th	1863	1852–1855 1856–1860 1861–1865 1866–1870; Walworth County
Newton Littlejohn	Natl. Union		17th	1864	1852–1855 1856–1860 1861–1865 1866–1870; Walworth County
Newton Littlejohn	Natl. Union		18th	1865	1852–1855 1856–1860 1861–1865 1866–1870; Walworth County
Newton Littlejohn	Natl. Union		19th	1866	1852–1855 1856–1860 1861–1865 1866–1870; Walworth County
Newton Littlejohn	Natl. Union		20th	1867	1852–1855 1856–1860 1861–1865 1866–1870; Walworth County
Newton Littlejohn	Rep.		21st	1868	1852–1855 1856–1860 1861–1865 1866–1870; Walworth County
Newton Littlejohn	Rep.		22nd	1869	1852–1855 1856–1860 1861–1865 1866–1870; Walworth County
Samuel Pratt	Rep.		23rd	1870	1852–1855 1856–1860 1861–1865 1866–1870; Walworth County
Samuel Pratt	Rep.		24th	1871	1852–1855 1856–1860 1861–1865 1866–1870; Walworth County
Orrin Bacon	Rep.		25th	1872	Green County
Orrin Bacon	Rep.		26th	1873	Green County
Harvey T. Moore	Ref.		27th	1874	Green County
Harvey T. Moore	Ref.		28th	1875	Green County
Joseph B. Treat	Rep.		29th	1876	Green County
Joseph B. Treat	Rep.		30th	1877	1876–1881 1882–1887 1888–1891; Green and Lafayette counties
Joseph B. Treat	Rep.		31st	1878	1876–1881 1882–1887 1888–1891; Green and Lafayette counties
Joseph B. Treat	Rep.		32nd	1879	1876–1881 1882–1887 1888–1891; Green and Lafayette counties
John W. Blackstone Jr.	Rep.		33rd	1880	1876–1881 1882–1887 1888–1891; Green and Lafayette counties
John W. Blackstone Jr.	Rep.		34th	1881	1876–1881 1882–1887 1888–1891; Green and Lafayette counties
Archibald N. Randall	Rep.		35th	1882	1876–1881 1882–1887 1888–1891; Green and Lafayette counties
Archibald N. Randall	Rep.		36th	1883–1884	1876–1881 1882–1887 1888–1891; Green and Lafayette counties
James Waddington	Rep.		37th	1885–1886	1876–1881 1882–1887 1888–1891; Green and Lafayette counties
James Waddington	Rep.		38th	1887–1888	1876–1881 1882–1887 1888–1891; Green and Lafayette counties
Phineas Clawson	Rep.		39th	1889–1890	1876–1881 1882–1887 1888–1891; Green and Lafayette counties
Phineas Clawson	Rep.		40th	1891–1892	1876–1881 1882–1887 1888–1891; Green and Lafayette counties
Neal Brown	Dem.		41st	1893–1894	Marathon and Wood counties
Neal Brown	Dem.		42nd	1895–1896	Marathon and Wood counties
Clarence A. Lamoreux	Rep.		43rd	1897–1898	Ashland, Barron, Bayfield, Iron, Sawyer, Washburn counties
Clarence A. Lamoreux	Rep.		44th	1899–1900	Ashland, Barron, Bayfield, Iron, Sawyer, Washburn counties
William O'Neil	Rep.		45th	1901–1902	Ashland, Barron, Bayfield, Iron, Sawyer, Washburn counties
William O'Neil	Rep.		46th	1903–1904	Ashland, Bayfield, Price, Sawyer, Taylor, Washburn counties
Albert W. Sanborn	Rep.		47th	1905–1906	Ashland, Bayfield, Price, Sawyer, Taylor, Washburn counties
Albert W. Sanborn	Rep.		48th	1907–1908	Ashland, Bayfield, Price, Sawyer, Taylor, Washburn counties
Albert W. Sanborn	Rep.		49th	1909–1910	Ashland, Bayfield, Price, Sawyer, Taylor, Washburn counties
Albert W. Sanborn	Rep.		50th	1911–1912	Ashland, Bayfield, Price, Sawyer, Taylor, Washburn counties
A. Pearce Tomkins	Rep.		51st	1913–1914	Ashland, Bayfield, Sawyer, Rusk, Price counties 1910 population: 69,134
A. Pearce Tomkins	Rep.		52nd	1915–1916	Ashland, Bayfield, Sawyer, Rusk, Price counties 1910 population: 69,134
A. H. Wilkinson	Rep.		53rd	1917–1918	Ashland, Bayfield, Sawyer, Rusk, Price counties 1910 population: 69,134
A. H. Wilkinson	Rep.		54th	1919–1920	Ashland, Bayfield, Sawyer, Rusk, Price counties 1910 population: 69,134
Chester H. Werden	Rep.		55th	1921–1922	Ashland, Bayfield, Sawyer, Rusk, Price counties 1910 population: 69,134
Chester H. Werden	Rep.		56th	1923–1924	Ashland, Iron, Price, Rusk, Sawyer, Vilas counties
James H. Carroll	Rep.		57th	1925–1926	Ashland, Iron, Price, Rusk, Sawyer, Vilas counties
James H. Carroll	Rep.		58th	1927–1928	Ashland, Iron, Price, Rusk, Sawyer, Vilas counties
James H. Carroll	Rep.		59th	1929–1930	Ashland, Iron, Price, Rusk, Sawyer, Vilas counties
James H. Carroll	Rep.		60th	1931–1932	Ashland, Iron, Price, Rusk, Sawyer, Vilas counties
Bernard J. Gehrmann	Rep.	Elected to U.S. House in 1934	61st	1933–1934	Ashland, Iron, Price, Rusk, Sawyer, Vilas counties
Joseph E. McDermid	Prog.	Won 1935 special election.	62nd	1935–1936	Ashland, Iron, Price, Rusk, Sawyer, Vilas counties
Joseph E. McDermid	Prog.	Won 1935 special election.	63rd	1937–1938	Ashland, Iron, Price, Rusk, Sawyer, Vilas counties
Joseph E. McDermid	Prog.	Won 1935 special election.	64th	1939–1940	Ashland, Iron, Price, Rusk, Sawyer, Vilas counties
James H. Carroll	Rep.		65th	1941–1942	Ashland, Iron, Price, Rusk, Sawyer, Vilas counties
James H. Carroll	Rep.		66th	1943–1944	Ashland, Iron, Price, Rusk, Sawyer, Vilas counties
Ernest A. Heden	Rep.		67th	1945–1946	Ashland, Iron, Price, Rusk, Sawyer, Vilas counties
Ernest A. Heden	Rep.		68th	1947–1948	Ashland, Iron, Price, Rusk, Sawyer, Vilas counties
Clayton Hicks	Rep.		69th	1949–1950	Ashland, Iron, Price, Rusk, Sawyer, Vilas counties
Clayton Hicks	Rep.		70th	1951–1952	Ashland, Iron, Price, Rusk, Sawyer, Vilas counties
Paul J. Rogan	Rep.	Resigned	71st	1953–1954	Ashland, Iron, Price, Rusk, Sawyer, Vilas counties
Bernard J. Gehrmann	Rep.	Won 1954 special election	72nd	1955–1956	Iron, Lincoln, Oneida, Price, Taylor, Vilas counties
Clifford Krueger	Rep.	Resigned 1982.	73rd	1957–1958	Iron, Lincoln, Oneida, Price, Taylor, Vilas counties
Clifford Krueger	Rep.	Resigned 1982.	74th	1959–1960	Iron, Lincoln, Oneida, Price, Taylor, Vilas counties
Clifford Krueger	Rep.	Resigned 1982.	75th	1961–1962	Iron, Lincoln, Oneida, Price, Taylor, Vilas counties
Clifford Krueger	Rep.	Resigned 1982.	76th	1963–1964	Iron, Lincoln, Oneida, Price, Taylor, Vilas counties
Clifford Krueger	Rep.	Resigned 1982.	77th	1965–1966	Clark, Forest, Lincoln, Oneida, Taylor, Vilas counties
Clifford Krueger	Rep.	Resigned 1982.	78th	1967–1968	Clark, Forest, Lincoln, Oneida, Taylor, Vilas counties
Clifford Krueger	Rep.	Resigned 1982.	79th	1969–1970	Clark, Forest, Lincoln, Oneida, Taylor, Vilas counties
Clifford Krueger	Rep.	Resigned 1982.	80th	1971–1972	Clark, Forest, Lincoln, Oneida, Taylor, Vilas counties
Clifford Krueger	Rep.	Resigned 1982.	81st	1973–1974	Florence, Forest, Lincoln, Oneida, Rusk, Taylor, Vilas & northeast Clark County, most of Langlade County, northern Marinette County, northern Oconto County, & southern Price County: Clark County; Town of Colby; Town of Green Grove; Town of Hixon; Town of Hoard; Town of Longwood; Town of Mayville; Village of Curtiss; Village of Dorchester; Village of Withee; City of Abbotsford; City of Colby; City of Owen; Langlade County; Town of Ackley; Town of Ainsworth; Town of Elcho; Town of Evergreen; Town of Langlade; Town of Neva; Town of Parrish; Town of Peck; Town of Polar; Town of Price; Town of Summit; Town of Upham; Town of Vilas; Town of Wolf River; Village of White Lake; Marinette County; Town of Amberg; Town of Athelstane; Town of Beecher; Town of Dunbar; Town of Goodman; Town of Middle Inlet; Town of Niagara; Town of Pembine; Town of Silver Cliff; Town of Wausaukee; Village of Wausaukee; City of Niagara; Oconto County; Town of Armstrong; Town of Bagley; Town of Brazeau; Town of Breed; Town of Doty; Town of Lakewood; Town of Maple Valley; Town of Riverview; Town of Spruce; Town of Townsend; Price County; Town of Catawba; Town of Georgetown; Town of Harmony; Town of Hill; Town of Kennan; Town of Knox; Town of Ogema; Town of Prentice; Town of Spirit; Village of Catawba; Village of Kennan; Village of Prentice
Clifford Krueger	Rep.	Resigned 1982.	82nd	1975–1976	
Clifford Krueger	Rep.	Resigned 1982.	83rd	1977–1978	
Clifford Krueger	Rep.	Resigned 1982.	84th	1979–1980	
Clifford Krueger	Rep.	Resigned 1982.	85th	1981–1982	
--Vacant--			86th	1983–1984	Florence, Forest, Langlade, Lincoln, Menominee, Oneida, Vilas & part of Marathon County, northern Marinette County, part of Oconto County, & northwestern Shawano County: Marathon County; Town of Berlin; Town of Hamburg; Town of Harrison; Town of Hewitt; Town of Maine; Town of Plover; Town of Texas; Village of Brokaw; Marinette County; Town of Amberg; Town of Athelstane; Town of Beecher; Town of Dunbar; Town of Goodman; Town of Niagara; Town of Pembine; Town of Silver Cliff; Town of Wausaukee; Village of Wausaukee; City of Niagara; Oconto County; Town of Armstrong; Town of Breed; Town of Doty; Town of How; Town of Lakewood; Town of Riverview; Town of Townsend; Shawano County; Town of Almon; Town of Aniwa; Town of Bartelme; Town of Birnamwood; Town of Fairbanks; Town of Germania; Town of Grant; Town of Herman; Town of Hutchins; Town of Morris; Town of Red Springs; Town of Seneca; Town of Wittenberg; Village of Aniwa; Village of Birnamwood; Village of Bowler; Village of Eland; Village of Gresham; Village of Mattoon; Village of Tigerton; Village of Wittenberg
Lloyd H. Kincaid	Dem.	Won 1983 special election.	86th	1983–1984	
Lloyd H. Kincaid	Dem.	Won 1983 special election.	87th	1985–1986	Florence, Forest, Langlade, Lincoln, Menominee, Oneida, Vilas & part of Marathon County, northern Marinette County, northern Oconto County, & part of Shawano County: Marathon County; Town of Berlin; Town of Easton; Town of Elderon; Town of Harrison; Town of Hewitt; Town of Plover; Town of Norrie; Town of Texas; Village of Elderon; Marinette County; Town of Amberg; Town of Athelstane; Town of Beecher; Town of Dunbar; Town of Goodman; Town of Middle Inlet; Town of Niagara; Town of Pembine; Town of Silver Cliff; Town of Wagner; Town of Wausaukee; Village of Wausaukee; City of Niagara; Oconto County; Town of Armstrong; Town of Brazeau; Town of Breed; Town of Doty; Town of Lakewood; Town of Riverview; Town of Townsend; Shawano County; Town of Almon; Town of Aniwa; Town of Bartelme; Town of Birnamwood; Town of Fairbanks; Town of Grant; Town of Hutchins; Town of Morris; Town of Red Springs; Town of Seneca; Town of Wittenberg; Village of Aniwa; Village of Birnamwood; Village of Bowler; Village of Eland; Village of Gresham; Village of Mattoon; Village of Tigerton; Village of Wittenberg
Lloyd H. Kincaid	Dem.	Won 1983 special election.	88th	1987–1988	
Lloyd H. Kincaid	Dem.	Won 1983 special election.	89th	1989–1990	
--Vacant--			89th	1989–1990	
Roger Breske	Dem.	Won 1990 special election.	90th	1991–1992	
Roger Breske	Dem.	Won 1990 special election.	91st	1993–1994	Florence, Forest, Langlade, Lincoln, Menominee, Oneida, Vilas & part of Marathon County, northern Marinette County, northern Oconto County, part of Portage County, part of Shawano County, & part of Waupaca County: Marathon County; Town of Berlin; Town of Elderon; Town of Franzen; Town of Harrison; Town of Hewitt; Town of Plover; Town of Norrie; Town of Texas; Village of Elderon; Village of Hatley; Marinette County; Town of Amberg; Town of Athelstane; Town of Beecher; Town of Dunbar; Town of Goodman; Town of Middle Inlet; Town of Niagara; Town of Pembine; Town of Silver Cliff; Town of Stephenson; Town of Wagner; Town of Wausaukee; Village of Crivitz; Village of Wausaukee; City of Niagara; Oconto County; Town of Armstrong; Town of Bagley; Town of Breed; Town of Doty; Town of Lakewood; Town of Riverview; Town of Townsend; Portage County; Town of Alban; Village of Rosholt; Shawano County; Town of Almon; Town of Aniwa; Town of Bartelme; Town of Birnamwood; Town of Germania; Town of Fairbanks; Town of Hutchins; Town of Morris; Town of Red Springs; Town of Seneca; Town of Wittenberg; Village of Aniwa; Village of Birnamwood; Village of Bowler; Village of Eland; Village of Gresham; Village of Mattoon; Village of Tigerton; Village of Wittenberg; Waupaca County; Town of Harrison; Town of Wyoming; Village of Big Falls
Roger Breske	Dem.	Won 1990 special election.	92nd	1995–1996	
Roger Breske	Dem.	Won 1990 special election.	93rd	1997–1998	
Roger Breske	Dem.	Won 1990 special election.	94th	1999–2000	
Roger Breske	Dem.	Won 1990 special election.	95th	2001–2002	
Roger Breske	Dem.	Won 1990 special election.	96th	2003–2004	Florence, Forest, Langlade, Lincoln, Menominee, Oneida, Vilas & part of Marathon County, northern Marinette County, northern Oconto County, & part of Shawano County: Marathon County; Town of Elderon; Town of Hamburg; Town of Halsey; Town of Harrison; Town of Hewitt; Village of Athens; Village of Elderon; Marinette County; Town of Amberg; Town of Athelstane; Town of Beecher; Town of Dunbar; Town of Goodman; Town of Lake; Town of Middle Inlet; Town of Niagara; Town of Pembine; Town of Porterfield; Town of Silver Cliff; Town of Stephenson; Town of Wagner; Town of Wausaukee; village of Crivitz; Village of Wausaukee; City of Niagara; Oconto County; Town of Doty; Town of Lakewood; Town of Mountain; Town of Riverview; Town of Townsend; Shawano County; Town of Almon; Town of Aniwa; Town of Bartelme; Town of Birnamwood; Town of Hutchins; Town of Red Springs; Town of Wittenberg; Village of Birnamwood; Village of Mattoon; Village of Wittenberg
Roger Breske	Dem.	Won 1990 special election.	97th	2005–2006	
Roger Breske	Dem.	Won 1990 special election.	98th	2007–2008	
Jim Holperin	Dem.		99th	2009–2010	
Jim Holperin	Dem.		100th	2011–2012	
Tom Tiffany	Rep.	Elected to U.S. House in 2020.	101st	2013–2014	Florence, Forest, Langlade, Lincoln, Menominee, Oneida & part Marathon County, northern Marinette County, northern Oconto County, part of Shawano County, & most of Vilas County: Marathon County; Town of Berlin; Town of Hamburg; Town of Harrison; Town of Hewitt; Town of Plover; Marinette County; Town of Amberg; Town of Athelstane; Town of Beaver; Town of Beecher; Town of Dunbar; Town of Goodman; Town of Lake; Town of Middle Inlet; Town of Niagara; Town of Pembine; Town of Porterfield; Town of Silver Cliff; Town of Stephenson; Town of Wagner; Town of Wausaukee; Village of Crivitz; Village of Wausaukee; City of Niagara; Oconto County; Town of Bagley; Town of Brazeau; Town of Breed; Town of Chase; Town of Doty; Town of Gillett; Town of How; Town of Lakewood; Town of Lena; Town of Maple Valley; Town of Morgan; Town of Mountain; Town of Oconto Falls; Town of Riverview; Town of Spruce; Town of Townsend; Town of Underhill; Village of Lena; Village of Suring; City of Gillett; City of Oconto Falls; Shawano County; Town of Almon; Town of Aniwa; Town of Birnamwood; Town of Green Valley; Town of Hutchins; Town of Washington; Village of Aniwa; Village of Birnamwood; Village of Bowler; Village of Cecil; Village of Eland; Village of Mattoon; Vilas County; Town of Arbor Vitae; Town of Boulder Junction; Town of Cloverland; Town of Conover; Town of Land O' Lakes; Town of Lincoln; Town of Manitowish Waters; Town of Phelps; Town of Plum Lake; Town of Presque Isle; Town of St. Germain; Town of Washington; Town of Winchester; City of Eagle River
Tom Tiffany	Rep.	Elected to U.S. House in 2020.	102nd	2015–2016	
Tom Tiffany	Rep.	Elected to U.S. House in 2020.	103rd	2017–2018	
Tom Tiffany	Rep.	Elected to U.S. House in 2020.	104th	2019–2020	
--Vacant--			104th	2019–2020	
Mary Felzkowski	Rep.		105th	2021–2022	
Mary Felzkowski	Rep.		106th	2023–2024	Florence, Forest, Langlade, Lincoln, Menominee, Oneida & part Marathon County, northern Marinette County, northern Oconto County, part of Shawano County, & most of Vilas County
Mary Felzkowski	Rep.		107th	2025–2026	
