= Senator Waddington =

Senator Waddington may refer to:

- James Waddington (1831–1917), Wisconsin State Senate
- John A. Waddington (1911–1981), New Jersey State Senate
