= Paac Ciinak, Wisconsin =

Census-designated place in Wisconsin, United States

Paak Ciinac, Wisconsin
- Census-designated place
- Location within Wisconsin Location within the United States
- Coordinates: 44°51′21″N 89°9′30″W
- Country: United States
- State: Wisconsin
- County: Shawano
- Towns: Birnamwood; Wittenberg

Area
  - Total: 1.00 sq mi (2.59 km^{2})
  - Land: 1.00 sq mi (2.59 km^{2})
  - Water: 0 sq mi (0.0 km^{2})
- Elevation: 1,202 ft (366 m)

Population (2020)
  - Total: 83
- Time zone: UTC-6 (Central (CST))
  - Summer (DST): UTC-5 (CDT)
- ZIP Code: 54499 (Wittenberg)
- Area codes: 715/534
- FIPS code: 55-60912
- GNIS feature ID: 2807530

Paac Ciinak is a census-designated place (CDP) in Shawano County, Wisconsin, United States. As of the 2020 census, it had a population of 83. On older federal topographic maps, the community is shown as Potch-Chee-Nunk or Potch Che Nunk.

The community is in western Shawano County, on land of the Ho-Chunk Nation of Wisconsin. It is bordered to the west by U.S. Route 45, which leads southward 2 miles (3 km) to Wittenberg and northwestward 3 miles (5 km) to Eland. The Middle Branch of the Embarrass River flows southward through the western side of the community.
