= Doty, Wisconsin =

- Town
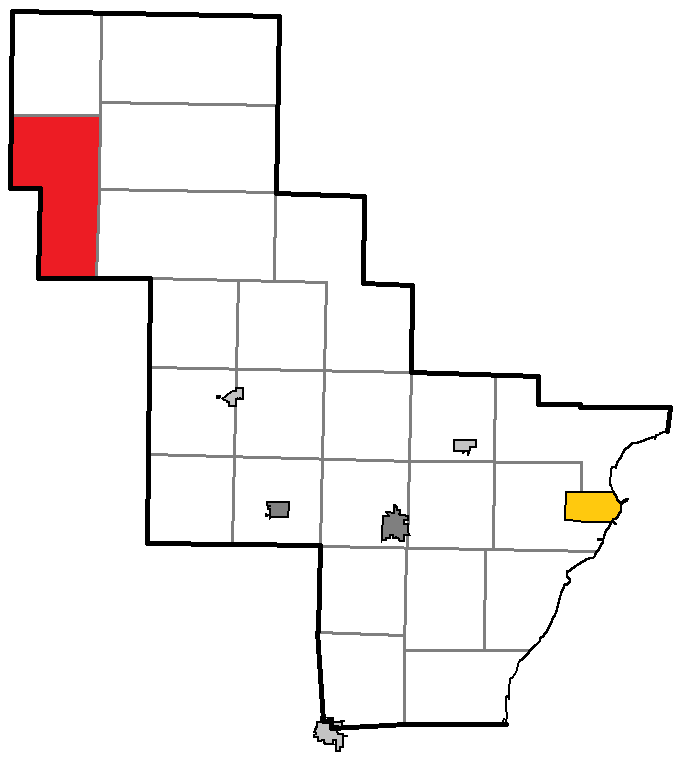
- Location of Doty, within Oconto County
- Coordinates: 45°12′17″N 88°36′53″W
- Country: United States
- State: Wisconsin
- County: Oconto

Area
  - Total: 54.4 sq mi (140.9 km^{2})
  - Land: 52.2 sq mi (135.1 km^{2})
  - Water: 2.2 sq mi (5.8 km^{2})
- Elevation: 1,194 ft (364 m)

Population (2020)
  - Total: 309
  - Density: 5.92/sq mi (2.29/km^{2})
- Time zone: UTC-6 (Central (CST))
  - Summer (DST): UTC-5 (CDT)
- FIPS code: 55-20475
- GNIS feature ID: 1583090
- Website: https://townofdoty.org/

Doty is a town in Oconto County, Wisconsin, United States. The population was 309 at the 2020 census.

The town was named for James Duane Doty, the first person to represent Wisconsin's third congressional district after statehood and Governor of the Utah Territory during the Civil War. Other sources say the town was named for S.W. Doty, a prominent figure in local town and county government. S.W. Doty was the first chairman of the town.

The town was platted and established in 1922. Doty was part of the town of How until 1922. The Valley View School (Kingston School) was one of three schools in the town, the other two being the Statler school and another unknown school, likely named "Holt Spur," from the 1912 plat map. The Valley View School later consolidated with Mountain School in September of 1953. The building remained as the Doty Town Hall until 2009 when it was demolished and replaced with the newer and more modern town hall and fire department.

== Geography ==
According to the United States Census Bureau, the town has a total area of 54.4 square miles (140.9 km^{2}), of which 52.2 square miles (135.1 km^{2}) is land and 2.2 square miles (5.8 km^{2}) (4.10%) is water.

== Demographics ==
As of the census of 2000, there were 249 people, 120 households, and 87 families residing in the town. The population density was 4.8 people per square mile (1.8/km^{2}). There were 438 housing units at an average density of 8.4 per square mile (3.2/km^{2}). The racial makeup of the town was 98.80% White, 0.80% Asian, and 0.40% from two or more races. Hispanic or Latino of any race were 2.01% of the population.

There were 120 households, out of which 15.8% had children under the age of 18 living with them, 67.5% were married couples living together, 1.7% had a female householder with no husband present, and 27.5% were non-families. 23.3% of all households were made up of individuals, and 12.5% had someone living alone who was 65 years of age or older. The average household size was 2.08 and the average family size was 2.38.

In the town, the population was spread out, with 11.6% under the age of 18, 2.0% from 18 to 24, 17.3% from 25 to 44, 43.4% from 45 to 64, and 25.7% who were 65 years of age or older. The median age was 53 years. For every 100 females, there were 111.0 males. For every 100 females age 18 and over, there were 101.8 males.

The median income for a household in the town was $32,188, and the median income for a family was $34,107. Males had a median income of $32,500 versus $28,958 for females. The per capita income for the town was $19,809. About 9.7% of families and 14.5% of the population were below the poverty line, including 37.5% of those under the age of eighteen and 3.3% of those 65 or over.
