= Hogarty, Wisconsin =

Unincorporated community in Wisconsin, United States

- Unincorporated community
- Location within Wisconsin Location within the United States
- Coordinates: 45°01′47″N 89°18′20″W
- Country: United States
- State: Wisconsin
- County: Marathon
- Elevation: 1,411 ft (430 m)
- Time zone: UTC-6 (Central (CST))
  - Summer (DST): UTC-5 (CDT)
- Area codes: 715 & 534
- GNIS feature ID: 1566521

Hogarty is an unincorporated community located in the towns of Harrison and Plover, Marathon County, Wisconsin, United States. Hogarty is located on the Eau Claire River at the junction of Wisconsin Highway 52 and County Highway Y, 16.5 miles (26.6 km) east-northeast of Wausau. The community was named for John Crump Hogarty, who opened a trading post in the area in 1850 and became the first postmaster when the post office opened in 1881.
