= Shepley, Wisconsin =

Shepley
- Unincorporated community
- Location within the state of Wisconsin
- Coordinates: 44°51′44″N 89°6′10″W
- Country: United States
- State: Wisconsin
- County: Shawano
- Time zone: UTC-6 (Central (CST))
  - Summer (DST): UTC-5 (CDT)

Shepley is an unincorporated community at the border of the towns of Birnamwood and Almon, Wisconsin in Shawano County, Wisconsin, United States.

== History ==
A post office called Shepley was established in 1907, and remained in operation until it was discontinued in 1935. The community was named for Colonel J. S. Shepley, a local landowner.
