= Harrison, Marathon County, Wisconsin =

Town of Harrison
- Town
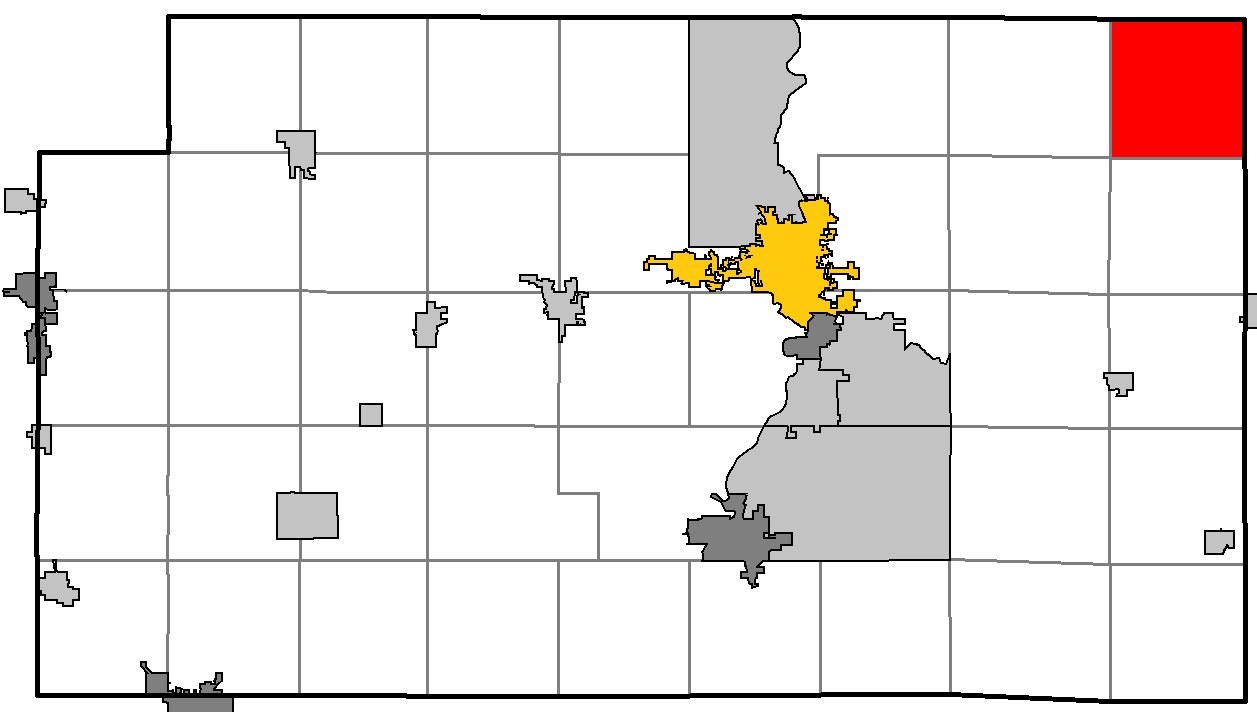
- Location of the Town of Harrison, Marathon County

- Location of Marathon County, Wisconsin
- Coordinates: 45°5′4″N 89°16′9″W
- Country: United States
- State: Wisconsin
- County: Marathon

Area
  - Total: 36.7 sq mi (95.0 km^{2})
  - Land: 36.6 sq mi (94.9 km^{2})
  - Water: 0.039 sq mi (0.1 km^{2})
- Elevation: 1,453 ft (443 m)

Population (2020)
  - Total: 312
  - Density: 8.52/sq mi (3.29/km^{2})
- Time zone: UTC-6 (Central (CST))
  - Summer (DST): UTC-5 (CDT)
- Area codes: 715 & 534
- FIPS code: 55-32900
- GNIS feature ID: 1583357
- Website: https://townofharrisonmcwi.gov/

The Town of Harrison is located in the northeastern corner of Marathon County, Wisconsin, United States. It is part of the Wausau, Wisconsin Metropolitan Statistical Area. As of the 2020 census, the town population was 312. The unincorporated community of Snell is located in the town. The unincorporated community of Hogarty is also located partially in the town.

== Geography ==
According to the United States Census Bureau, the town has a total area of 36.7 square miles (95.0 km^{2}), of which 36.7 square miles (94.9 km^{2}) is land and 0.04 square miles (0.1 km^{2}), or 0.08%, is water.

== Demographics ==
At the 2000 census there were 418 people, 143 households, and 117 families in the town. The population density was 11.4 people per square mile (4.4/km^{2}). There were 155 housing units at an average density of 4.2 per square mile (1.6/km^{2}). The racial makeup of the town was 97.61% White, 0.48% Native American, 0.96% Asian, 0.48% from other races, and 0.48% from two or more races. Hispanic or Latino of any race were 0.72%.

Of the 143 households 39.9% had children under the age of 18 living with them, 68.5% were married couples living together, 5.6% had a female householder with no husband present, and 17.5% were non-families. 14.0% of households were one person and 4.9% were one person aged 65 or older. The average household size was 2.92 and the average family size was 3.25.

The age distribution was 29.9% under the age of 18, 6.5% from 18 to 24, 32.8% from 25 to 44, 20.3% from 45 to 64, and 10.5% 65 or older. The median age was 34 years. For every 100 females, there were 122.3 males. For every 100 females age 18 and over, there were 125.4 males.

The median household income was $40,192 and the median family income was $41,250. Males had a median income of $30,625 versus $19,643 for females. The per capita income for the town was $14,278. About 6.6% of families and 4.6% of the population were below the poverty line, including 5.1% of those under age 18 and 18.9% of those age 65 or over.
