= Aniwa (town), Wisconsin =

Aniwa, Wisconsin
- Town
- Town of Aniwa
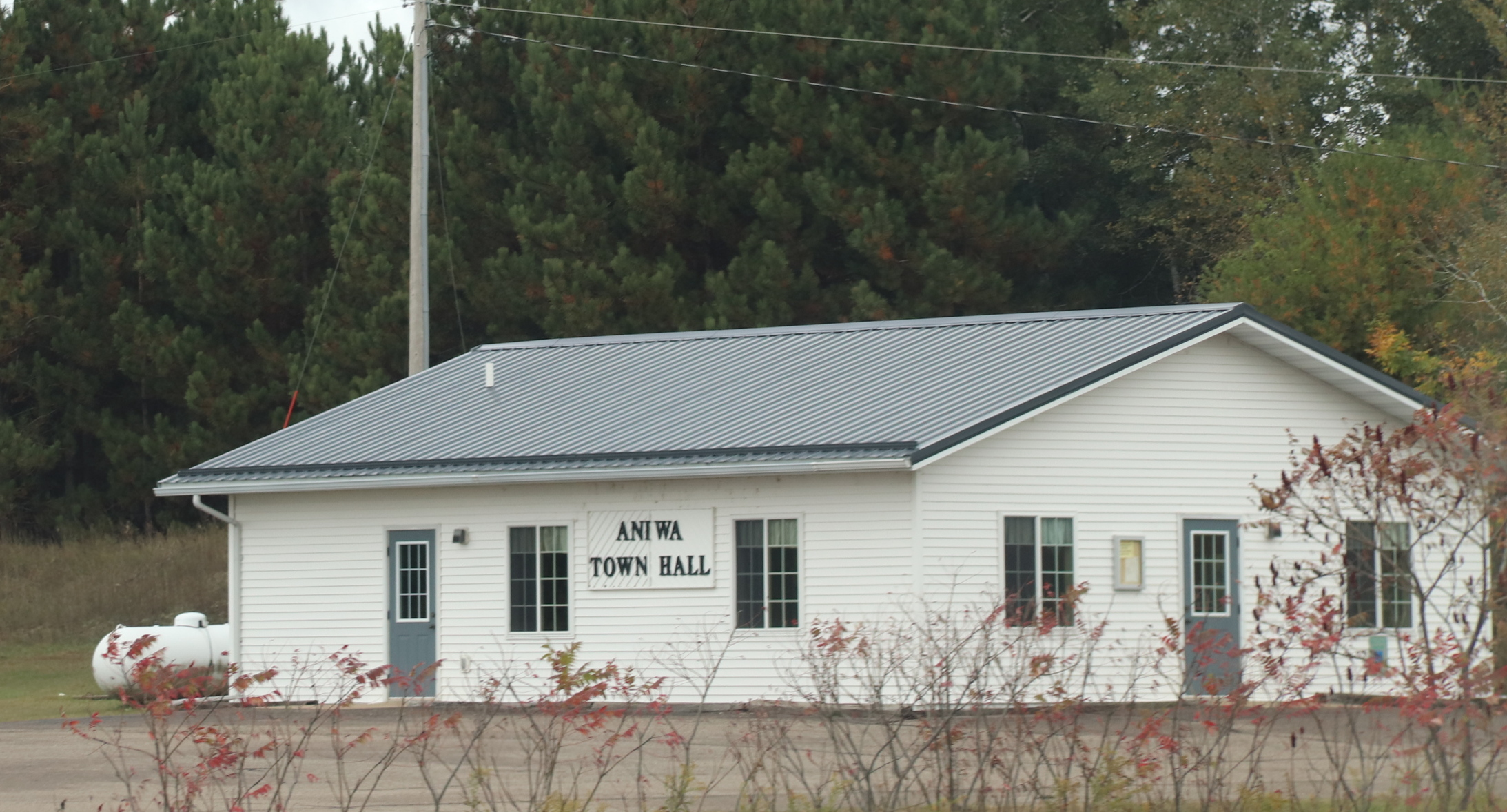
- Aniwa Town Hall

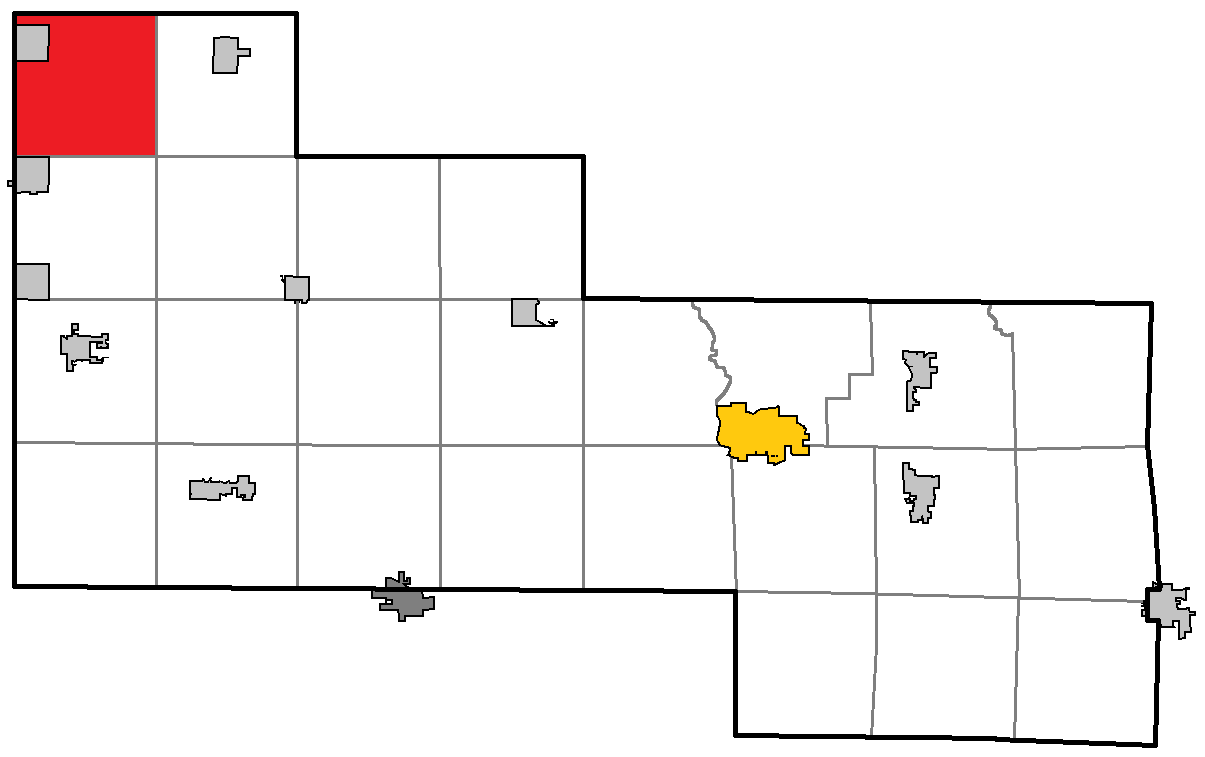
- Location of Aniwa, within Shawano County
- Coordinates: 44°59′00″N 89°09′52″W
- Country: United States
- State: Wisconsin
- County: Shawano

Area
  - Total: 33.27 sq mi (86.2 km^{2})
  - Land: 33.24 sq mi (86.1 km^{2})
  - Water: 0.03 sq mi (0.078 km^{2})

Population (2020)
  - Total: 517
  - Density: 15.6/sq mi (6.01/km^{2})
- Time zone: UTC-6 (Central (CST))
  - Summer (DST): UTC-5 (CDT)
- Area code(s): 715 & 534
- GNIS feature ID: 1582698

Aniwa is a town in Shawano County, Wisconsin, United States. The population was 517 at the 2020 census. The Village of Aniwa is located within the town.

== Geography ==
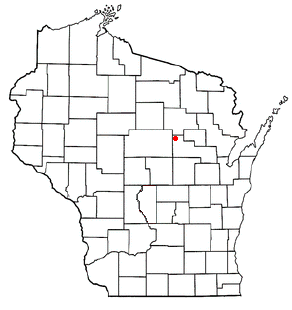
Location of Aniwa (town), Wisconsin

According to the United States Census Bureau, the town has a total area of 33.5 square miles (86.7 km^{2}), of which 33.2 square miles (86.0 km^{2}) is land and 0.3 square mile (0.7 km^{2}) (0.81%) is water.

== Demographics ==
At the 2000 census, there were 586 people, 202 households and 157 families residing in the town. The population density was 17.7 people per square mile (6.8/km^{2}). There were 212 housing units at an average density of 6.4 per square mile (2.5/km^{2}). The racial makeup of the town was 98.46% White, 0.51% Black or African American, 0.34% Native American, 0.17% Pacific Islander, and 0.51% from two or more races. 0.17% of the population were Hispanic or Latino of any race.

There were 202 households, of which 42.1% had children under the age of 18 living with them, 66.3% were married couples living together, 7.4% had a female householder with no husband present, and 21.8% were non-families. 17.3% of all households were made up of individuals, and 5.9% had someone living alone who was 65 years of age or older. The average household size was 2.90 and the average family size was 3.28.

Age distribution was 31.4% under the age of 18, 5.3% from 18 to 24, 29.4% from 25 to 44, 22.0% from 45 to 64, and 11.9% who were 65 years of age or older. The median age was 36 years. For every 100 females, there were 114.7 males. For every 100 females age 18 and over, there were 109.4 males.

The median household income was $40,208, and the median family income was $42,031. Males had a median income of $29,688 versus $23,393 for females. The per capita income for the town was $14,285. About 6.7% of families and 9.1% of the population were below the poverty line, including 13.6% of those under age 18 and none of those age 65 or over.
