= Birnamwood (town), Wisconsin =

Human settlement in United States of America

Coordinates: 44°54′39″N 89°09′16″W

Birnamwood
- Town
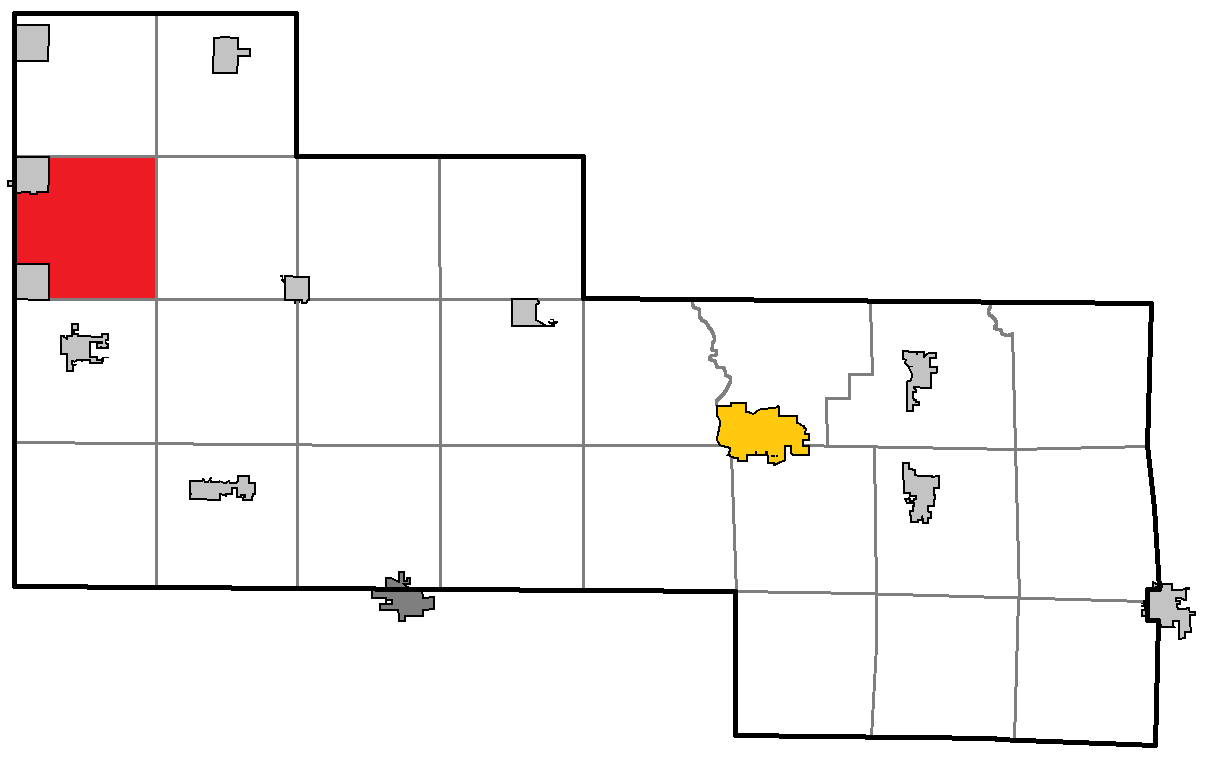
- Location of Birnamwood, within Shawano County
- Country: United States
- State: Wisconsin
- County: Shawano

Area
  - Total: 31.4 sq mi (81 km^{2})
  - Land: 31.4 sq mi (81 km^{2})
  - Water: 0.0 sq mi (0 km^{2})

Population (2020)
  - Total: 682
  - Density: 21.7/sq mi (8.39/km^{2})
- Time zone: UTC-6 (CST)
  - Summer (DST): UTC-5 (CDT)
- Website: https://townofbirnamwood.wi.gov/
- Includes parts of Paac Ciinak and Shepley

Birnamwood is a town in Shawano County, Wisconsin, United States. The population was 682 at the 2020 United States census. The unincorporated communities of Paac Ciinak and Shepley is located partially in the town. The Village of Birnamwood is located mostly within the town.

== Geography ==
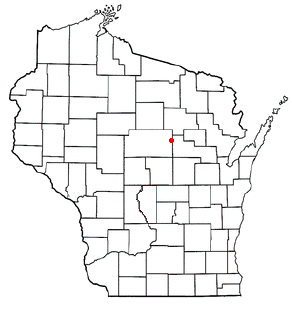
Location of Birnamwood (town), Wisconsin

According to the United States Census Bureau, the town has a total area of 31.4 square miles (81.3 km^{2}), all land.

== Demographics ==
At the 2000 United States census there were 711 people, 259 households, and 197 families in the town. The population density was 22.6 people per square mile (8.7/km^{2}). There were 309 housing units at an average density of 9.8 per square mile (3.8/km^{2}). The racial makeup of the town was 89.73% White, 8.44% Native American, 1.13% Asian, and 0.70% from two or more races. Hispanic or Latino of any race were 1.13%.

Of the 259 households 32.4% had children under the age of 18 living with them, 61.4% were married couples living together, 7.7% had a female householder with no husband present, and 23.9% were non-families. 18.1% of households were one person and 5.8% were one person aged 65 or older. The average household size was 2.75 and the average family size was 3.13.

The age distribution was 27.7% under the age of 18, 7.6% from 18 to 24, 32.1% from 25 to 44, 22.4% from 45 to 64, and 10.3% 65 or older. The median age was 35 years. For every 100 females, there were 106.7 males. For every 100 females age 18 and over, there were 104.0 males.

The median household income was $40,469 and the median family income was $49,318. Males had a median income of $28,594 versus $21,875 for females. The per capita income for the town was $18,782. About 7.1% of families and 11.7% of the population were below the poverty line, including 19.9% of those under age 18 and 10.8% of those age 65 or over.
