= James Waddington =

American politician

James Seymour Waddington (November 12, 1831 – 1917) was a member of the Wisconsin State Senate.

He was born in Chautauqua County, New York. He moved to Wiota, Wisconsin in 1841 before moving to Belvidere, Illinois in 1844 and to Argyle, Wisconsin in 1848.

== Career ==
Waddington was a member of the Senate representing the 12th district. Previously, he was a Lafayette County, Wisconsin judge from 1878 to 1882. He was a Republican.
