= Morris, Wisconsin =

- Town
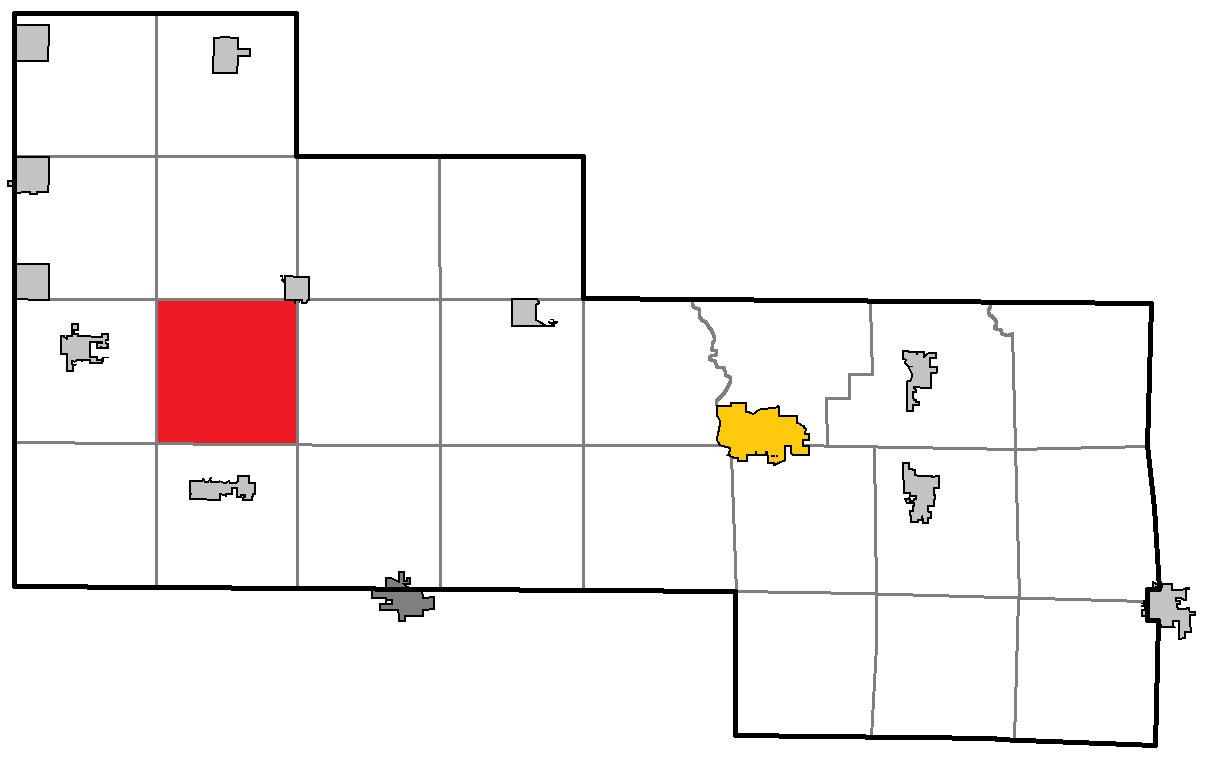
- Location of Morris, within Shawano County
- Coordinates: 44°49′23″N 89°2′43″W
- Country: United States
- State: Wisconsin
- County: Shawano

Area
  - Total: 36.2 sq mi (93.8 km^{2})
  - Land: 36.2 sq mi (93.8 km^{2})
  - Water: 0 sq mi (0.0 km^{2})
- Elevation: 1,066 ft (325 m)

Population (2020)
  - Total: 374
  - Density: 10.3/sq mi (3.99/km^{2})
- Time zone: UTC-6 (Central (CST))
  - Summer (DST): UTC-5 (CDT)
- FIPS code: 55-54250
- GNIS feature ID: 1583752

Morris is a town in Shawano County, Wisconsin, United States. As of the 2020 Census, the town population was 374. The unincorporated community of Five Corners is located in the town.

== Geography ==
According to the United States Census Bureau, the town has a total area of 36.2 square miles (93.8 km^{2}), all land.

== Demographics ==
As of the census of 2020, there were 417 people, 190 households, and 135 families residing in the town. The population density was 13.4 people per square mile (5.2/km^{2}). There were 217 housing units at an average density of 6.0 per square mile (2.3/km^{2}). The racial makeup of the town was 92.16% White, 0.21% African American, 4.54% Native American, 0.21% Asian, 0.62% from other races, and 2.27% from two or more races. Hispanic or Latino of any race were 0.62% of the population.

There were 181 households, out of which 34.3% had children under the age of 18 living with them, 63.5% were married couples living together, 6.6% had a female householder with no husband present, and 24.9% were non-families. 20.4% of all households were made up of individuals, and 8.3% had someone living alone who was 65 years of age or older. The average household size was 2.68 and the average family size was 3.09.

In the town, the population was spread out, with 25.4% under the age of 18, 8.0% from 18 to 24, 28.0% from 25 to 44, 25.2% from 45 to 64, and 13.4% who were 65 years of age or older. The median age was 39 years. For every 100 females, there were 113.7 males. For every 100 females age 18 and over, there were 118.1 males.

The median income for a household in the town was $36,875, and the median income for a family was $40,833. Males had a median income of $24,792 versus $24,792 for females. The per capita income for the town was $14,627. About 16.4% of families and 17.6% of the population were below the poverty line, including 20.9% of those under age 18 and 18.3% of those age 65 or over.
