= Almon, Wisconsin =

- Town
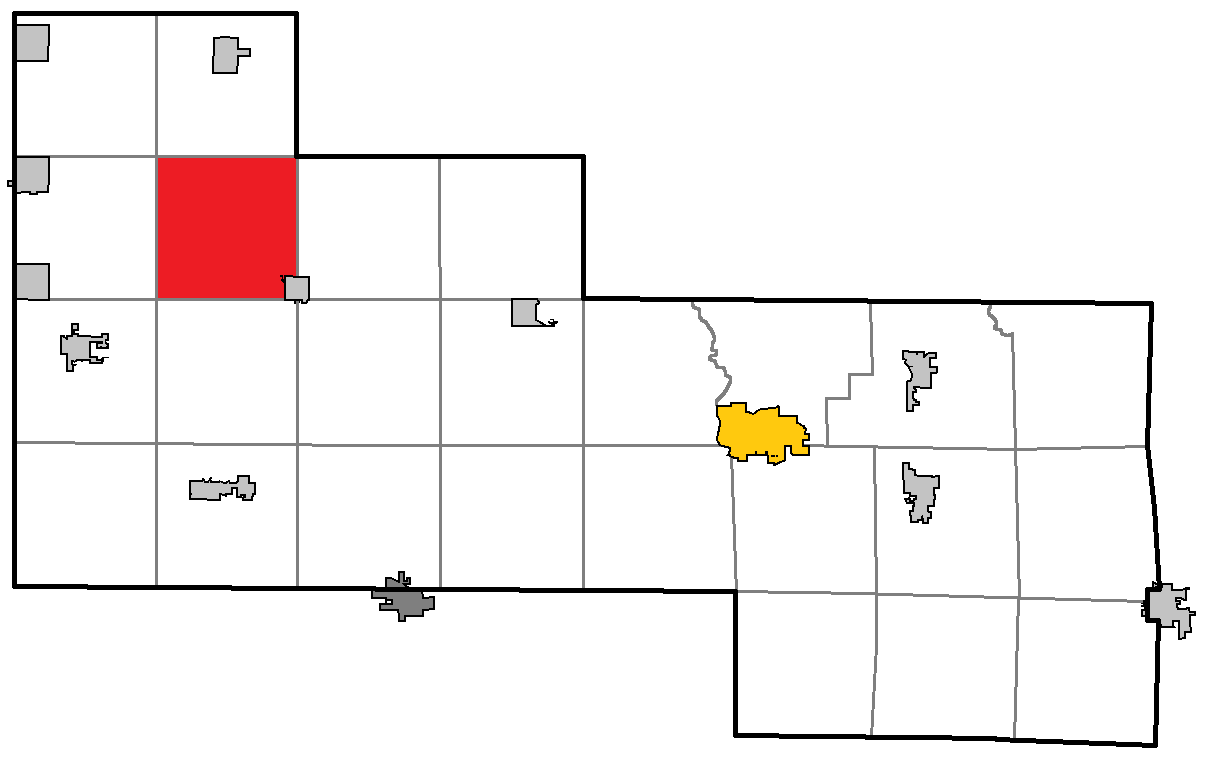
- Location of Almon, within Shawano County
- Coordinates: 44°54′11″N 89°3′8″W
- Country: United States
- State: Wisconsin
- County: Shawano

Area
  - Total: 35.2 sq mi (91.1 km^{2})
  - Land: 35.1 sq mi (91.0 km^{2})
  - Water: 0.039 sq mi (0.1 km^{2})
- Elevation: 1,155 ft (352 m)

Population (2020)
  - Total: 575
  - Density: 16.4/sq mi (6.32/km^{2})
- Time zone: UTC-6 (Central (CST))
  - Summer (DST): UTC-5 (CDT)
- FIPS code: 55-01375
- GNIS feature ID: 1582681

Almon is a town in Shawano County, Wisconsin, United States. The population was 575 at the 2020 census. The unincorporated communities of Almon and Regina are located in the town. The unincorporated community of Shepley is also located partially in the town.

== Geography ==
According to the United States Census Bureau, the town has a total area of 35.2 square miles (91.1 km^{2}), of which 35.1 square miles (91.0 km^{2}) is land and 0.1 square mile (0.2 km^{2}) (0.17%) is water.

== Demographics ==
As of the census of 2000, there were 591 people, 224 households, and 172 families residing in the town. The population density was 16.8 people per square mile (6.5/km^{2}). There were 271 housing units at an average density of 7.7 per square mile (3.0/km^{2}). The racial makeup of the town was 92.55% White, 3.89% Native American, 0.85% Asian, 0.17% from other races, and 2.54% from two or more races. Hispanic or Latino of any race were 1.02% of the population.

There were 224 households, out of which 33.0% had children under the age of 18 living with them, 63.4% were married couples living together, 8.0% had a female householder with no husband present, and 23.2% were non-families. 18.3% of all households were made up of individuals, and 8.9% had someone living alone who was 65 years of age or older. The average household size was 2.64 and the average family size was 2.98.

In the town, the population was spread out, with 26.7% under the age of 18, 9.0% from 18 to 24, 26.9% from 25 to 44, 23.2% from 45 to 64, and 14.2% who were 65 years of age or older. The median age was 39 years. For every 100 females, there were 111.8 males. For every 100 females age 18 and over, there were 108.2 males.

The median income for a household in the town was $37,663, and the median income for a family was $39,022. Males had a median income of $25,500 versus $21,964 for females. The per capita income for the town was $15,893. About 9.1% of families and 16.2% of the population were below the poverty line, including 25.1% of those under age 18 and 15.2% of those age 65 or over.
