= Riverview, Wisconsin =

- Town
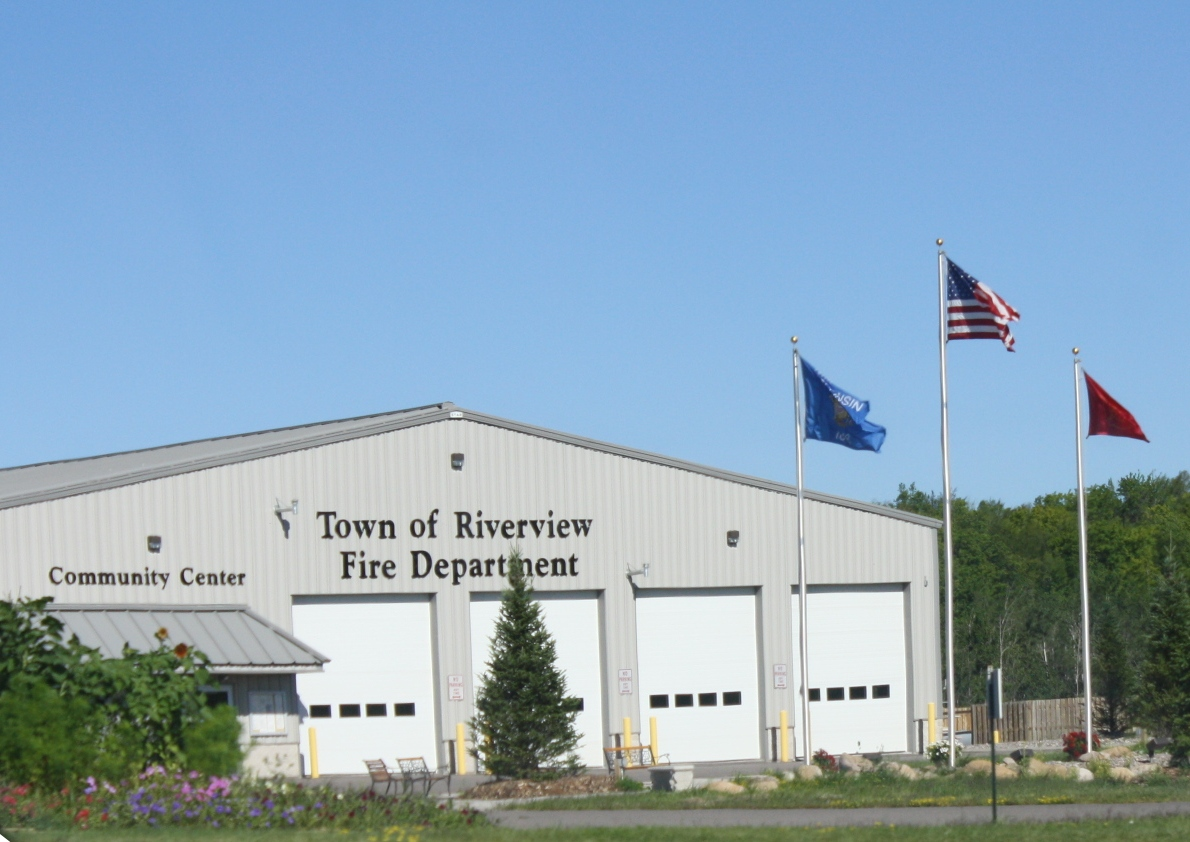
- Fire Department and Community Center

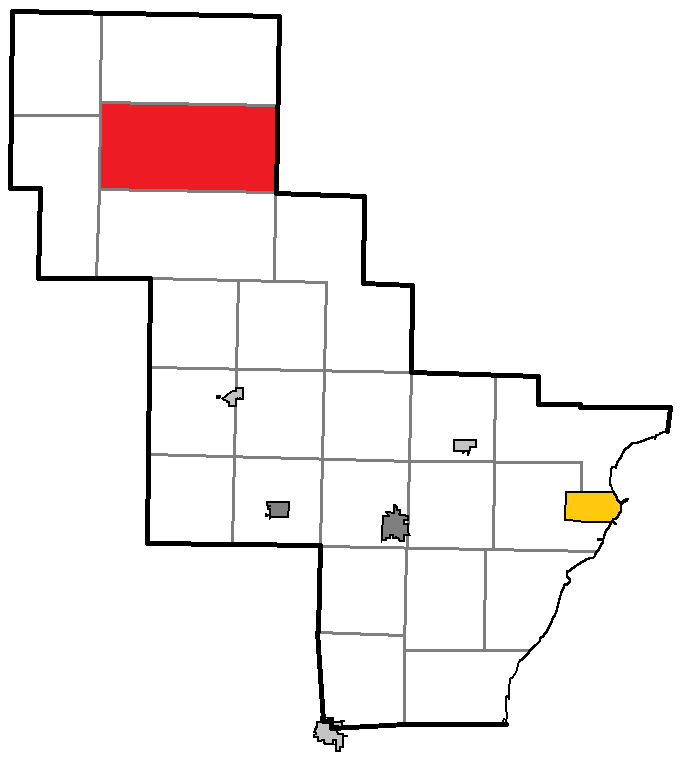
- Location of Riverview, within Oconto County
- Coordinates: 45°15′15″N 88°26′32″W
- Country: United States
- State: Wisconsin
- County: Oconto

Area
  - Total: 71.7 sq mi (185.8 km^{2})
  - Land: 69.7 sq mi (180.6 km^{2})
  - Water: 2.0 sq mi (5.2 km^{2})
- Elevation: 1,047 ft (319 m)

Population (2020)
  - Total: 819
  - Density: 11.7/sq mi (4.53/km^{2})
- Time zone: UTC-6 (Central (CST))
  - Summer (DST): UTC-5 (CDT)
- FIPS code: 55-68400
- GNIS feature ID: 1584044
- Website: https://www.ocontocountywi.gov/498/Town-of-Riverview

Riverview is a town in Oconto County, Wisconsin, United States. The population was 819 at the 2020 census, down from 824 in 2000.

The ghost town of Pine Stump is located in the town on the intersection of Tar Dam Road and Old Highway 32 Road. All that remains of the settlement is a pile of rubble, the old schoolhouse. The Tar School opened in 1907. The school was closed in 1952 after joining the Mountain School District. It is now the site of the town's recycling center. The school was also known as the Grimmer school because the Grimmer family owned the land. Students came from the town of Pine Stump, which is now abandoned.

== Geography ==
According to the United States Census Bureau, the town has a total area of 71.7 square miles (185.8 km^{2}), of which 69.7 square miles (180.6 km^{2}) is land and 2.0 square miles (5.2 km^{2}) (2.80%) is water.

== 2007 Tornado ==
On June 7, 2007, an EF3 tornado struck the town of Riverview. The town municipal building and fire department were destroyed, along with nine homes.

== Demographics ==
As of the census of 2000, there were 829 people, 415 households, and 275 families residing in the town. The population density was 11.9 people per square mile (4.6/km^{2}). There were 1,552 housing units at an average density of 22.3 per square mile (8.6/km^{2}). The racial makeup of the town was 98.31% White, 0.36% Native American, 0.12% from other races, and 1.21% from two or more races. Hispanic or Latino of any race were 0.36% of the population.

There were 415 households, out of which 12.8% had children under the age of 18 living with them, 59.5% were married couples living together, 4.1% had a female householder with no husband present, and 33.5% were non-families. 29.6% of all households were made up of individuals, and 13.3% had someone living alone who was 65 years of age or older. The average household size was 2.00 and the average family size was 2.37.

In the town, the population was spread out, with 11.6% under the age of 18, 3.1% from 18 to 24, 18.5% from 25 to 44, 37.4% from 45 to 64, and 29.4% who were 65 years of age or older. The median age was 55 years. For every 100 females, there were 111.5 males. For every 100 females age 18 and over, there were 106.5 males.

The median income for a household in the town was $32,550, and the median income for a family was $37,279. Males had a median income of $30,556 versus $20,357 for females. The per capita income for the town was $19,272. About 4.4% of families and 6.4% of the population were below the poverty line, including 12.1% of those under age 18 and 5.3% of those age 65 or over.
