= Texas, Wisconsin =

Town of Texas
- Town
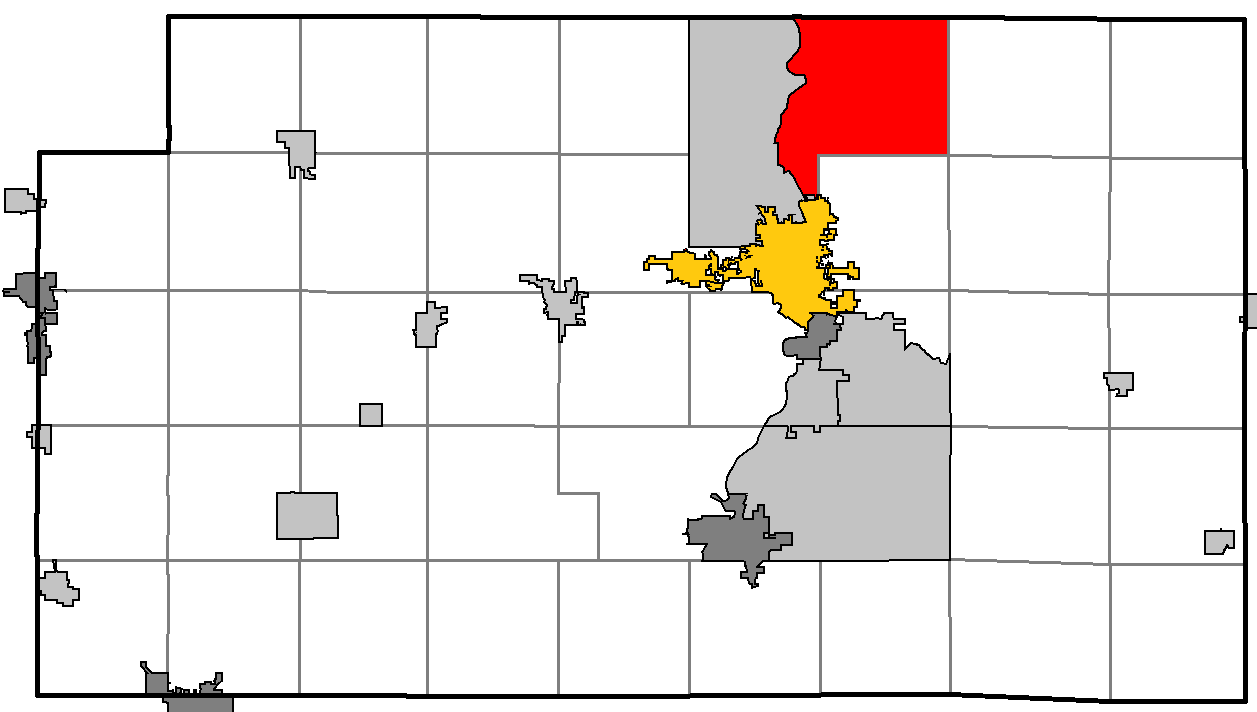
- Location of the Town of Texas, Marathon County

- Location of Marathon County, Wisconsin
- Coordinates: 45°4′11″N 89°34′49″W
- Country: United States
- State: Wisconsin
- County: Marathon

Area
  - Total: 45.1 sq mi (116.7 km^{2})
  - Land: 44.6 sq mi (115.5 km^{2})
  - Water: 0.46 sq mi (1.2 km^{2})
- Elevation: 1,306 ft (398 m)

Population (2020)
  - Total: 1,611
  - Density: 36.13/sq mi (13.95/km^{2})
- Time zone: UTC-6 (Central (CST))
  - Summer (DST): UTC-5 (CDT)
- Area codes: 715 & 534
- FIPS code: 55-79350
- GNIS feature ID: 1584270
- Website: townoftexas.com

The Town of Texas is located in Marathon County, Wisconsin, United States. It is part of the Wausau, Wisconsin Metropolitan Statistical Area. The population was 1,611 at the 2020 census. The unincorporated community of Granite Heights is located in the town.

== Geography ==
According to the United States Census Bureau, the town has a total area of 45.1 square miles (116.7 km^{2}), of which 44.6 square miles (115.5 km^{2}) is land and 0.5 square miles (1.2 km^{2}), or 1.02%, is water.

== Demographics ==
At the 2000 census there were 1,703 people, 608 households, and 493 families living in the town. The population density was 38.2 people per square mile (14.7/km^{2}). There were 625 housing units at an average density of 14.0 per square mile (5.4/km^{2}). The racial makeup of the town was 97.06% White, 0.82% African American, 0.18% Native American, 1.23% Asian, 0.18% from other races, and 0.53% from two or more races. Hispanic or Latino of any race were 0.23%.

Of the 608 households 34.5% had children under the age of 18 living with them, 71.2% were married couples living together, 6.3% had a female householder with no husband present, and 18.9% were non-families. 16.0% of households were one person and 7.1% were one person aged 65 or older. The average household size was 2.80 and the average family size was 3.14.

The age distribution was 24.9% under the age of 18, 8.2% from 18 to 24, 28.7% from 25 to 44, 26.8% from 45 to 64, and 11.3% 65 or older. The median age was 39 years. For every 100 females, there were 104.7 males. For every 100 females age 18 and over, there were 104.6 males.

The median household income was $51,830 and the median family income was $57,024. Males had a median income of $35,313 versus $23,304 for females. The per capita income for the town was $18,852. About 3.7% of families and 4.1% of the population were below the poverty line, including 3.6% of those under age 18 and 7.3% of those age 65 or over.
