= Bagley, Oconto County, Wisconsin =

Bagley, Wisconsin
- Town
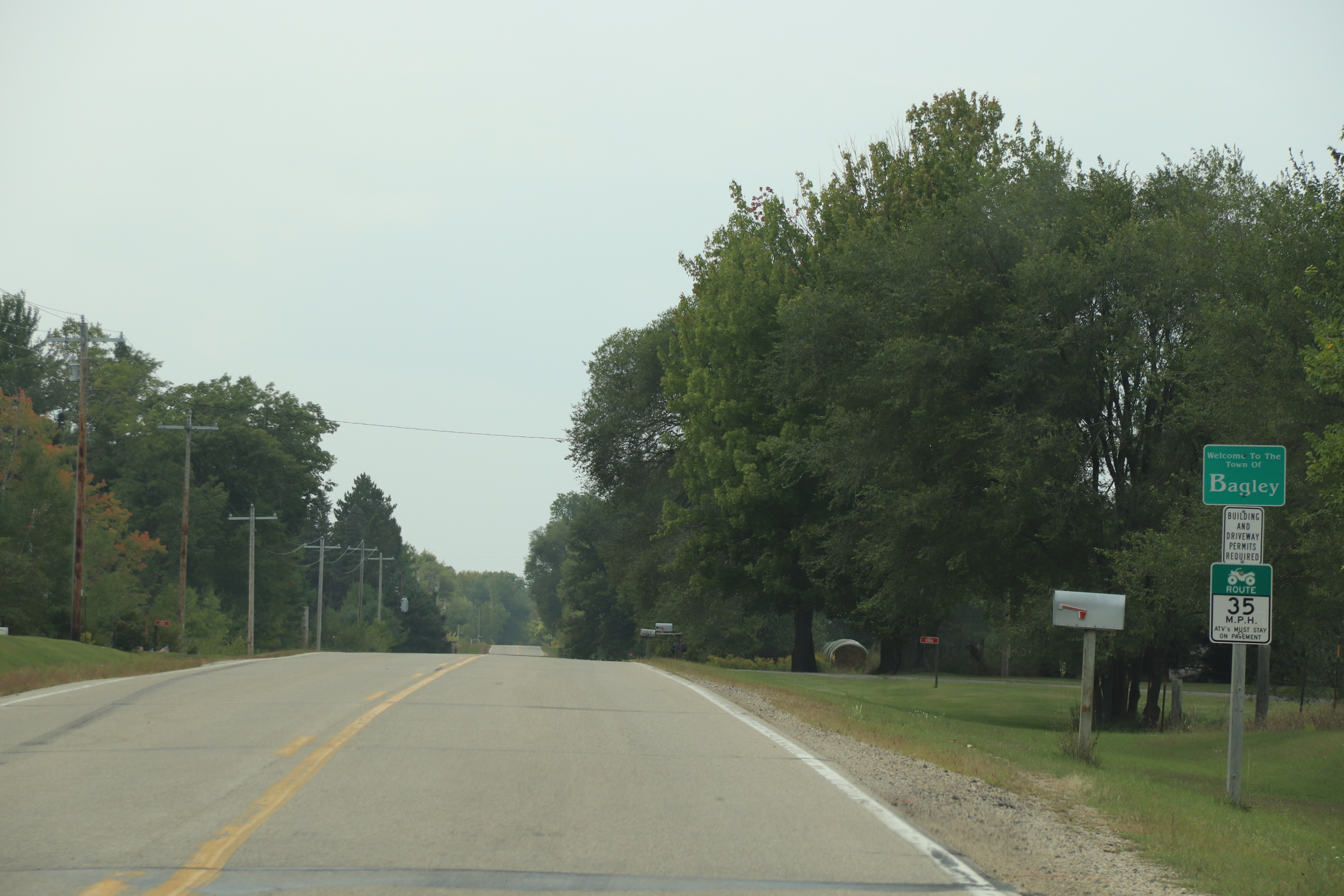
- Looking west at the town's sign on County Z

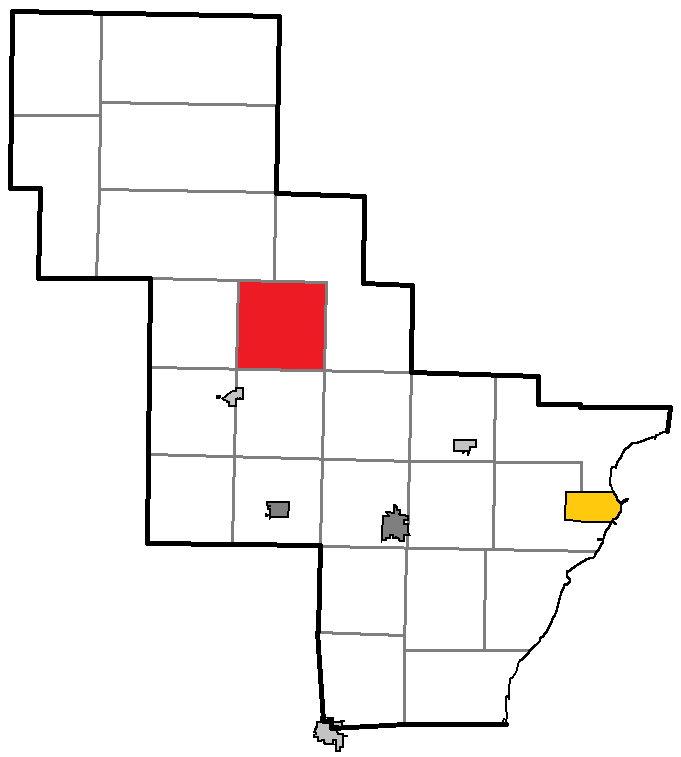
- Location of Bagley, within Oconto County
- Coordinates: 45°3′44″N 88°16′56″W
- Country: United States
- State: Wisconsin
- County: Oconto

Area
  - Total: 35.7 sq mi (92.4 km^{2})
  - Land: 34.8 sq mi (90.2 km^{2})
  - Water: 0.89 sq mi (2.3 km^{2})
- Elevation: 860 ft (262 m)

Population (2020)
  - Total: 275
  - Density: 7.90/sq mi (3.05/km^{2})
- Time zone: UTC-6 (Central (CST))
  - Summer (DST): UTC-5 (CDT)
- FIPS code: 55-04275
- GNIS feature ID: 1582741

There is also the village of Bagley in Grant County, Wisconsin.

Bagley is a town in Oconto County, Wisconsin, United States. The population was 275 at the 2020 United States census. The town was originally a logging camp that turned into a small community. The town was built and named for the Bagley family. The town is located on the Oconto River. On this particular section, it is very shallow and makes floating the logs a difficult task. The dams were broken and the resulting flood took the logs with it. As trees disappeared, so did the settlement. Most men left and joined the CCC in the 1930s. The settlement continued to downsize and since, all that remains is few homes.

== Geography ==
According to the United States Census Bureau, the town has a total area of 35.7 square miles (92.4 km^{2}), with 34.8 square miles (90.2 km^{2}) of land and 0.9 square miles (2.3 km^{2}) (2.44%) of water.

== Demographics ==
As of the census of 2000, there were 333 people, 136 households, and 91 families residing in the town. The population density was 9.6 people per square mile (3.7/km^{2}). There were 229 housing units at an average density of 6.6 per square mile (2.5/km^{2}). The racial makeup of the town was 96.4% White, 0.6% Native American, 2.7% from other races, and 0.3% from two or more races. Hispanic or Latino people of any race were 2.7% of the population.

There were 136 households, out of which 25.7% had children under the age of 18 living with them, 61.8% were married couples living together, 3.7% had a female householder with no husband present, and 32.4% were non-families. 28.7% of all households were made up of individuals, and 14% had someone living alone who was 65 years of age or older. The average household size was 2.45 and the average family size was 3.00.

The town's population spread was 23.4% under the age of 18, 7.5% from 18 to 24, 23.7% from 25 to 44, 29.4% from 45 to 64, and 15.9% who were 65 years of age or older. The median age was 40 years. For every 100 females, there were 117.6 males. For every 100 females age 18 and over, there were 105.6 males.

The median income for a household in the town was $36,875, and the median income for a family was $44,688. Males had a median income of $31,500 versus $20,625 for females. The per capita income for the town was $15,241. About 5.9% of families and 13.5% of the population were below the poverty line, including 16% of those under age 18 and 5.1% of those age 65 or over.
