= Seneca, Shawano County, Wisconsin =

Seneca, Wisconsin
- Town
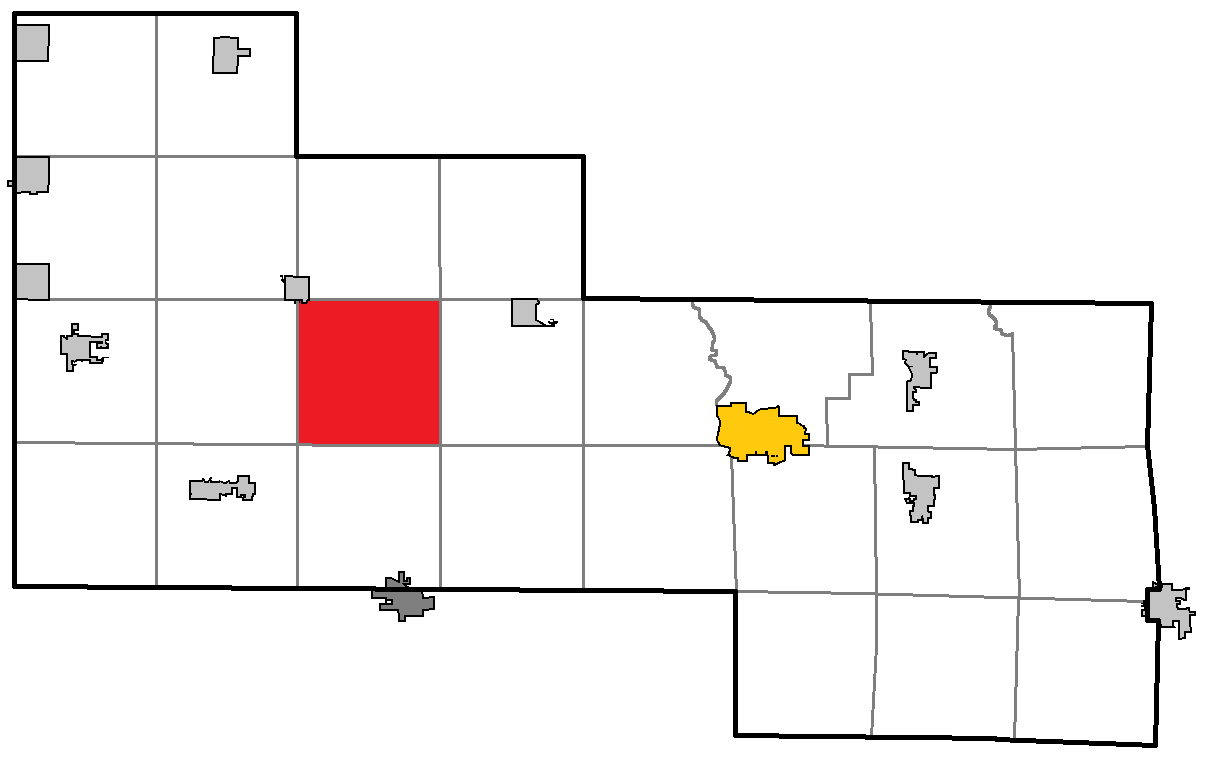
- Location of Seneca, within Shawano County, Wisconsin
- Coordinates: 44°48′53″N 88°54′58″W
- Country: United States
- State: Wisconsin
- County: Shawano

Area
  - Total: 36.6 sq mi (94.9 km^{2})
  - Land: 36.6 sq mi (94.7 km^{2})
  - Water: 0.077 sq mi (0.2 km^{2})
- Elevation: 968 ft (295 m)

Population (2020)
  - Total: 495
  - Density: 13.5/sq mi (5.23/km^{2})
- Time zone: UTC-6 (Central (CST))
  - Summer (DST): UTC-5 (CDT)
- FIPS code: 55-72550
- GNIS feature ID: 1584123
- Website: http://www.senecawi.com/

Seneca is a town in Shawano County, Wisconsin, United States. As of the 2020 census, the town population was 495. The unincorporated community of Tilleda is located within the town.

== Geography ==
According to the United States Census Bureau, the town has a total area of 36.7 square miles (94.9 km^{2}), of which 36.6 square miles (94.7 km^{2}) is land and 0.1 square mile (0.2 km^{2}) (0.25%) is water.

== Demographics ==
At the 2000 census there were 567 people, 204 households, and 156 families in the town. The population density was 15.5 people per square mile (6.0/km^{2}). There were 255 housing units at an average density of 7.0 per square mile (2.7/km^{2}). The racial makeup of the town was 94.89% White, 2.12% Native American, 0.35% Asian, 0.18% from other races, and 2.47% from two or more races. Hispanic or Latino of any race were 0.53%.

Of the 204 households 30.4% had children under the age of 18 living with them, 64.7% were married couples living together, 9.8% had a female householder with no husband present, and 23.5% were non-families. 17.2% of households were one person and 7.4% were one person aged 65 or older. The average household size was 2.78 and the average family size was 3.16.

The age distribution was 26.3% under the age of 18, 7.1% from 18 to 24, 28.6% from 25 to 44, 21.9% from 45 to 64, and 16.2% 65 or older. The median age was 38 years. For every 100 females, there were 90.9 males. For every 100 females age 18 and over, there were 95.3 males.

The median household income was $38,750 and the median family income was $43,750. Males had a median income of $26,250 versus $23,500 for females. The per capita income for the town was $15,601. About 9.3% of families and 13.2% of the population were below the poverty line, including 26.7% of those under age 18 and 10.5% of those age 65 or over.

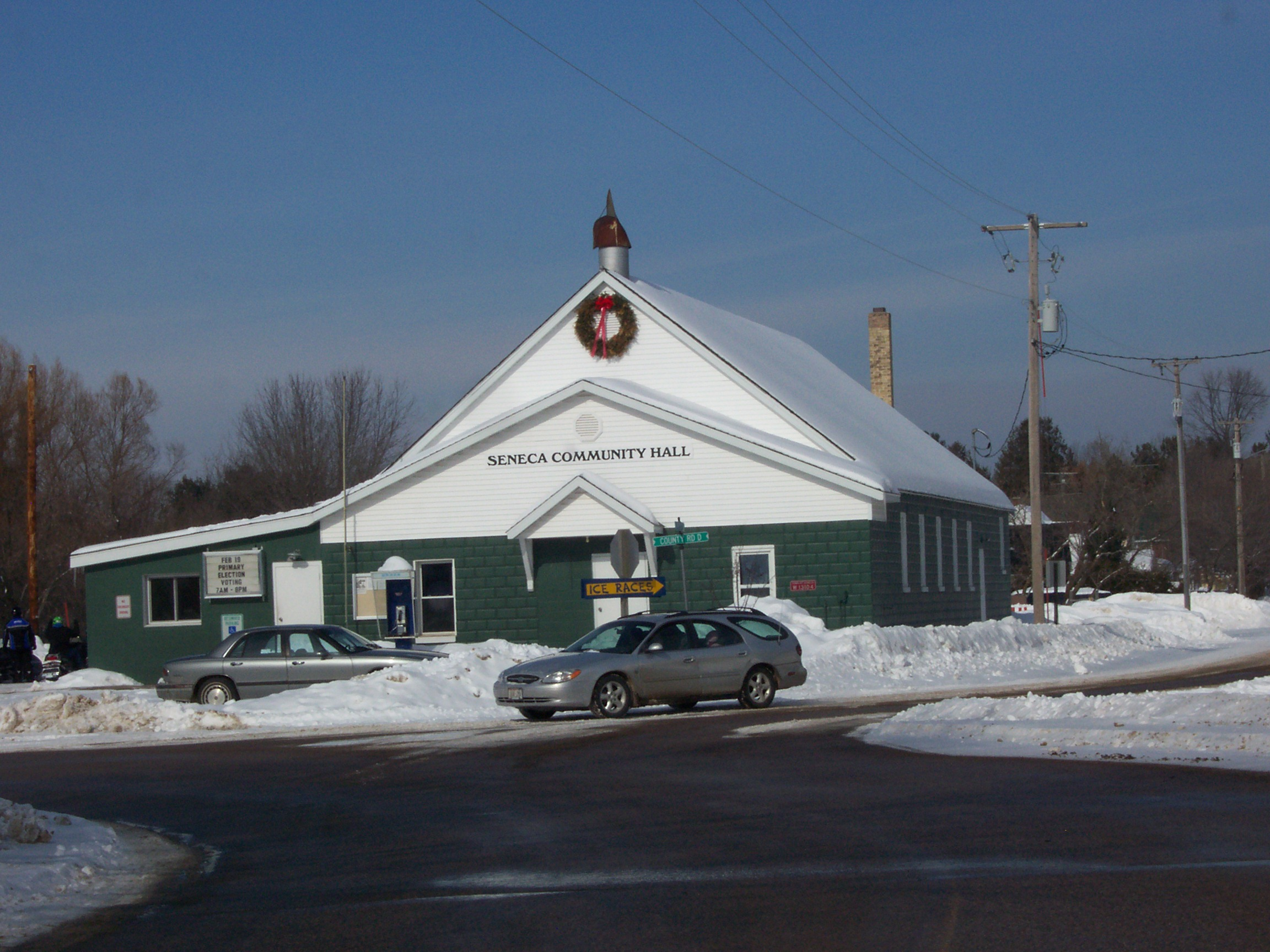
Seneca Community Hall
