= Niagara (town), Wisconsin =

Niagara, Wisconsin
- Town
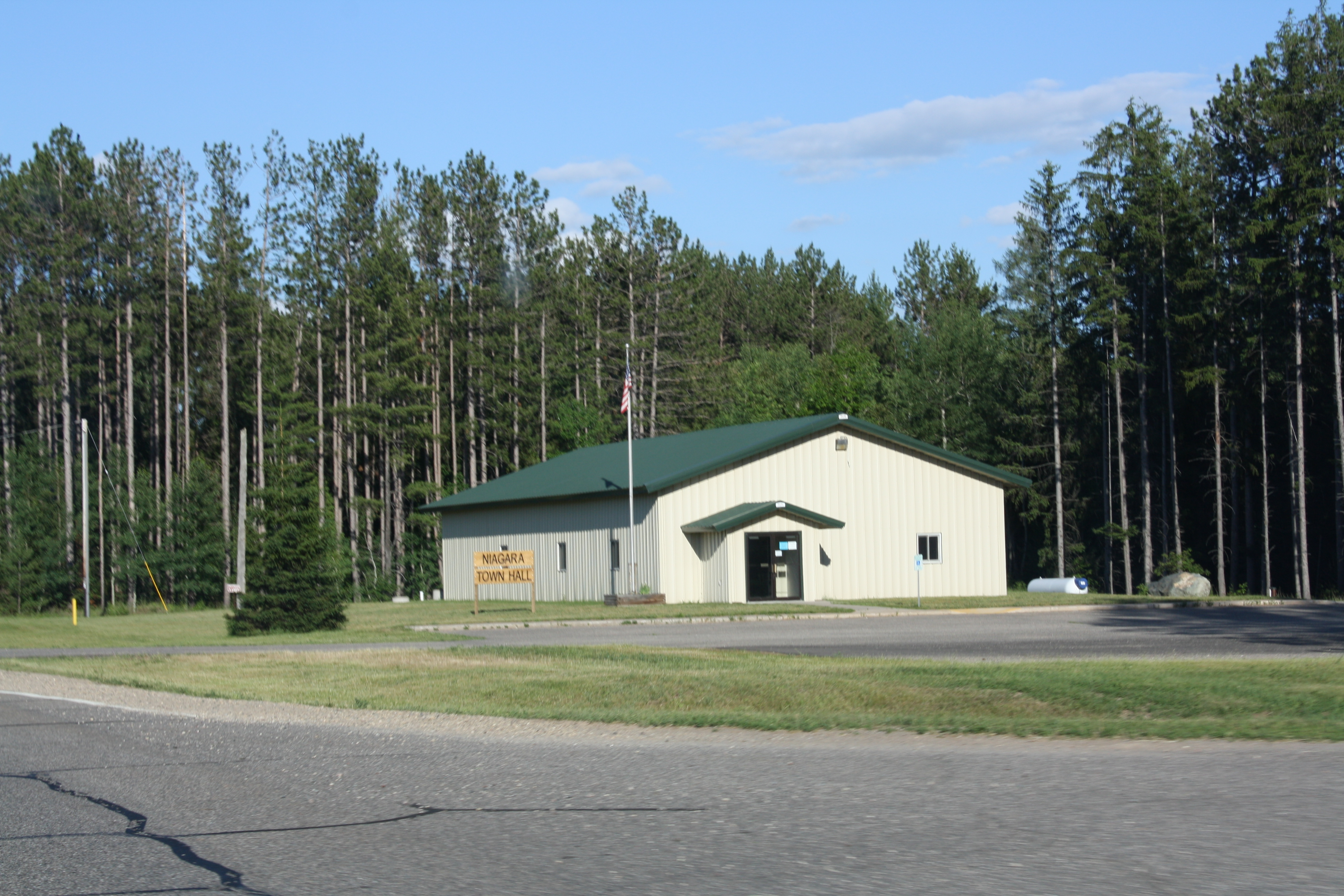
- Town hall nestled in the forest typical of the town

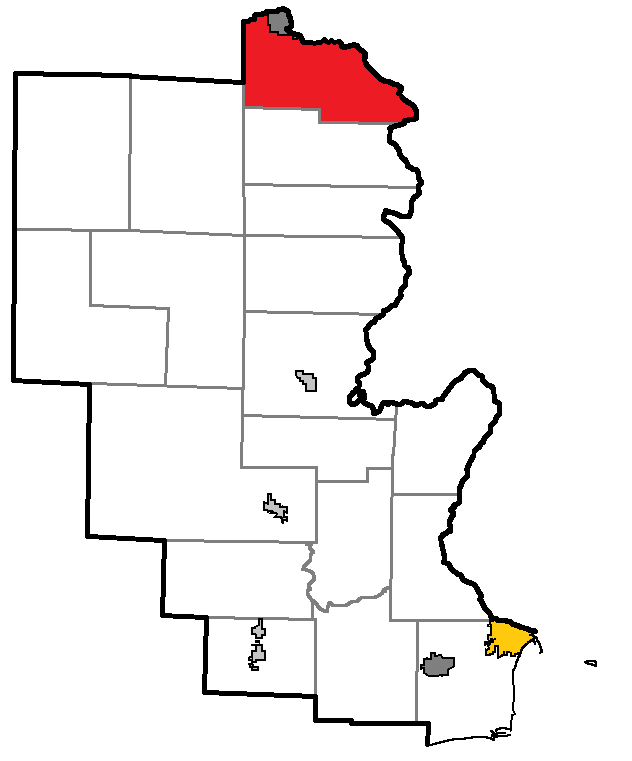
- Location of Niagara, within Marinette County
- Coordinates: 45°43′39″N 87°57′14″W
- Country: United States
- State: Wisconsin
- County: Marinette

Area
  - Total: 68.3 sq mi (177.0 km^{2})
  - Land: 67.1 sq mi (173.8 km^{2})
  - Water: 1.2 sq mi (3.2 km^{2})
- Elevation: 1,024 ft (312 m)

Population (2020)
  - Total: 852
  - Density: 12.7/sq mi (4.90/km^{2})
- Time zone: UTC-6 (Central (CST))
  - Summer (DST): UTC-5 (CDT)
- Area codes: 715 & 534
- FIPS code: 55-57350
- GNIS feature ID: 1583820
- Website: https://www.townofniagarawi.com/

Niagara is a town in Marinette County, Wisconsin, United States. The population was 852 at the 2020 census. The city of Niagara is located to the north of and adjacent to the town.

== Geography ==
According to the United States Census Bureau, the town has a total area of 68.4 square miles (177.1 km^{2}), of which 67.1 square miles (173.8 km^{2}) is land and 1.2 square miles (3.2 km^{2}) (1.83%) is water.

== Demographics ==
As of the census of 2000, there were 924 people, 348 households, and 263 families residing in the town. The population density was 13.8 inhabitants per square mile (5.3/km^{2}). There were 453 housing units at an average density of 6.8 per square mile (2.6/km^{2}). The racial makeup of the town was 98.16% White, 0.32% Black or African American, 0.32% Native American, 0.43% Asian, 0.32% from other races, and 0.43% from two or more races. 1.08% of the population were Hispanic or Latino of any race.

There were 348 households, out of which 37.4% had children under the age of 18 living with them, 68.1% were married couples living together, 3.4% had a female householder with no husband present, and 24.4% were non-families. 19.5% of all households were made up of individuals, and 8.0% had someone living alone who was 65 years of age or older. The average household size was 2.66 and the average family size was 3.09.

In the town, the population was spread out, with 28.8% under the age of 18, 5.6% from 18 to 24, 30.2% from 25 to 44, 23.5% from 45 to 64, and 11.9% who were 65 years of age or older. The median age was 38 years. For every 100 females, there were 108.6 males. For every 100 females age 18 and over, there were 106.3 males.

The median income for a household in the town was $40,250, and the median income for a family was $50,347. Males had a median income of $41,719 versus $32,250 for females. The per capita income for the town was $17,504. About 5.2% of families and 6.4% of the population were below the poverty line, including 7.5% of those under age 18 and 6.1% of those age 65 or over.
