= Germania, Wisconsin =

- Town
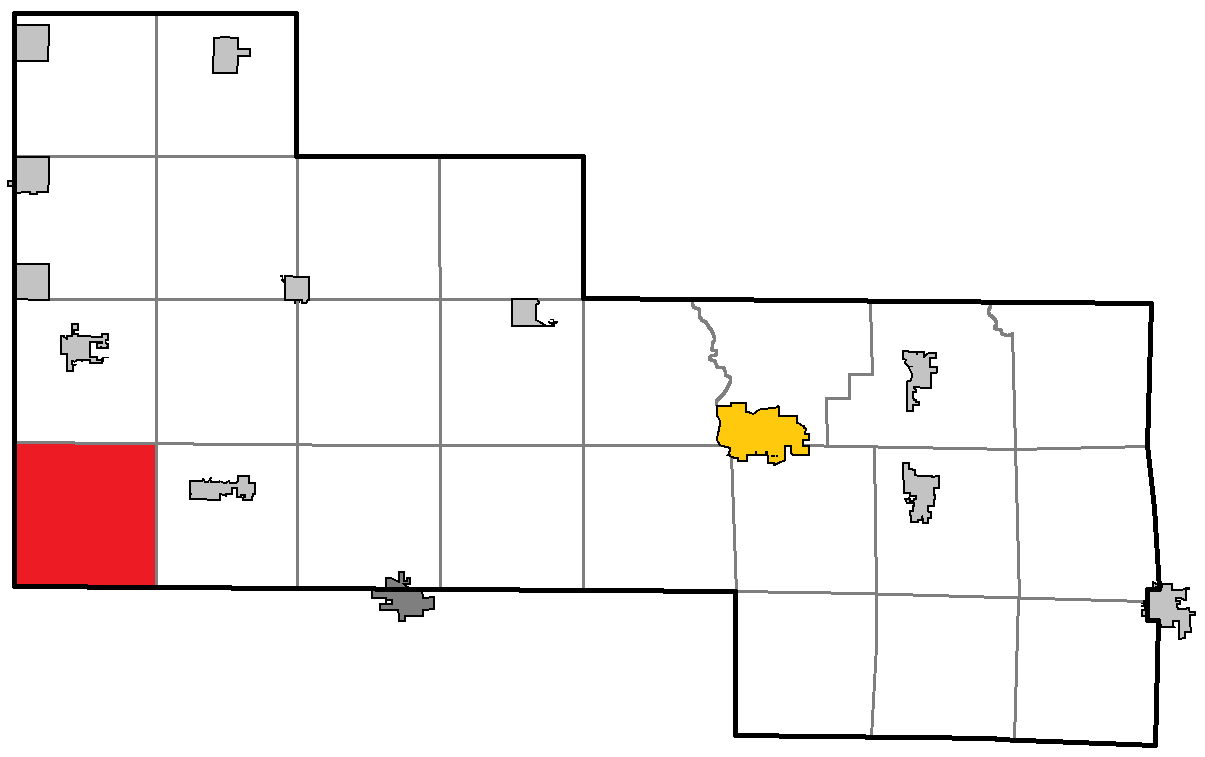
- Location of Germania, within Shawano County
- Coordinates: 44°43′25″N 89°9′50″W
- Country: United States
- State: Wisconsin
- County: Shawano

Area
  - Total: 36.2 sq mi (93.7 km^{2})
  - Land: 36.2 sq mi (93.7 km^{2})
  - Water: 0 sq mi (0.0 km^{2})
- Elevation: 1,076 ft (328 m)

Population (2020)
  - Total: 343
  - Density: 9.48/sq mi (3.66/km^{2})
- Time zone: UTC-6 (Central (CST))
  - Summer (DST): UTC-5 (CDT)
- FIPS code: 55-28825
- GNIS feature ID: 1583267

Germania is a town in Shawano County, Wisconsin, United States. The population was 343 at the 2020 census.

== Geography ==
According to the United States Census Bureau, the town has a total area of 36.2 square miles (93.7 km^{2}), all land.

== Demographics ==
At the 2000 census there were 339 people, 134 households, and 101 families in the town. The population density was 9.4 people per square mile (3.6/km^{2}). There were 142 housing units at an average density of 3.9 per square mile (1.5/km^{2}). The racial makeup of the town was 97.05% White, 0.59% African American, 0.29% Native American, 0.88% Asian, and 1.18% from two or more races. Hispanic or Latino of any race were 0.29%.

Of the 134 households 26.9% had children under the age of 18 living with them, 63.4% were married couples living together, 6.0% had a female householder with no husband present, and 24.6% were non-families. 20.1% of households were one person and 9.0% were one person aged 65 or older. The average household size was 2.53 and the average family size was 2.94.

The age distribution was 21.2% under the age of 18, 5.6% from 18 to 24, 23.9% from 25 to 44, 32.7% from 45 to 64, and 16.5% 65 or older. The median age was 45 years. For every 100 females, there were 110.6 males. For every 100 females age 18 and over, there were 115.3 males.

The median household income was $38,542 and the median family income was $45,192. Males had a median income of $30,833 versus $25,000 for females. The per capita income for the town was $17,820. About 5.9% of families and 8.9% of the population were below the poverty line, including 6.5% of those under age 18 and 10.7% of those age 65 or over.
