= Hutchins, Wisconsin =

- Town
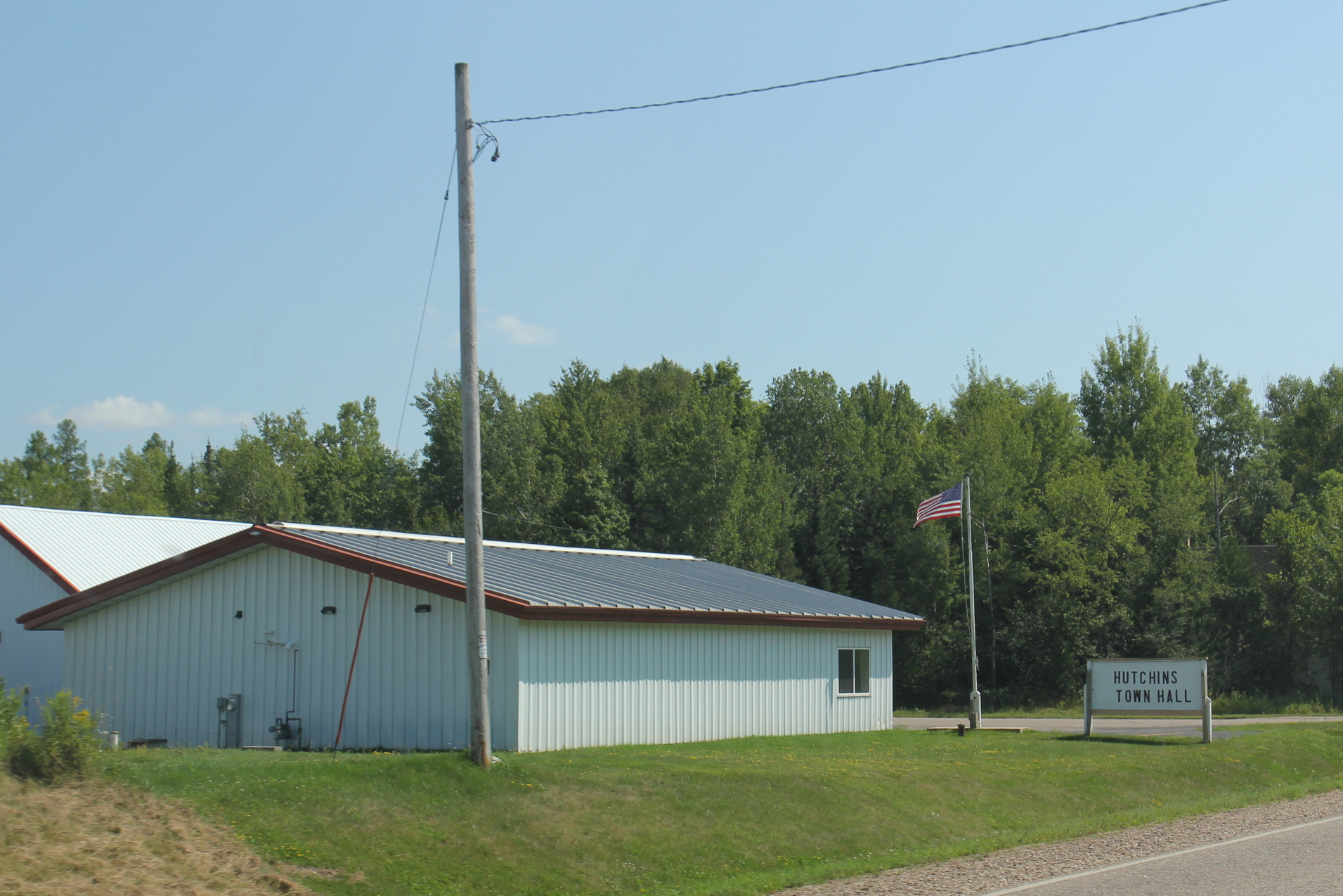
- town hall in 2015

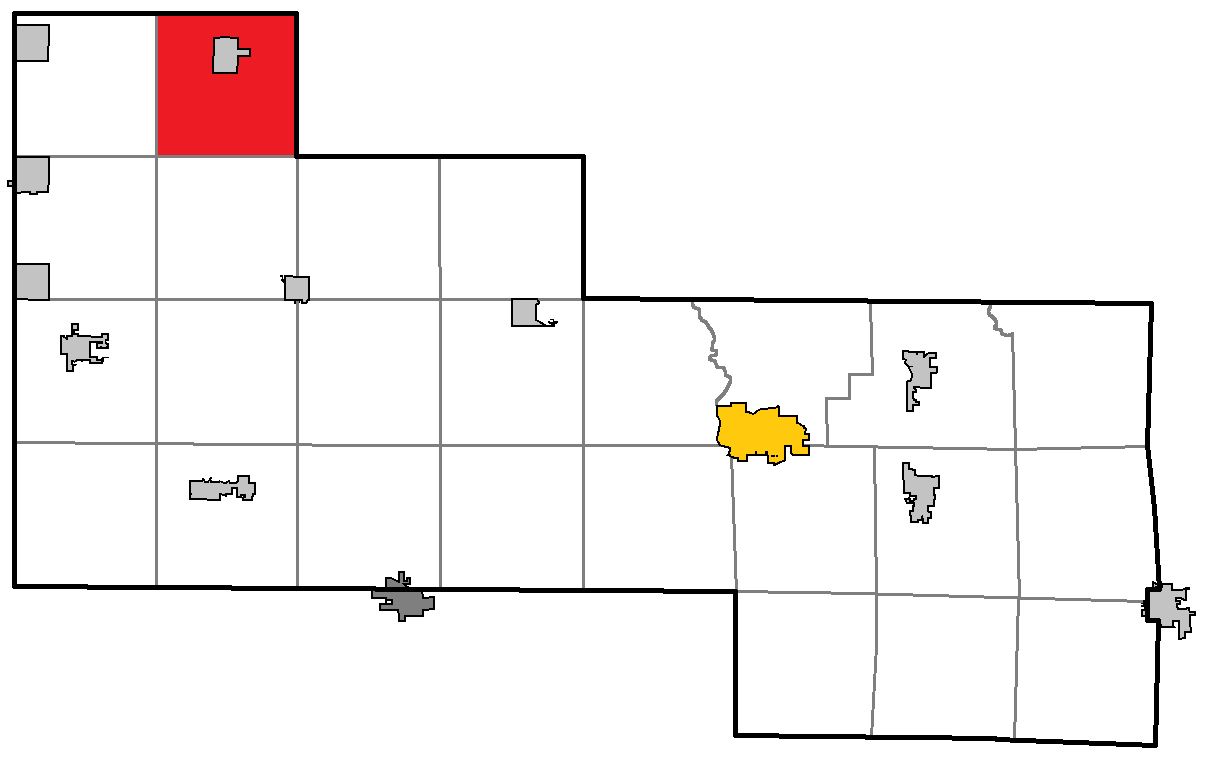
- Location of Hutchins, within Shawano County
- Coordinates: 44°58′18″N 89°3′10″W
- Country: United States
- State: Wisconsin
- County: Shawano

Area
  - Total: 33.6 sq mi (87.0 km^{2})
  - Land: 33.5 sq mi (86.7 km^{2})
  - Water: 0.12 sq mi (0.3 km^{2})
- Elevation: 1,253 ft (382 m)

Population (2020)
  - Total: 500
  - Density: 15/sq mi (5.8/km^{2})
- Time zone: UTC-6 (Central (CST))
  - Summer (DST): UTC-5 (CDT)
- FIPS code: 55-36700
- GNIS feature ID: 1583428

Hutchins is a town in Shawano County, Wisconsin, United States. The population was 500 at the 2020 census.

== Geography ==
According to the United States Census Bureau, the town has a total area of 33.6 square miles (87.0 km^{2}), of which 33.5 square miles (86.7 km^{2}) is land and 0.1 square mile (0.3 km^{2}) (0.30%) is water.

== Demographics ==
At the 2000 census there were 539 people, 195 households, and 158 families in the town. The population density was 16.1 people per square mile (6.2/km^{2}). There were 219 housing units at an average density of 6.5 per square mile (2.5/km^{2}). The racial makeup of the town was 97.40% White, 1.86% Native American, and 0.74% from two or more races. Hispanic or Latino of any race were 0.19%.

Of the 195 households 38.5% had children under the age of 18 living with them, 68.7% were married couples living together, 5.6% had a female householder with no husband present, and 18.5% were non-families. 15.9% of households were one person and 4.6% were one person aged 65 or older. The average household size was 2.76 and the average family size was 3.07.

The age distribution was 28.0% under the age of 18, 7.8% from 18 to 24, 30.1% from 25 to 44, 22.6% from 45 to 64, and 11.5% 65 or older. The median age was 36 years. For every 100 females, there were 100.4 males. For every 100 females age 18 and over, there were 103.1 males.

The median household income was $35,682 and the median family income was $41,875. Males had a median income of $31,250 versus $17,250 for females. The per capita income for the town was $16,404. About 3.8% of families and 6.0% of the population were below the poverty line, including 2.7% of those under age 18 and 13.6% of those age 65 or over.
