= How, Wisconsin =

- Town
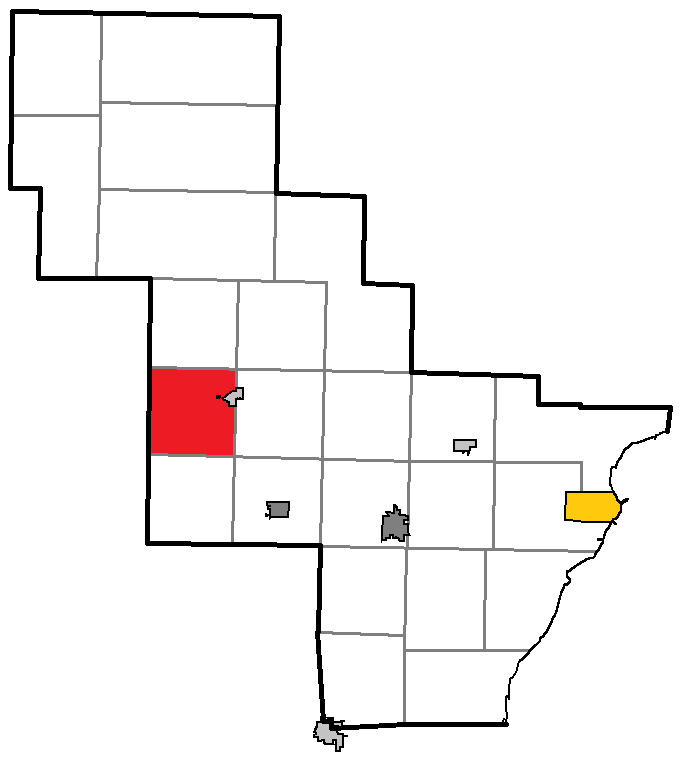
- Location of How, within Oconto County
- Coordinates: 44°59′58″N 88°25′38″W
- Country: United States
- State: Wisconsin
- County: Oconto

Area
  - Total: 35.1 sq mi (90.8 km^{2})
  - Land: 34.9 sq mi (90.5 km^{2})
  - Water: 0.12 sq mi (0.3 km^{2})
- Elevation: 840 ft (256 m)

Population (2020)
  - Total: 527
  - Density: 15.1/sq mi (5.82/km^{2})
- Time zone: UTC-6 (Central (CST))
  - Summer (DST): UTC-5 (CDT)
- FIPS code: 55-35925
- GNIS feature ID: 1582284
- Website: https://townofhow.com/

How is a town in Oconto County, Wisconsin, United States. The population was 527 at the 2020 census.

== History ==
How was established in 1875. How was divided from the city of Shawano in 1872, and became a town in Oconto County in 1878. A post office operated from 1879 to 1905. The town of How was named for Calvin F. How, Jr., an insurance and banking executive.

== Geography ==
According to the United States Census Bureau, the town has a total area of 35.1 square miles (90.8 km^{2}), of which 34.9 square miles (90.5 km^{2}) is land and 0.1 square mile (0.3 km^{2}) (0.34%) is water.

=== Communities ===
The unincorporated community of Hayes is located in the town. Hayes was named after Hayes Creek, which runs west of the town. The creek was named after an early logger. The now mostly abandoned settlement prospered in the 1890s, with two hotels, multiple saloons, a general store, barber shop, and photography studio. The immediate location now comprises only a few houses and storefronts from the 1900s.

== Demographics ==
As of the census of 2000, there were 563 people, 207 households, and 152 families residing in the town. The population density was 16.1 people per square mile (6.2/km^{2}). There were 229 housing units at an average density of 6.6 per square mile (2.5/km^{2}). The racial makeup of the town was 94.85% White, 4.44% Native American, and 0.71% from two or more races. Hispanic or Latino of any race were 1.07% of the population.

There were 207 households, out of which 32.4% had children under the age of 18 living with them, 68.6% were married couples living together, 2.9% had a female householder with no husband present, and 26.1% were non-families. 22.2% of all households were made up of individuals, and 9.2% had someone living alone who was 65 years of age or older. The average household size was 2.72 and the average family size was 3.24.

In the town, the population was spread out, with 28.4% under the age of 18, 6.2% from 18 to 24, 27.5% from 25 to 44, 24.7% from 45 to 64, and 13.1% who were 65 years of age or older. The median age was 39 years. For every 100 females, there were 114.1 males. For every 100 females age 18 and over, there were 111.0 males.

The median income for a household in the town was $39,167, and the median income for a family was $44,125. Males had a median income of $28,393 versus $20,521 for females. The per capita income for the town was $15,447. About 3.8% of families and 7.7% of the population were below the poverty line, including 13.2% of those under age 18 and 6.8% of those age 65 or over.
