= Wisconsin Highway 160 =

State highway in Wisconsin, United States

State Trunk Highway 160
- Polish Veterans Memorial Highway
- WIS 160 highlighted in red

Route information
- Maintained by WisDOT
- Length: 3.44 mi (5.54 km)

Major junctions
- West end: WIS 29 / WIS 55 in Angelica
- East end: WIS 32 in Pulaski

Location
- Country: United States
- State: Wisconsin
- Counties: Shawano, Brown

Highway system
- Wisconsin State Trunk Highway System; Interstate; US; State; Scenic; Rustic
← WIS 159	→ WIS 161

State Trunk Highway 160 (often called Highway 160, STH-160 or WIS 160) is a state highway in the US state of Wisconsin. It runs in east–west in east-central Wisconsin from Angelica to Pulaski.

== Route description ==
Starting at WIS 29/WIS 55 junction in Angelica, WIS 160 travels eastward. After under 3.5 miles (5.6 km), WIS 160 ends at WIS 32 in Pulaski.

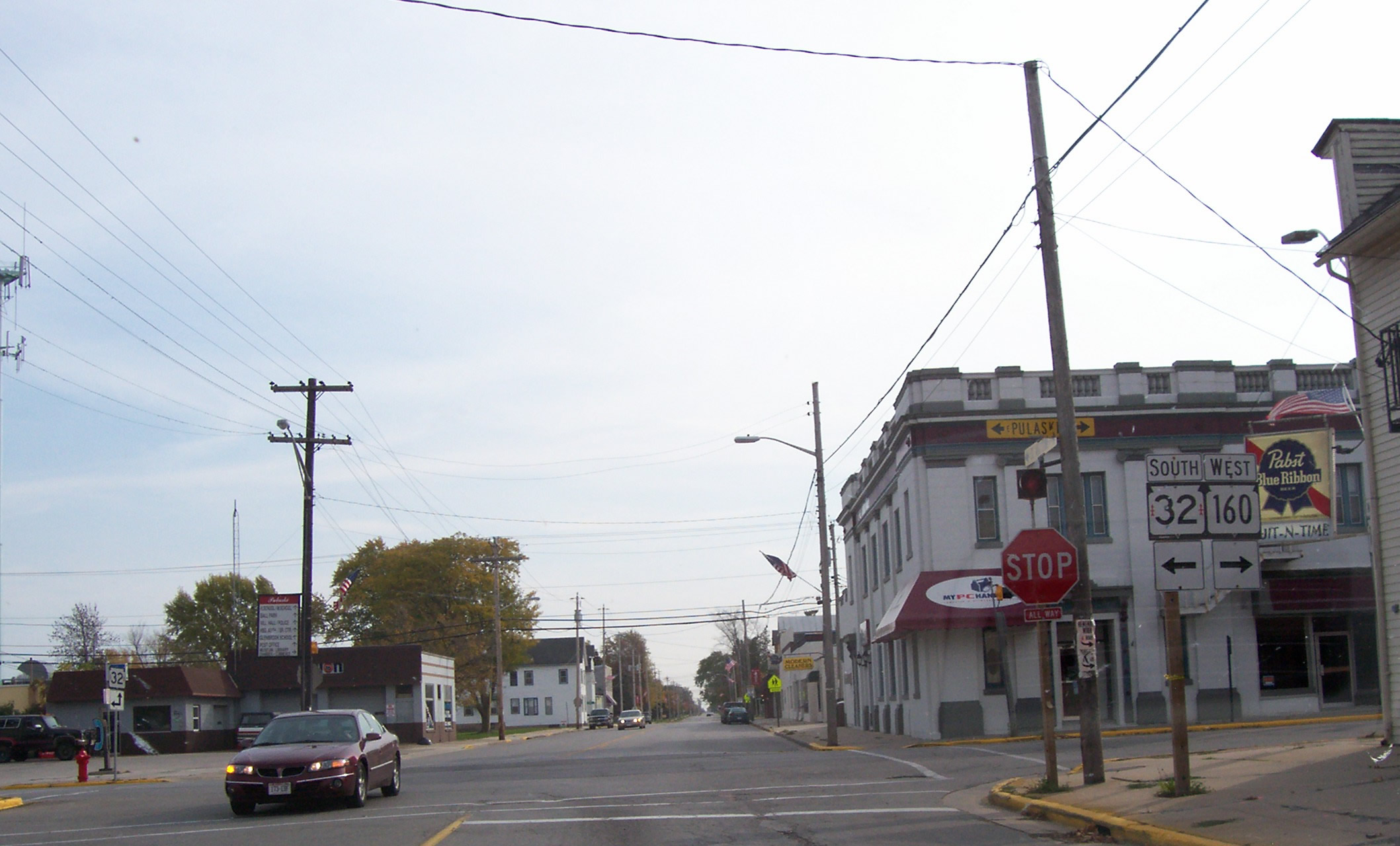
Eastern terminus

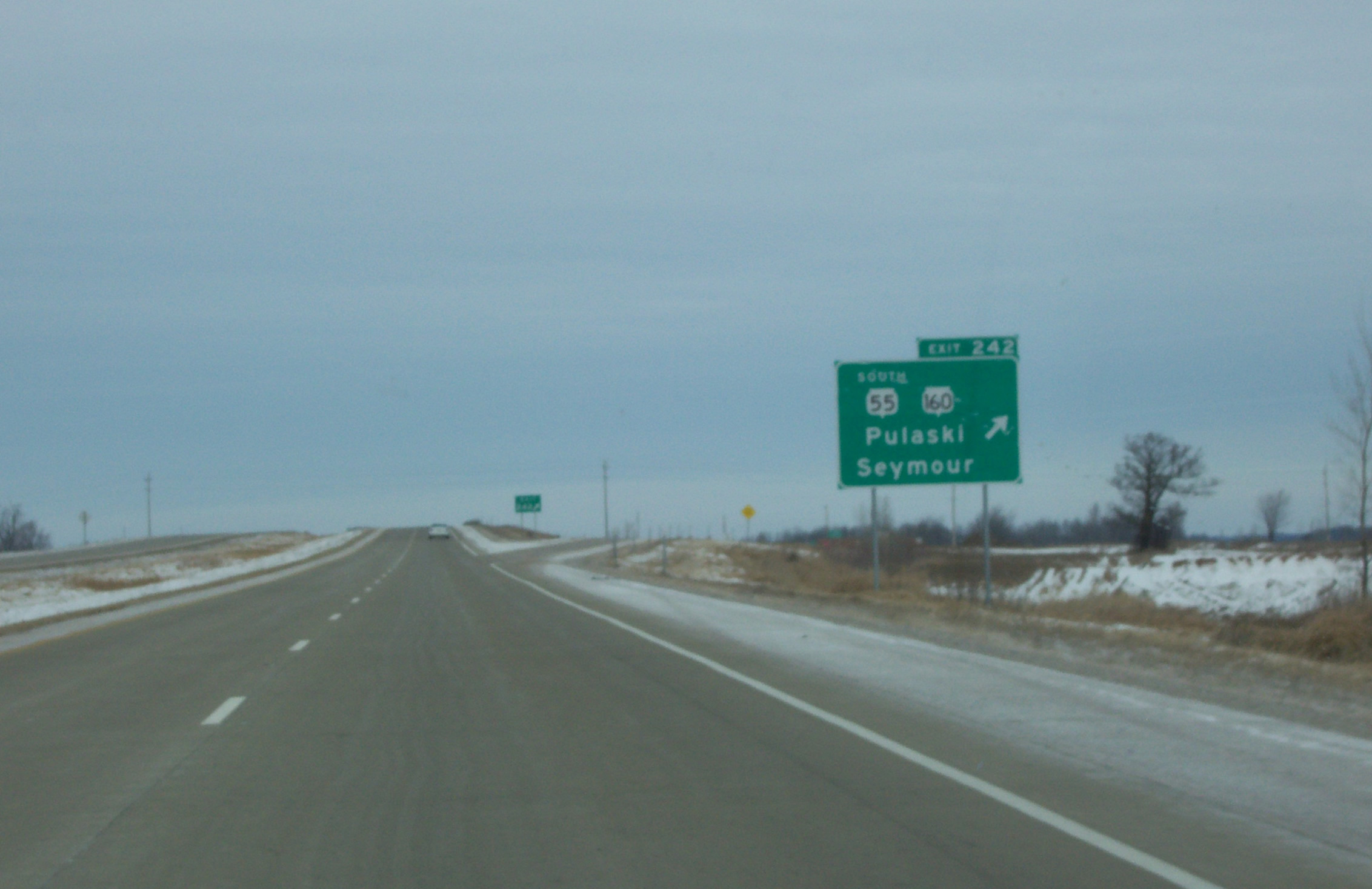
West terminus from WIS 29

== History ==
Initially, in 1923, WIS 160 was established to bypass WIS 16 from Mill Center to Angelica through downtown Pulaski. In 1930, four years after WIS 16 was renumbered WIS 29, both WIS 29 and WIS 160 switched places. However, WIS 160 ended up traveling from WIS 29 in Angelica to WIS 32 in Pulaski. In 1996, the route was slightly truncated in favor of the WIS 29 expressway.

== Major intersections ==
County	Location	mi	km	Destinations	Notes
Shawano	Community of Angelica	0.00	0.00	WIS 29 / WIS 55 north – Shawano, Green Bay WIS 55 south – Seymour	Roadway continues as WIS 55
Brown	Pulaski	3.44	5.54	WIS 32 – Green Bay, Gillett	Roadway continues as southbound WIS 32
1.000 mi = 1.609 km; 1.000 km = 0.621 mi
