= Zachow, Wisconsin =

- Unincorporated community
- Location within Wisconsin Location within the United States
- Coordinates: 44°43′56″N 88°21′49″W
- Country: United States
- State: Wisconsin
- County: Shawano
- Elevation: 860 ft (260 m)
- Time zone: UTC-6 (Central (CST))
  - Summer (DST): UTC-5 (CDT)
- ZIP code: 54182
- Area codes: 715 & 534
- GNIS feature ID: 1577121

Zachow is an unincorporated community located in Shawano County, Wisconsin, United States. Zachow is east of Bonduel, in the towns of Angelica, and Hartland. Although it is unincorporated, Zachow has been assigned the ZIP code 54182.

== History ==
A post office called Zachow was established in 1907, and remained in operation until it was discontinued in 1990. The community was named for William C. Zachow, a local landowner.
