= Landstad, Wisconsin =

- Unincorporated community
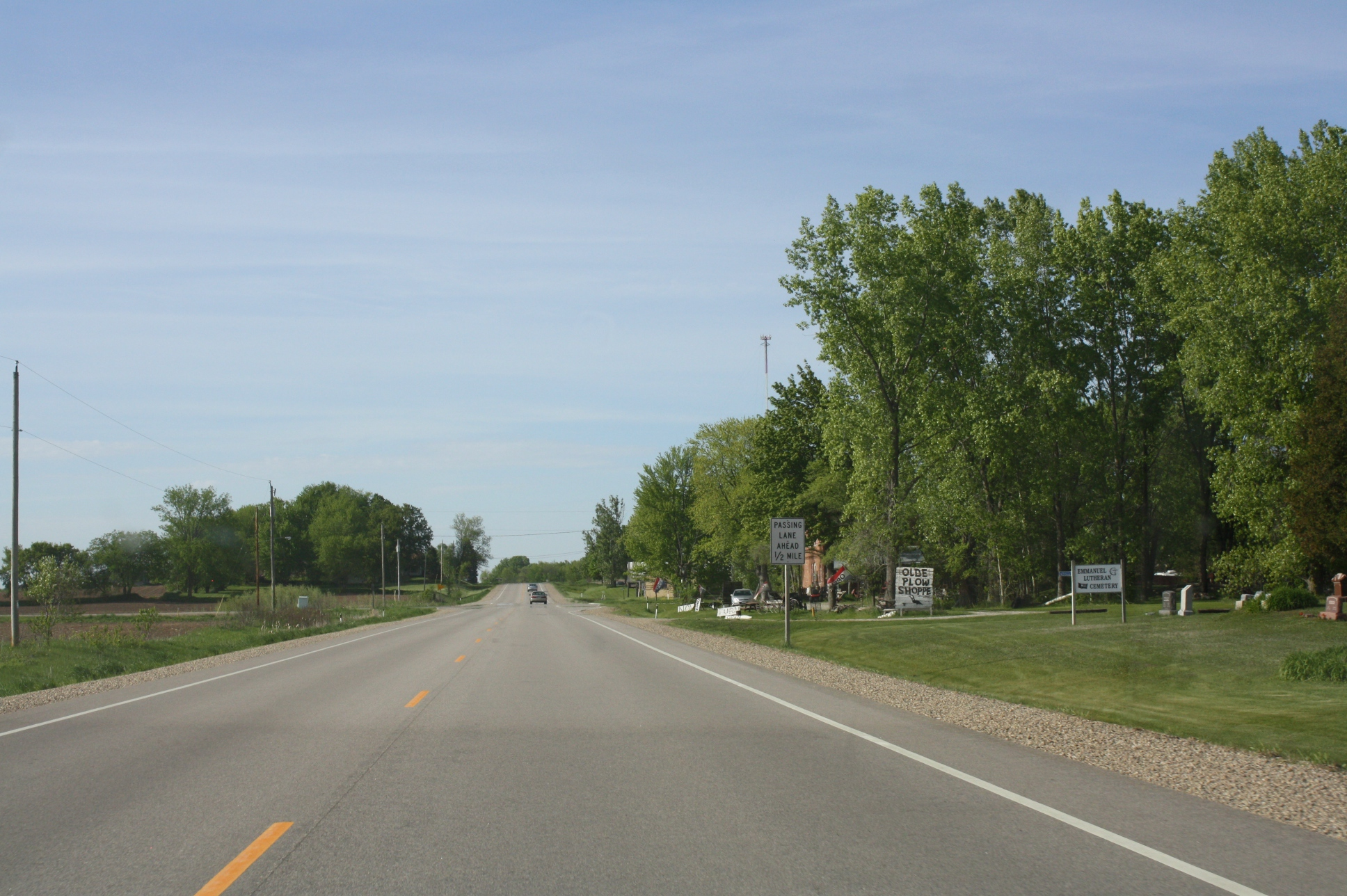
- Looking north in downtown Landstad

- Location within Wisconsin Location within the United States
- Coordinates: 44°39′38″N 88°26′37″W
- Country: United States
- State: Wisconsin
- County: Shawano
- Elevation: 840 ft (260 m)
- Time zone: UTC-6 (Central (CST))
  - Summer (DST): UTC-5 (CDT)
- Area codes: 715 & 534
- GNIS feature ID: 1567827

Landstad is an unincorporated community located in the town of Lessor, Shawano County, Wisconsin, United States. Landstad is located on Wisconsin Highway 47, 5.5 miles (8.9 km) south of Bonduel. The Landstad post office was established by its first postmaster, Sven G. Morgan, in June 1882 and discontinued in 1902. The community was likely named for Magnus Brostrup Landstad, a popular poet and hymnal writer at the time.

== Images ==
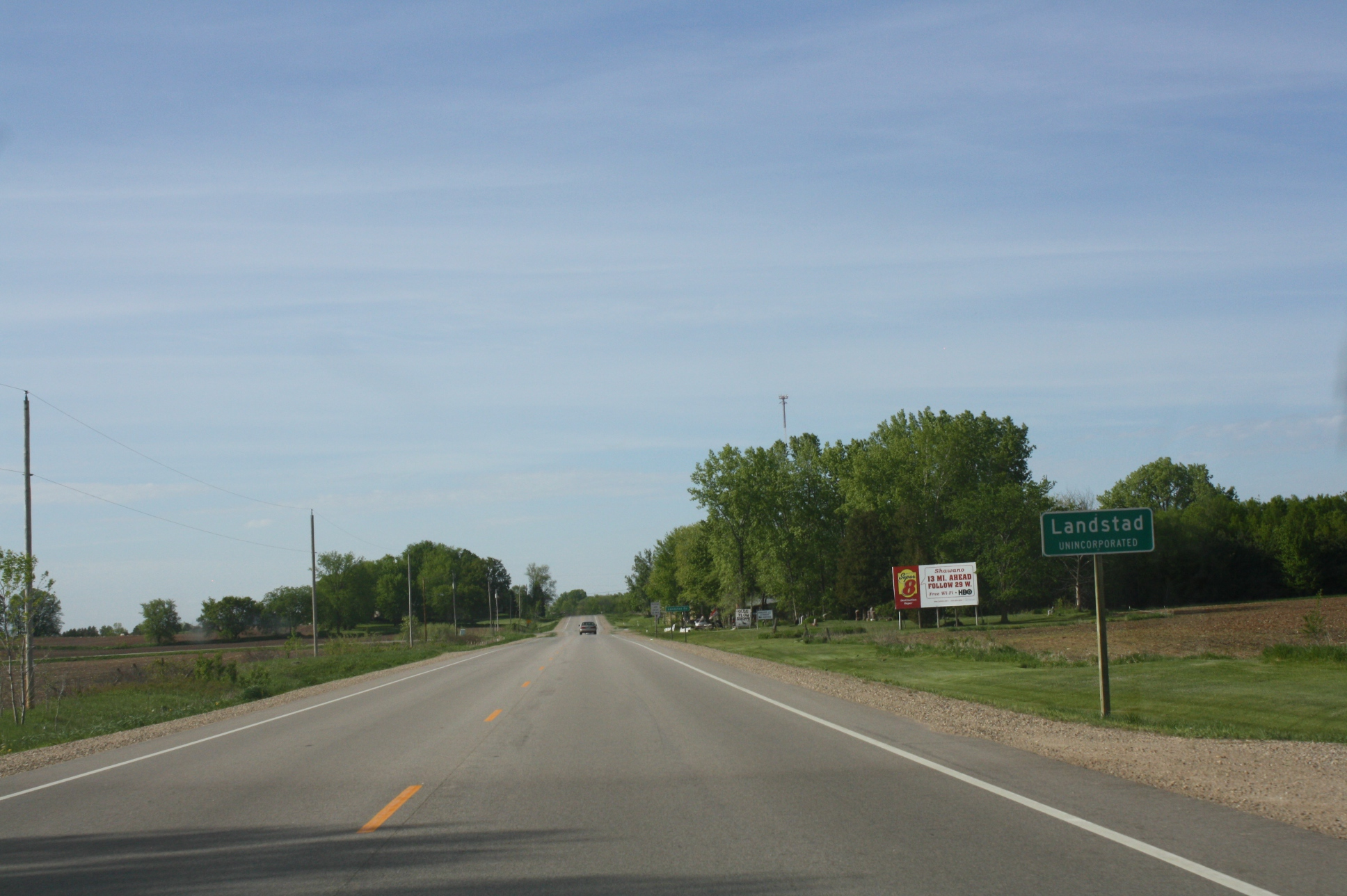
Sign for Landstad on WIS 47

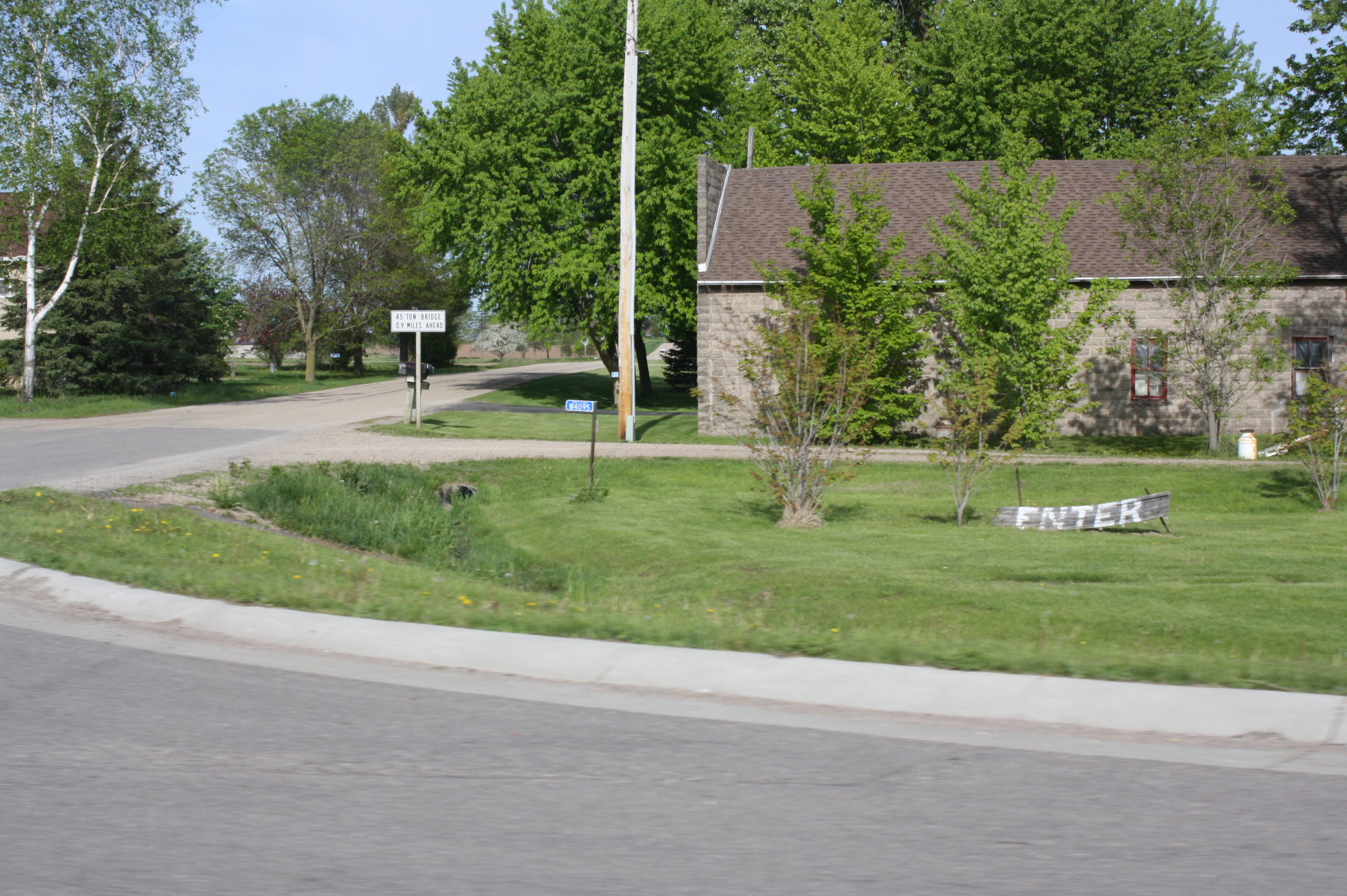
Looking east in Landstad
