= Pittsfield Township =

Pittsfield Township may refer to the following places in the United States:

- Pittsfield Township, Pike County, Illinois
- Pittsfield Charter Township, Michigan
- Pittsfield Township, Lorain County, Ohio
- Pittsfield Township, Pennsylvania

== See also ==
- Pittsfield (disambiguation)
