= Laney, Wisconsin =

- Unincorporated community
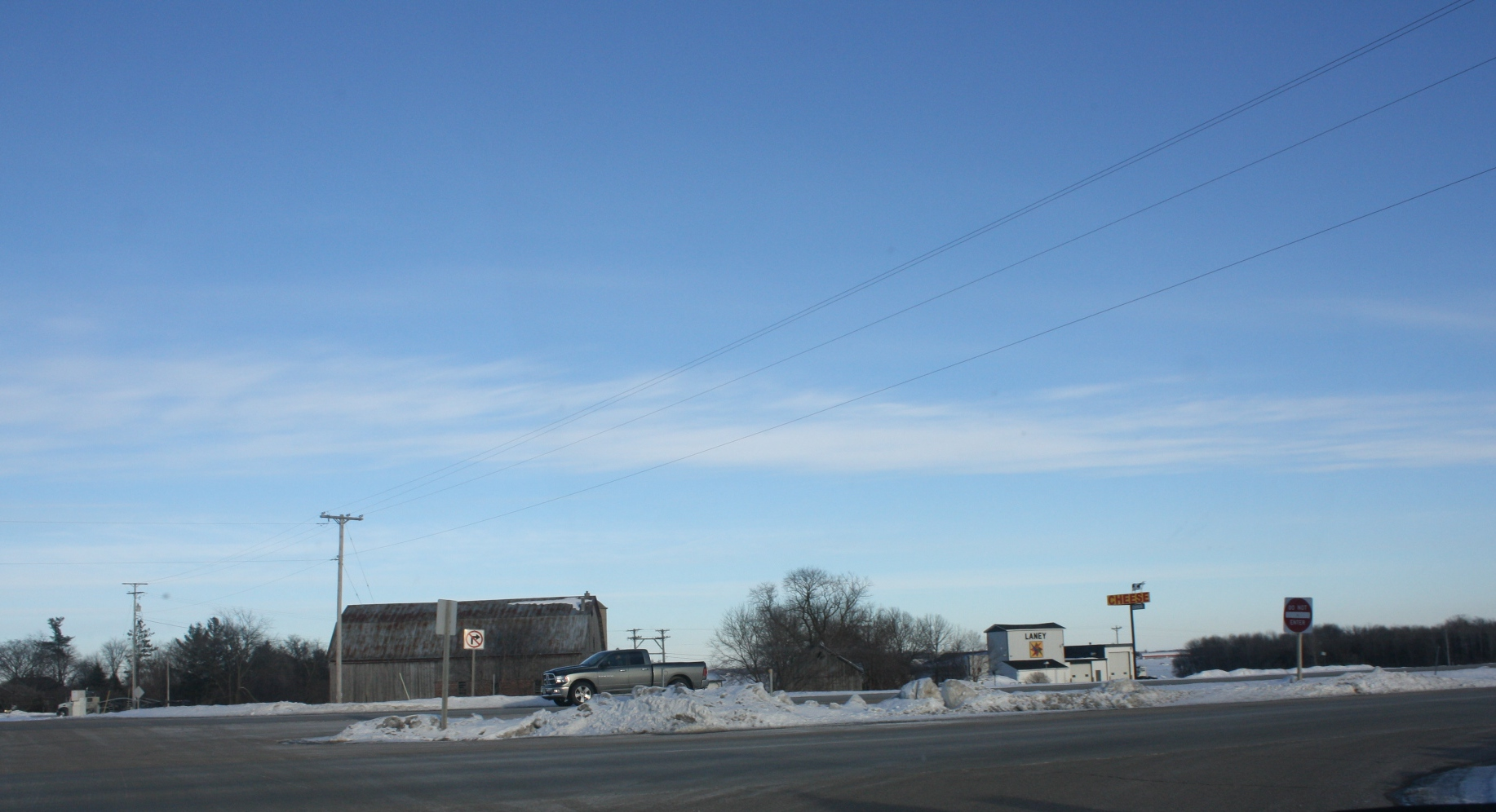
- Looking north at Laney across Wisconsin Highway 29

- Location within Wisconsin Location within the United States
- Coordinates: 44°38′40″N 88°17′21″W
- Country: United States
- State: Wisconsin
- County: Shawano
- Elevation: 869 ft (265 m)
- Time zone: UTC-6 (Central (CST))
  - Summer (DST): UTC-5 (CDT)
- Area code: 920
- GNIS feature ID: 1567833

Laney is an unincorporated community located in the town of Maple Grove, Shawano County, Wisconsin, United States. Laney is located near Wisconsin Highway 29, 3 miles (4.8 km) southwest of Pulaski. The Laney School is listed on the National Register of Historic Places.
