= Krakow, Wisconsin =

Census-designated place in Wisconsin, United States

- Census-designated place
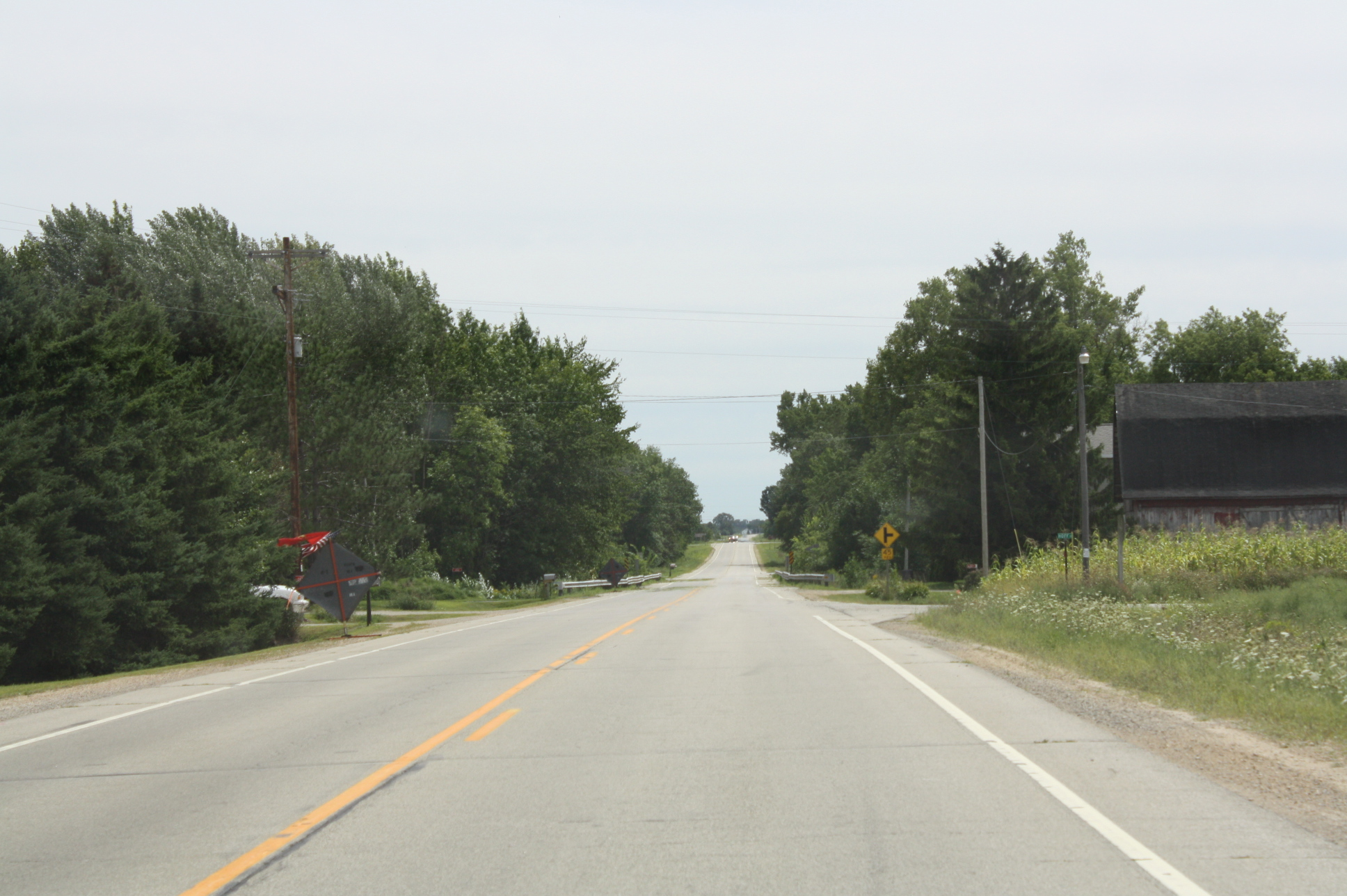
- Downtown Krakow

- Location within Wisconsin
- Coordinates: 44°45′42″N 88°15′05″W
- Country: United States
- State: Wisconsin
- Counties: Oconto and Shawano

Area
  - Total: 1.128 sq mi (2.92 km^{2})
  - Land: 1.128 sq mi (2.92 km^{2})
  - Water: 0 sq mi (0 km^{2})
- Elevation: 778 ft (237 m)

Population (2020)
  - Total: 378
  - Density: 335/sq mi (129/km^{2})
- Time zone: UTC-6 (Central (CST))
  - Summer (DST): UTC-5 (CDT)
- ZIP code: 54137
- Area code: 920
- GNIS feature ID: 1565712

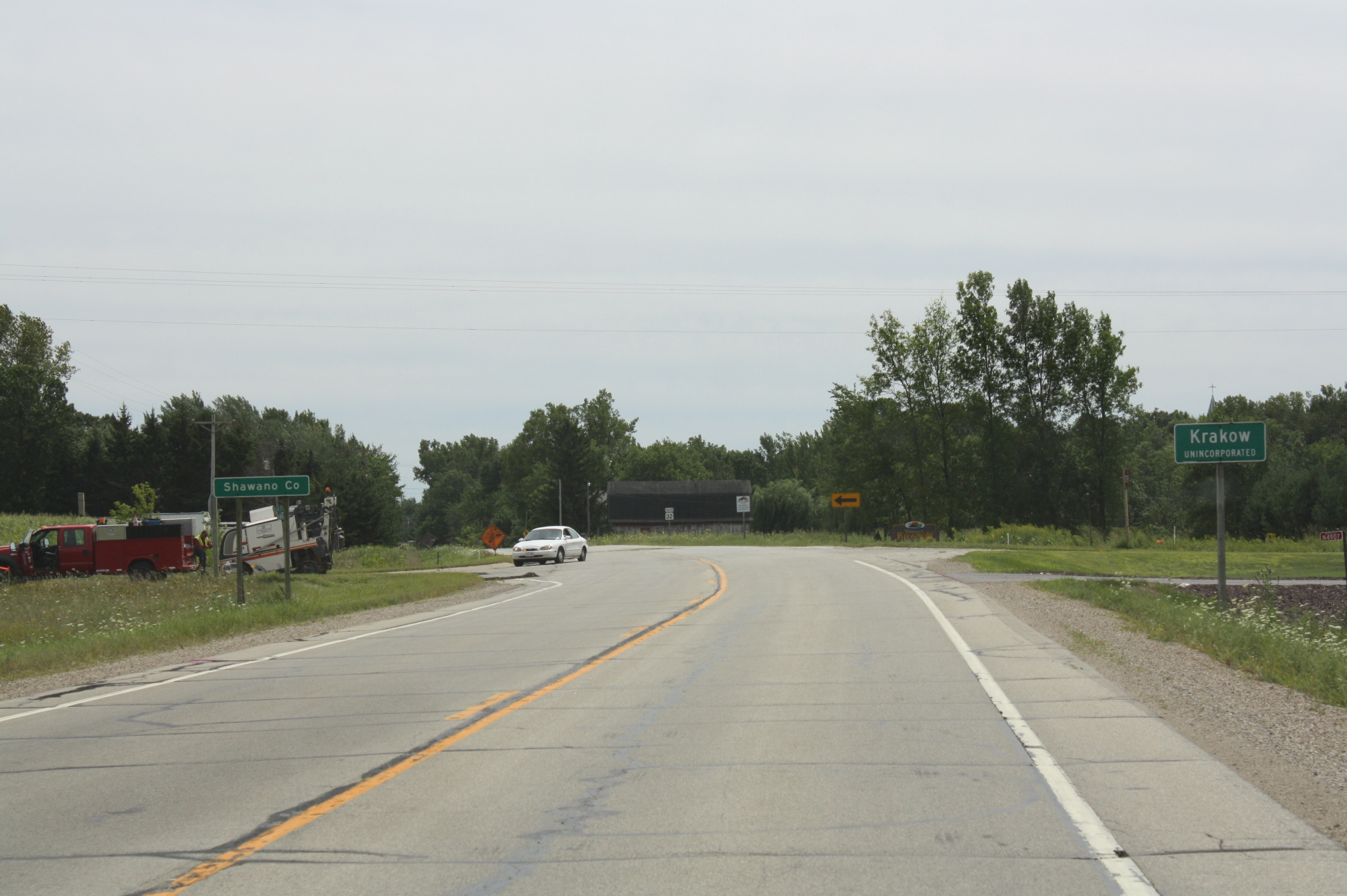
Sign along WIS 32

Krakow is an unincorporated community and census-designated place located primarily in Shawano County, Wisconsin, United States, with a small portion in Oconto County. Krakow is located on Wisconsin Highway 32 north of Pulaski, in the towns of Chase, and Angelica. Krakow has a post office with ZIP code 54137. As of the 2020 census, its population is 378.

Krakow has a Catholic church and a tavern. In its heyday, it had a grocery store, a cheese factory, a pickle canning company, movie theaters, a few taverns, a parochial school, and a public school.

== Demographics ==
Historical population
Census	Pop.	Note	%±
2010	354		—
2020	378		6.8%
U.S. Decennial Census
