= Lessor, Wisconsin =

- Town
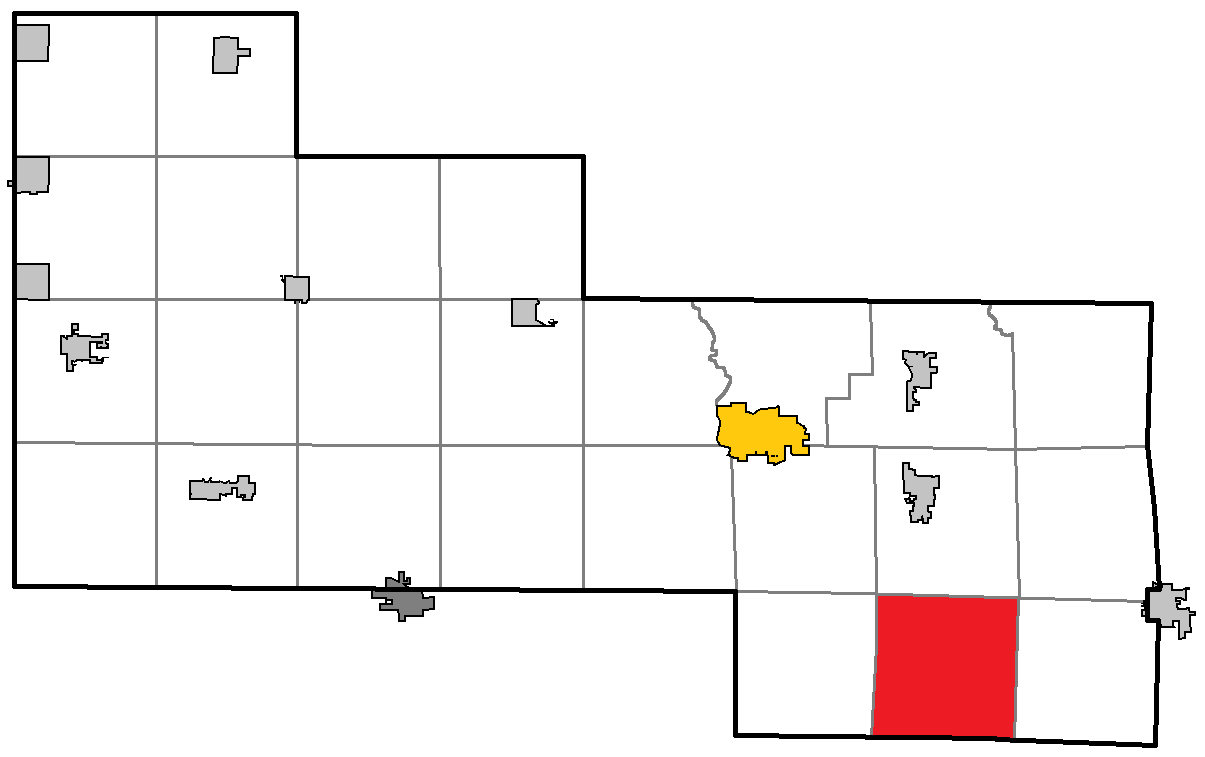
- Location of Lessor, within Shawano County
- Coordinates: 44°37′54″N 88°26′8″W
- Country: United States
- State: Wisconsin
- County: Shawano

Area
  - Total: 36.1 sq mi (93.6 km^{2})
  - Land: 35.9 sq mi (93.0 km^{2})
  - Water: 0.23 sq mi (0.6 km^{2})
- Elevation: 804 ft (245 m)

Population (2020)
  - Total: 1,226
  - Density: 34.1/sq mi (13.2/km^{2})
- Time zone: UTC-6 (Central (CST))
  - Summer (DST): UTC-5 (CDT)
- FIPS code: 55-43675
- GNIS feature ID: 1583547
- Website: http://townoflessor.com/

Lessor is a town in Shawano County, Wisconsin, United States. The population was 1,226 at the 2020 census. The unincorporated communities of Briarton and Landstad are located in the town. The unincorporated community of Frazer Corners is also partially located in the town.

== Geography ==
According to the United States Census Bureau, the town has a total area of 36.1 square miles (93.6 km^{2}), of which 35.9 square miles (93.0 km^{2}) is land and 0.2 square mile (0.6 km^{2}) (0.61%) is water.

== Demographics ==
As of the census of 2000, there were 1,112 people, 378 households, and 298 families residing in the town. The population density was 31.0 people per square mile (12.0/km^{2}). There were 401 housing units at an average density of 11.2 per square mile (4.3/km^{2}). The racial makeup of the town was 98.83% White, 0.72% Native American, 0.09% Asian, and 0.36% from two or more races. Hispanic or Latino of any race were 0.36% of the population.

There were 378 households, out of which 41.8% had children under the age of 18 living with them, 70.4% were married couples living together, 4.8% had a female householder with no husband present, and 20.9% were non-families. 16.1% of all households were made up of individuals, and 6.6% had someone living alone who was 65 years of age or older. The average household size was 2.94 and the average family size was 3.33.

In the town, the population was spread out, with 30.8% under the age of 18, 7.2% from 18 to 24, 34.3% from 25 to 44, 18.4% from 45 to 64, and 9.4% who were 65 years of age or older. The median age was 33 years. For every 100 females, there were 108.6 males. For every 100 females age 18 and over, there were 113.9 males.

The median income for a household in the town was $47,969, and the median income for a family was $49,567. Males had a median income of $31,758 versus $21,750 for females. The per capita income for the town was $18,024. About 7.2% of families and 9.0% of the population were below the poverty line, including 13.6% of those under age 18 and 4.2% of those age 65 or over.
