= Frazer Corners, Wisconsin =

- Unincorporated community
- Location within Wisconsin Location within the United States
- Coordinates: 44°40′28″N 88°21′44″W
- Country: United States
- State: Wisconsin
- County: Shawano
- Elevation: 951 ft (290 m)
- Time zone: UTC-6 (Central (CST))
  - Summer (DST): UTC-5 (CDT)
- Area codes: 715 & 534
- GNIS feature ID: 1565281

Frazer Corners is an unincorporated community in Shawano County, Wisconsin, United States. Frazer Corners is partly located in the towns of Angelica, Hartland, Lessor, and Maple Grove. It is located 6 miles (9.7 km) west of Pulaski at the junction of county highways F and S. The community was named for George H. Frazer, an early settler and the first chairman of the town of Lessor, Wisconsin. A post office was established in Frazer Corners in December 1881 with Peter E. Blitchfeldt as the first postmaster.
