= Hofa Park, Wisconsin =

- Unincorporated community
- Location within Wisconsin Location within the United States
- Coordinates: 44°37′49″N 88°19′58″W
- Country: United States
- State: Wisconsin
- County: Shawano
- Elevation: 906 ft (276 m)
- Time zone: UTC-6 (Central (CST))
  - Summer (DST): UTC-5 (CDT)
- Area codes: 715 & 534
- GNIS feature ID: 1566508

Hofa Park is an unincorporated community located in the town of Maple Grove, Shawano County, Wisconsin, United States. Hofa Park is 5.5 miles (8.9 km) west-southwest of Pulaski. The community was named for John J. Hof, an owner of a land company in the 1880s.
