= Maple Grove, Shawano County, Wisconsin =

Maple Grove, Wisconsin
- Town
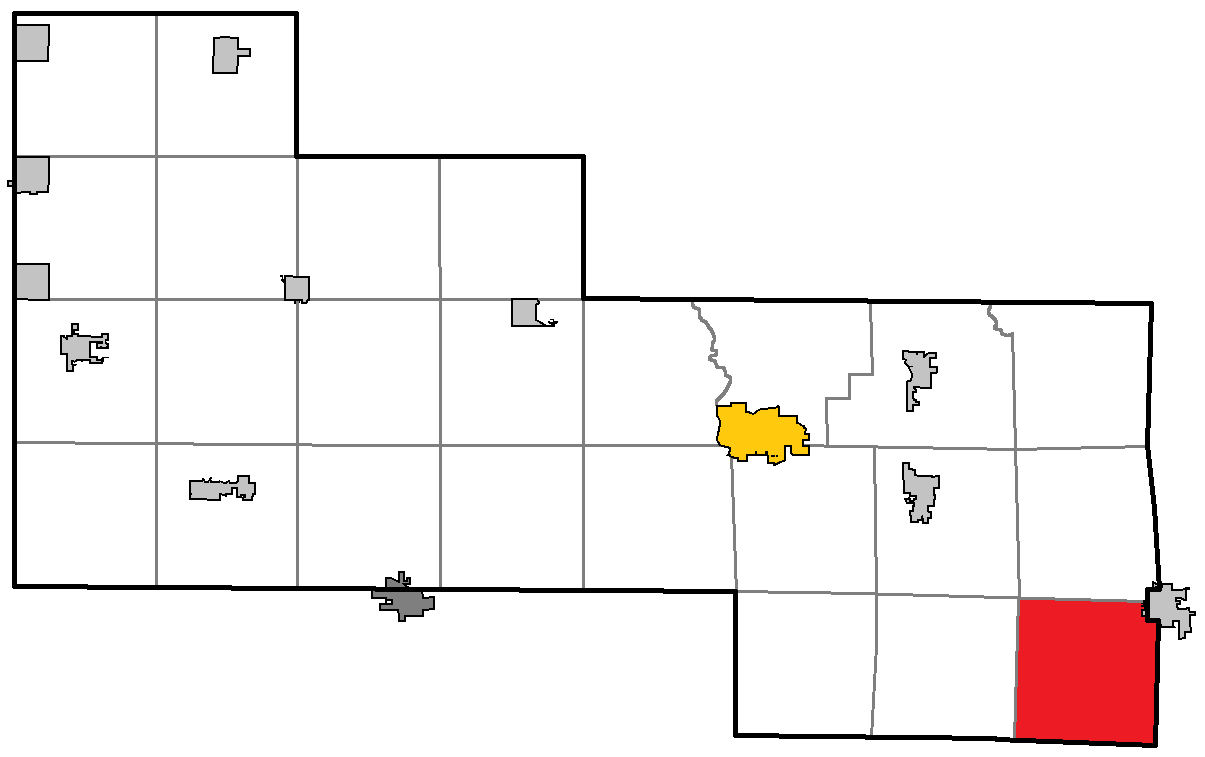
- Location of Maple Grove, within Shawano County, Wisconsin
- Coordinates: 44°36′45″N 88°18′27″W
- Country: United States
- State: Wisconsin
- County: Shawano

Area
  - Total: 35.3 sq mi (91.5 km^{2})
  - Land: 35.3 sq mi (91.5 km^{2})
  - Water: 0 sq mi (0.0 km^{2})
- Elevation: 869 ft (265 m)

Population (2020)
  - Total: 939
  - Density: 26.6/sq mi (10.3/km^{2})
- Time zone: UTC-6 (Central (CST))
  - Summer (DST): UTC-5 (CDT)
- FIPS code: 55-48900
- GNIS feature ID: 1583644

Maple Grove is a town in Shawano County, Wisconsin, United States. The population was 939 at the 2020 census. The unincorporated communities of Hofa Park, Laney, and Rose Lawn are located in the town. The unincorporated communities of Angelica, Frazer Corners, and Pittsfield are also located partially in the town.

== Geography ==
According to the United States Census Bureau, the town has a total area of 35.3 square miles (91.5 km^{2}), of which 35.3 square miles (91.5 km^{2}) is land and 0.03% is water.

== Demographics ==
As of the census of 2000, there were 1,045 people, 360 households, and 297 families residing in the town. The population density was 29.6 people per square mile (11.4/km^{2}). There were 372 housing units at an average density of 10.5 per square mile (4.1/km^{2}). The racial makeup of the town was 99.04% White, 0.29% Native American, 0.29% Asian, and 0.38% from two or more races. Hispanic or Latino of any race were 1.05% of the population.

There were 360 households, out of which 36.1% had children under the age of 18 living with them, 73.1% were married couples living together, 5.0% had a female householder with no husband present, and 17.5% were non-families. 13.6% of all households were made up of individuals, and 6.7% had someone living alone who was 65 years of age or older. The average household size was 2.90 and the average family size was 3.21.

In the town, the population was spread out, with 27.0% under the age of 18, 7.5% from 18 to 24, 29.9% from 25 to 44, 22.5% from 45 to 64, and 13.2% who were 65 years of age or older. The median age was 37 years. For every 100 females, there were 101.3 males. For every 100 females age 18 and over, there were 106.2 males.

The median income for a household in the town was $45,568, and the median income for a family was $52,625. Males had a median income of $31,944 versus $23,500 for females. The per capita income for the town was $16,818. About 3.2% of families and 5.5% of the population were below the poverty line, including 6.9% of those under age 18 and 2.7% of those age 65 or over.
