= Pittsfield (disambiguation) =

Pittsfield, Massachusetts is a city in the United States.

Pittsfield may also refer to the following places in the US:

== Settlements ==
- Pilot Hill, California, formerly Pittsfield
- Pittsfield, Illinois, a city
- Pittsfield, Maine, a town
  - Pittsfield (CDP), Maine, the main village in the town
- Pittsfield, New Hampshire, a town
  - Pittsfield (CDP), New Hampshire, the main village in the town
- Pittsfield, New York, a town
- Pittsfield, Vermont, a town
- Pittsfield, Wisconsin, a town
  - Pittsfield (community), Wisconsin, an unincorporated community in the town
- Pittsfield Township, Pike County, Illinois
- Pittsfield Charter Township, Michigan
  - Pittsfield, Michigan, a former settlement
- Pittsfield Township, Lorain County, Ohio
- Pittsfield Township, Pennsylvania

== Structures ==
- Pittsfield Building, a skyscraper in Chicago, Illinois
