= Shawano County, Wisconsin =

County in Wisconsin, United States

- County
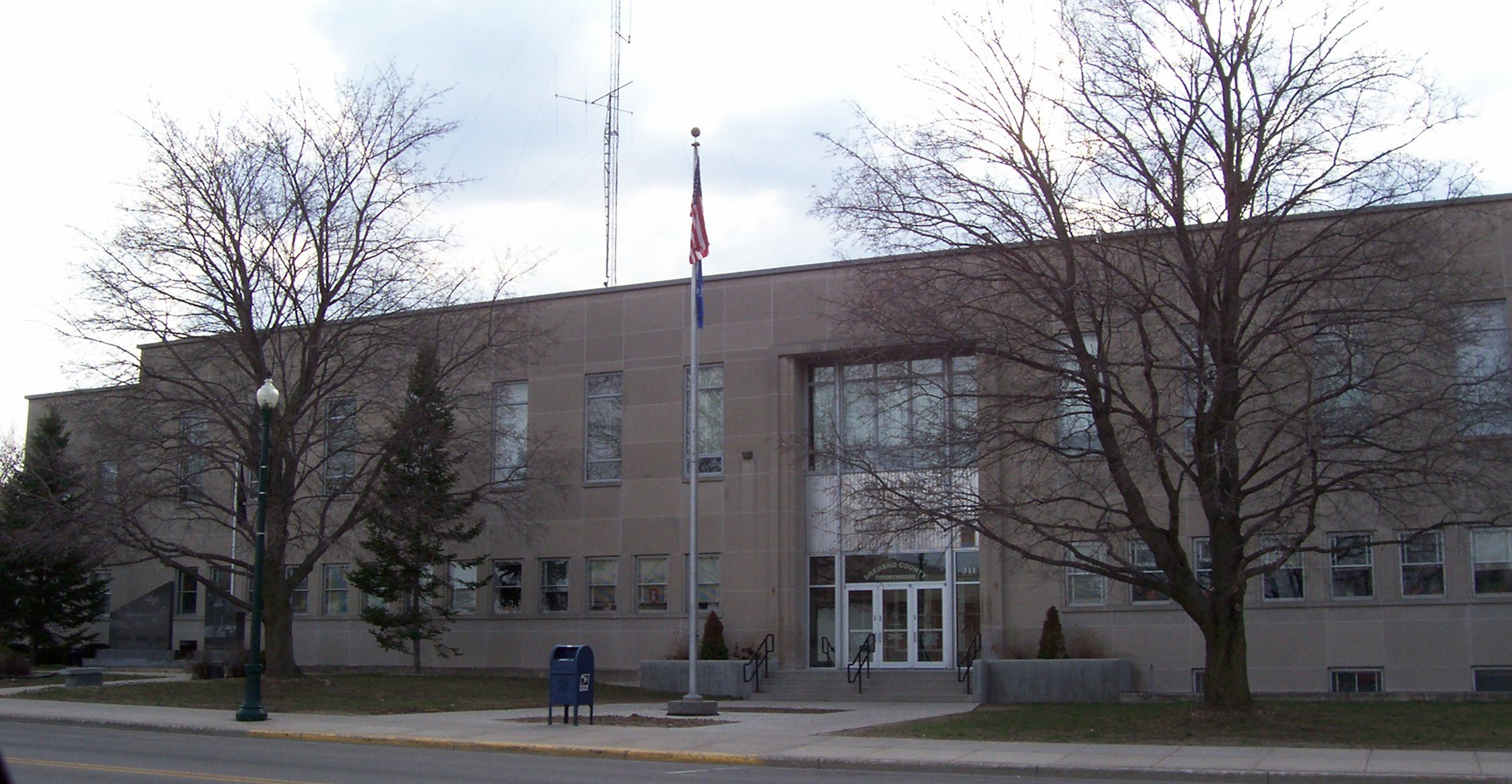
- Shawano County Courthouse, built mid-1950s

- Location within the U.S. state of Wisconsin
- Coordinates: 44°47′N 88°46′W
- Country: United States
- State: Wisconsin
- Founded: February 16, 1853
- Seat: Shawano
- Largest city: Shawano

Area
  - Total: 909 sq mi (2,350 km^{2})
  - Land: 893 sq mi (2,310 km^{2})
  - Water: 16 sq mi (41 km^{2}) 1.8%

Population (2020)
  - Total: 40,881
  - Estimate (2025): 41,560 ▲
  - Density: 45.8/sq mi (17.7/km^{2})
- Time zone: UTC−6 (Central)
  - Summer (DST): UTC−5 (CDT)
- Congressional district: 8th
- Website: www.co.shawano.wi.us

Shawano County (/ˈʃɔːnoʊ/ SHAW-noh; originally Shawanaw County) is a county located in the U.S. state of Wisconsin. As of the 2020 census, the population was 40,881. Its county seat is Shawano.

Shawano County is included in the Shawano, WI Micropolitan Statistical Area, which is also included in the Green Bay–Shawano, WI Combined Statistical Area.

== History ==
Its name is from a modified Ojibwa term meaning "southern"; it was the southern boundary of the Ojibwa nation. A Menominee chief named Sawanoh led a band that lived in the area. Many citizens of Shawano believe the lake, county, and city (Town of Shawanaw founded 1853 and changed to Shawano in 1856), were named after Chief Sawanoh. A historical marker placed in 1958 near the lake along Highway 22 states the lake was named as the southern boundary of Chippewa (Ojibwe) territory.

Various historical recordings of the spelling of Shawano include Sawanoh, Shawanaw, Sharuno, Shabin, Savannah, and Savanah. This shows the influence of French, German, and English translation (v's, w's, and b's sounding very similar and thus being recorded incorrectly at times). Similar differences in spelling have been seen in the Mahican/Mahikan/Maikens tribe or Mohecan/Morhican/Mohican tribe, all referring to the same Algonquian-speaking people.

The federally recognized Stockbridge-Munsee Community (made up of Algonquian-speaking Mahican and Lenape), whose ancestors traditionally lived in the East along the Hudson River Valley, is located in Shawano County. Their reservation encompasses the towns of Bartelme and Red Springs.

It was created as a separate county in 1853 under the name Shawanaw County. The county, unlike the city, retained the old spelling until 1864.

From the mid-nineteenth century on, the county was settled by European Americans, including many German, and later, Polish immigrants. They developed the county for agriculture. Before that, French-Canadian and British fur traders traveled widely through the area, trading with the Chippewa and other Native American peoples of the region.

The first non-Indian credited with exploring the region where Shawano is now located is Samuel Farnsworth. He paddled up the Wolf River in 1843 with a few men to scout the area for logging the vast forests. A small Menominee village was located along the Shawano lake Channel when their party arrived, and the Indians were friendly and cooperative. Charles Wescott and the Farnsworth group then set up a sawmill where the Channel meets the Wolf River. Check for 2 versions Stockbridge Munsee enrollment of 1871.

Captain Wells and an officer of the Black Hawk War, established a trading post on the Wolf River about two miles from the village in 1844. He had been an interpreter for the government when the treaties were signed allowing white people to settle this area of Wiskansin.

Philetus Sawyer and a tribe of lawyers platted a village near Wells trading post in 1854 but public favor clung to the region adjacent to the old mill property and it was decided by popular vote to locate the county seat at Shawanaw, which was the name of the newly formed county.

The county, which was organized in 1853, was formed from areas of Oconto and Outagamie Counties. Forty-seven votes were cast and Elias Murray, Charles D. Wescott and Elisha Alexander were elected supervisors. At that time, there were 254 registered inhabitants, but only the men were allowed to vote and lack of women due to a temporary logging agenda.

When the county was first organized, the name was spelled Shawnoe from a treaty involving the displacement of tribes including Miami, Delaware from Indiana. Sha-wa-Nah-Pay which meant “lake to the south” in Chippewa was likely lake Winnebago where the original Stockbridge-Munsee reservation was located and still exists holding true title by head Chief Austin Ekautuam Quinney.The spelling was changed in 1864 to its present Shawano, with three townships: Richmond, Waukechon and Shawano. Later, others were added, making 25 townships. Waukechon was originally its own county to the south but removed.

In 1860, the first school house was erected in the county and Orlin Andrews was employed as its teacher. In 1898 there were 108 public schools in the county with 124 teachers.

A courthouse was erected on Main Street in 1857 and was replaced in 1879–80 at a cost of $17,000.00. The County Board authorized a new courthouse and jail in June 1953.

The earliest settlers who came to Shawano County consisted mostly of people from the New England States, Canada, and a few from British Columbia. A large influx of Bohemians settled in the Leopolis area and near Powell's Trading Post in the area about two miles from the city on Highway K. Norwegians settled in the area around Wittenberg, Lessor, Lunds and Navarino. Germans have been very predominate in the entire county, with 4,524 of the 27,475 inhabitants in 1900 born in Germany.

== Geography ==
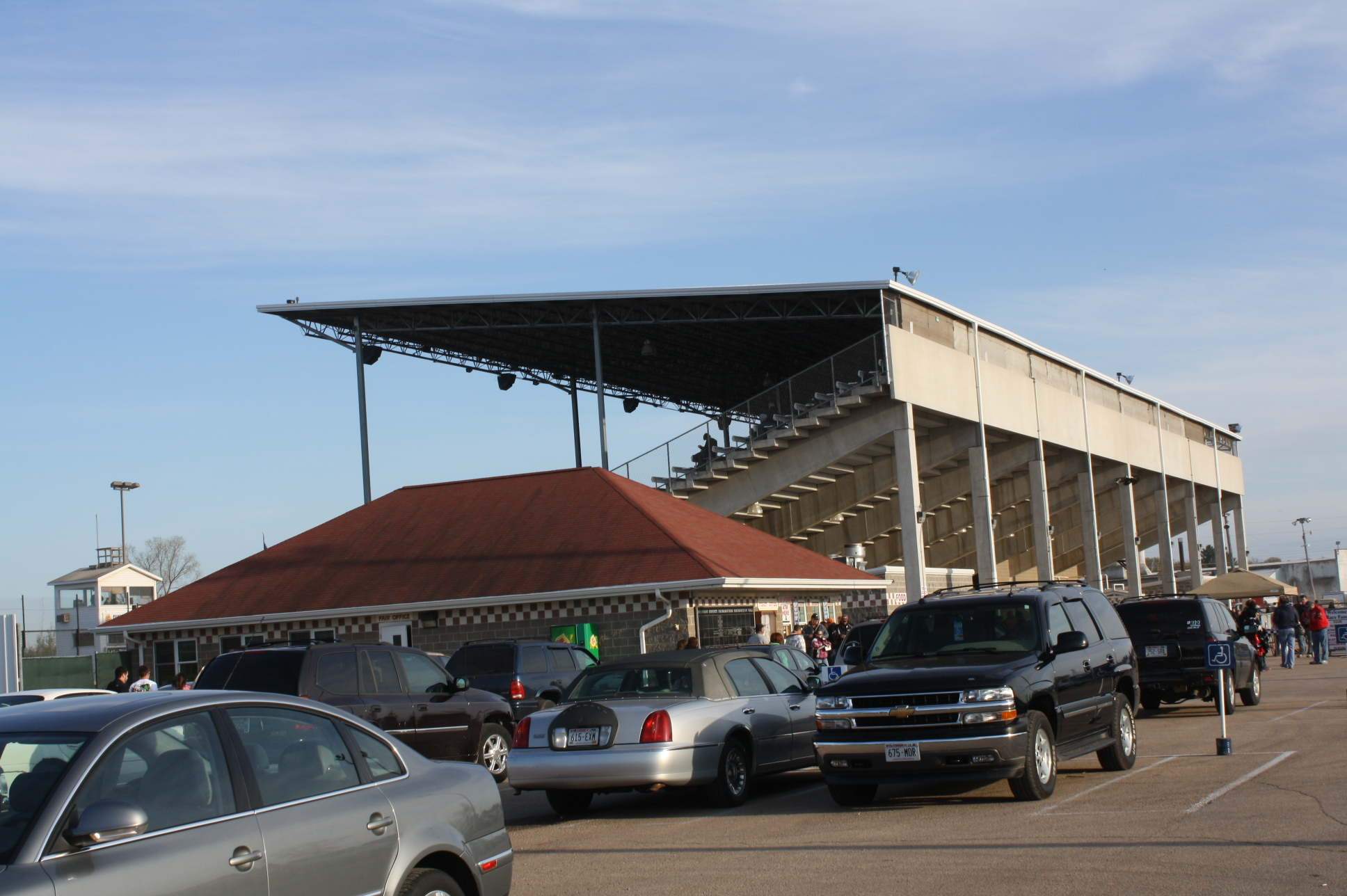
Shawano County Fairgrounds

According to the U.S. Census Bureau, the county has a total area of 909 square miles (2,350 km^{2}), of which 893 square miles (2,310 km^{2}) is land and 16 square miles (41 km^{2}) (1.8%) is water.

=== Adjacent counties ===
- Menominee County – north
- Oconto County – east
- Brown County – southeast
- Outagamie County – south
- Waupaca County – south
- Portage County – southwest
- Marathon County – west
- Langlade County – northwest

=== Major highways ===
- U.S. Highway 45
- Highway 22 (Wisconsin)
- Highway 29 (Wisconsin)
- Highway 32 (Wisconsin)
- Highway 47 (Wisconsin)
- Highway 52 (Wisconsin)
- Highway 55 (Wisconsin)
- Highway 110 (Wisconsin)
- Highway 117 (Wisconsin)
- Highway 153 (Wisconsin)
- Highway 156 (Wisconsin)
- Highway 160 (Wisconsin)
- Highway 187 (Wisconsin)

=== Railroads ===
- Watco

=== Airport ===
The city and county jointly operate the Shawano Municipal Airport (KEZS), which is located on Shawano Lake.

== Demographics ==
Historical population
Census	Pop.	Note	%±
1860	829		—
1870	3,166		281.9%
1880	10,371		227.6%
1890	19,236		85.5%
1900	27,475		42.8%
1910	31,884		16.0%
1920	33,975		6.6%
1930	33,516		−1.4%
1940	35,378		5.6%
1950	35,249		−0.4%
1960	34,351		−2.5%
1970	32,650		−5.0%
1980	35,928		10.0%
1990	37,157		3.4%
2000	40,664		9.4%
2010	41,949		3.2%
2020	40,881		−2.5%
2025 (est.)	41,560	▲	1.7%
U.S. Decennial Census; 1790–1960 1900–1990; 1990–2000 2010 2020

2000 Census age pyramid for Shawano County

=== 2020 census ===
As of the 2020 census, there were 40,881 people, 17,139 households, and 11,265 families residing in the county. The population density was 45.8 people per square mile (17.7 people/km^{2}).

Of the 17,139 households, 25.8% had children under the age of 18 living in them, 49.8% were married-couple households, 19.5% were households with a male householder and no spouse or partner present, and 22.4% were households with a female householder and no spouse or partner present. About 29.2% of all households were made up of individuals and 14.0% had someone living alone who was 65 years of age or older.

There were 20,354 housing units at an average density of 22.8 units per square mile (8.8 units/km^{2}), of which 15.8% were vacant. Among the occupied housing units, 76.9% were owner-occupied and 23.1% were renter-occupied; the homeowner vacancy rate was 1.2% and the rental vacancy rate 6.9%.

The median age was 45.7 years, with 21.3% of residents under the age of 18 and 21.9% of residents aged 65 years or older. For every 100 females there were 101.9 males, and for every 100 females age 18 and over there were 100.6 males.

The racial makeup of the county was 84.8% White, 0.3% Black or African American, 8.5% American Indian and Alaska Native, 0.4% Asian, less than 0.1% Native Hawaiian and Pacific Islander, 1.2% from some other race, and 4.8% from two or more races, with Hispanic or Latino residents of any race comprising 2.9% of the population.

29.9% of residents lived in urban areas, while 70.1% lived in rural areas.

=== Racial and ethnic composition ===
Shawano County, Wisconsin – Racial and ethnic composition Note: the US Census treats Hispanic/Latino as an ethnic category. This table excludes Latinos from the racial categories and assigns them to a separate category. Hispanics/Latinos may be of any race.
Race / ethnicity (NH = Non-Hispanic)	Pop 1980	Pop 1990	Pop 2000	Pop 2010	Pop 2020	% 1980	% 1990	% 2000	% 2010	% 2020
White alone (NH)	34,422	35,162	37,102	36,951	34,404	95.81%	94.63%	91.24%	88.09%	84.16%
Black or African American alone (NH)	7	42	90	131	117	0.02%	0.11%	0.22%	0.31%	0.29%
Native American or Alaska Native alone (NH)	1,366	1,755	2,468	3,025	3,309	3.80%	4.72%	6.07%	7.21%	8.09%
Asian alone (NH)	36	69	134	180	165	0.10%	0.19%	0.33%	0.43%	0.40%
Native Hawaiian or Pacific Islander alone (NH)	x	x	17	12	6	x	x	0.04%	0.03%	0.01%
Other race alone (NH)	11	0	1	8	59	0.03%	0.00%	0.00%	0.02%	0.14%
Mixed race or Multiracial (NH)	x	x	445	737	1,645	x	x	1.09%	1.76%	4.02%
Hispanic or Latino (any race)	86	129	407	905	1,176	0.24%	0.35%	1.00%	2.16%	2.88%
Total	35,928	37,157	40,664	41,949	40,881	100.00%	100.00%	100.00%	100.00%	100.00%

=== 2000 census ===
As of the census of 2000, there were 40,664 people, 15,815 households, and 11,149 families residing in the county. The population density was 46 people per square mile (18 people/km^{2}). There were 18,317 housing units at an average density of 20 units per square mile (7.7 units/km^{2}). The racial makeup of the county was 91.61% White, 0.22% Black or African American, 6.26% Native American, 0.33% Asian, 0.04% Pacific Islander, 0.31% from other races, and 1.22% from two or more races. 1.00% of the population were Hispanic or Latino of any race. 54.9% were of German and 8.1% Polish ancestry.

There were 15,815 households, out of which 31.50% had children under the age of 18 living with them, 58.30% were married couples living together, 8.00% had a female householder with no husband present, and 29.50% were non-families. 24.90% of all households were made up of individuals, and 12.10% had someone living alone who was 65 years of age or older. The average household size was 2.51 and the average family size was 3.00.

In the county, the population was spread out, with 25.70% under the age of 18, 6.90% from 18 to 24, 27.50% from 25 to 44, 23.10% from 45 to 64, and 16.80% who were 65 years of age or older. The median age was 38 years. For every 100 females there were 99.80 males. For every 100 females age 18 and over, there were 97.60 males.

In 2017, there were 465 births, giving a general fertility rate of 69.8 births per 1000 women aged 15–44, the 18th highest rate out of all 72 Wisconsin counties. Additionally, there were 16 reported induced abortions performed on women of Shawano County residence in 2017.

== Communities ==
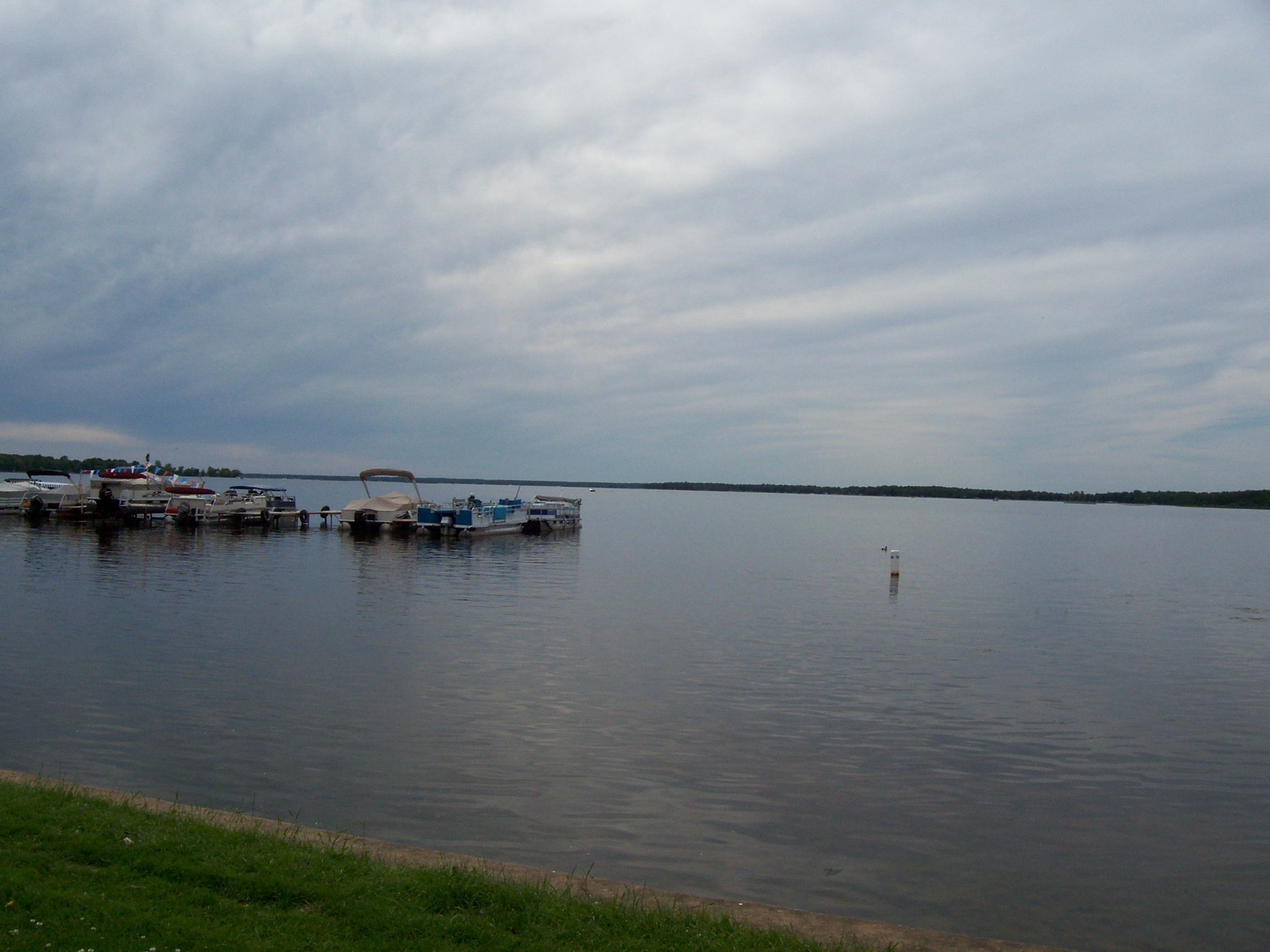
Shawano Lake, from the east shore in Cecil looking west

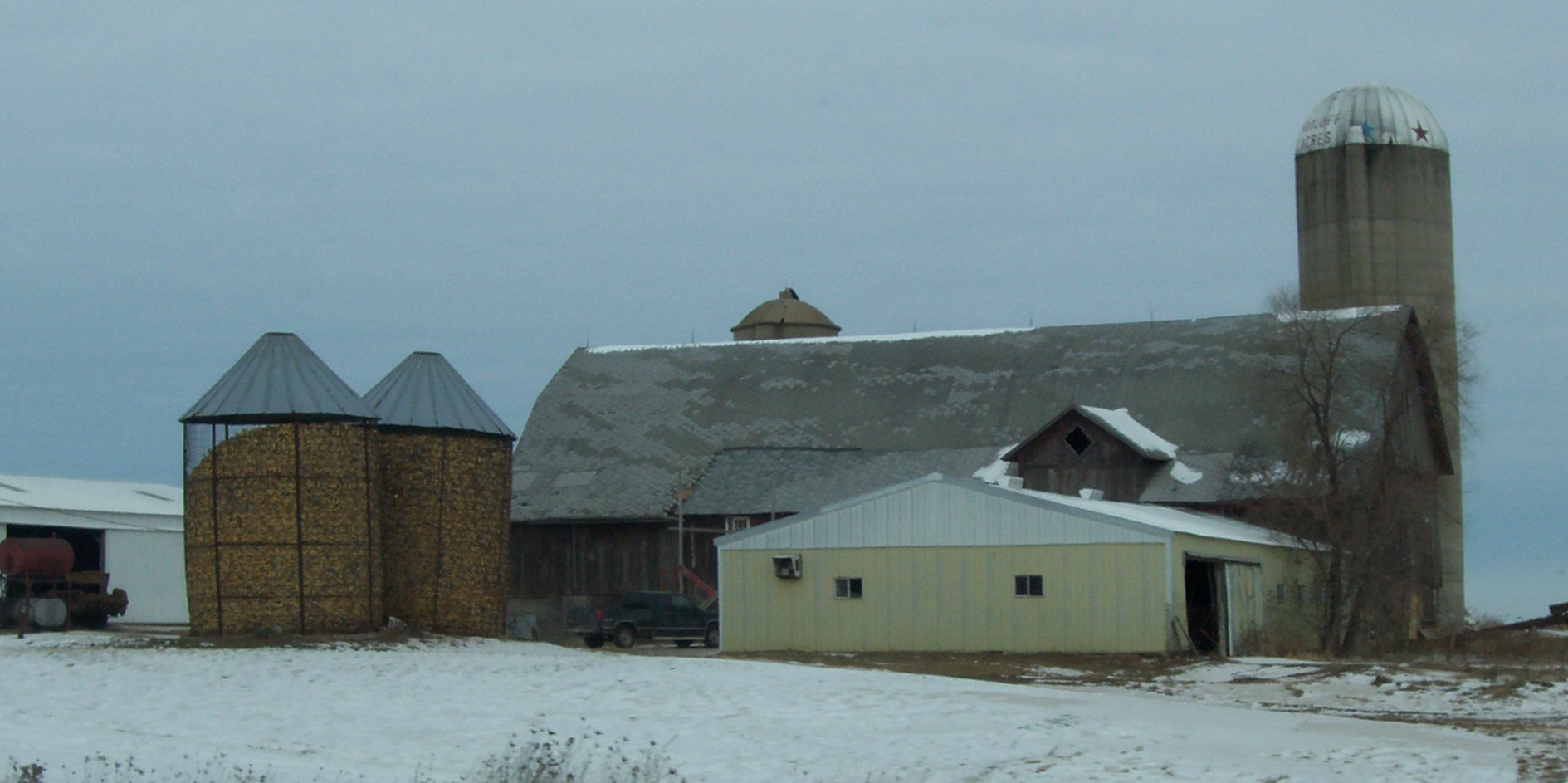
Rural Shawano County buildings

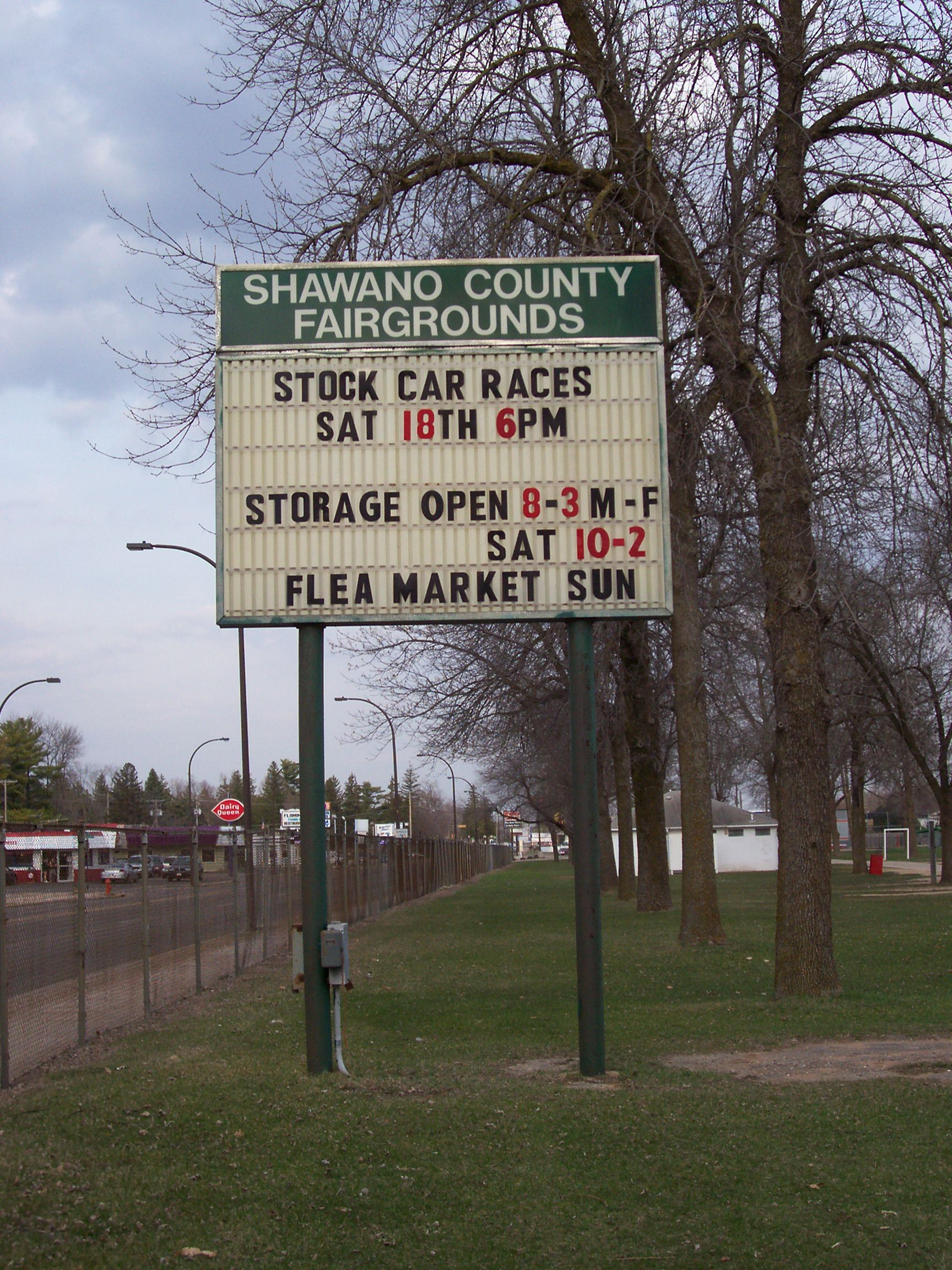
Fairgrounds sign

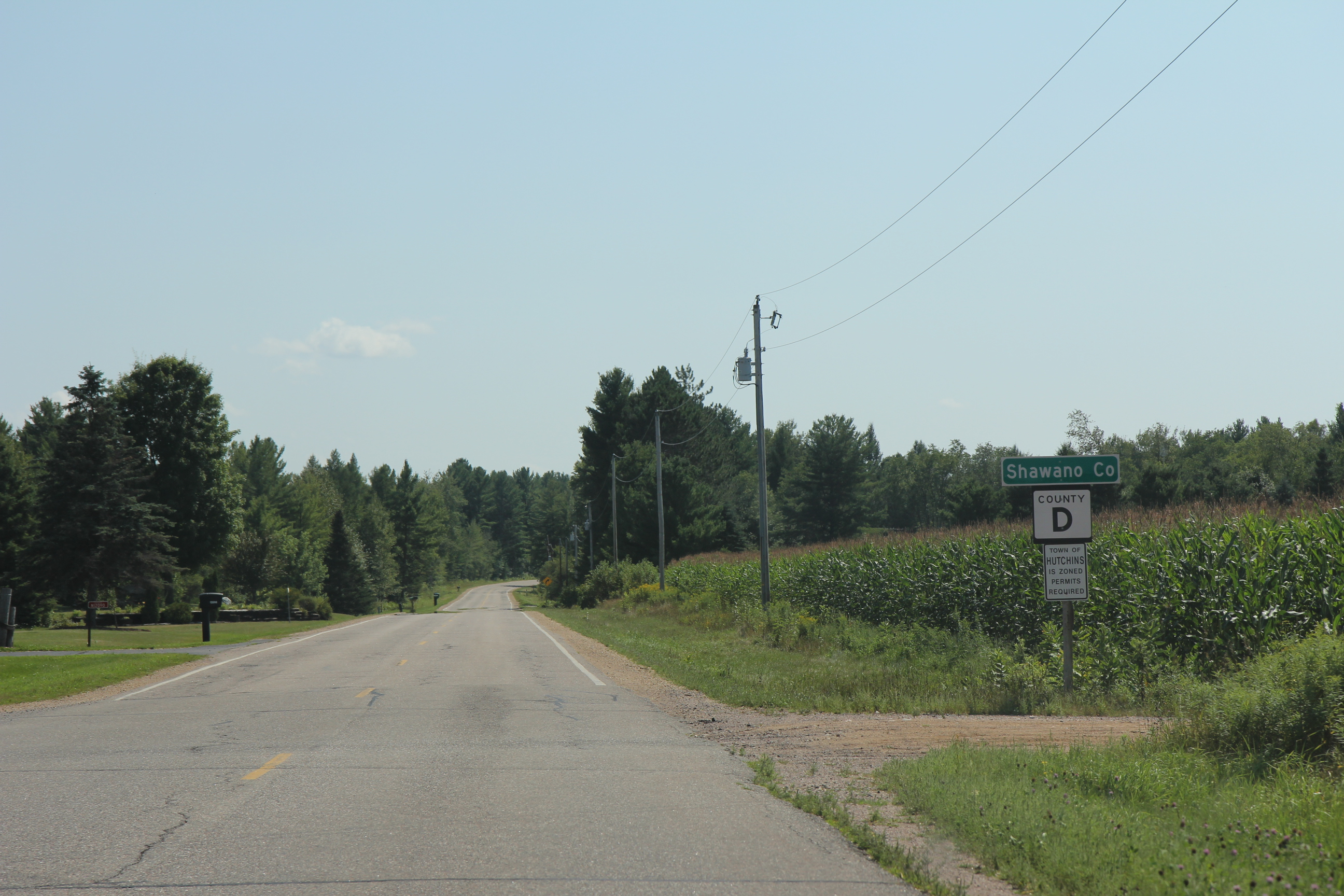
Sign for Shawano County on CTH D

=== Cities ===
- Marion (mostly in Waupaca County)
- Shawano (county seat)

=== Villages ===
- Aniwa
- Birnamwood (partly in Marathon County)
- Bonduel
- Bowler
- Cecil
- Eland
- Gresham
- Mattoon
- Pulaski (mostly in Brown County and Oconto County)
- Tigerton
- Wittenberg

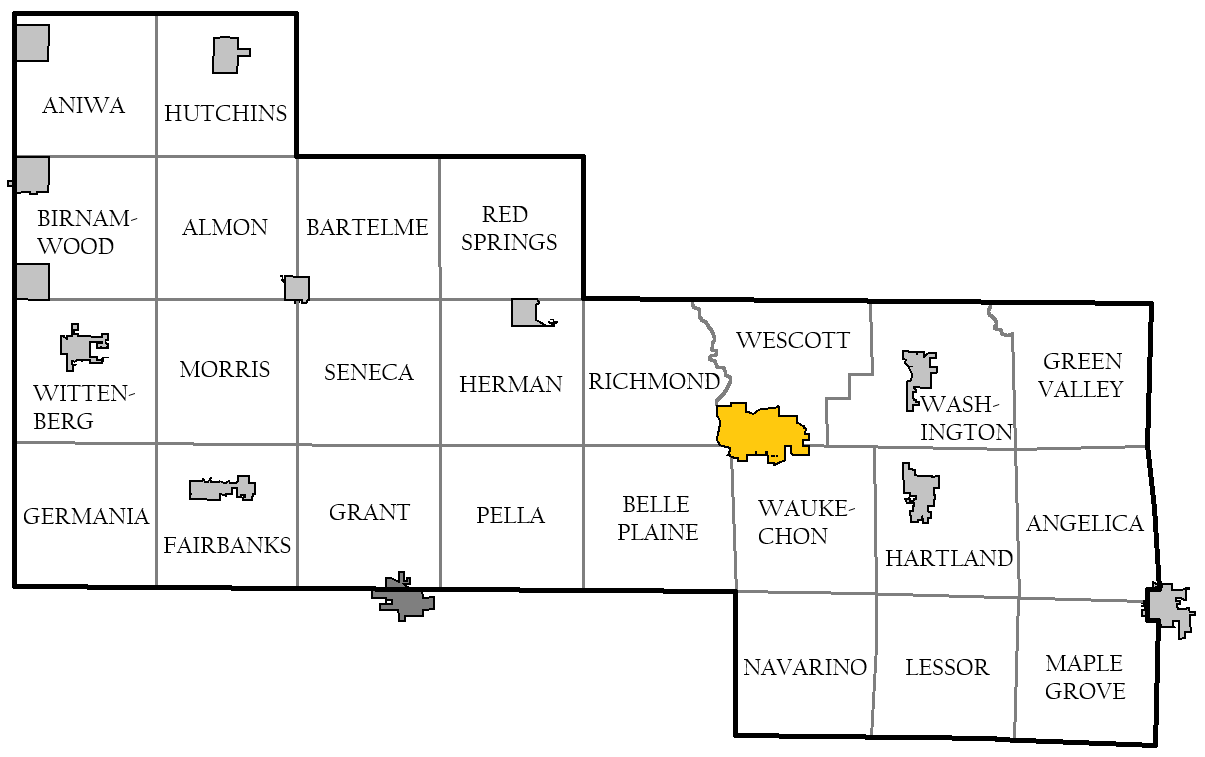
Towns of Shawano County

=== Towns ===
- Almon
- Angelica
- Aniwa
- Bartelme
- Belle Plaine
- Birnamwood
- Fairbanks
- Germania
- Grant
- Green Valley
- Hartland
- Herman
- Hutchins
- Lessor
- Maple Grove
- Morris
- Navarino
- Pella
- Red Springs
- Richmond
- Seneca
- Washington
- Waukechon
- Wescott
- Wittenberg

=== Census-designated places ===
- Angelica
- Caroline
- Green Valley
- Krakow
- Leopolis
- Middle Village (partial)
- Navarino
- Paac Ciinak
- Pella
- Pulcifer
- Thornton
- Tilleda

=== Unincorporated communities ===
- Adams Beach
- Advance
- Belle Plaine
- Briarton
- Five Corners
- Frazer Corners
- Hofa Park
- Hunting
- Landstad
- Laney
- Lunds
- Lyndhurst
- Morgan
- Pittsfield (partial)
- Red River
- Rose Lawn
- Shepley
- Slab City
- Split Rock
- Whitcomb
- Zachow

== Politics ==
United States presidential election results for Shawano County, Wisconsin
Year	Republican		Democratic		Third party(ies)	
Year	No.	%	No.	%	No.	%
1892	1,323	35.90%	2,040	55.36%	322	8.74%
1896	3,035	64.16%	1,594	33.70%	101	2.14%
1900	3,243	67.30%	1,504	31.21%	72	1.49%
1904	3,684	72.56%	1,239	24.40%	154	3.03%
1908	3,349	63.90%	1,750	33.39%	142	2.71%
1912	1,535	33.94%	1,661	36.72%	1,327	29.34%
1916	3,415	68.71%	1,367	27.51%	188	3.78%
1920	5,836	73.64%	525	6.62%	1,564	19.74%
1924	2,063	23.01%	471	5.25%	6,431	71.73%
1928	5,198	57.34%	3,779	41.69%	88	0.97%
1932	2,450	23.63%	7,593	73.24%	324	3.13%
1936	3,679	28.46%	8,865	68.59%	381	2.95%
1940	6,377	54.16%	5,241	44.51%	156	1.32%
1944	8,732	68.16%	4,015	31.34%	64	0.50%
1948	6,286	58.97%	4,192	39.33%	181	1.70%
1952	11,131	76.76%	3,334	22.99%	36	0.25%
1956	9,388	71.54%	3,675	28.01%	59	0.45%
1960	9,734	67.18%	4,734	32.67%	21	0.14%
1964	6,519	49.74%	6,560	50.06%	26	0.20%
1968	8,444	63.75%	3,602	27.20%	1,199	9.05%
1972	8,807	67.01%	3,940	29.98%	395	3.01%
1976	8,505	54.64%	6,751	43.37%	310	1.99%
1980	9,922	60.96%	5,410	33.24%	944	5.80%
1984	10,635	65.55%	5,469	33.71%	121	0.75%
1988	8,362	55.57%	6,587	43.78%	98	0.65%
1992	7,253	40.40%	6,062	33.77%	4,637	25.83%
1996	6,396	41.26%	6,850	44.19%	2,254	14.54%
2000	9,548	54.24%	7,335	41.67%	720	4.09%
2004	12,150	57.86%	8,657	41.23%	192	0.91%
2008	9,538	47.48%	10,259	51.07%	292	1.45%
2012	11,022	54.35%	9,000	44.38%	257	1.27%
2016	12,769	64.46%	6,068	30.63%	973	4.91%
2020	15,173	67.09%	7,131	31.53%	311	1.38%
2024	15,850	67.45%	7,336	31.22%	314	1.34%

In presidential elections, Shawano County is strongly Republican, and has voted Democratic on three occasions since 1940, each time by margins of less than four percent.

== See also ==
- National Register of Historic Places listings in Shawano County, Wisconsin
