= Angelica (CDP), Wisconsin =

Census-designated place in Wisconsin, United States

Angelica, Wisconsin
- Census-designated place
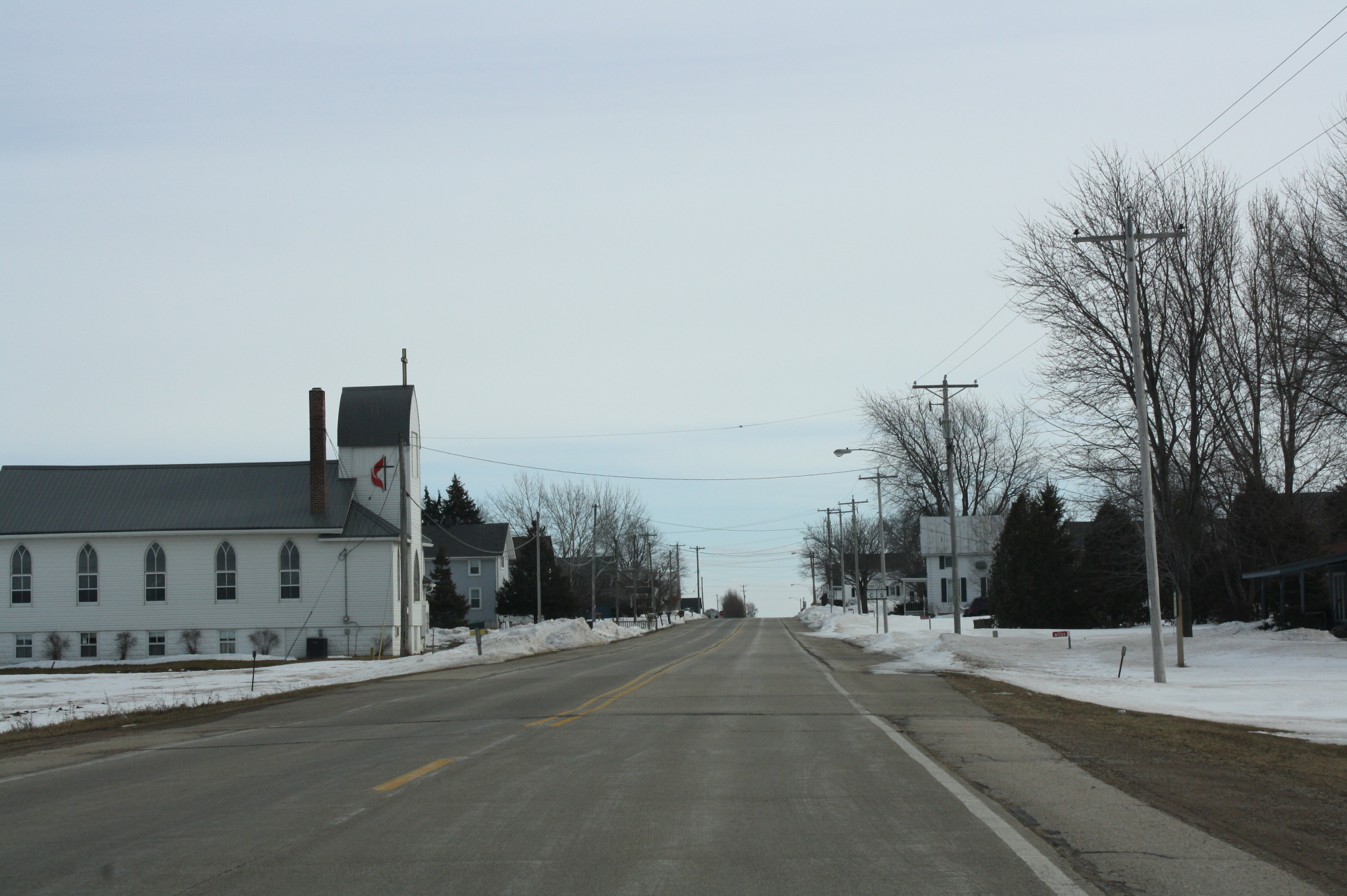
- Looking south in downtown Angelica

- Location within Wisconsin
- Coordinates: 44°40′26″N 88°18′49″W
- Country: United States
- State: Wisconsin
- County: Shawano

Area
  - Total: 1.56 sq mi (4.05 km^{2})
  - Land: 1.56 sq mi (4.05 km^{2})
  - Water: 0 sq mi (0.00 km^{2})
- Elevation: 879 ft (268 m)

Population (2020)
  - Total: 94
  - Density: 60/sq mi (23/km^{2})
- Time zone: UTC-6 (Central (CST))
  - Summer (DST): UTC-5 (CDT)
- Area codes: 715 & 534
- GNIS feature ID: 1560867

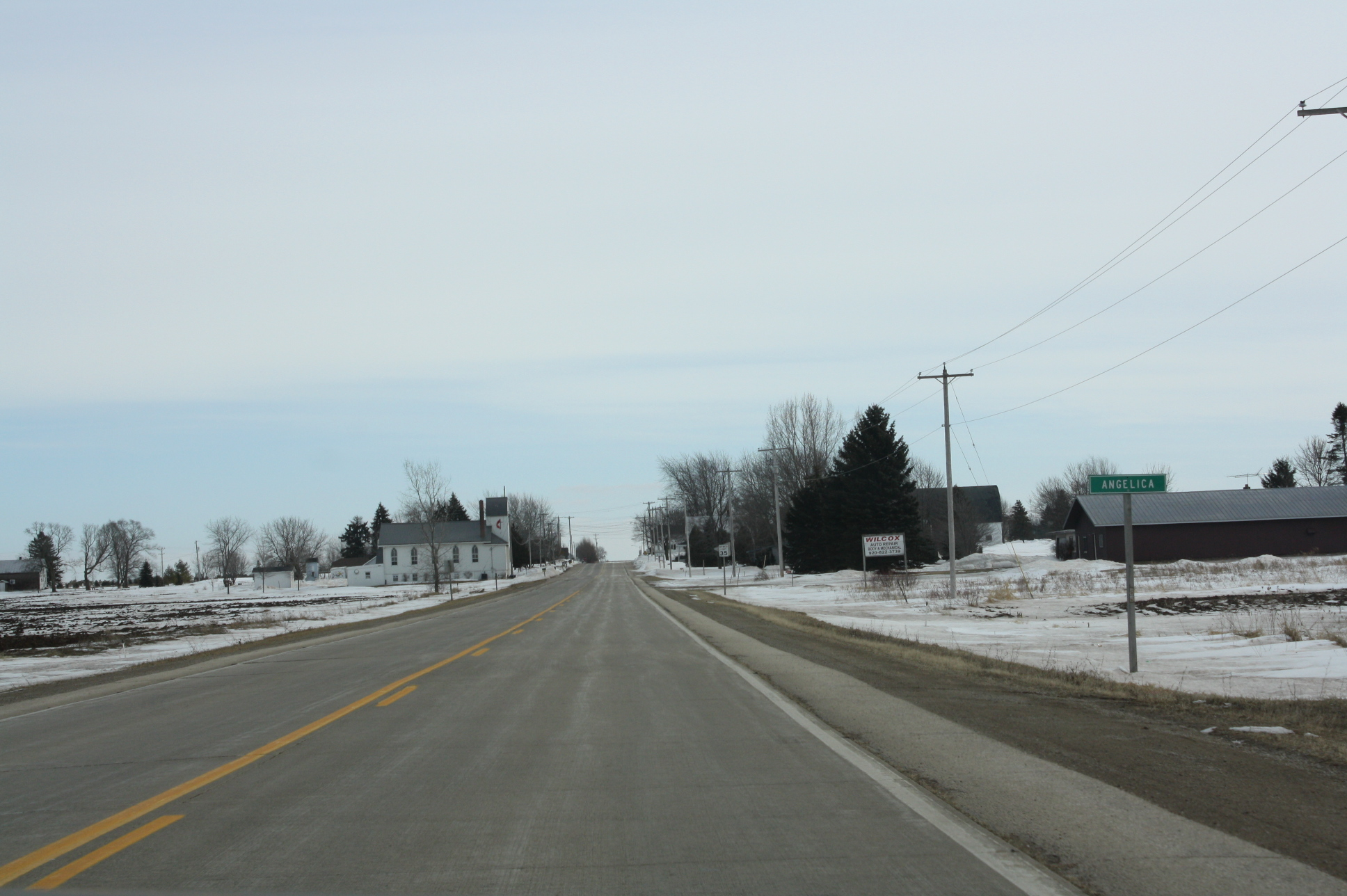
Angelica sign

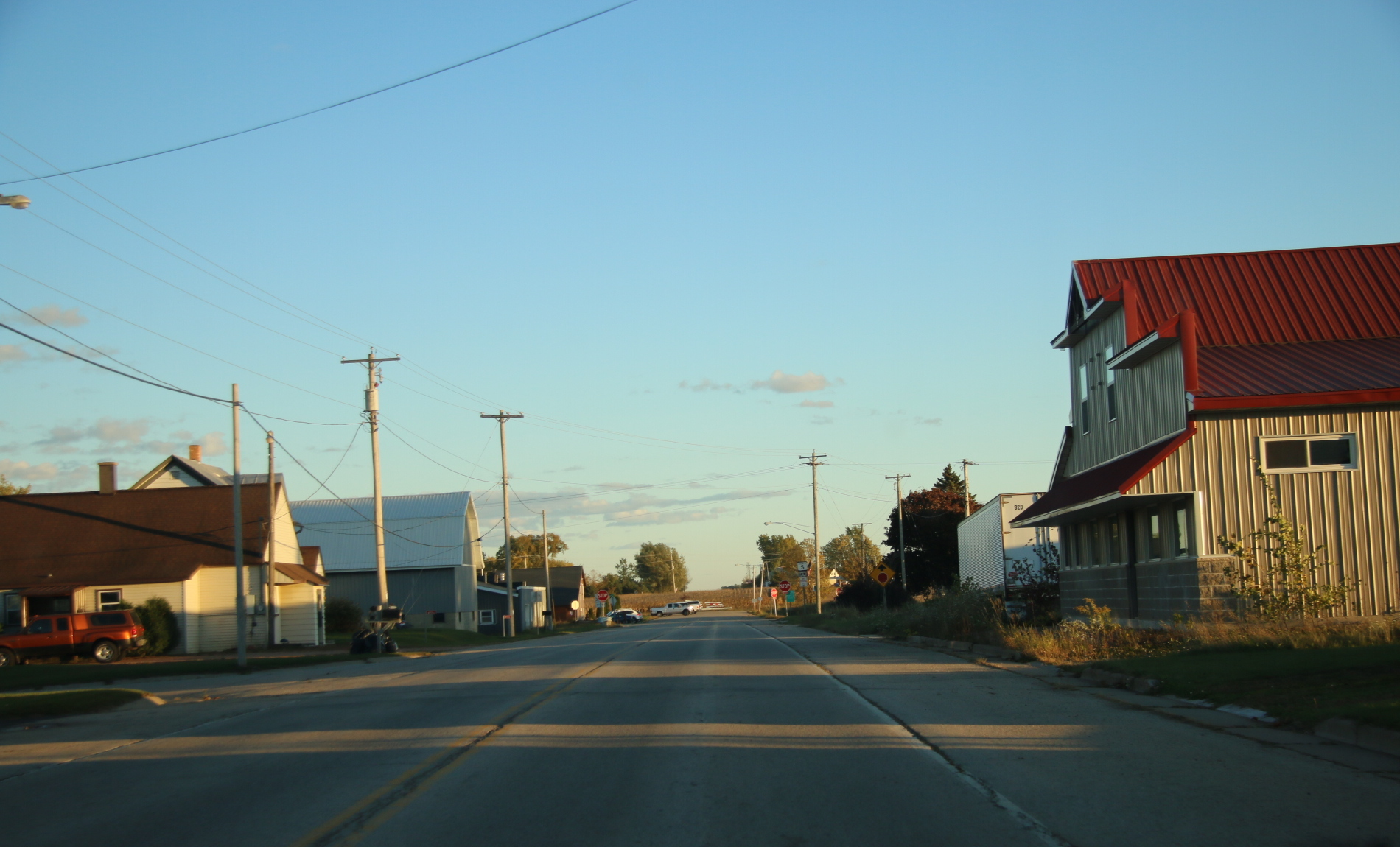
Downtown Angelica in 2020

Angelica is a census-designated place in the towns of Angelica and Maple Grove in Shawano County, Wisconsin, United States. Its population was 94 as of the 2020 census.

== Demographics ==
Historical population
Census	Pop.	Note	%±
2010	92		—
2020	94		2.2%
U.S. Decennial Census
