= Hartland, Shawano County, Wisconsin =

Hartland, Wisconsin
- Town
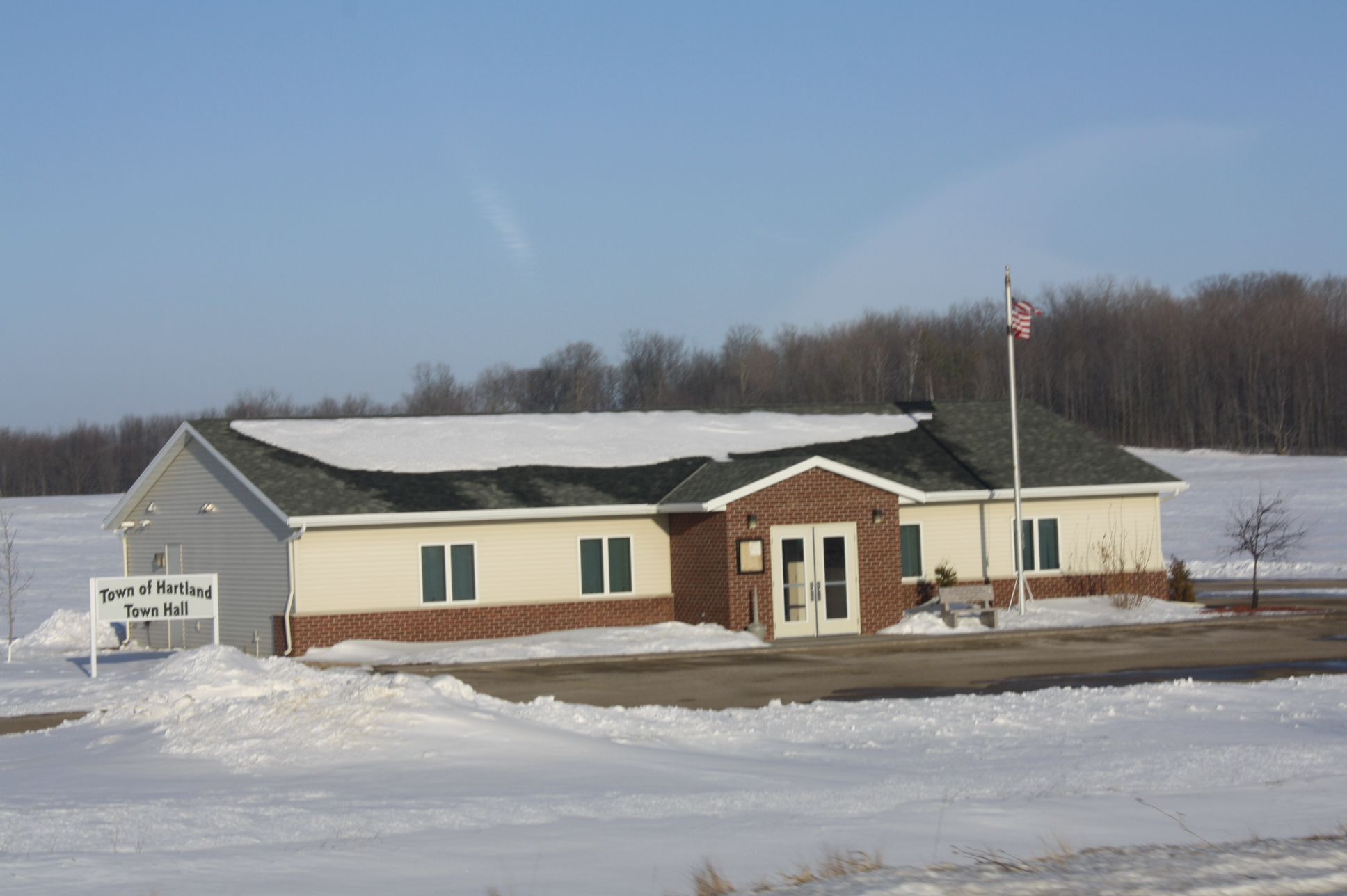
- Current town hall

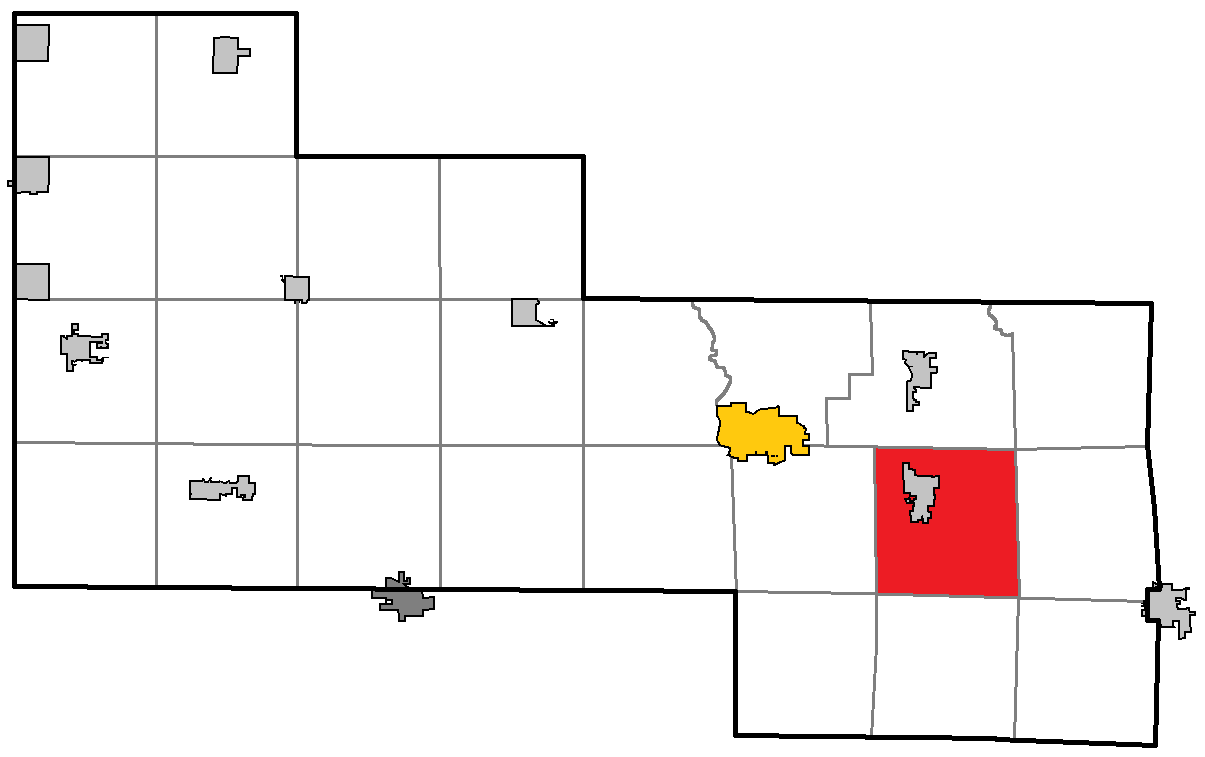
- Location of Hartland, within Shawano County, Wisconsin
- Coordinates: 44°43′14″N 88°25′55″W
- Country: United States
- State: Wisconsin
- County: Shawano

Area
  - Total: 34.7 sq mi (90.0 km^{2})
  - Land: 34.6 sq mi (89.5 km^{2})
  - Water: 0.15 sq mi (0.4 km^{2})
- Elevation: 856 ft (261 m)

Population (2020)
  - Total: 824
  - Density: 23.8/sq mi (9.21/km^{2})
- Time zone: UTC-6 (Central (CST))
  - Summer (DST): UTC-5 (CDT)
- FIPS code: 55-33075
- GNIS feature ID: 1583362
- Website: www.townofhartlandwi.com

Hartland is a town in Shawano County, Wisconsin, United States. The population was 824 at the 2020 census. The unincorporated community of Slab City is located within the town. The unincorporated communities of Frazer Corners and Zachow are also located partially within the town. Hartland was established in 1859.

== Geography ==
According to the United States Census Bureau, the town has a total area of 34.7 square miles (90.0 km^{2}), of which 34.6 square miles (89.5 km^{2}) is land and 0.2 square mile (0.4 km^{2}) (0.46%) is water.

== Demographics ==
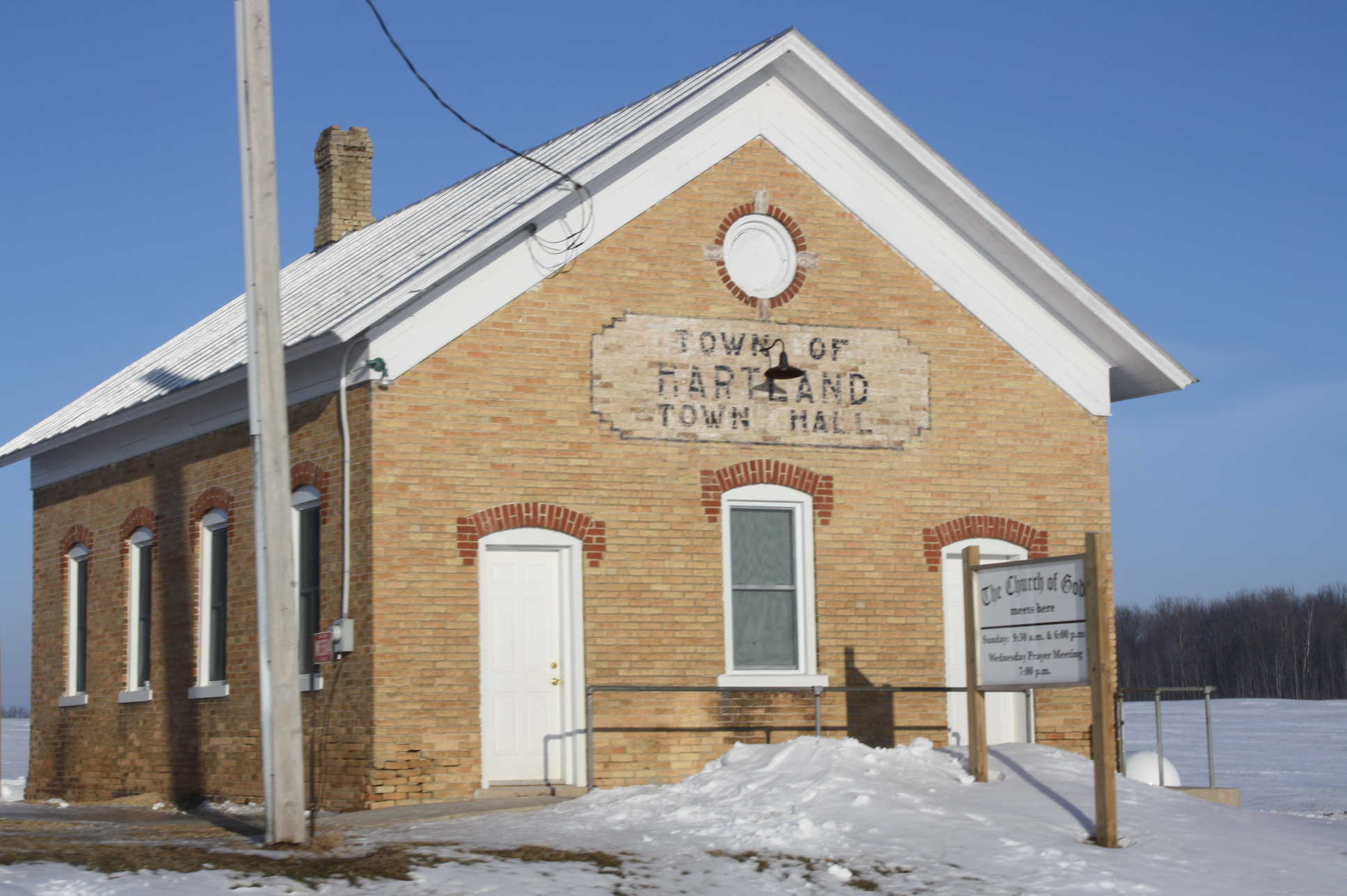
Former town hall

As of the census of 2000, there were 825 people, 280 households, and 234 families residing in the town. The population density was 23.9 people per square mile (9.2/km^{2}). There were 284 housing units at an average density of 8.2 per square mile (3.2/km^{2}). The racial makeup of the town was 98.30% White, 0.85% Native American, 0.12% Asian, 0.61% from other races, and 0.12% from two or more races. Hispanic or Latino of any race were 0.85% of the population.

There were 280 households, out of which 37.5% had children under the age of 18 living with them, 73.6% were married couples living together, 5.7% had a female householder with no husband present, and 16.1% were non-families. 11.4% of all households were made up of individuals, and 5.0% had someone living alone who was 65 years of age or older. The average household size was 2.95 and the average family size was 3.20.

In the town, the population was spread out, with 31.0% under the age of 18, 7.0% from 18 to 24, 28.6% from 25 to 44, 20.8% from 45 to 64, and 12.5% who were 65 years of age or older. The median age was 34 years. For every 100 females, there were 105.2 males. For every 100 females age 18 and over, there were 112.3 males.

The median income for a household in the town was $43,026, and the median income for a family was $43,355. Males had a median income of $31,731 versus $22,721 for females. The per capita income for the town was $17,837. About 5.3% of families and 7.5% of the population were below the poverty line, including 11.7% of those under age 18 and 2.6% of those age 65 or over.
