= Angelica, Wisconsin =

- Town
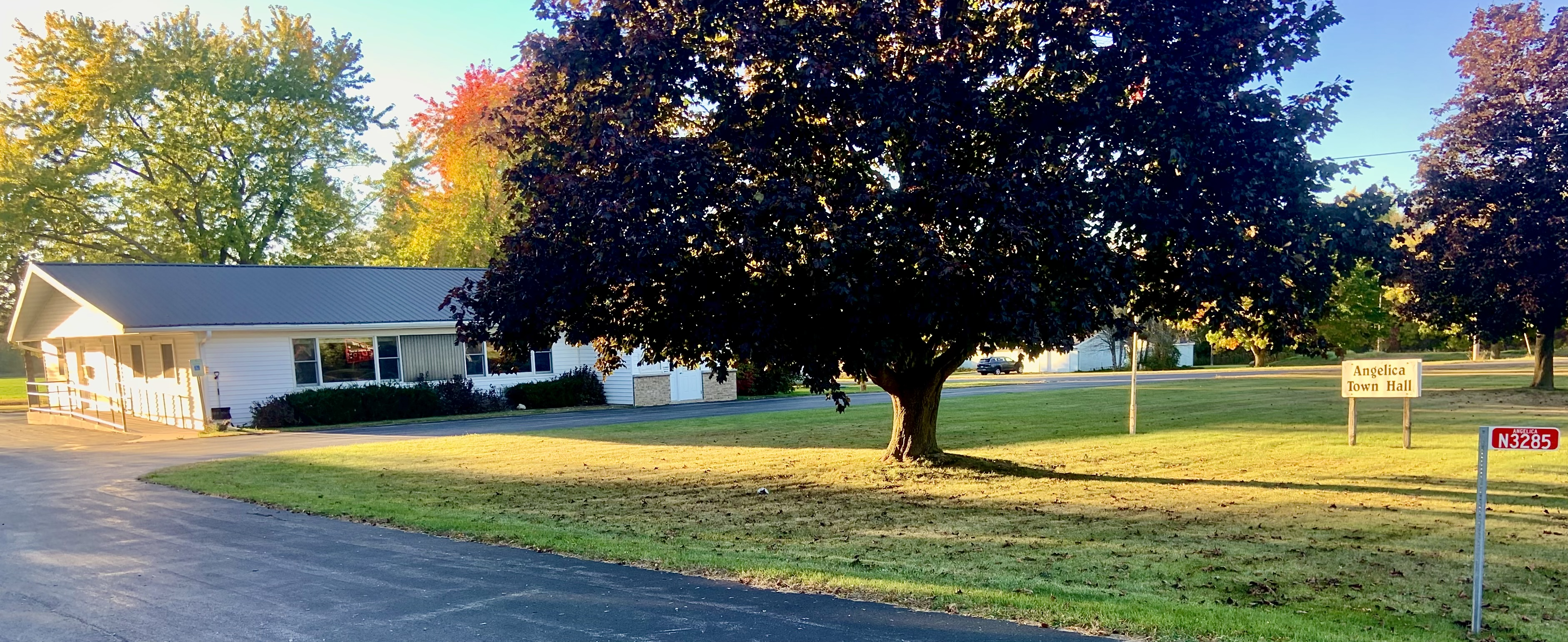
- Town hall

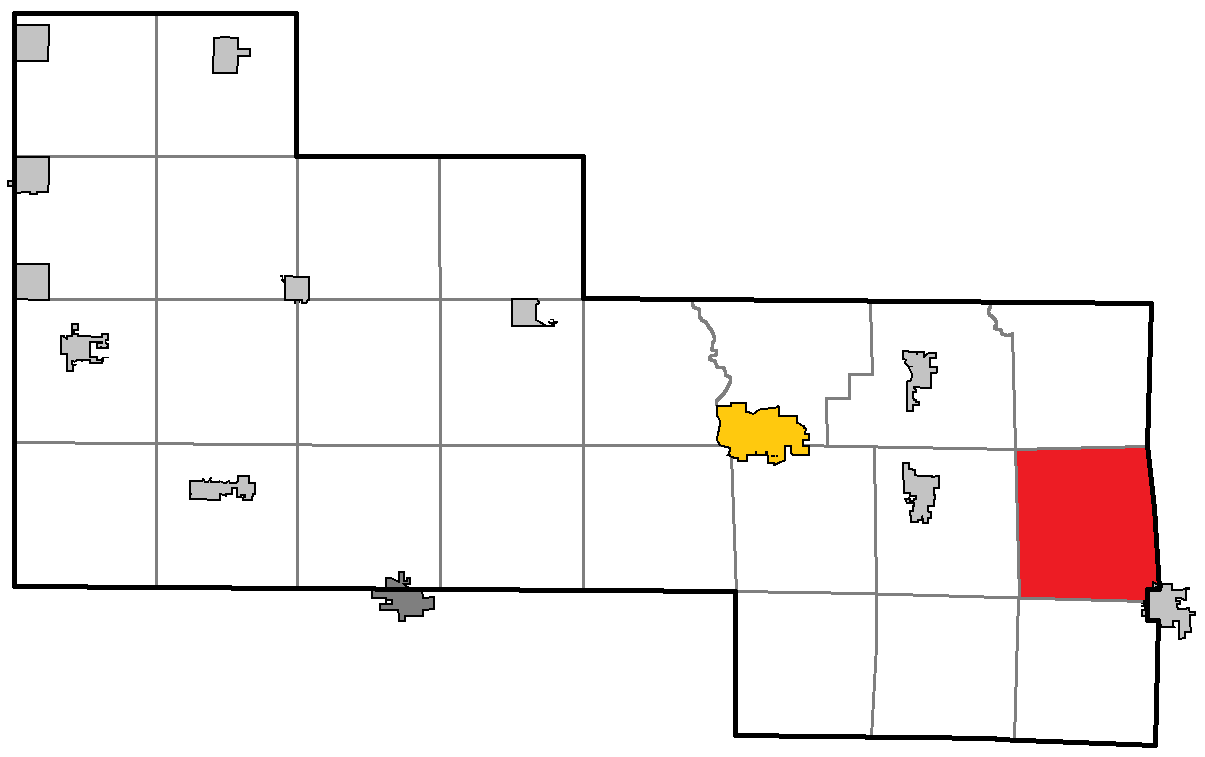
- Location of Angelica, Wisconsin
- Coordinates: 44°43′31″N 88°18′26″W
- Country: United States
- State: Wisconsin
- County: Shawano

Area
  - Total: 36.6 sq mi (94.9 km^{2})
  - Land: 36.6 sq mi (94.8 km^{2})
  - Water: 0.039 sq mi (0.1 km^{2})
- Elevation: 801 ft (244 m)

Population (2020)
  - Total: 1,822
  - Density: 49.8/sq mi (19.2/km^{2})
- Time zone: UTC-6 (Central (CST))
  - Summer (DST): UTC-5 (CDT)
- FIPS code: 55-01975
- GNIS feature ID: 1582695
- Website: http://www.townofangelica.com/

Angelica is a town in Shawano County, Wisconsin, United States. The population was 1,822 at the 2020 census. The unincorporated communities of Angelica, Frazer Corners, Krakow, and Zachow are located partially in the town. A post office named Angelica was established in 1866 until it was discontinued in 1916.

== Geography ==
According to the United States Census Bureau, the town has a total area of 36.6 square miles (94.8 km^{2}), of which 36.6 square miles (94.8 km^{2}) is land and 0.04 square miles (0.1 km^{2}) (0.05%) is water.

== Demographics ==
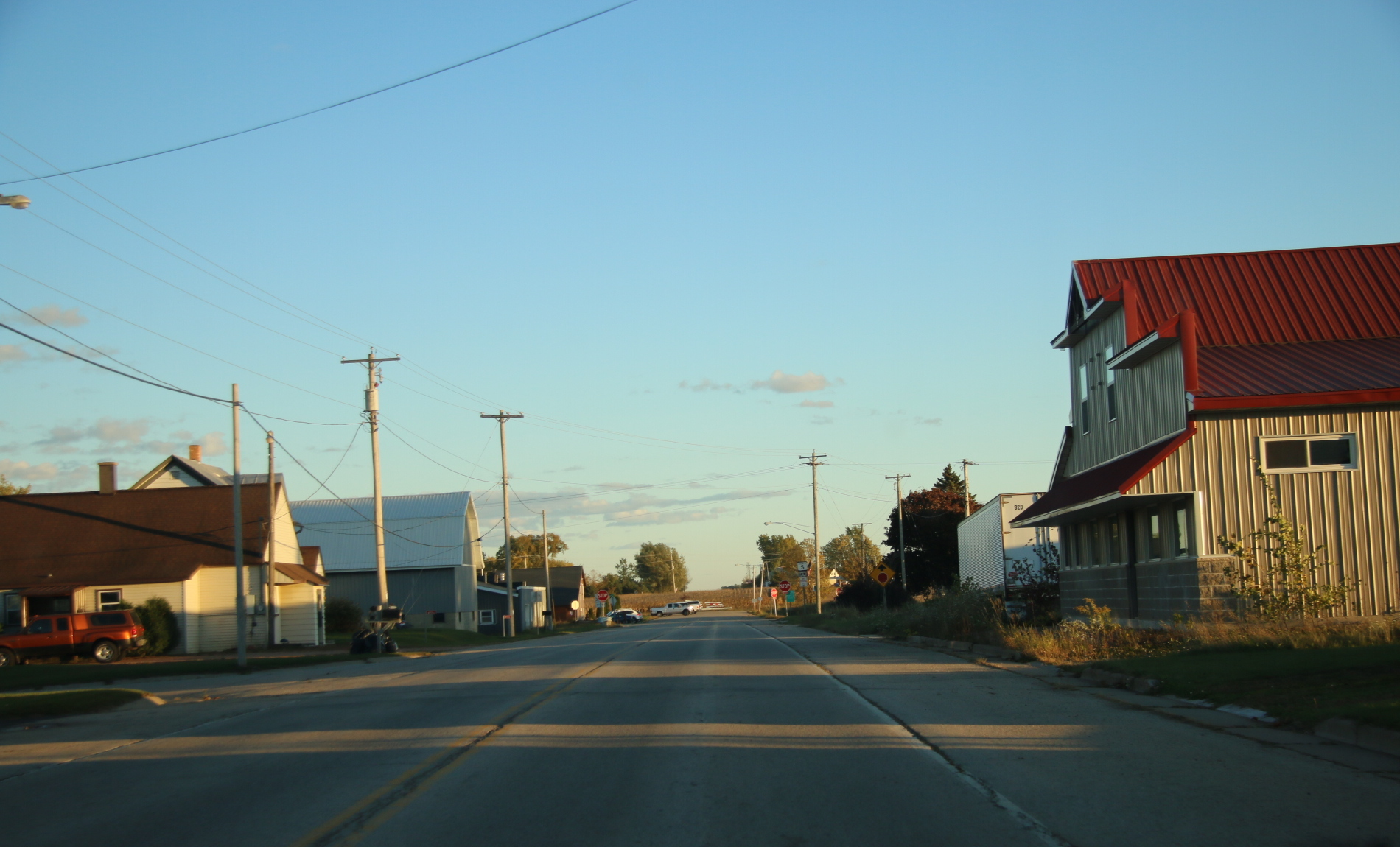
Downtown Angelica, October 2020

As of the 2000 census, there were 1,635 people, 585 households, and 468 families in the town. The population density was 44.7 people per square mile (17.2/km^{2}). There were 600 housing units at an average density of 16.4 per square mile (6.3/km^{2}). The racial makeup of the town was 98.35% White, 0.06% African American, 0.61% Native American, 0.49% Asian, 0.06% from other races, and 0.43% from two or more races. Hispanic or Latino of any race made up 0.06% of the population.

There were 585 households, of which 39.1% had children under the age of 18 living with them, 70.1% were married couples living together, 4.6% had a female householder with no husband present, and 20.0% were non-families. 17.1% of households were made up of individuals, and 8.7% were one person aged 65 or older. The average household size was 2.79, and the average family size was 3.15.

The age distribution was 29.2% under the age of 18, 6.2% from 18 to 24, 31.3% from 25 to 44, 21.8% from 45 to 64, and 11.5% 65 or older. The median age was 34 years. For every 100 females, there were 108.5 males. For every 100 females age 18 and over, there were 107.7 males.

The median household income was $48,500 and the median family income was $53,618. Males had a median income of $33,750 versus $22,891 for females. The per capita income for the town was $19,828. About 3.7% of families and 5.9% of the population were below the poverty line, including 9.2% of those under age 18 and 5.7% of those age 65 or over.

== See also ==
- List of census-designated places in Wisconsin
