= Bonduel, Wisconsin =

- Village
- Motto: Village of Bonduel, Gateway to Recreation
- Location of Bonduel in Shawano County, Wisconsin.
- Coordinates: 44°44′25″N 88°26′43″W
- Country: United States
- State: Wisconsin
- County: Shawano

Government
  - Village President: Russ Gehm

Area
  - Total: 2.26 sq mi (5.85 km^{2})
  - Land: 2.25 sq mi (5.84 km^{2})
  - Water: 0.0039 sq mi (0.01 km^{2})
- Elevation: 889 ft (271 m)

Population (2020)
  - Total: 1,417
  - Density: 661/sq mi (255.4/km^{2})
- Time zone: UTC-6 (Central (CST))
  - Summer (DST): UTC-5 (CDT)
- Area codes: 715 & 534
- FIPS code: 55-08725
- GNIS feature ID: 1562052
- Website: http://www.villageofbonduel.com

Bonduel is a village in Shawano County, Wisconsin, United States. The population was 1,417 at the 2020 census, and 1,478 at the 2010 census.

== History ==
As founded, the community did not have an officially agreed upon name. Some early news reports called it Hartland Corners, presumably in reference to the surrounding town, named Hartland. The name Bonduel was not established for the community until an application for a post office was made in 1864, at which point "Hartland" was rejected as already being in use as a village name in Wisconsin. Therefore, the village was named Bonduel when the post office was created. The village is named after a Jesuit missionary, the Rev. Florimond Bonduel, who served Wisconsin parishes and who worked with the Menominee Indians, helping them settle on their newly created reservation in 1853.

Bonduel incorporated as a village in 1916. Prior to this time, administrative affairs for the community were managed by the surrounding town of Hartland.

In 1964 attempts by the National Farmers Organization to get farmers to withhold their produce, milk and livestock from the market in order to boost prices resulted in the deaths of two NFO members who were run over by a cattle truck in Bonduel.

== Geography ==
Bonduel is located at 44°44′25″N 88°26′43″W (44.740388, -88.445291).

According to the United States Census Bureau, the village has a total area of 2.33 square miles (6.03 km^{2}), all land.

== Demographics ==
Historical population
Census	Pop.	Note	%±
1920	504		—
1930	534		6.0%
1940	661		23.8%
1950	742		12.3%
1960	876		18.1%
1970	995		13.6%
1980	1,160		16.6%
1990	1,210		4.3%
2000	1,416		17.0%
2010	1,478		4.4%
2020	1,417		−4.1%

=== 2010 census ===
As of the census of 2010, there were 1,478 people, 601 households, and 405 families living in the village. The population density was 634.3 inhabitants per square mile (244.9/km^{2}). There were 645 housing units at an average density of 276.8 per square mile (106.9/km^{2}). The racial makeup of the village was 95.4% White, 0.8% African American, 1.6% Native American, 0.4% Asian, 0.8% from other races, and 1.0% from two or more races. Hispanic or Latino of any race were 1.7% of the population.

There were 601 households, of which 34.1% had children under the age of 18 living with them, 51.7% were married couples living together, 10.5% had a female householder with no husband present, 5.2% had a male householder with no wife present, and 32.6% were non-families. 28.0% of all households were made up of individuals, and 11.8% had someone living alone who was 65 years of age or older. The average household size was 2.43 and the average family size was 2.96.

The median age in the village was 37.2 years. 26.2% of residents were under the age of 18; 7.8% were between the ages of 18 and 24; 27.3% were from 25 to 44; 22.5% were from 45 to 64; and 16.2% were 65 years of age or older. The gender makeup of the village was 49.7% male and 50.3% female.

=== 2000 census ===
As of the census of 2000, there were 1,416 people, 581 households, and 392 families living in the village. The population density was 645.0 people per square mile (248.5/km^{2}). There were 598 housing units at an average density of 272.4 per square mile (104.9/km^{2}). The racial makeup of the village was 96.68% White, 0.14% African American, 1.20% Native American, 1.13% from other races, and 0.85% from two or more races. Hispanic or Latino of any race were 1.91% of the population.

There were 581 households, out of which 33.6% had children under the age of 18 living with them, 55.9% were married couples living together, 7.1% had a female householder with no husband present, and 32.4% were non-families. 27.5% of all households were made up of individuals, and 13.9% had someone living alone who was 65 years of age or older. The average household size was 2.42 and the average family size was 2.94.

In the village, the population was spread out, with 26.2% under the age of 18, 8.0% from 18 to 24, 30.2% from 25 to 44, 18.3% from 45 to 64, and 17.3% who were 65 years of age or older. The median age was 34 years. For every 100 females, there were 96.9 males. For every 100 females age 18 and over, there were 92.8 males.

The median income for a household in the village was $39,625, and the median income for a family was $48,264. Males had a median income of $34,632 versus $21,741 for females. The per capita income for the village was $20,482. About 2.3% of families and 4.1% of the population were below the poverty line, including 3.4% of those under age 18 and 2.3% of those age 65 or over.

== Images ==
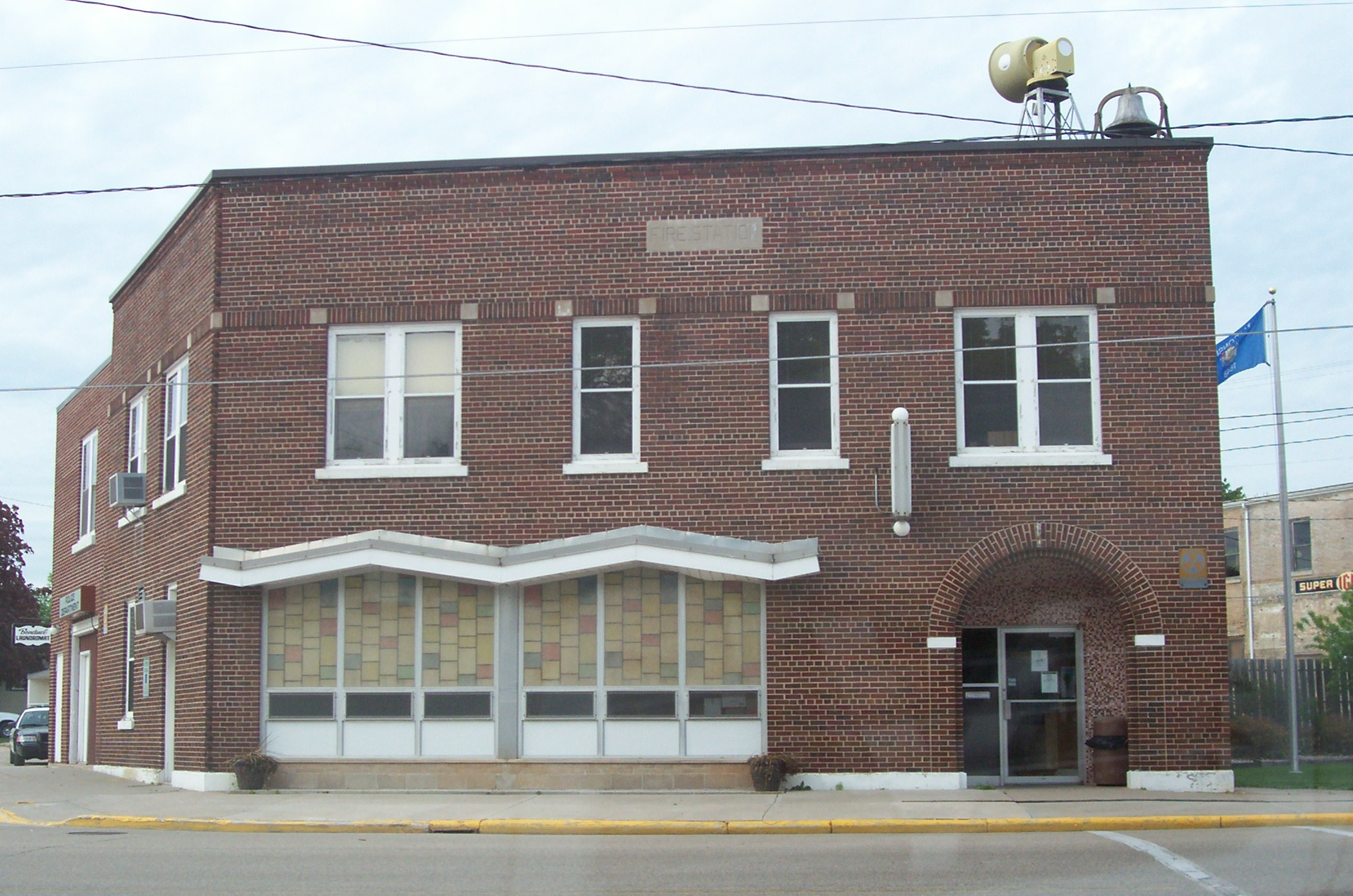
Village hall

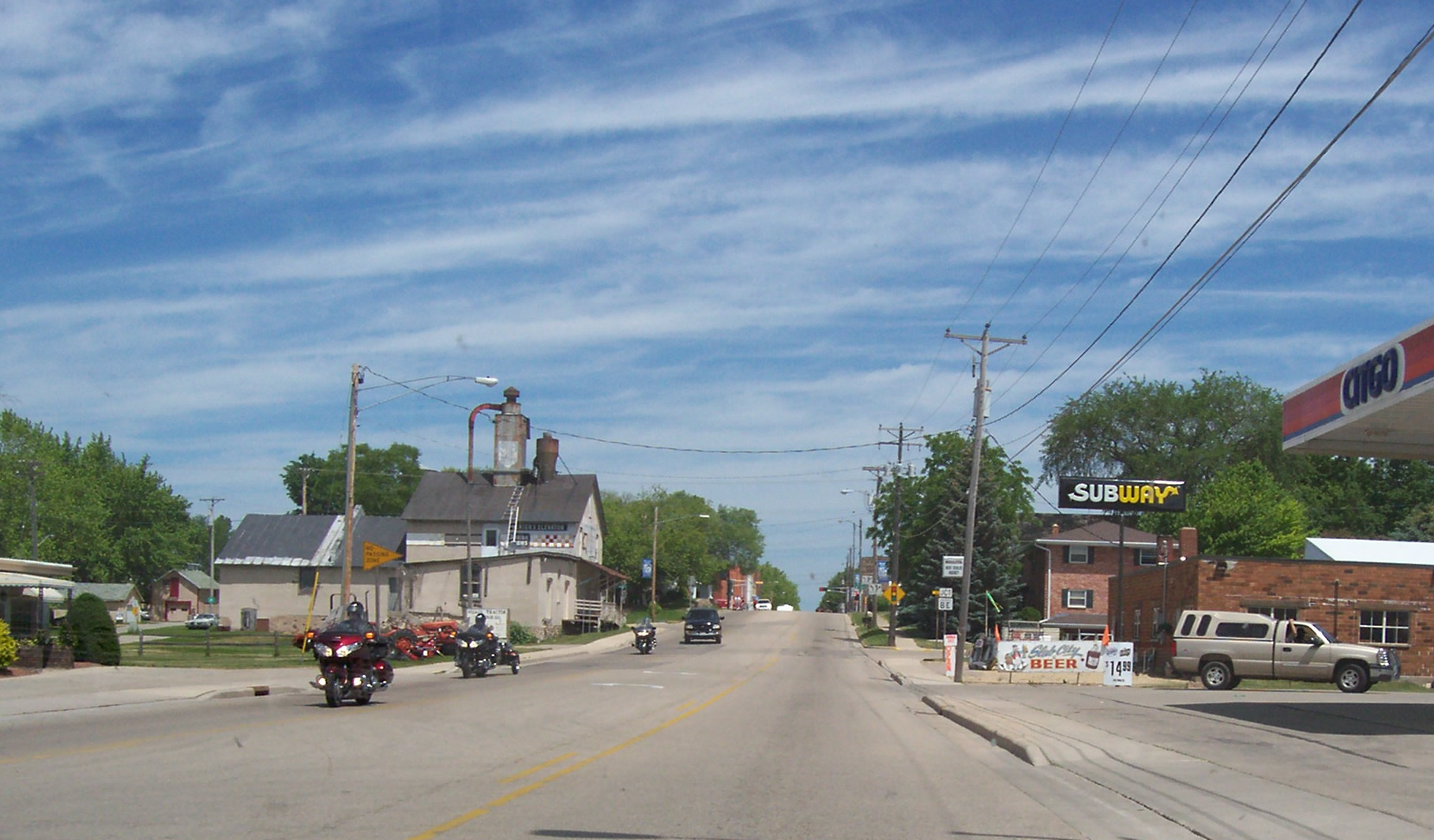
Traveling on WIS 117 in Bonduel

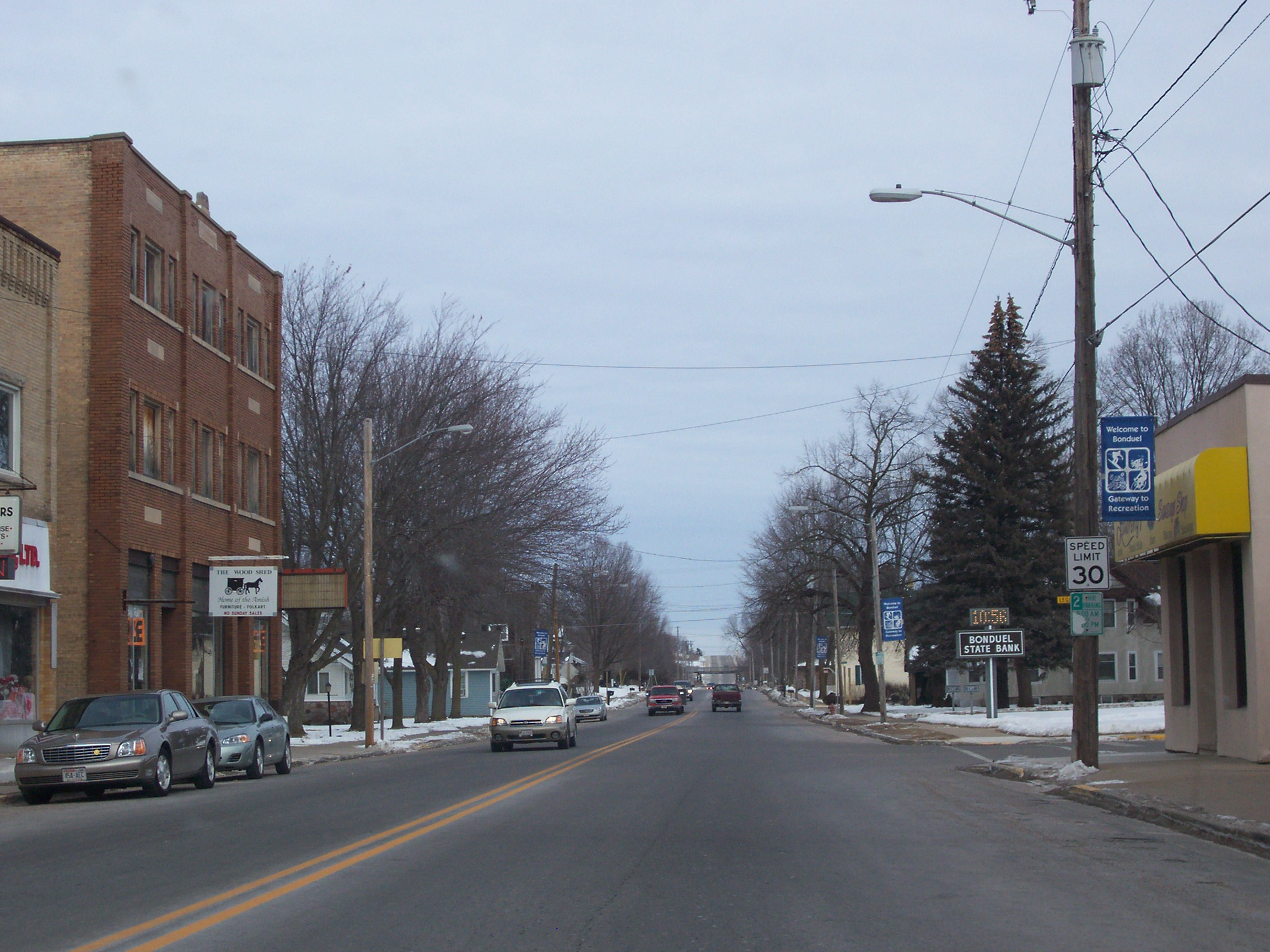
Downtown Bonduel

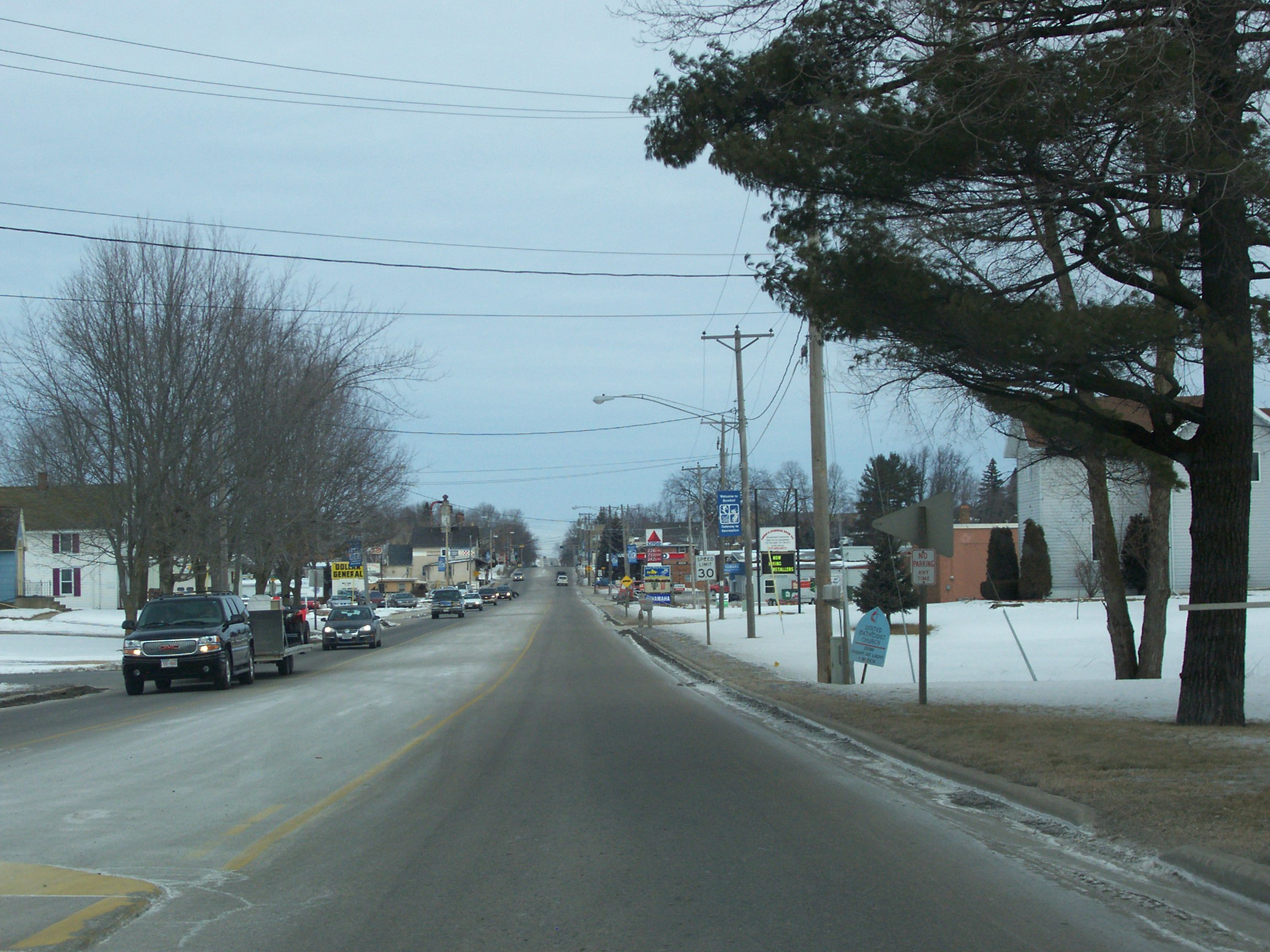
Downtown Bonduel

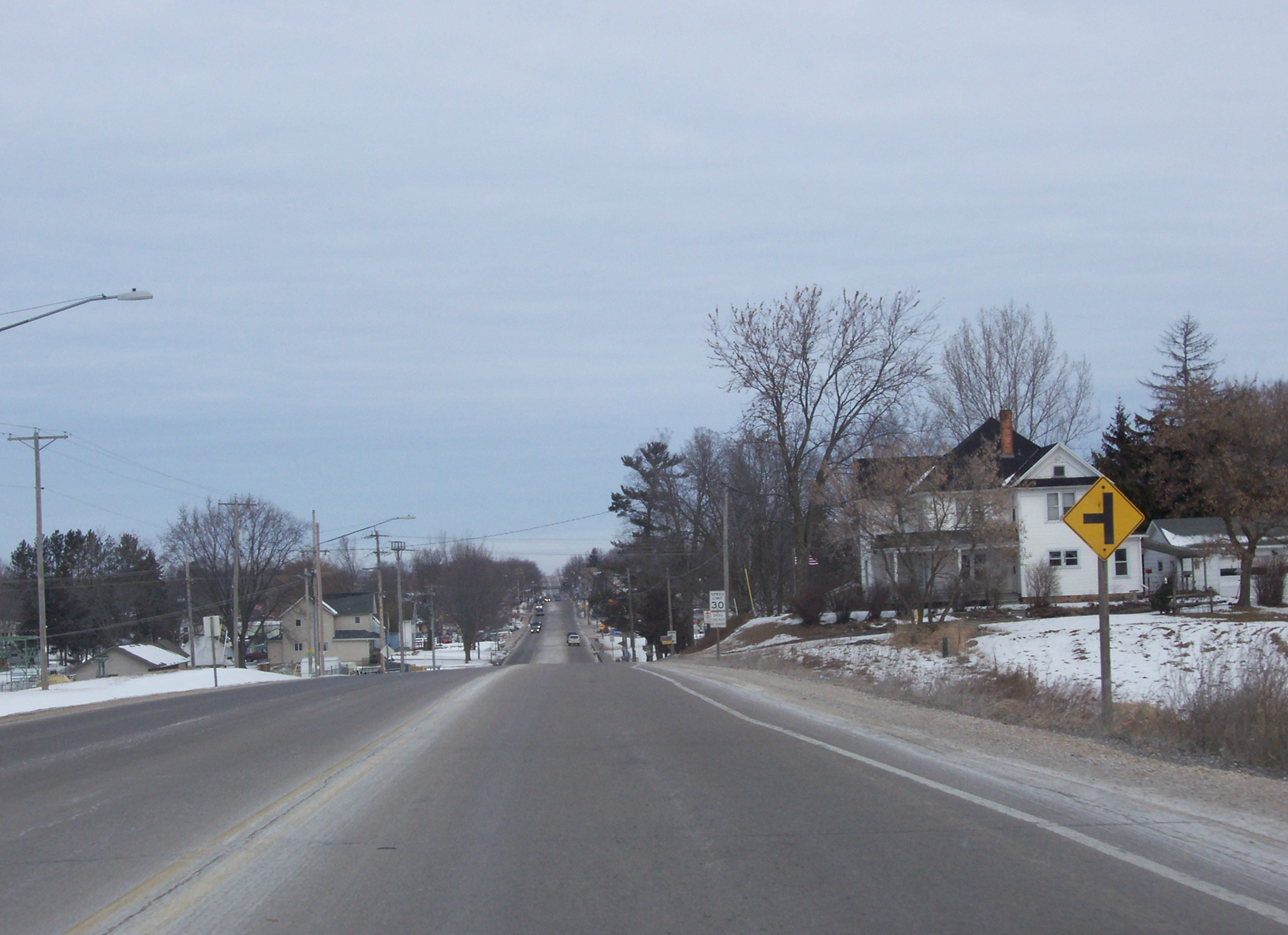
Overlooking Bonduel from the south
