= Pittsfield (community), Wisconsin =

Pittsfield, Wisconsin
- Unincorporated community
- Location within Wisconsin Location within the United States
- Coordinates: 44°35′58″N 88°14′42″W
- Country: United States
- State: Wisconsin
- Counties: Brown, Shawano
- Towns: Pittsfield, Maple Grove
- Elevation: 807 ft (246 m)
- Time zone: UTC-6 (Central (CST))
  - Summer (DST): UTC-5 (CDT)
- Area code: 920
- GNIS feature ID: 1577771

Pittsfield is an unincorporated community located in Brown and Shawano counties, Wisconsin, United States. The Brown County portion of Pittsfield is in the town of Pittsfield, while the Shawano County portion is in the town of Maple Grove. Pittsfield is at the junction of Wisconsin Highway 29 and Wisconsin Highway 156 5 miles (8.0 km) south of Pulaski.
