= Peleh =

Peleh or Pelleh or Poleh or Palleh or Pelah (Persian: پله) may refer to:

- Poleh, Hormozgan
- Pelah Kabud, Ilam Province
- Pelah, Kudristan
- Peleh-ye Baba Hoseyn, Lorestan Province
- Peleh-ye Kolkol, Ilam Province
- Pelleh Hava, Lorestan Province
