= Pella (disambiguation) =

Pella was the capital of Macedon since the 4th century BC

Pella also refers to:

== Places ==
=== Greece ===
==== Central Macedonia ====
- Pella (town), town in Macedonia, Greece, near the site of ancient Pella
- Pella (municipality), municipality in the Pella regional unit, Greece
- Pella (regional unit), administrative unit in Macedonia, Greece
- Pella (constituency), electoral district
- Nea Pella, a village in Macedonia, Greece, close to Pella

==== Thessaly ====
- Pella (Thessaly), town of ancient Thessaly, Greece

=== Africa ===
- Pella, Burkina Faso, city
- Pella, Northern Cape, town in South Africa

=== Italy ===
- Pella, Piedmont, municipality in the Province of Novara

=== Middle East ===
==== Jordan ====
- Pella, Jordan, ancient city in Jordan
  - Diocese of Pella

==== Judaea ====
- Pella, name of town and toparchy in Roman Judaea, usually identified with Bayt Nattif

==== Syria ====
- Apamea (Syria), called Pella during the Seleucid rule

=== USA ===
- Pella, Iowa, city in the United States
- Pella, Wisconsin, town in the United States
  - Pella (CDP), Wisconsin, census-designated place in the town

== People ==
- Catalina Pella (born 1993), Argentine female tennis player, sister of Guido
- Giuseppe Pella (18 April 1902 – 31 May 1981), Prime Minister of Italy, 1953-4
- Guido Pella (born 1990), Argentine male tennis player, brother of Catalina
- Vespasian Pella (4/17 January 1897 – 24 August 1960), Romanian jurist

== Fictional characters ==
- Aka Pella, a character from the animated series Histeria!

== Other uses ==
- Pella curse tablet, a magic spell, written in Doric Greek
- Pella Palace, residence of Catherine the Great near St. Petersburg
- Pella Square, a main square in Skopje, North Macedonia
- Pella (company), manufacturer of windows and doors
- Pella (beetle), a genus of rove beetle
- JSC Leningrad Shipyard Pella, producer of the Raptor-class patrol boat

== See also ==
- Pela (disambiguation)
- Aegae (Macedonia)
