= Embarrass River (Wisconsin) =

River in Wisconsin, United States

Coordinates: 44°23′32″N 88°44′11″W

The Embarrass River is a 62.0-mile-long (99.8 km) tributary of the Wolf River in the U.S. state of Wisconsin.

The Embarrass River has three branches. The South Branch is 35.1 miles (56.5 km) long, originates near Eland and passes by Tigerton. The 50.0-mile-long (80.5 km) Middle Branch originates in southern Langlade County, and the 34.8-mile-long (56.0 km) northern branch passes by Bowler, Tilleda and Leopolis. The Middle and South Branch converge in Caroline, and the river collects its North Branch 4 miles (6 km) east of there, then flows through Pella, where a dam is located. Below Pella, the Embarrass River passes by the village of Embarrass. The Embarrass River eventually flows into the Wolf River in the city of New London. "French voyageurs named this river the Embarrass, French for obstruction, because, while canoeing down the stream, they frequently found their passage blocked by fallen logs."

== Sport ==
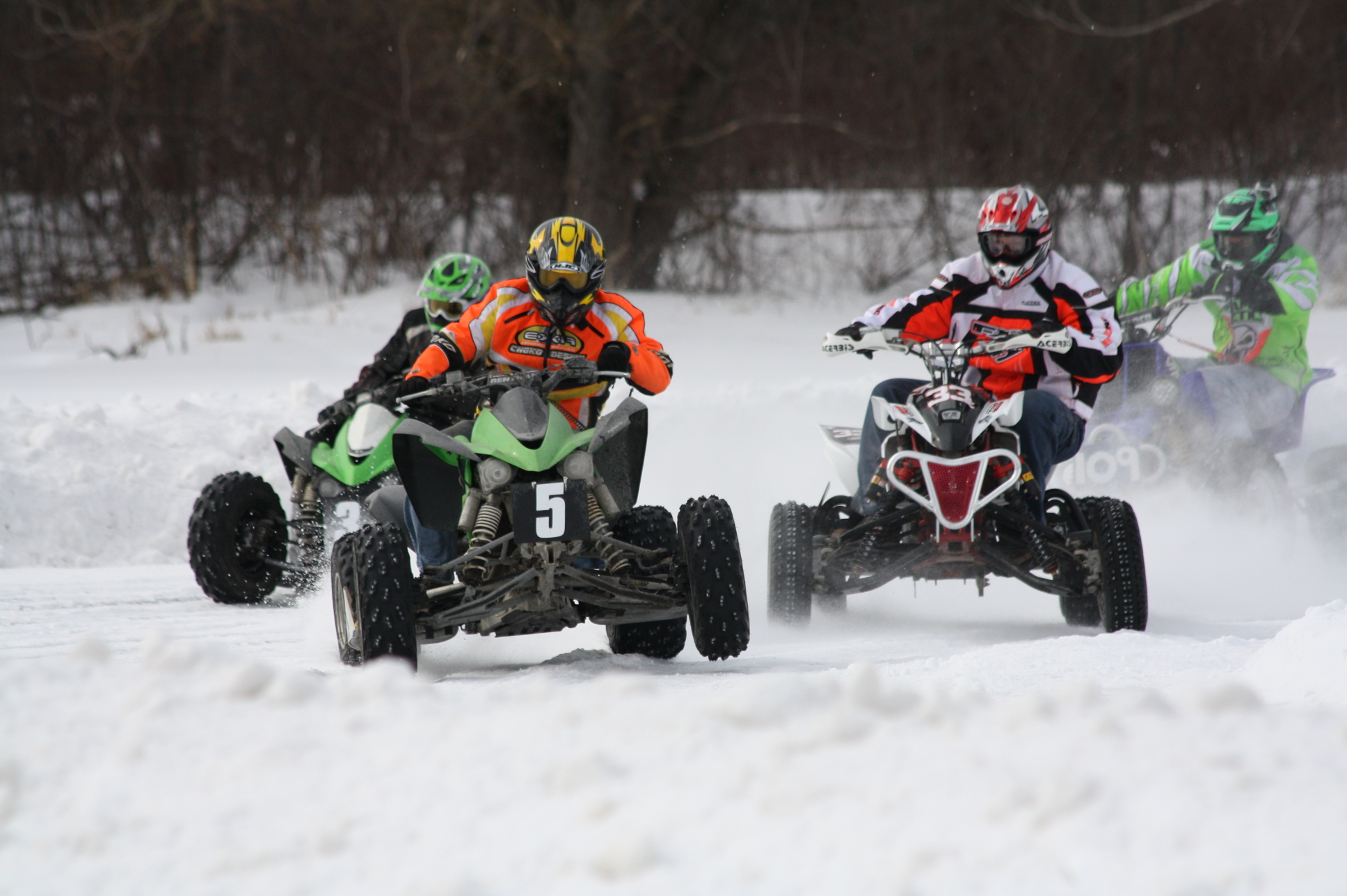
Ice racing quads at Tilleda

While frozen, the river is used for ice racing tracks in Tilleda and Caroline. The frozen river is also used for ice fishing.
