= Pelia =

Pelia may refer to:

- Pelpa or Pelīā, a village in Iran
- Pelia, a Greek mythological figure
- Pelia (crab), a genus of spider crabs in subfamily Pisinae of Epialtidae
- Peria (butterfly) or Pelia, a genus in subfamily Biblidinae of nymphalid butterflies
- Pelia, a character in the Star Trek: Strange New Worlds portrayed by Carol Kane

== See also ==
- Pella (disambiguation)
