= Herman, Wisconsin =

Herman is the name of some places in the U.S. state of Wisconsin:

- Herman, Dodge County, Wisconsin, a town
- Herman, Shawano County, Wisconsin, a town
- Herman, Sheboygan County, Wisconsin, a town
- Herman Center, Wisconsin, an unincorporated community
