= Pelas =

Pelas may also refer to:

- Lindsey Pelas (born 1991), American model and actress
- Palas, Iran, a village

== See also ==
- Pela (disambiguation)
