= Lyndhurst, Wisconsin =

- Unincorporated community
- Location within Wisconsin Location within the United States
- Coordinates: 44°50′31″N 88°48′45″W
- Country: United States
- State: Wisconsin
- County: Shawano
- Elevation: 951 ft (290 m)
- Time zone: UTC-6 (Central (CST))
  - Summer (DST): UTC-5 (CDT)
- Area codes: 715 & 534
- GNIS feature ID: 1568840

Lyndhurst is an unincorporated community located in the town of Herman, Shawano County, Wisconsin, United States. Lyndhurst is 1.5 miles (2.4 km) southwest of Gresham. The Mountain-Bay State Trail runs through Lyndhurst.
