= USS Suamico =

Oiler of the United States Navy

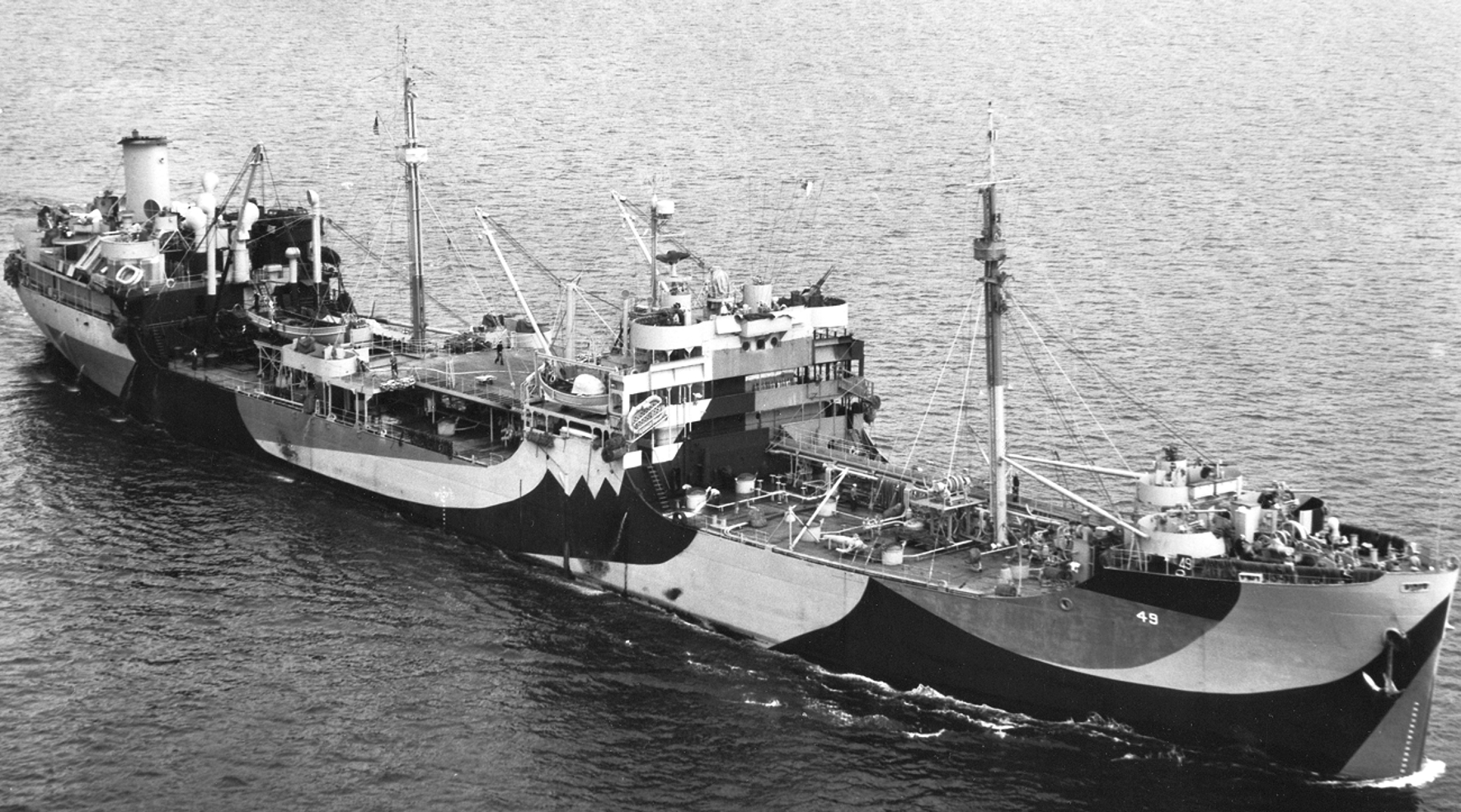

History

United States
- Name: USS Suamico
- Namesake: Suamico River in Wisconsin
- Builder: Sun Shipbuilding & Drydock Co., Chester, Pennsylvania
- Laid down: 27 September 1941
- Launched: 30 May 1942
- Acquired: 27 June 1942
- Commissioned: 10 August 1942
- Decommissioned: 20 January 1946
- In service: 1 October 1949, as USNS Suamico (T-AO-49)
- Out of service: date unknown
- Stricken: 15 November 1974
- Honors and awards: 8 battle stars (World War II)
- Fate: Sold for scrapping, 22 January 1975

General characteristics
- Type: Suamico-class fleet replenishment oiler
- Displacement: 5,782 long tons (5,875 t) light; 21,880 long tons (22,231 t) full
- Length: 523 ft 6 in (159.56 m)
- Beam: 68 ft (21 m)
- Draft: 30 ft (9.1 m)
- Propulsion: Turbo-electric, single screw, 8,000 hp (5,966 kW)
- Speed: 15.5 knots (28.7 km/h; 17.8 mph)
- Capacity: 140,000 barrels (22,000 m^{3})
- Complement: 251
- Armament: 1 × 5"/38 caliber guns; 4 × 3"/50 caliber guns; 4 × twin 40 mm AA guns; 4 × twin 20 mm AA guns

USS Suamico (AO-49) was the lead ship of her class of Type T2-SE-A1 fleet oilers of the United States Navy.

The ship was laid down as the SS Harlem Heights under Maritime Commission contract (MC hull 319) on 27 September 1941 by the Sun Shipbuilding & Drydock Co. of Chester, Pennsylvania. Launched on 30 May 1942; sponsored by Mrs. W. Potter; she was delivered to the Navy on 27 June 1942; converted to a fleet oiler at Brooklyn, New York, by the Bethlehem Steel Co.; and commissioned as USS Suamico (AO-49), on 10 August 1942.

== Service history ==
=== 1942 ===
Suamico completed her fitting-out at Norfolk. She departed Hampton Roads on 28 September and, after sailing via Aruba off Venezuela, she transited the Panama Canal. After liberty in Panama City, the oiler continued her voyage. She arrived in Nouméa, New Caledonia, late in November and then shifted to Suva Harbor, Fiji, in early December to unload her liquid cargo. She departed Suva on the 7th and, later that month, arrived in San Pedro, California.

=== 1943 ===
Suamico made another round-trip voyage from San Pedro to the South Pacific in January 1943; then returned to New Caledonia in mid-February. In mid-March, she sailed for the Solomon Islands to deliver aviation gasoline to Henderson Field on Guadalcanal. On the 17th, she moved to the anchorage at Tulagi, where she off-loaded PT boats. On 19 March, while steaming in company with the destroyer Balch (DD-363), the oiler received her baptism of fire. At 1130, a Japanese medium bomber came in high out of the sun and dropped three bombs. Suamico sustained some shrapnel damage, but the bombs — all three near misses — did no serious damage. She opened fire on the enemy aircraft, but altitude protected him. The bomber returned, dropped two more near misses; then turned and ran. An hour and one-half later, Balch picked up a sonar contact; but, after a six-depth charge barrage, the contact disappeared from the screen.

In March, Suamico made a round-trip voyage from Espiritu Santo to New Caledonia and back; then, in late April, she got underway for San Francisco where she underwent repairs until mid-May. Between 19 May and 22 July, the oiler made two voyages between the west coast and Hawaii. At the end of July, she shifted from San Francisco to Los Angeles, loaded aircraft, and sailed for New Zealand. She arrived at Auckland on 22 August; then moved on to Wilmington Harbor, New Zealand, where she unloaded some of her cargo on the 27th. On 3 September, she off-loaded the aircraft at New Caledonia. Suamico returned to San Pedro, California, on 21 September. On 5 October, she departed the west coast and, seven days later, entered Pearl Harbor, where she refueled the carrier Lexington (CV-16).

She set sail again on 10 November and joined Task Force 52 for the invasion of the Gilbert Islands. On 16 November, she fueled ships at sea. The next day, she was en route to the Fiji Islands where she arrived on the 21st. Fueling at sea followed in the vicinity of the Gilbert Islands; and, on 9 December, she returned to Funafuti and cast off for Pearl Harbor where she arrived on the 20th. By the end of the year, she was in San Diego for repairs and overhaul at the Destroyer Base.

=== 1944 ===
On 18 January 1944, the oiler sailed for Pearl Harbor where she arrived on the 21st. Leaving the next day, she joined Task Force 52 for the invasion of the Marshall Islands. She fueled the ships in this task force on the 26th; and, on 1 February, was en route to Majuro in the Marshalls.

On the first day of the occupation of Majuro, Suamico entered the harbor in the heart of the Marshall Islands. She got underway on the 5th for Roi Island, where she anchored on the following day. On 10 February, she steamed to Kwajalein Island where she arrived on the 11th, but was detained several hours before entering the harbor by a submarine contact. On 12 February, all hands went to general quarters as condition red prevailed during enemy air attacks on Roi, located at the northern tip of the lagoon. She remained at Kwajalein for four days, joined Task Group 51.5, and entered Majuro anchorage once more on the 17th. On 25 February, all her cargo and stores were discharged for the voyage to Pearl Harbor; but the Pearl Harbor orders were cancelled; and Suamico departed on 2 March for the New Hebrides.

Suamico entered Segond Channel at Espiritu Santo on 7 March and remained there until shifting to Pallikula Bay on the 21st to be topped off. By 22 March she was underway to a fueling area in the vicinity of New Ireland. On 26 March, she fueled warships to the east of New Ireland. On 30 March, she returned to Pallikula Bay and remained there through the end of April.

On 3 May, Suamico got underway for the Marshalls. She anchored at Majuro on the 7th. She operated in the Marshalls until getting underway on 19 June for fueling at sea operations. The 23 June found her within sight of Saipan, where the landings were proceeding. At noon, while she was fueling the battleship Pennsylvania (BB-38), two Japanese suicide dive bombers attacked the escort carrier Manila Bay (CVE-61) about 2,000 yards off the oiler's stern. The enemy peppered the carrier with bombs and water shot skyward. The steady fire from the American ships, however, forced the Japanese to retire.

On 29 June, she anchored in Garapan Anchorage, Saipan, and fueled ships in the harbor. Later that day, Suamico put to sea to avoid night kamikaze attacks and returned to the anchorage the following morning. On 30 June, she was at sea again, circling Tinian and Saipan; then returned to Garapan Anchorage the following day. At midnight on 2 July, general quarters brought all hands to battle stations, but the enemy aircraft bypassed the darkened ships and concentrated on the troops ashore. Heavy fighting and many fires were visible ashore as brilliant flashes of red and white lit up the midnight blackness.

Leaving Saipan on 2 July, she steamed towards Eniwetok and arrived there on 5 July. On the 22nd, she got underway for the California coast, visited Pearl Harbor on 29 and 30 July, and arrived at San Pedro on 5 August.

On 20 September, following repairs in drydock, she headed toward Pearl Harbor, where she moored alongside the oil pier seven days later. On 2 October, she got underway and, the following day, searched for an aircraft believed to be lost in the vicinity. Ten days later, she passed Massen Island and, on 14 October, she anchored in Seeadler Harbor at Manus.

The following day, she headed for New Guinea and arrived at Hollandia on the 16th. After two days at anchor, she put to sea for fueling operations and thence proceeded to the Philippines. On the 24th, Suamico entered Leyte Gulf where she fueled ships of the fleet. The oiler remained in the gulf for four days. During that time, she went through frequent air raids, but suffered no battle damage. Her closest scrape came on 26 October, when a Japanese torpedo bomber swept in low over the water and barely cleared Suamico's stack. On 28 October, she sought refuge at Kossol Passage in the Palau Islands, but put to sea again that evening when a supposed enemy task force did not materialize. On 7 November, she anchored in San Pedro Bay for three days before heading back to Hollandia. She arrived there on the 14th, fueled the ships in the harbor, and made short shuttles to Tanahmerah Bay and out to sea for gunnery practice until late December. On the 28th, she got underway to return to San Pedro Bay, Leyte, where she arrived on New Year's Day, 1945.

=== 1945 ===
Two days later, she negotiated the Surigao Strait, crossed the Mindanao Sea, rounded the southern end of Negros, and headed north to support the Lingayen invasion. There were many tense moments because the Japanese were expected to launch land-based torpedo bombers across the narrow straits, but this fear proved groundless. On the afternoon of the 4th, however, Ommaney Bay (CVE-79) was struck by a Japanese suicide aircraft. The escort aircraft carrier burst into flames about 2,000 yards from Suamico and was later abandoned and sunk by American destroyers.

The following day, she left Task Unit 77.10.3 off Mindoro Island and headed into Mangarin Bay. Her entry into the harbor was delayed while the shore installations at Mindoro fought off an enemy air attack. However, Suamico was not to be left out of the encounter, for she fired on an enemy aircraft directly overhead and frightened him away. He dropped a mine directly in front of the oiler just before fleeing, but it drifted by harmlessly.

She was at sea again on 6 January, off the coast of Mindoro. On the 7th, while fueling ships at sea, Suamico and her sister ship Pecos (AO-65) were attacked by a Japanese A6M Zero. The aircraft came in directly out of the sun, swooped low over Pecos, and dropped a bomb astern of that oiler as he started his run on Suamico. All her guns opened up simultaneously. The "Zeke" came in at masthead height, slightly to starboard astern, and then, curving to port, ran smack into Suamico's curtain of anti-aircraft fire. The aircraft surged upward and then plunged toward the sea. It rolled twice and crashed into the water about a hundred yards from the oiler.

On 8 January, she anchored during the day in Mangarin Bay, put to sea again that night for evasive action, and returned to the anchorage again the next morning.

On 10 January, a voluntary fire-fighting party from the USS Suamico boarded the USS Porcupine which had been set aflame by enemy action and was a menace to the safety of the ships in the harbor. Many of the volunteers were killed when on board as the ship further erupted in flames. Survivors received citations for their bravery under extremely hazardous conditions.

On 30 January, Suamico returned to Leyte Gulf. The first day of February found her underway for the Carolines, and she anchored at Ulithi on the 5th. After remaining there for eleven days, she got underway for the Volcano Islands. On the day the American flag was raised on Iwo Jima, the officers and crew of Suamico viewed the historic scene from just off shore. On 21 February, the ship went to general quarters twice to beat off an air attack. The next day, the Suamico fueled ships off Iwo Jima.

On the 23rd and 24th, she got underway for Ulithi and anchored in the lagoon on 28 February. On 4 March, she headed back toward the Philippines and she reached San Pedro Bay two days later. She remained there until the 23rd; then got underway for Ulithi. On 1 April, she cleared Ulithi for the invasion of the Ryukyus. By 23 April, she was anchored at Kerama Retto, near Okinawa. On 2 May, she headed for Ulithi Atoll and arrived on the 7th. She took on stores and operated at sea with the replenishment group until 18 May, when she sailed back to Okinawa. On the 24th, she shifted to the anchorage at Kerama Retto; then rejoined the replenishment group on 27 May. On 1 June, she returned to the lagoon at Ulithi and, on the 9th, set sail for San Pedro Bay in the Philippines, arriving on 12 June.

On 13 June, while steaming toward the battleship Missouri (BB-63), she ran into a reef. With the aid of several tugs, she finally cleared the shoal and pulled alongside Missouri the next day. On 14 June she anchored in Leyte and spent the next fortnight fueling various warships. On the 29th, she departed Leyte and entered Ulithi three days later, departing again on the 10th. She reached Buckner Bay, Okinawa, on 14 July, but got underway the same day for fueling operations.

Returning on the 16th, she stood out to sea again on the 19th to evade a typhoon, returned on the 21st, and began fueling ships in port. On the 23rd, she got underway, joined convoy OKU 15, stopped at Ulithi on the 27th, and returned to Buckner Bay on 5 August. On the 11th, she got underway from Buckner Bay with a convoy. She arrived at Ulithi on 15 August, the day hostilities with Japan ended.

The oiler fueled and departed in company with convoy OKU 49 on 18 August. She returned to Buckner Bay on 22 August and remained there until 13 September when she sailed for Kōchi, Shikoku Island, Japan, to fuel a group of minesweepers. On the 16th, she entered Wakanoura Wan, Honshū, Japan. The next day, a typhoon boasting a wind of 88 knots (163 km/h; 101 mph) swept through the anchorage and caused her to drag anchor. She was forced to get underway to regain her anchorage. On 26 September, Suamico departed from Japan but was ordered to return to Wakayama two days later to avoid another typhoon. On the 30th, she reentered Wakayama, Japan.

On 1 October, Suamico departed Wakanoura Wan, Japan. She arrived in Buckner Bay on the 4th, anchored, and remained there until the 7th when she put to sea to avoid still another typhoon. She returned on the 11th, but got underway on the 13th to fuel the escort carrier Gilbert Islands (CVE-107) and the destroyer escort Kretchmer (DE-329) at sea. She returned to Buckner Bay on the evening of the 14th, received another load of oil, and then steamed towards Wakanoura Wan, where she anchored on the 17th. She fueled various ships in the harbor until the 31st. Sailing via Tokyo, Suamico headed back to the United States and arrived in San Francisco on 13 December.

=== 1946–1974 ===
The oiler was decommissioned on 20 January 1946 and turned over to the Maritime Commission on 4 October 1946.

On 24 January 1948, Suamico was reacquired by the Navy and simultaneously turned over to the American Pacific Steamship Co. to be operated under contract with the United States Naval Transport Service as USNS Suamico (T-AO-49).

Her operations carried her around the world, and she frequented ports in the Middle East and in the Far East. During the latter phases of the Korean War, she visited the coast of Korea, stopping twice at Pusan and once at Inchon. In the late 1950s, she operated frequently in the Caribbean Sea, while the intensification of the Vietnam War brought her back to the western Pacific in the mid-60s.

Suamico was struck from the Naval Vessel Register on 15 November 1974. The ship was returned to the Maritime Administration (MARAD) on 22 January 1975, and sold the same day to Fuji Marden & Co., Hong Kong, for scrapping. On 13 February 1975, the ship was delivered to a breakers yard at Yokohama, Japan.

== Awards ==
USS Suamico earned eight battle stars for World War II service.
