= Caroline, Wisconsin =

Census-designated place in Wisconsin, United States

Caroline
- Census-designated place
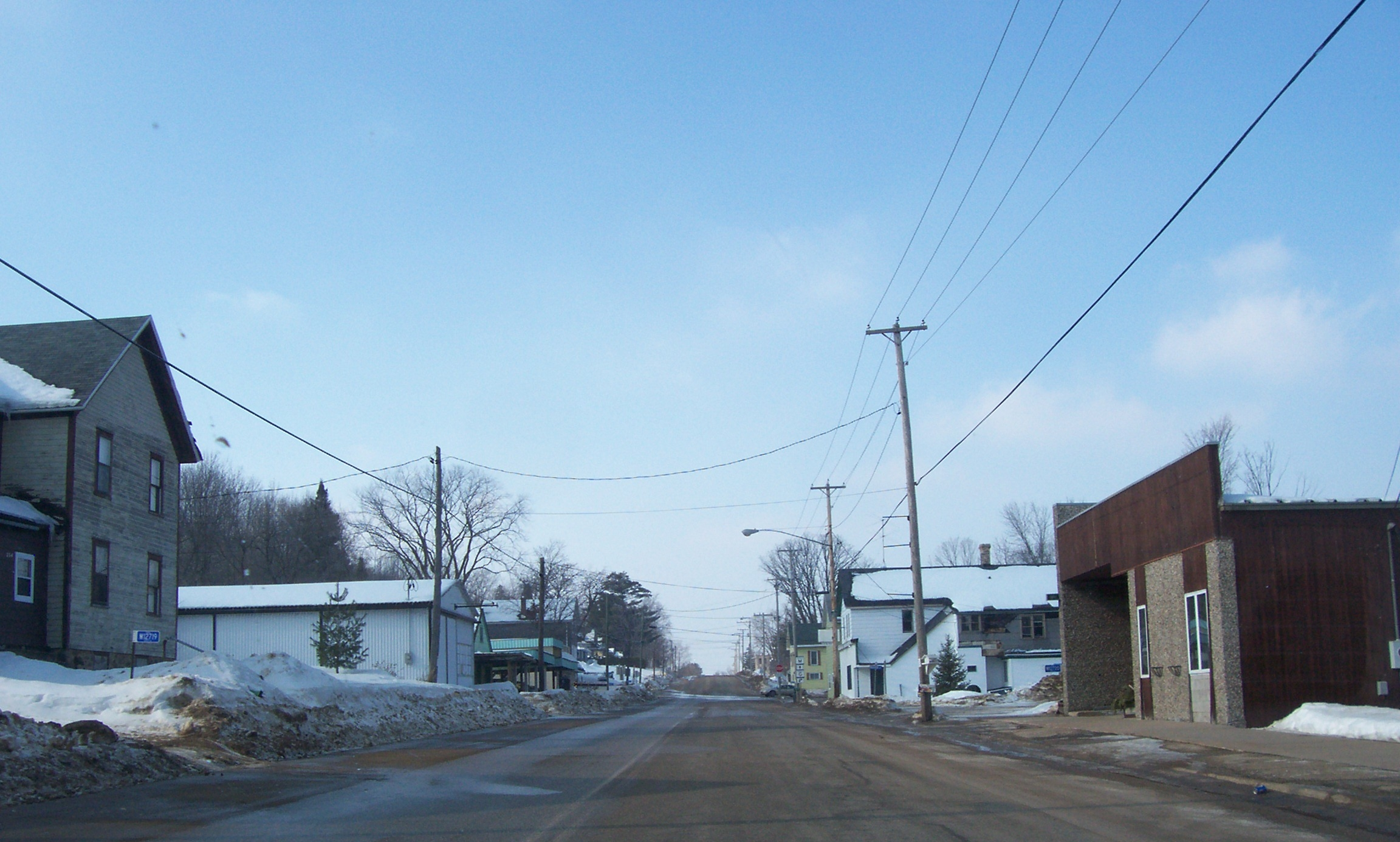
- Looking west at downtown Caroline

- Location within the state of Wisconsin
- Coordinates: 44°43′15″N 88°53′29″W
- Country: United States
- State: Wisconsin
- County: Shawano

Area
  - Total: 1.266 sq mi (3.28 km^{2})
  - Land: 1.186 sq mi (3.07 km^{2})
  - Water: 1.080 sq mi (2.80 km^{2})

Population (2020)
  - Total: 236
  - Density: 199/sq mi (76.8/km^{2})
- Time zone: UTC-6 (Central (CST))
  - Summer (DST): UTC-5 (CDT)

Caroline is an unincorporated census-designated place in the town of Grant in Shawano County, Wisconsin, United States. As of the 2020 census, its population is 236. The fire station for the town is located within the community. The community is located at the intersection of County Highways G & M between Marion and Tilleda. Caroline uses the ZIP code 54928. The Embarrass River passes through the community; it is used for ice racing.

Historical population
Census	Pop.	Note	%±
2010	270		—
2020	236		−12.6%
U.S. Decennial Census

== Images ==
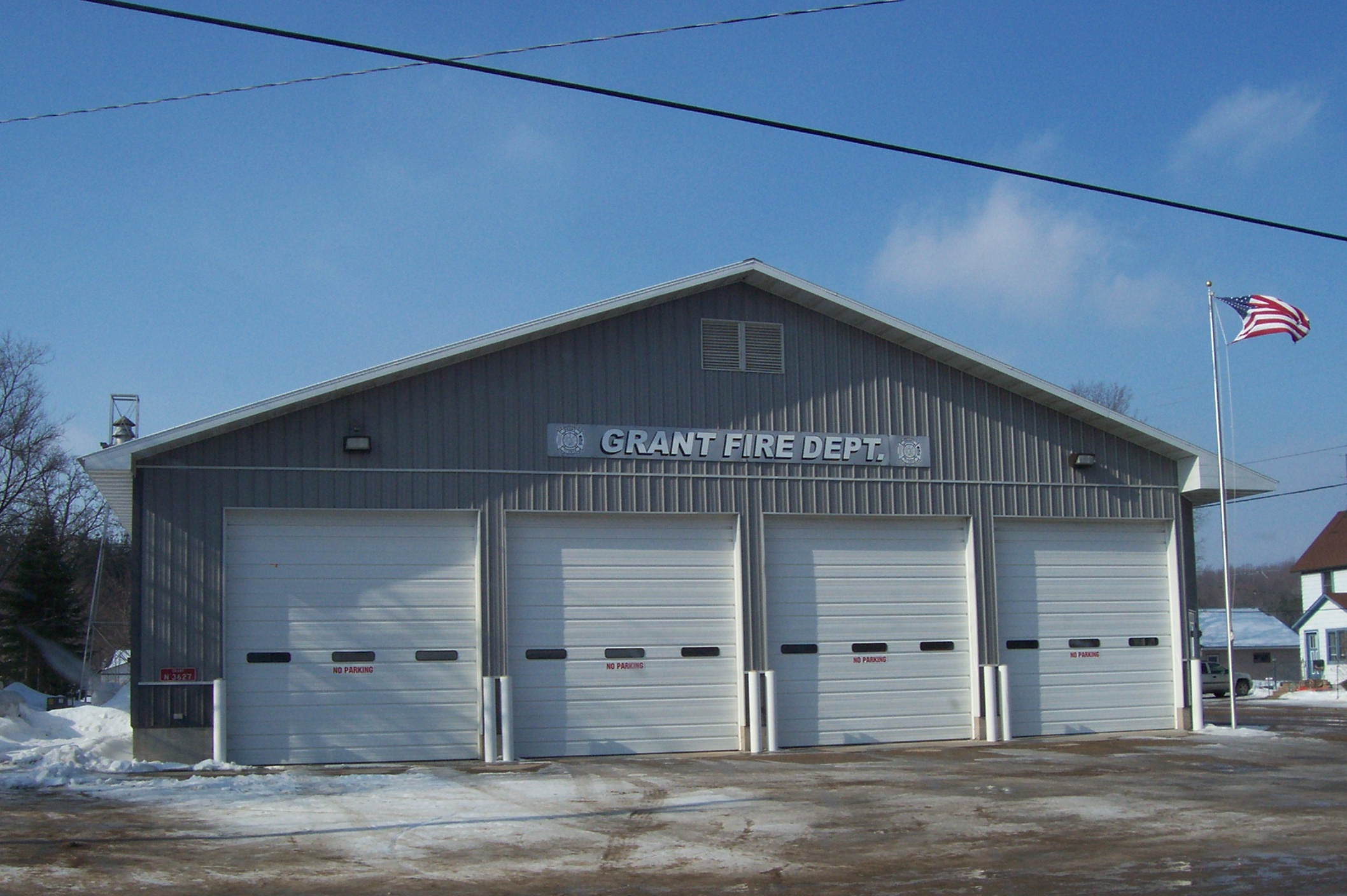
Grant fire station

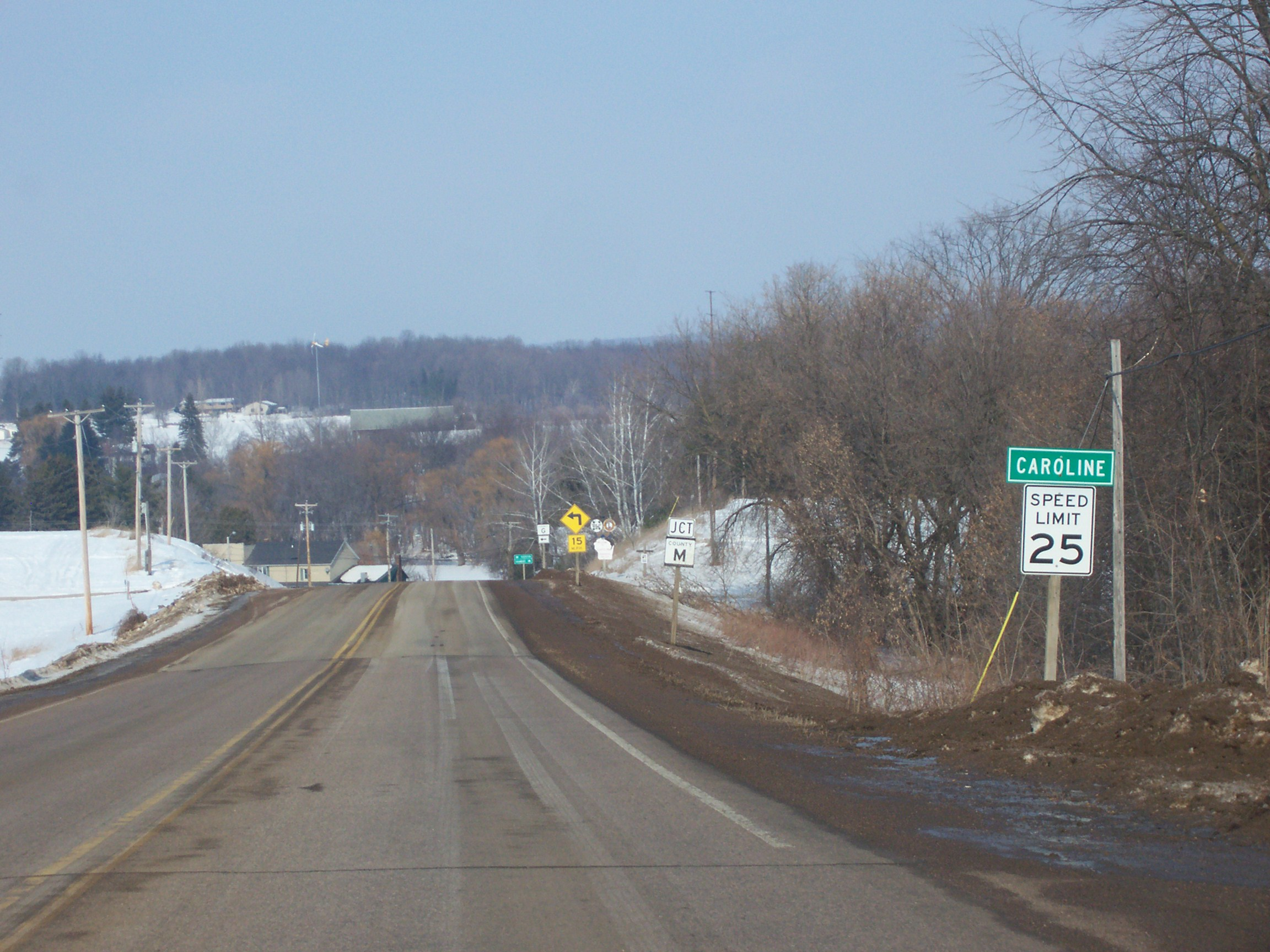
Looking north at the welcome sign

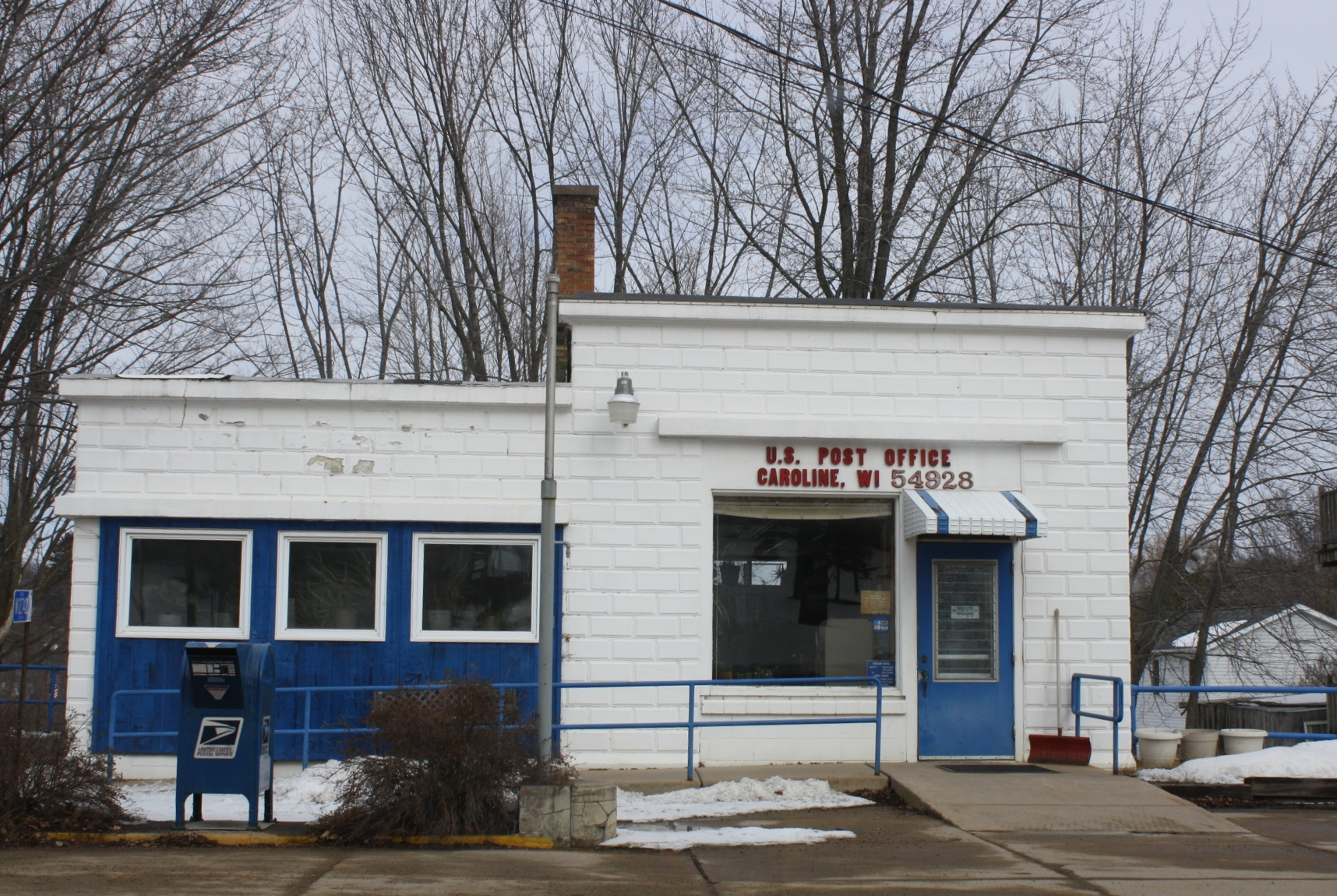
Post office

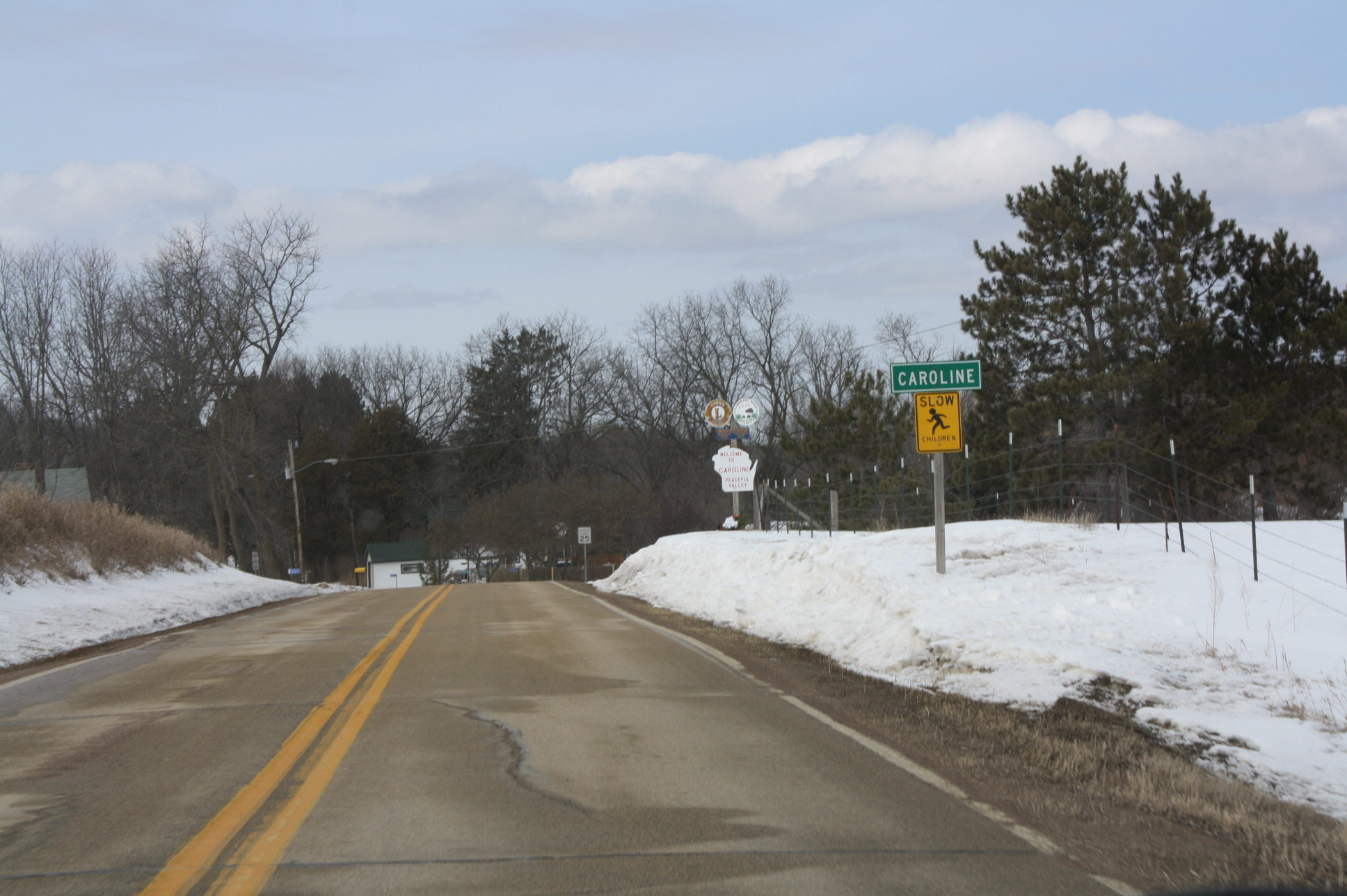
Entrance sign

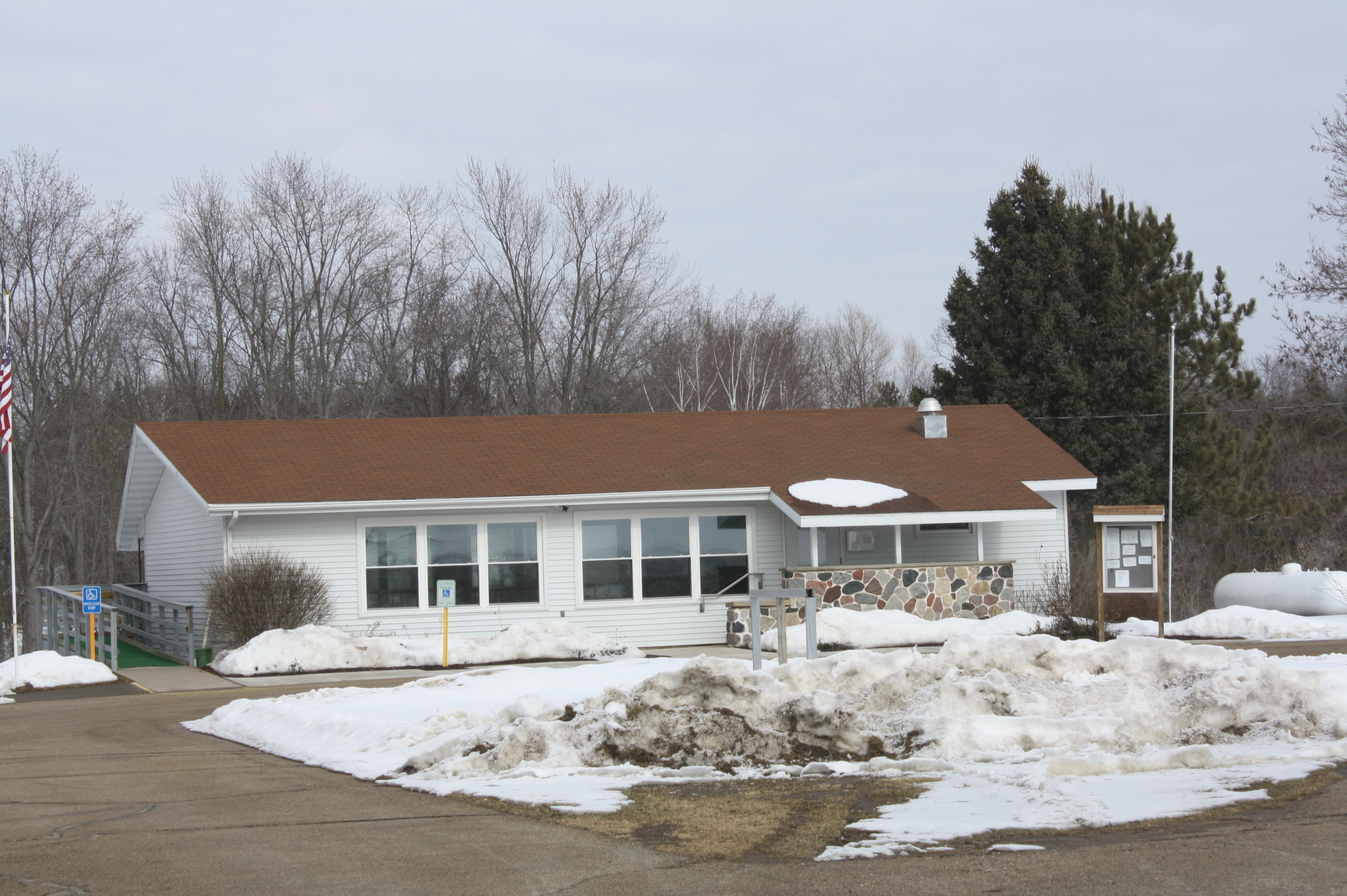
Grant town hall at edge of Caroline
