= Pela =

Pela may refer to:

- Pela (band), an American indie rock band
- Péla, a town and sub-prefecture in Guinea
- Péla (dish), a French dish
- Chinese wax, also known as pela
- Pela language, a language of southern China
- Mike Pela, British music producer
- Niccolò di Piero Lamberti (ca. 1370 – 1451), also known as il Pela, Italian sculptor and architect
- Pela, a playable character in Honkai: Star Rail
- PELA an abbreviation for Pelabresib

== See also ==
- Pelah (disambiguation)
- Pella (disambiguation)
- Pele (disambiguation)
