= Pella (CDP), Wisconsin =

Census-designated place in Wisconsin, United States

Pella, Wisconsin
- Census-designated place
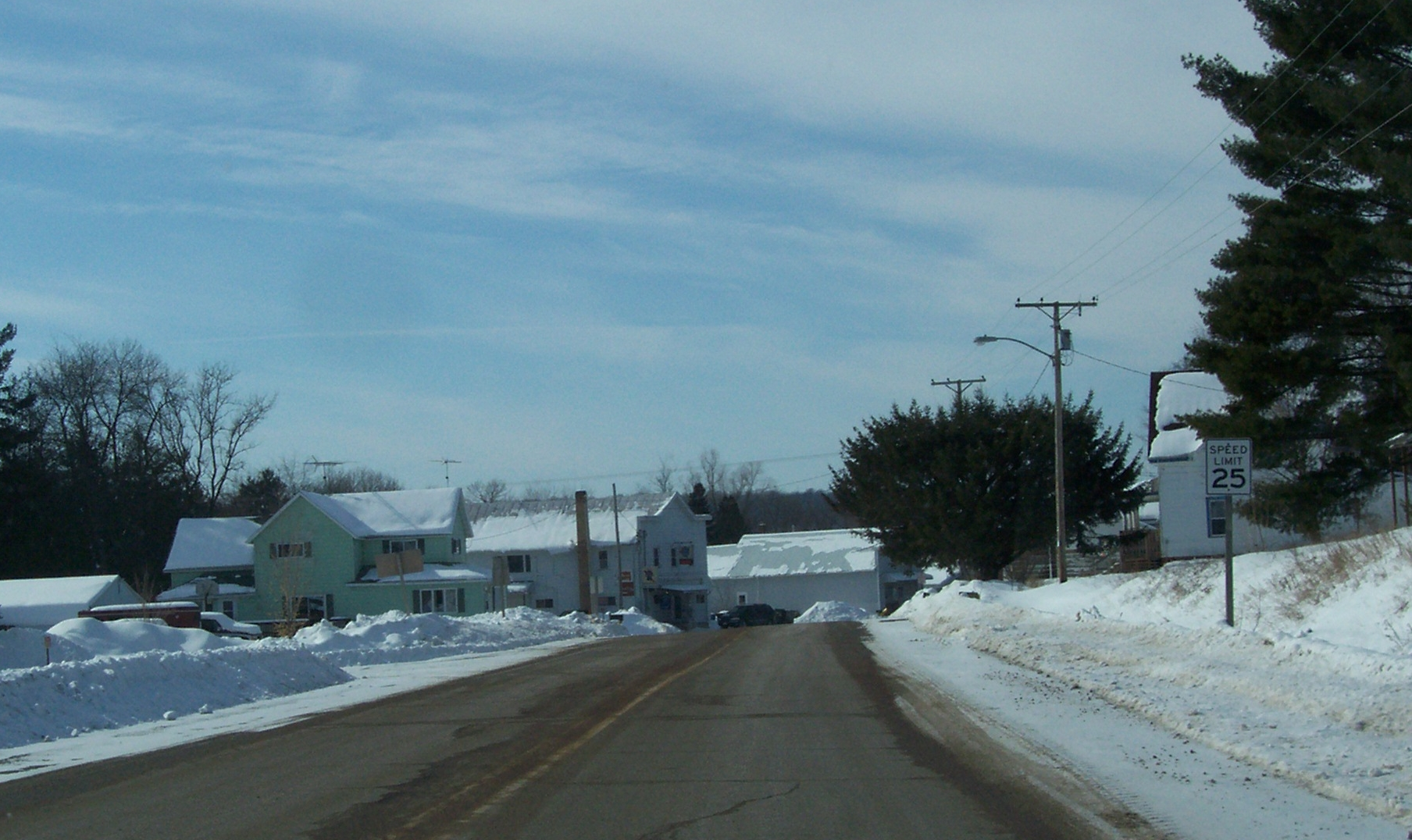
- Looking west

- Location within Wisconsin
- Coordinates: 44°44′33″N 88°48′12″W
- Country: United States
- State: Wisconsin
- County: Shawano

Area
  - Total: 1.719 sq mi (4.45 km^{2})
  - Land: 1.544 sq mi (4.00 km^{2})
  - Water: 0.175 sq mi (0.45 km^{2})
- Elevation: 869 ft (265 m)

Population (2020)
  - Total: 207
  - Density: 134/sq mi (51.8/km^{2})
- Time zone: UTC-6 (Central (CST))
  - Summer (DST): UTC-5 (CDT)
- Area codes: 715 & 534
- GNIS feature ID: 1571159

Pella is a census-designated place in the town of Pella, Shawano County, Wisconsin, United States. Its population was 207 as of the 2020 census. Pella is located along the Embarrass River.

Historical population
Census	Pop.	Note	%±
2010	185		—
2020	207		11.9%
U.S. Decennial Census

== Images ==
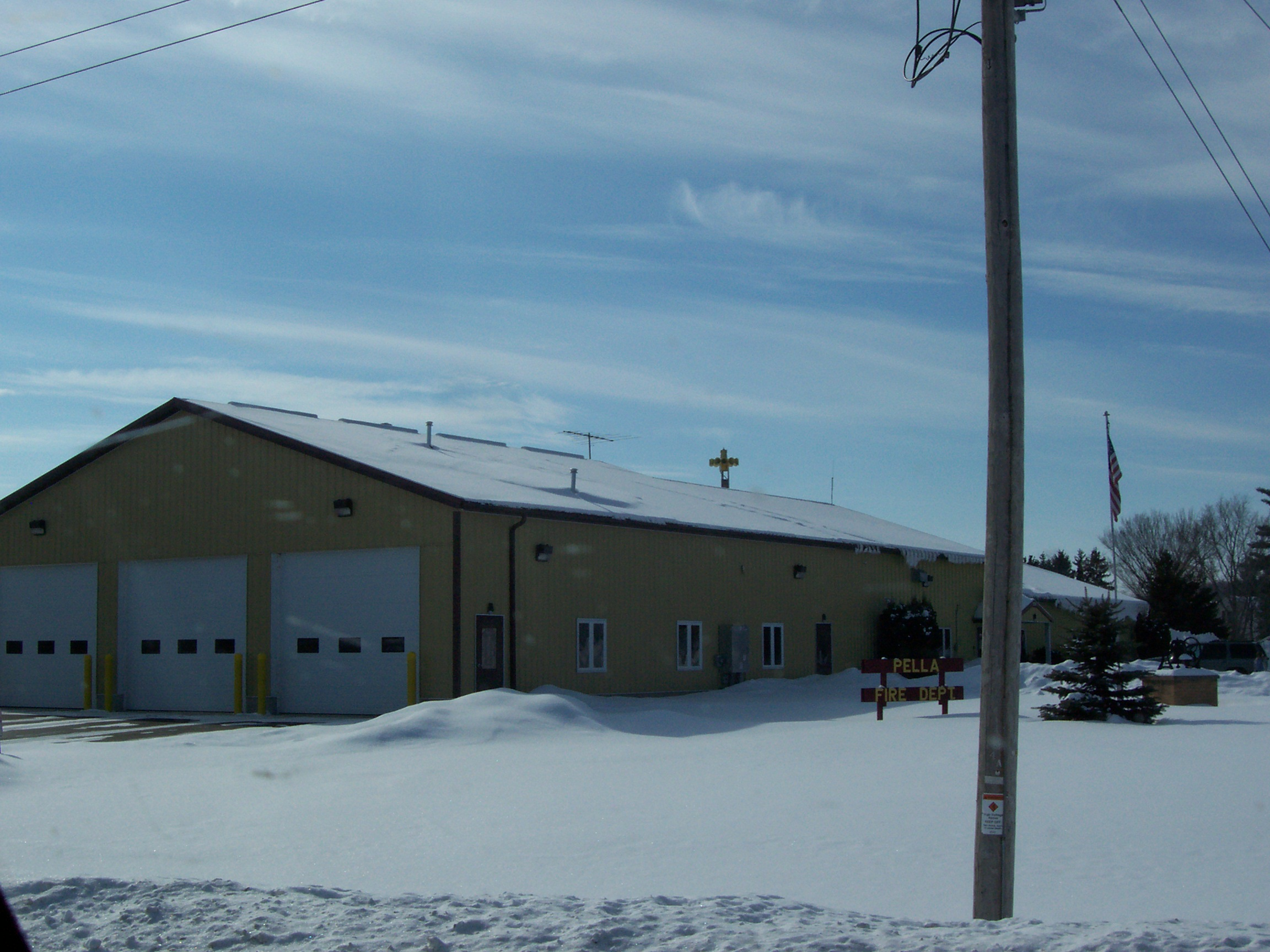
Pella fire department

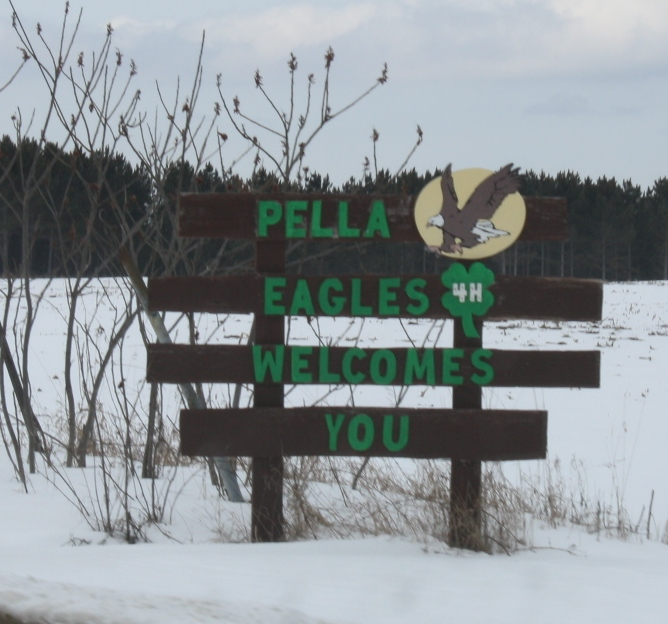
Welcome sign
