= Mountain-Bay State Trail =

Rail trail in Wisconsin, United States

Map

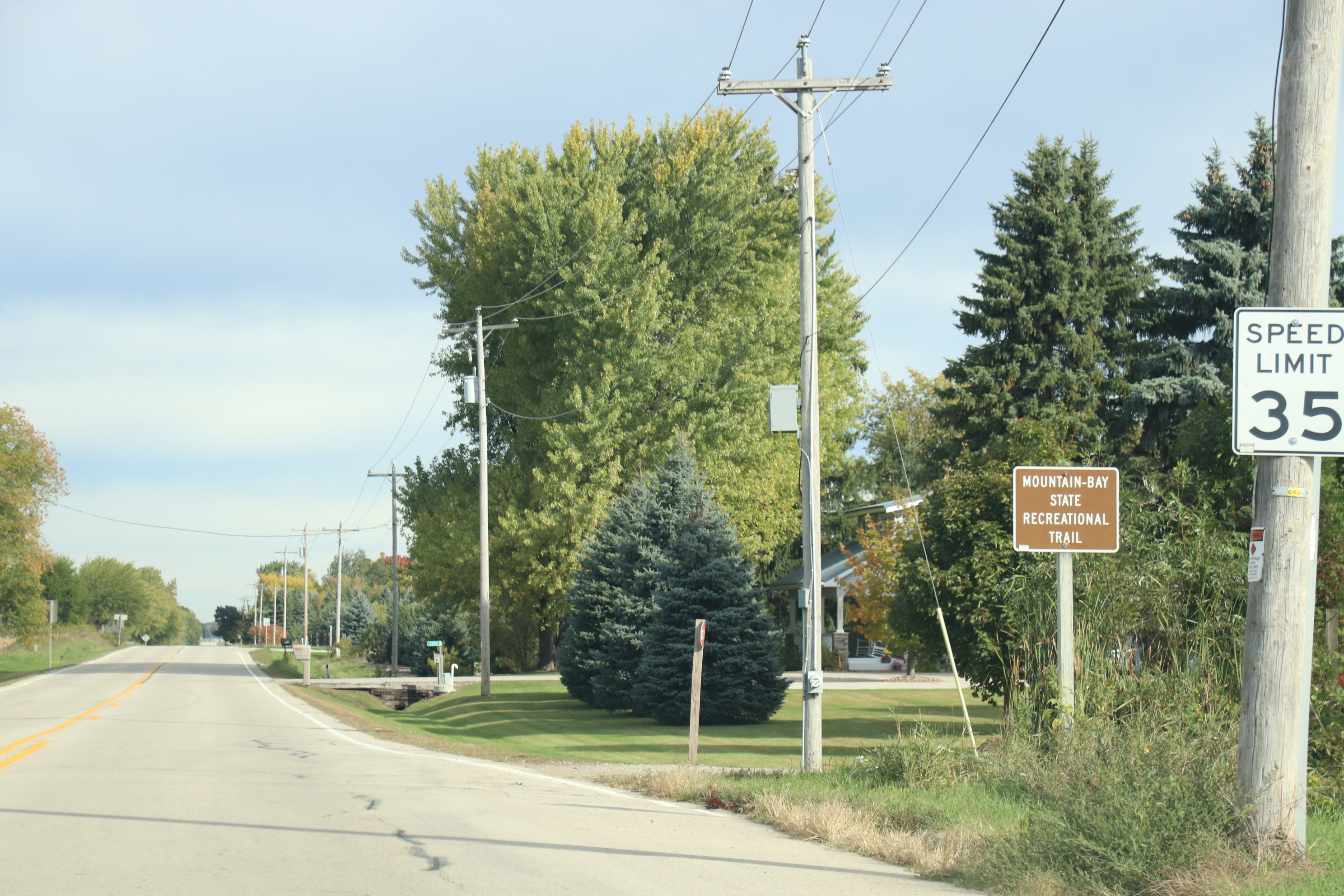
Sign in Anston

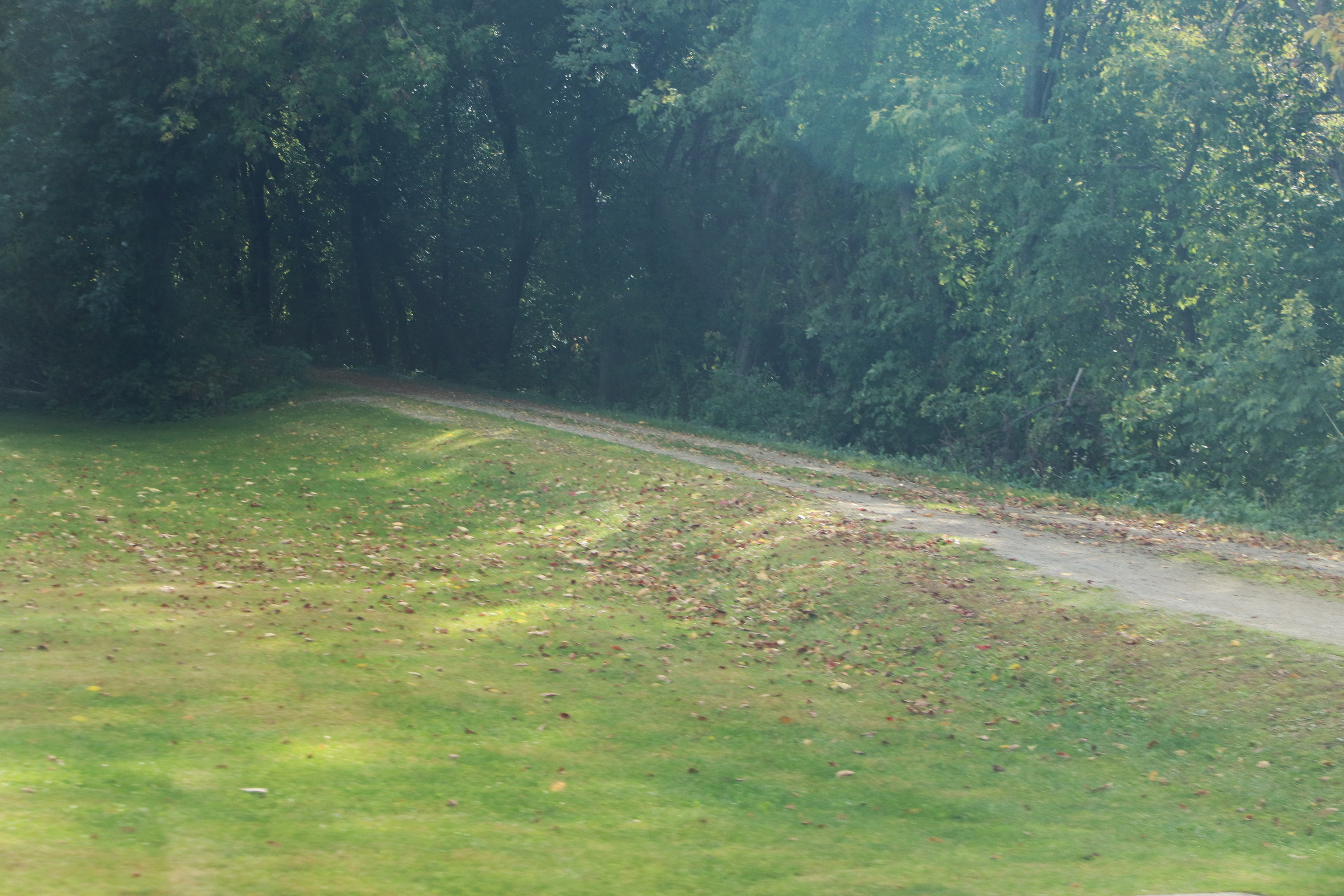
Trail in Anston

The Mountain-Bay State Trail is an 83-mile state-designated rail trail in Brown, Marathon, and Shawano Counties in Wisconsin. The trail is the longest rail trail in the state.

The trail is named for the two geological features at either end of the trail: Green Bay and Rib Mountain.

== Hotel ==
For much of the route, the trail roughly parallels Wisconsin Highway 29. The trail begins on Lakeview Dr. in Green Bay, Wisconsin (44°33′54″N 88°03′53″W), and travels northwest, where it ends in Weston, Wisconsin (44°54′25″N 89°33′06″W). There is a gap in the trail in Shawano, Wisconsin, where trail users must use local roads after crossing the Wolf River. The trail is 83 miles long, and is made of crushed stone.

== Access ==
The trail is open to walkers, joggers, bicyclists in the summer, and snowmobiling, cross-country skiing, and snowshoeing in the winter. Horseback riding is permitted in the Shawano County section, but not in the Brown or Marathon County sections.

The trail is free to walk or run, but a trail pass must be purchased in order to bike the trail, which may be purchased at several self-registration stations along the trail.

== History ==
The trail was first created in 1996. It uses an abandoned rail line from the Chicago and North Western Transportation Company.
