= Suamico River =

River in north east Wisconsin

Suamico River Big Suamico River
- Location within Wisconsin Location within the United States

Location
- Country: United States
- State: Wisconsin

Physical characteristics
- Source: Near Anston
  - coordinates: 44.624159°N 88.1792698°W
- Mouth: Green Bay
  - location: Near Suamico
  - coordinates: 44.6313814°N 88.0089932°W
  - elevation: 577 ft (176 m)

Basin features
- Tributaries
  - left: Potter Creek

The Suamico River is a river in north east Wisconsin that flows through the village of Suamico and into Green Bay in Lake Michigan. The source is near the community of Anston, in the town of Pittsfield. The river has been dredged by the United States Army Corps of Engineers to aid in recreational activity.

== See also ==
List of Wisconsin rivers
