= Pella (Thessaly) =

Town in ancient Thessaly, Greece

Pella or Pelle (Ancient Greek: Πέλλα or Πέλλη) was a town in ancient Thessaly. It is unlocated.
