= Pileh =

Pileh پيله
- Village
- Location within Iran
- Coordinates: 35°34′38″N 46°12′41″E
- Country: Iran
- Province: Kurdistan
- County: Marivan
- Bakhsh: Central
- Rural District: Sarkal

Population (2006)
  - Total: 273
- Time zone: UTC+3:30 (IRST)
  - Summer (DST): UTC+4:30 (IRDT)

Pileh (Persian: پيله, also Romanized as Pīleh and Paileh; also known as Pelah) is a village in Sarkal Rural District, in the Central District of Marivan County, Kurdistan Province, Iran. At the 2006 census, its population was 273, in 62 families. The village is populated by Kurds.
