= Tilleda, Wisconsin =

Census-designated place in Wisconsin, United States

Tilleda
- Census-designated place
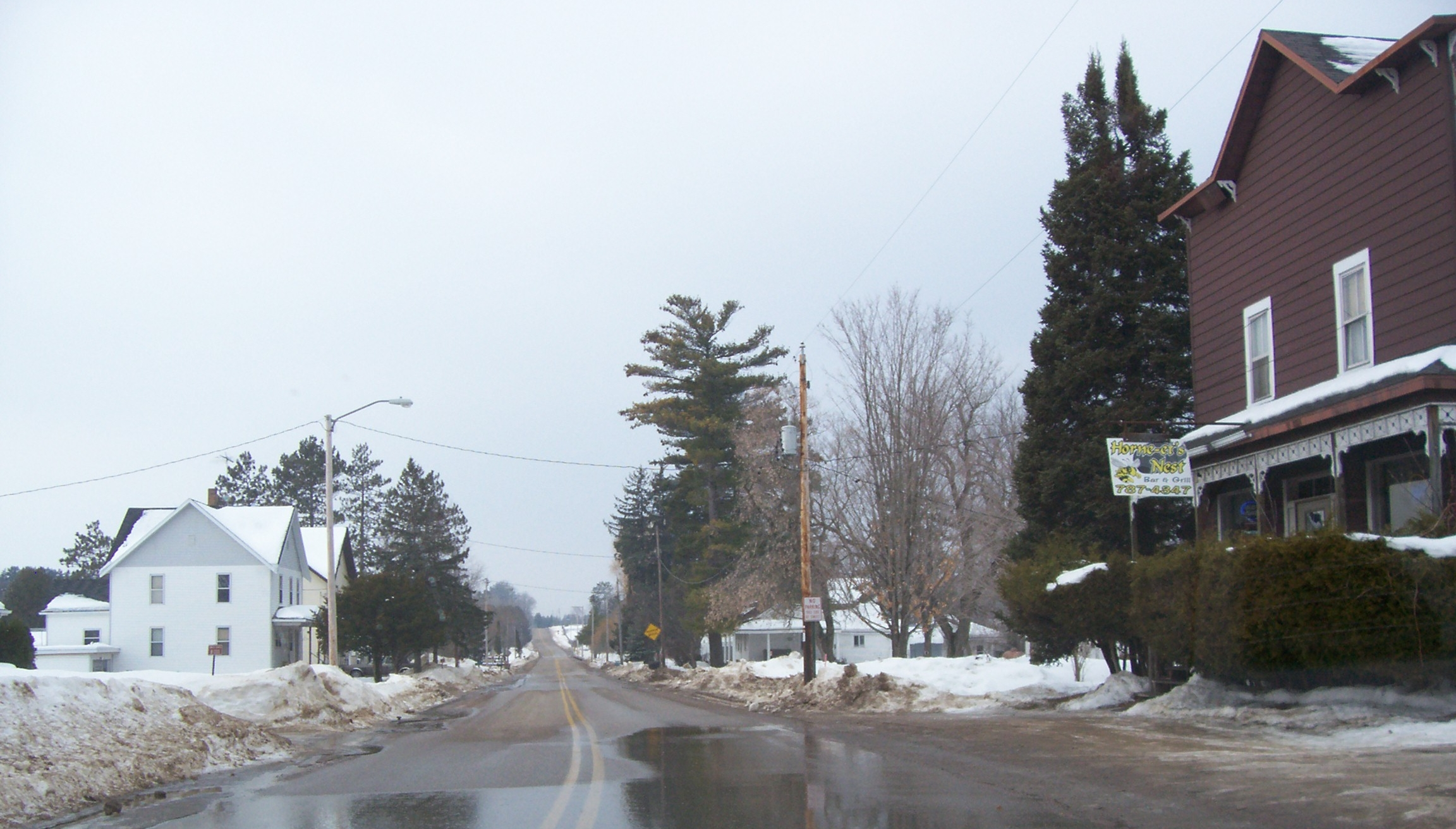
- Looking west at Tilleda

- Location within the state of Wisconsin
- Coordinates: 44°48′56″N 88°54′40″W
- Country: United States
- State: Wisconsin
- County: Shawano

Area
  - Total: 0.325 sq mi (0.84 km^{2})
  - Land: 0.281 sq mi (0.73 km^{2})
  - Water: 0.044 sq mi (0.11 km^{2})

Population (2020)
  - Total: 71
  - Density: 250/sq mi (98/km^{2})
- Time zone: UTC-6 (Central (CST))
  - Summer (DST): UTC-5 (CDT)

Tilleda is an unincorporated census-designated place in the town of Seneca in Shawano County, Wisconsin, United States. The community is located on County Highway D, less than one mile (one kilometer) north of Wisconsin Highway 29. The community uses the 54978 ZIP code. As of the 2020 census, Tilleda had a population of 71.

Tilleda Pond, on the Embarrass River is used for ice racing in January and February by the Tilleda Thunder program. Tilleda may have been founded by German immigrants from the village of Tilleda in central Germany.

Wolverine Fire Apparatus (blue buildings shown in pictures) is the largest employer in Tilleda.

== Images ==
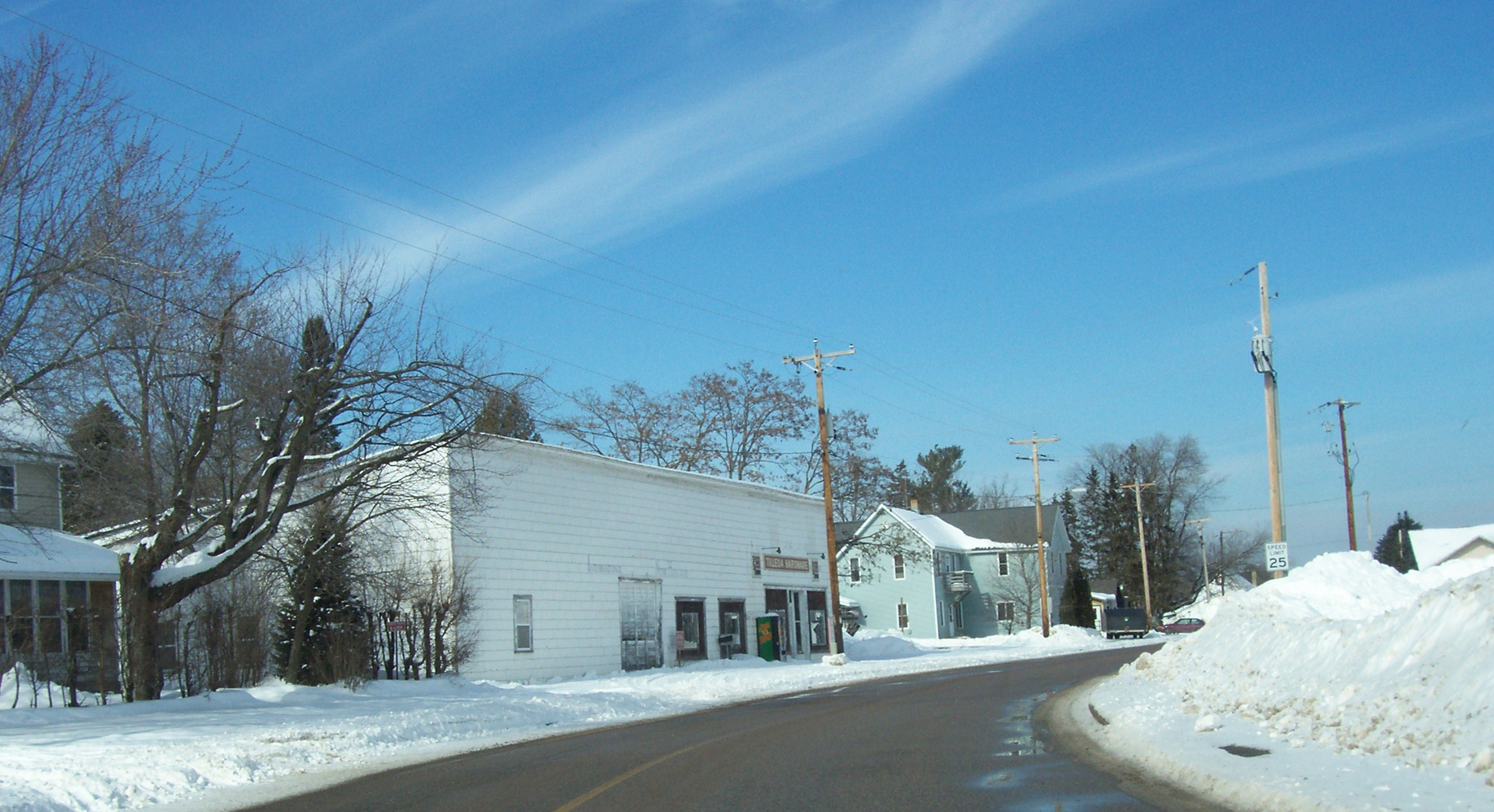
Looking north at Tilleda

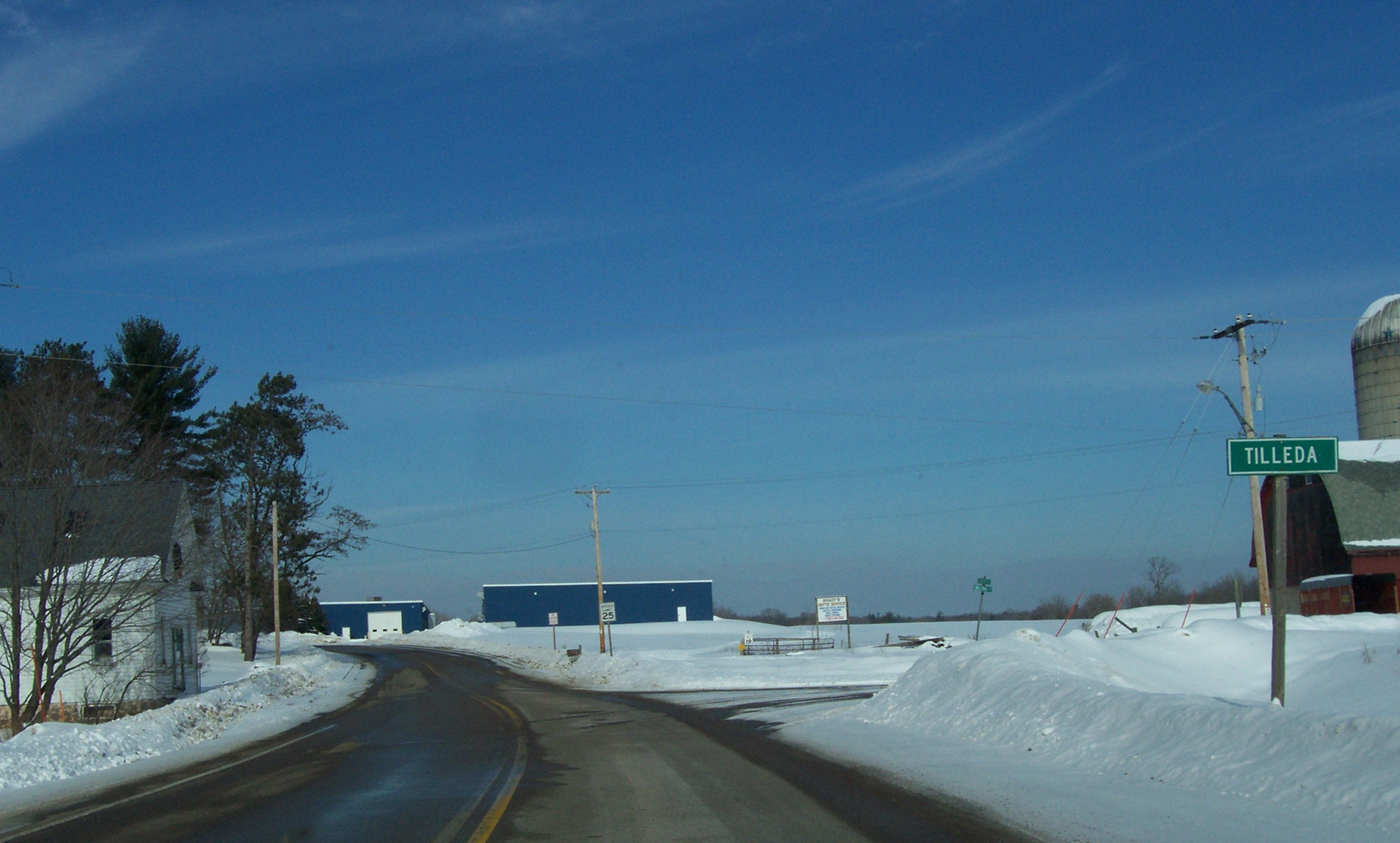
Looking north at the sign for Tilleda

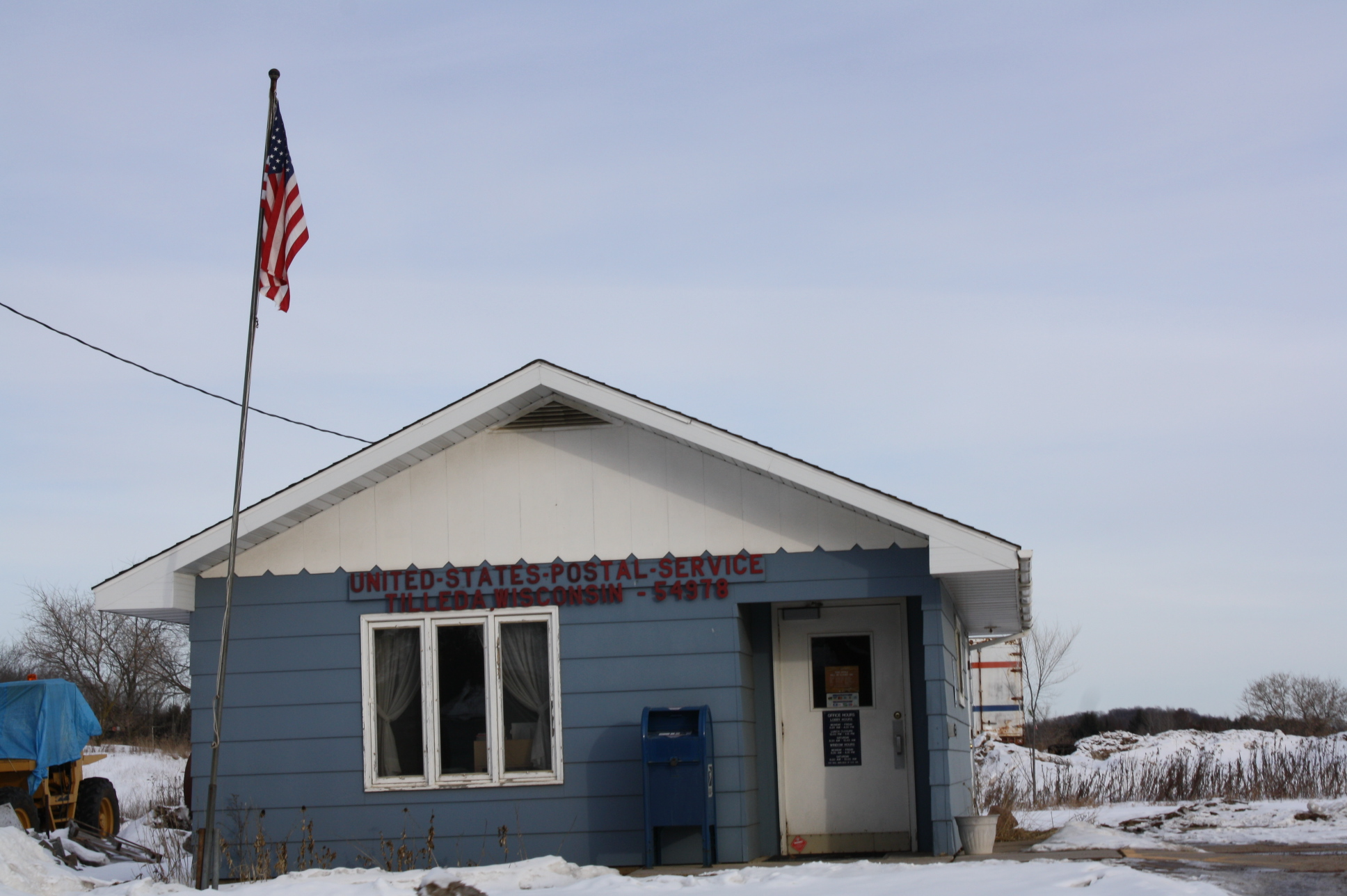
Post office

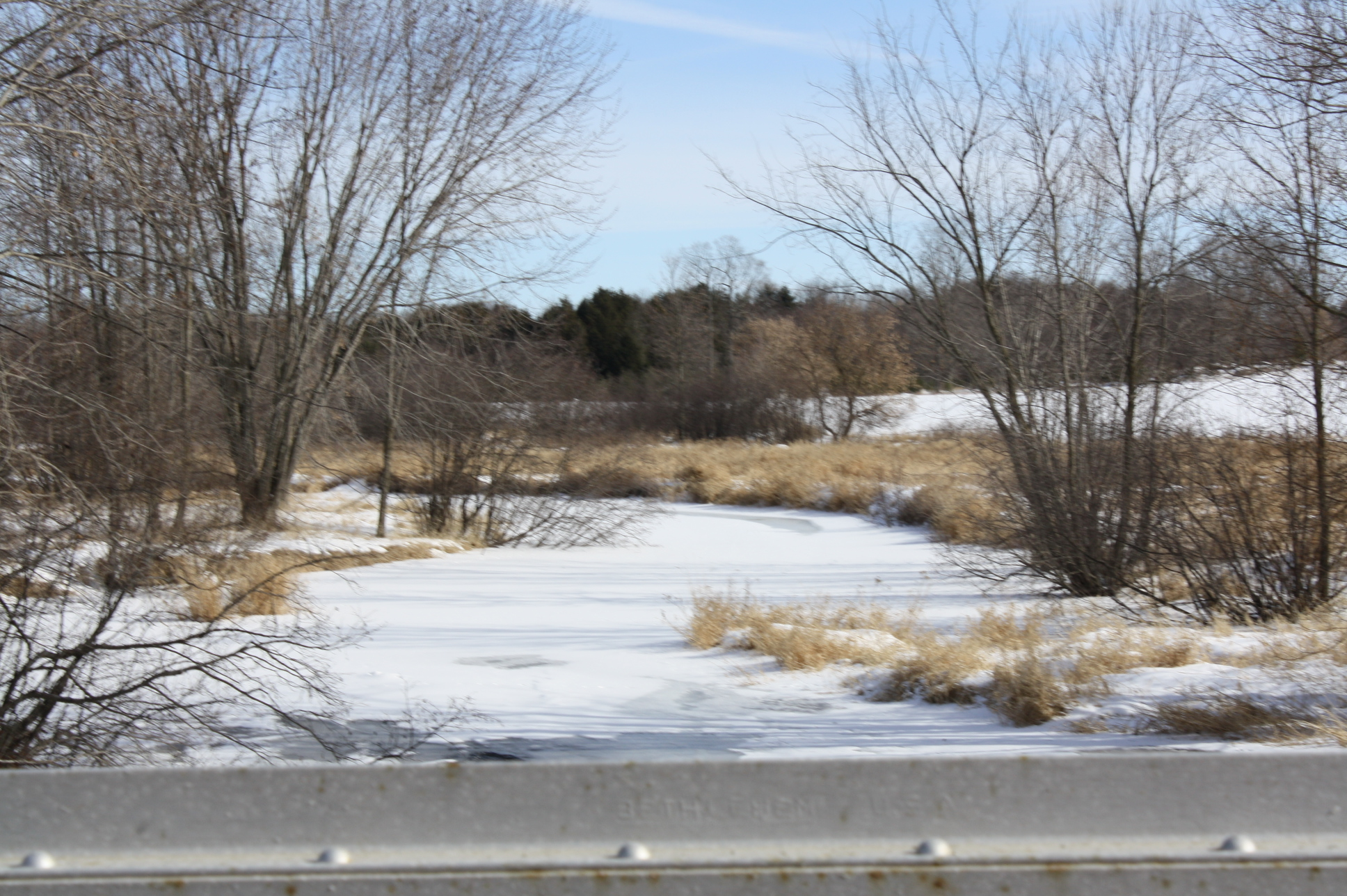
Embarrass River just south of Tilleda

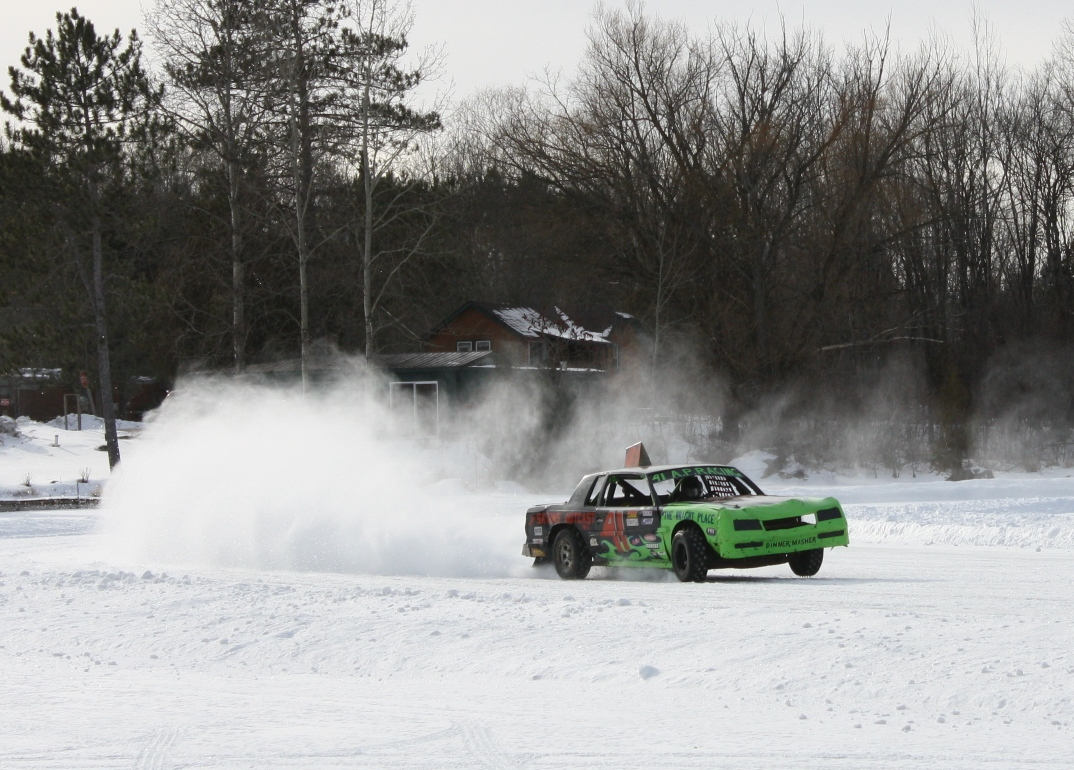
Ice racing on the Embarrass River in northern Tilleda

== Climate ==
The Köppen Climate Classification subtype for this climate is "Dfb" (Warm Summer Continental Climate).

Climate data for Tilleda, Wisconsin
Month	Jan	Feb	Mar	Apr	May	Jun	Jul	Aug	Sep	Oct	Nov	Dec	Year
Mean daily maximum °C (°F)	−6 (22)	−3 (27)	3 (38)	12 (54)	19 (67)	24 (76)	27 (80)	25 (77)	20 (68)	14 (57)	5 (41)	−3 (27)	12 (53)
Mean daily minimum °C (°F)	−18 (0)	−15.8 (3.6)	−8.6 (16.5)	−1 (30)	5 (41)	10 (50)	13 (55)	11 (52)	7 (44)	1 (34)	−5 (23)	−13 (9)	−1 (30)
Average precipitation mm (inches)	23 (0.9)	23 (0.9)	46 (1.8)	74 (2.9)	86 (3.4)	94 (3.7)	89 (3.5)	94 (3.7)	91 (3.6)	61 (2.4)	51 (2)	33 (1.3)	770 (30.2)
Source: Weatherbase
