= Leopolis, Wisconsin =

Census-designated place in Wisconsin, United States

Leopolis
- Census-designated place
- Location within the state of Wisconsin
- Coordinates: 44°46′05″N 88°50′41″W
- Country: United States
- State: Wisconsin
- County: Shawano

Area
  - Total: 0.373 sq mi (0.97 km^{2})
  - Land: 0.373 sq mi (0.97 km^{2})
  - Water: 0 sq mi (0 km^{2})

Population (2020)
  - Total: 86
  - Density: 230/sq mi (89/km^{2})
- Time zone: UTC-6 (Central (CST))
  - Summer (DST): UTC-5 (CDT)
- ZIP codes: 54948

Leopolis is an unincorporated census-designated place in Shawano County, Wisconsin, United States. The community is located on County Highway D, between the towns of Herman and Pella. As of the 2020 census, its population is 86.

Historical population
Census	Pop.	Note	%±
2010	87		—
2020	86		−1.1%
U.S. Decennial Census

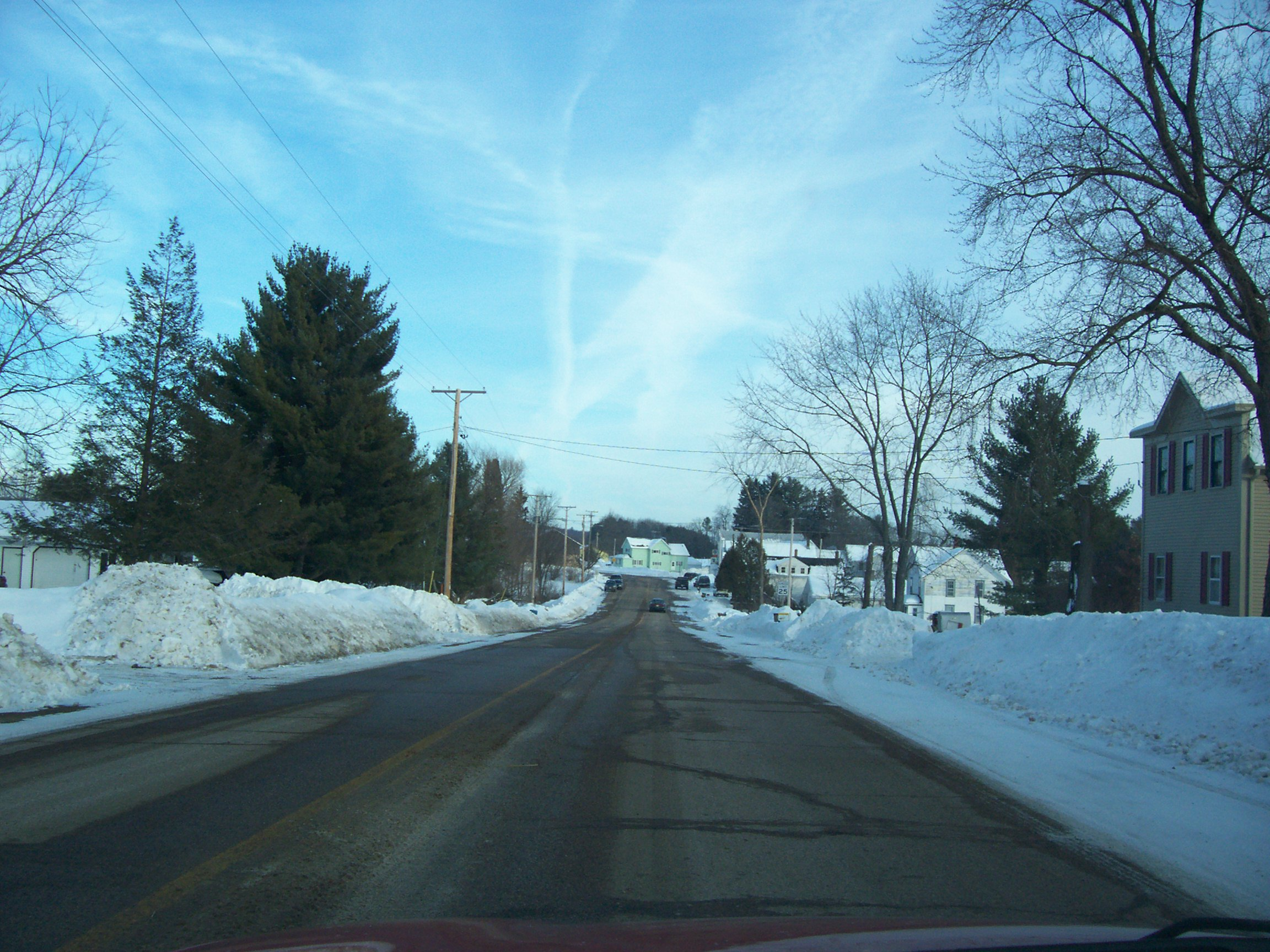
Looking east at Leopolis

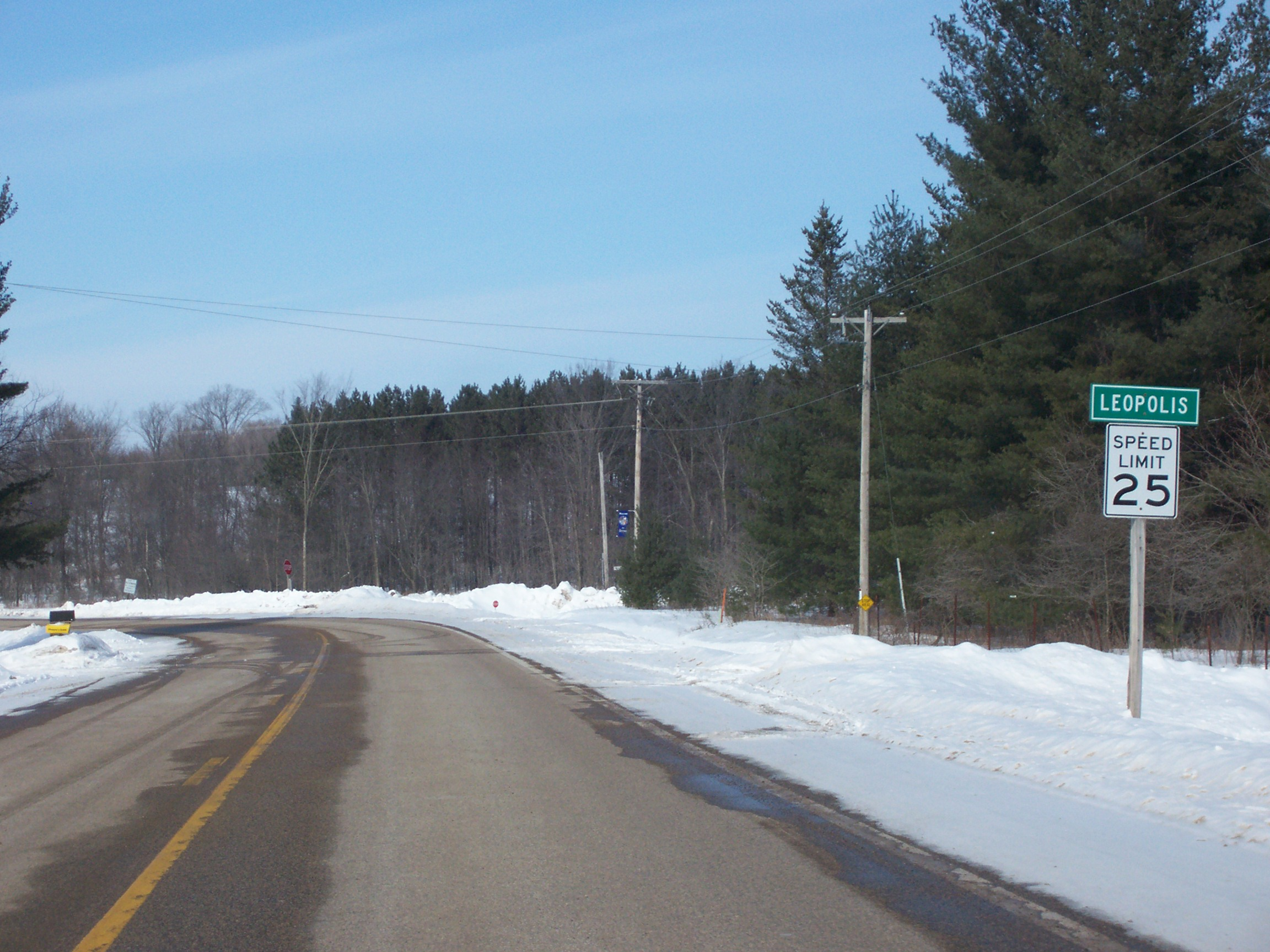
Looking west at Leopolis
