= Pel Hava =

Pel Hava پل هوا
- Village
- Location within Iran
- Coordinates: 33°38′33″N 48°17′55″E
- Country: Iran
- Province: Lorestan
- County: Khorramabad
- Bakhsh: Central
- Rural District: Robat

Population (2006)
  - Total: 218
- Time zone: UTC+3:30 (IRST)
  - Summer (DST): UTC+4:30 (IRDT)

Pel Hava (Persian: پل هوا, also Romanized as Pel Havā; also known as Pelleh Havā) is a village in Robat Rural District, in the Central District of Khorramabad County, Lorestan Province, Iran. At the 2006 census, its population was 218, in 36 families.
