= Herman, Shawano County, Wisconsin =

Herman, Wisconsin
- Town
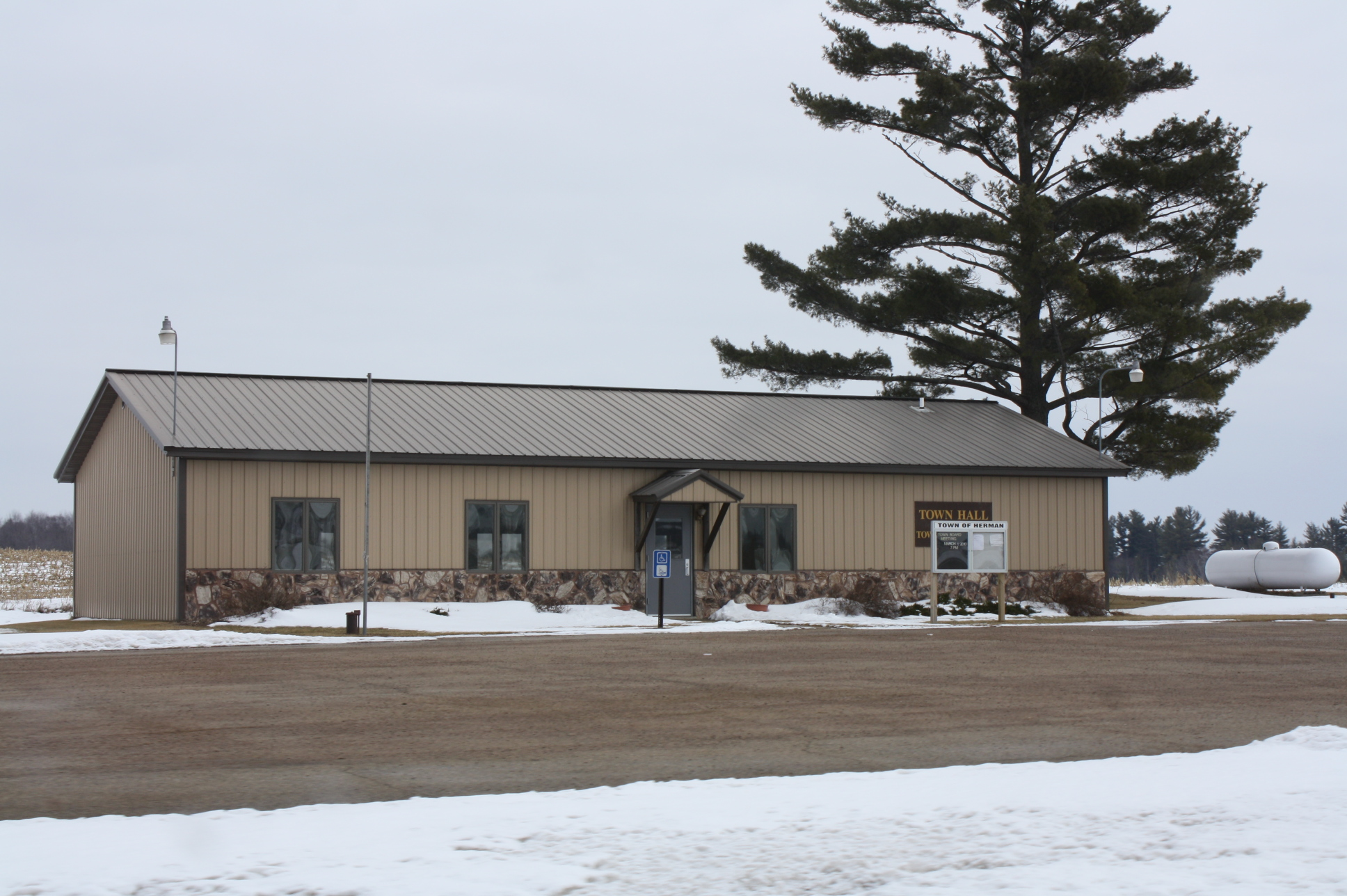
- Town hall

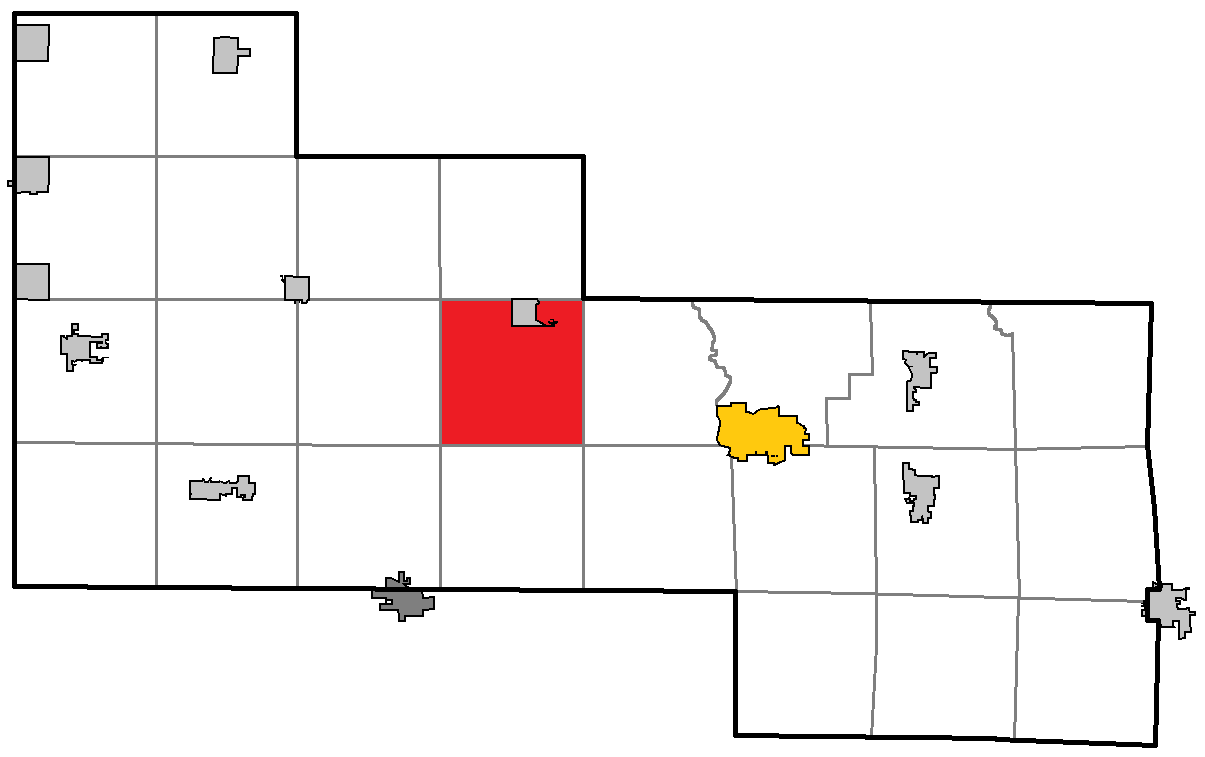
- Location of Herman, within Shawano County, Wisconsin
- Coordinates: 44°48′32″N 88°47′30″W
- Country: United States
- State: Wisconsin
- County: Shawano

Area
  - Total: 35.4 sq mi (91.7 km^{2})
  - Land: 35.2 sq mi (91.1 km^{2})
  - Water: 0.23 sq mi (0.6 km^{2})
- Elevation: 890 ft (270 m)

Population (2020)
  - Total: 739
  - Density: 21.0/sq mi (8.11/km^{2})
- Time zone: UTC-6 (Central (CST))
  - Summer (DST): UTC-5 (CDT)
- FIPS code: 55-34025
- GNIS feature ID: 1583380
- Website: https://www.townofherman-shawano.com/

Herman is a town in Shawano County, Wisconsin, United States. The population was 739 at the 2020 census. The unincorporated community of Lyndhurst is located in the town. The unincorporated community of Leopolis is also located partially within the town.

== Geography ==
According to the United States Census Bureau, the town has a total area of 35.4 square miles (91.7 km^{2}), of which 35.2 square miles (91.1 km^{2}) is land and 0.2 square mile (0.6 km^{2}; 0.65%) is water.

== Demographics ==
As of the census of 2000, there were 741 people, 269 households, and 207 families residing in the town. The population density was 21.1 people per square mile (8.1/km^{2}). There were 300 housing units at an average density of 8.5 per square mile (3.3/km^{2}). The racial makeup of the town was 92.17% White, 0.13% African American, 4.45% Native American, 0.13% Asian, 0.13% Pacific Islander, and 2.97% from two or more races. Hispanic or Latino of any race were 0.81% of the population.

There were 269 households, out of which 33.1% had children under the age of 18 living with them, 63.9% were married couples living together, 6.3% had a female householder with no husband present, and 23.0% were non-families. 19.0% of all households were made up of individuals, and 7.8% had someone living alone who was 65 years of age or older. The average household size was 2.75 and the average family size was 3.11.

In the town, the population was spread out, with 27.4% under the age of 18, 5.7% from 18 to 24, 25.5% from 25 to 44, 27.5% from 45 to 64, and 13.9% who were 65 years of age or older. The median age was 38 years. For every 100 females, there were 100.3 males. For every 100 females age 18 and over, there were 100.0 males.

The median income for a household in the town was $40,375, and the median income for a family was $46,250. Males had a median income of $31,776 versus $18,000 for females. The per capita income for the town was $16,388. About 2.2% of families and 4.7% of the population were below the poverty line, including 5.9% of those under age 18 and 6.0% of those age 65 or over.
