= Anston, Wisconsin =

- Unincorporated community
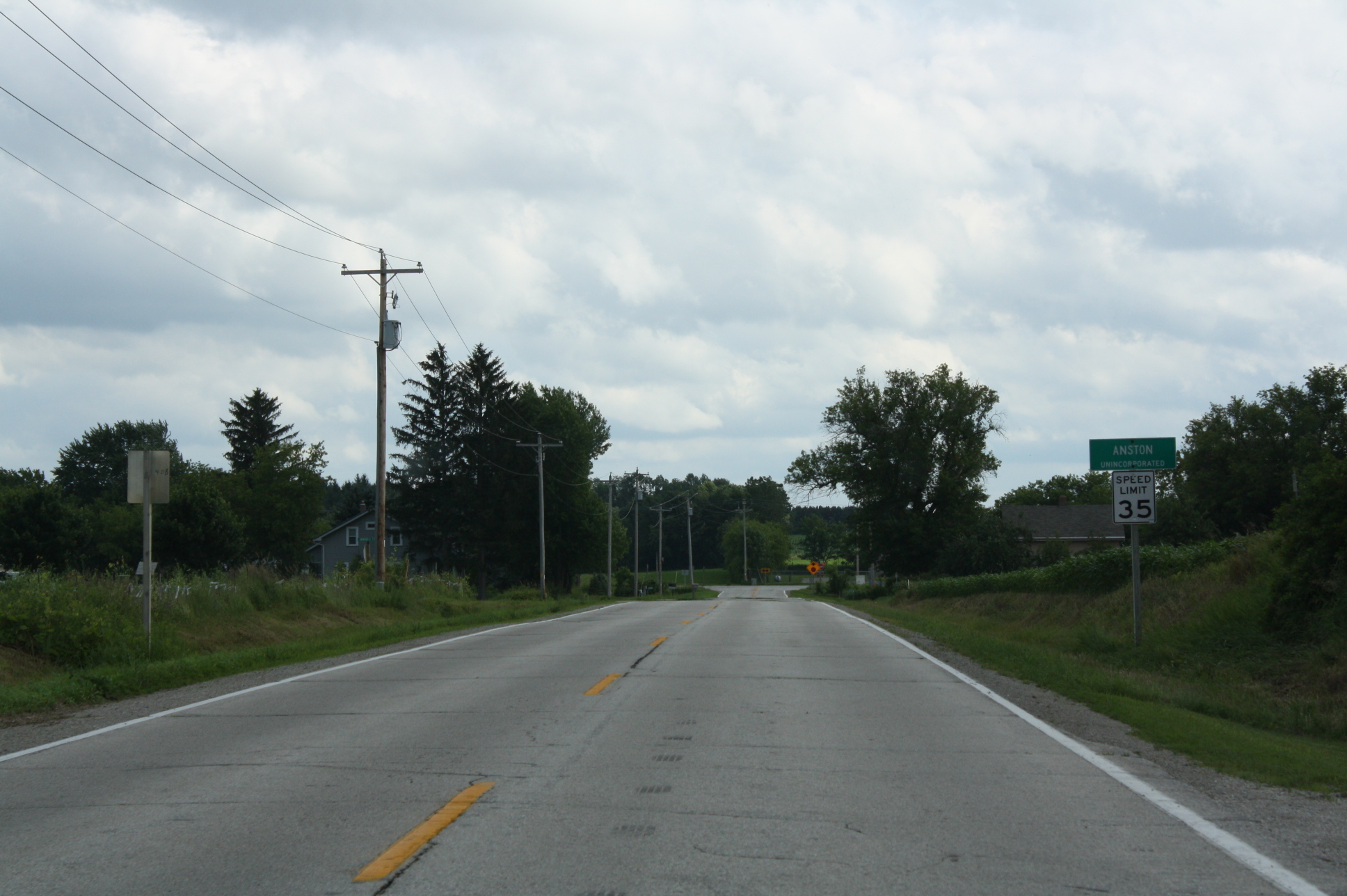
- Looking south at the welcome sign for Anston

- Location within Wisconsin Location within the United States
- Coordinates: 44°37′02″N 88°09′37″W
- Country: United States
- State: Wisconsin
- County: Brown
- Town: Pittsfield
- Elevation: 748 ft (228 m)
- Time zone: UTC-6 (Central (CST))
  - Summer (DST): UTC-5 (CDT)
- Area code: 920
- GNIS feature ID: 1560889

Anston is an unincorporated community located in the town of Pittsfield, in Brown County, Wisconsin, United States. It is located at latitude 44.617 and longitude -88.16; its elevation is 748 feet above mean sea level.

== History ==
Anston was named for a family of settlers.
