= Pella, Wisconsin =

- Town
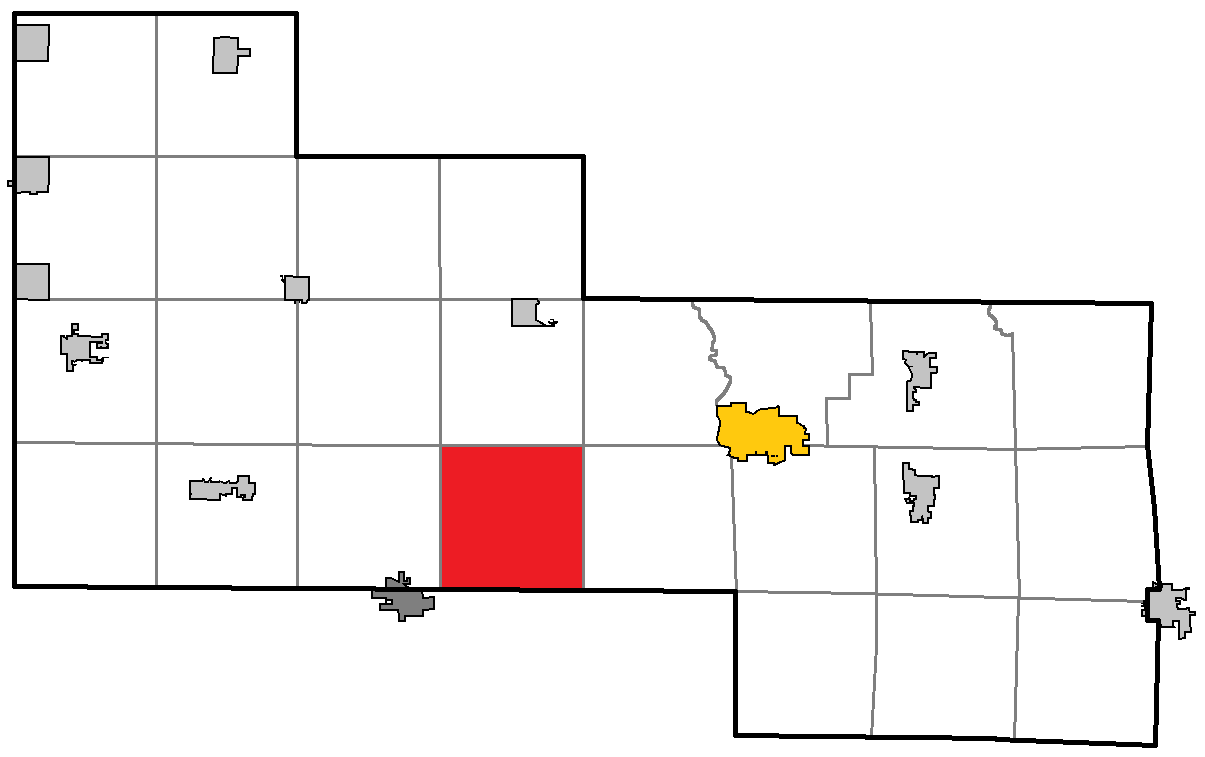
- Location of Pella, within Shawano County
- Coordinates: 44°43′51″N 88°48′27″W
- Country: United States
- State: Wisconsin
- County: Shawano

Area
  - Total: 36.8 sq mi (95.2 km^{2})
  - Land: 36.4 sq mi (94.3 km^{2})
  - Water: 0.35 sq mi (0.9 km^{2})
- Elevation: 902 ft (275 m)

Population (2020)
  - Total: 899
  - Density: 24.7/sq mi (9.53/km^{2})
- Time zone: UTC-6 (Central (CST))
  - Summer (DST): UTC-5 (CDT)
- FIPS code: 55-61700
- GNIS feature ID: 1583904
- Website: https://townofpella.com/

Pella is a town in Shawano County, Wisconsin, United States. The population was 899 at the 2020 census. The unincorporated community of Leopolis is located partially within the town. There is a census-designated place also called Pella in the town.

== Geography ==
According to the United States Census Bureau, the town has a total area of 36.8 square miles (95.2 km^{2}), of which 36.4 square miles (94.3 km^{2}) is land and 0.3 square mile (0.9 km^{2}) (0.95%) is water.

== Demographics ==
As of the census of 2000, there were 877 people, 348 households, and 247 families residing in the town. The population density was 24.1 people per square mile (9.3/km^{2}). There were 375 housing units at an average density of 10.3 per square mile (4.0/km^{2}). The racial makeup of the town was 99.20% White, 0.11% African American, 0.11% Native American, 0.23% Pacific Islander, 0.11% from other races, and 0.23% from two or more races. Hispanic or Latino of any race were 0.11% of the population.

There were 348 households, out of which 30.5% had children under the age of 18 living with them, 60.6% were married couples living together, 7.2% had a female householder with no husband present, and 29.0% were non-families. 23.6% of all households were made up of individuals, and 8.6% had someone living alone who was 65 years of age or older. The average household size was 2.52 and the average family size was 3.00.

In the town, the population was spread out, with 23.6% under the age of 18, 5.9% from 18 to 24, 27.0% from 25 to 44, 30.3% from 45 to 64, and 13.1% who were 65 years of age or older. The median age was 42 years. For every 100 females, there were 102.1 males. For every 100 females age 18 and over, there were 99.4 males.

The median income for a household in the town was $40,188, and the median income for a family was $44,444. Males had a median income of $30,592 versus $19,271 for females. The per capita income for the town was $17,926. About 4.8% of families and 8.5% of the population were below the poverty line, including 7.5% of those under age 18 and 3.7% of those age 65 or over.
