= List of towns in Wisconsin =

Wisconsin towns
- Map of towns, villages, cities, and counties in Wisconsin.
- Category: Lower-level administrative division
- Location: Wisconsin
- Created: Early-19th Century
- Number: 1,242
- Populations: 41 (Cedar Rapids) – 24,579 (Grand Chute)
- Areas: 2.5 square miles (6.5 km^{2}) (Somers Town) – 365 square miles (950 km^{2}) (Menominee Town)
- Government: Town government

Towns in Wisconsin are similar to civil townships in other states. For a more detailed discussion, see Administrative divisions of Wisconsin.

Frequently a village or city may have the same name as a town. As of 2026, Wisconsin has 1,242 towns, some with the same name. This list of towns and their respective counties is current as of 2026, per the Wisconsin Department of Administration.

== Towns ==
2025 Rank	Town	2025 Estimate	2020 Census	Change	County
1	Grand Chute	24,579	23,831	+3.14%	Outagamie
2	Ledgeview	9,642	8,820	+9.32%	Brown
3	Oconomowoc	8,849	8,836	+0.15%	Waukesha
4	Hudson	8,736	8,671	+0.75%	St. Croix
5	Sheboygan	8,615	8,136	+5.89%	Sheboygan
6	Merton	8,319	8,277	+0.51%	Waukesha
7	Beloit	8,014	7,721	+3.79%	Rock
8	Delafield	8,012	8,095	−1.03%	Waukesha
9	Norway	7,856	7,916	−0.76%	Racine
10	Mukwonago	7,763	7,781	−0.23%	Waukesha
11	Grand Rapids	7,622	7,576	+0.61%	Wood
12	Washington	7,478	7,662	−2.40%	Eau Claire
13	Genesee	7,235	7,171	+0.89%	Waukesha
14	Algoma	6,956	6,866	+1.31%	Winnebago
15	Lawrence	6,937	6,306	+10.01%	Brown
16	Middleton	6,833	6,792	+0.60%	Dane
17	Buchanan	6,793	6,857	−0.93%	Outagamie
18	Brookfield	6,515	6,477	+0.59%	Waukesha
19	Waterford	6,507	6,514	−0.11%	Racine
20	Lafayette	6,430	6,197	+3.76%	Chippewa
21	Burlington	6,403	6,465	−0.96%	Racine
22	Freedom	6,354	6,216	+2.22%	Outagamie
23	Cedarburg	6,169	6,162	+0.11%	Ozaukee
24	Onalaska	5,809	5,835	−0.45%	La Crosse
25	Little Suamico	5,794	5,536	+4.66%	Oconto
26	Troy	5,686	5,518	+3.04%	St. Croix
27	Geneva	5,443	5,390	+0.98%	Walworth
28	Clayton	5,303	4,329	+22.50%	Winnebago
29	Hull	5,239	5,287	−0.91%	Portage
30	Delavan	5,210	5,273	−1.19%	Walworth
31	Saratoga	5,141	5,060	+1.60%	Wood
32	Ixonia	5,083	5,120	−0.72%	Jefferson
33	Minocqua	5,062	5,062	0.00%	Oneida
34	Trenton	4,721	4,525	+4.33%	Washington
35	Taycheedah	4,690	4,554	+2.99%	Fond du Lac
36	Dunn	4,676	4,880	−4.18%	Dane
37	Shelby	4,668	4,804	−2.83%	La Crosse
38	Oneida	4,568	4,579	−0.24%	Outagamie
39	Somerset	4,536	4,291	+5.71%	St. Croix
40	Holland	4,512	4,530	−0.40%	La Crosse
41	St. Joseph	4,408	4,178	+5.51%	St. Croix
42	West Bend	4,401	4,441	−0.90%	Washington
43	Bristol	4,347	4,447	−2.25%	Dane
44	Grafton	4,343	4,355	−0.28%	Ozaukee
45	Richmond	4,276	4,074	+4.96%	St. Croix
46	Westport	4,249	4,191	+1.38%	Dane
47	Dover	4,202	4,282	−1.87%	Racine
48	Menominee	4,199	4,255	−1.32%	Menominee
49	Beaver Dam	4,105	4,062	+1.06%	Dodge
50	Campbell	4,092	4,284	−4.48%	La Crosse
51	Peshtigo	4,087	4,006	+2.02%	Marinette
52	Polk	4,041	3,988	+1.33%	Washington
53	East Troy	4,002	3,992	+0.25%	Walworth
54	Jackson	3,950	4,629	−14.67%	Washington
55	Hayward	3,928	3,765	+4.33%	Sawyer
56	Sugar Creek	3,888	3,902	−0.36%	Walworth
57	Pleasant Valley	3,878	3,791	+2.29%	Eau Claire
58	Erin	3,835	3,825	+0.26%	Washington
59	Fond du Lac	3,780	3,687	+2.52%	Fond du Lac
60	Koshkonong	3,776	3,763	+0.35%	Jefferson
61	Star Prairie	3,771	3,733	+1.02%	St. Croix
62	Fulton	3,715	3,580	+3.77%	Rock
63	Center	3,706	3,622	+2.32%	Outagamie
64	Janesville	3,699	3,665	+0.93%	Rock
65	Cottage Grove	3,677	3,791	−3.01%	Dane
66	Neenah	3,673	3,702	−0.78%	Winnebago
67	Lac du Flambeau	3,659	3,552	+3.01%	Vilas
68	Stephenson	3,654	3,494	+4.58%	Marinette
69	Scott	3,650	3,636	+0.39%	Brown
70	Lyons	3,635	3,648	−0.36%	Walworth
71	Ottawa	3,642	3,646	−0.11%	Waukesha
72	Farmington	3,586	3,645	−1.62%	Washington
73	Eagle	3,536	3,478	+1.67%	Waukesha
74	Menomonie	3,514	3,415	+2.90%	Dunn
75	Arbor Vitae	3,503	3,403	+2.94%	Vilas
76	Farmington	3,501	3,712	−5.68%	Waupaca
77	Rome	3,420	3,025	+13.06%	Adams
78	Addison	3,416	3,464	−1.39%	Washington
79	Wilson	3,401	3,484	−2.38%	Sheboygan
80	Chase	3,373	3,174	+6.27%	Oconto
81	Hartford	3,359	3,400	−1.21%	Washington
82	Wheatland	3,337	3,391	−1.59%	Kenosha
83	Ellington	3,307	3,174	+4.19%	Outagamie
84	Wescott	3,287	3,257	+0.92%	Shawano
85	Sparta	3,277	3,253	+0.74%	Monroe
86	Randall	3,276	3,285	−0.27%	Kenosha
87	Eagle Point	3,267	3,237	+0.93%	Chippewa
88	Seymour	3,261	3,352	−2.71%	Eau Claire
89	Lodi	3,259	3,282	−0.70%	Columbia
90	Oakland	3,215	3,231	−0.50%	Jefferson
91	Milton	3,129	3,100	+0.94%	Rock
92	Osceola	3,125	3,023	+3.37%	Polk
93	Burke	3,089	3,265	−5.39%	Dane
94	Plymouth	3,038	3,083	−1.46%	Sheboygan
95	Alden	3,019	2,918	+3.46%	Polk
96	Stockton	3,019	3,018	+0.03%	Portage
97	Oregon	2,994	3,125	−4.19%	Dane
98	Brockway	2,991	3,035	−1.45%	Jackson
99	Rock	2,988	2,981	+0.23%	Rock
100	Pleasant Springs	2,968	3,078	−3.57%	Dane
101	Lima	2,920	2,956	−1.22%	Sheboygan
102	Dale	2,902	2,869	+1.15%	Outagamie
103	Rice Lake	2,897	2,813	+2.99%	Barron
104	Bass Lake	2,896	2,731	+6.04%	Sawyer
105	Newbold	2,869	2,831	+1.34%	Oneida
106	Merrill	2,856	2,881	−0.87%	Lincoln
107	Pelican	2,840	2,809	+1.10%	Oneida
108	Pittsfield	2,838	2,791	+1.68%	Brown
109	Sevastopol	2,835	2,826	+0.32%	Door
110	Springfield	2,800	2,929	−4.40%	Dane
111	Mukwa	2,793	2,830	−1.31%	Waupaca
112	Empire	2,790	2,774	+0.58%	Fond du Lac
113	Wheaton	2,785	2,759	+0.94%	Chippewa
114	Friendship	2,774	2,748	+0.95%	Fond du Lac
115	Barton	2,769	2,743	+0.95%	Washington
116	Pacific	2,769	2,791	−0.79%	Columbia
117	Lincoln	2,737	2,659	+2.93%	Vilas
118	Pine Lake	2,733	2,724	+0.33%	Oneida
119	Hammond	2,732	2,565	+6.51%	St. Croix
120	Linn	2,707	2,687	+0.74%	Walworth
121	Tainter	2,690	2,643	+1.78%	Dunn
122	Winneconne	2,681	2,590	+3.51%	Winnebago
123	Ashippun	2,666	2,663	+0.11%	Dodge
124	Dayton	2,608	2,644	−1.36%	Waupaca
125	Harmony	2,608	2,569	+1.52%	Rock
126	Stettin	2,593	2,580	+0.50%	Marathon
127	Oak Grove	2,561	2,361	+8.47%	Pierce
128	Union	2,556	2,696	−5.19%	Eau Claire
129	Fox Lake	2,550	2,588	−1.47%	Dodge
130	Medford	2,506	2,482	+0.97%	Taylor
131	Necedah	2,493	2,448	+1.84%	Juneau
132	Stanley	2,492	2,570	−3.04%	Barron
133	Dekorra	2,485	2,500	−0.60%	Columbia
134	Red Cedar	2,480	2,359	+5.13%	Dunn
135	La Grange	2,475	2,472	+0.12%	Walworth
136	Black Wolf	2,447	2,429	+0.74%	Winnebago
137	Three Lakes	2,444	2,413	+1.28%	Oneida
138	Delton	2,441	2,460	−0.77%	Sauk
139	Oshkosh	2,436	2,439	−0.12%	Winnebago
140	Bradley	2,425	2,382	+1.81%	Lincoln
141	Omro	2,409	2,293	+5.06%	Winnebago
142	Auburn	2,404	2,360	+1.86%	Fond du Lac
143	Turtle	2,392	2,393	−0.04%	Rock
144	Wausau	2,353	2,161	+8.88%	Marathon
145	Troy	2,331	2,355	−1.02%	Walworth
146	Anson	2,330	2,297	+1.44%	Chippewa
147	Sullivan	2,318	2,295	+1.00%	Jefferson
148	Hamilton	2,311	2,428	−4.82%	La Crosse
149	Jamestown	2,305	2,181	+5.69%	Grant
150	Superior	2,295	2,264	+1.37%	Douglas
151	Wayne	2,292	2,182	+5.04%	Washington
152	Sun Prairie	2,291	2,391	−4.18%	Dane
153	Clifton	2,289	2,177	+5.14%	Pierce
154	River Falls	2,278	2,215	+2.84%	Pierce
155	Mosinee	2,275	2,216	+2.66%	Marathon
156	Greenbush	2,235	1,903	+17.45%	Sheboygan
157	Holland	2,229	2,273	−1.94%	Sheboygan
158	Exeter	2,209	2,156	+2.46%	Green
159	Lake Mills	2,206	2,196	+0.46%	Jefferson
160	Greenfield	2,177	2,187	−0.46%	La Crosse
161	Green Bay	2,193	2,197	−0.18%	Brown
162	Florence	2,193	2,096	+4.63%	Florence
163	Bridge Creek	2,191	2,214	−1.04%	Eau Claire
164	Manitowoc Rapids	2,184	2,114	+3.31%	Manitowoc
165	Herman	2,160	2,162	−0.09%	Sheboygan
166	Rubicon	2,158	2,117	+1.94%	Dodge
167	St. Germain	2,150	2,083	+3.22%	Vilas
168	Lincoln	2,144	2,099	+2.14%	Polk
169	Liberty Grove	2,130	2,096	+1.62%	Door
170	Sharon	2,124	2,123	+0.05%	Portage
171	Rhine	2,123	2,139	−0.75%	Sheboygan
172	Farmington	2,122	2,140	−0.84%	La Crosse
173	Newton	2,117	2,122	−0.24%	Manitowoc
174	Spring Prairie	2,109	2,123	−0.66%	Walworth
175	Union	2,099	2,104	−0.24%	Rock
176	Verona	2,092	1,947	+7.45%	Dane
177	Marion	2,091	2,020	+3.51%	Waushara
178	Fredonia	2,087	2,078	+0.43%	Ozaukee
179	McMillan	2,085	2,074	+0.53%	Marathon
180	Woodruff	2,082	2,044	+1.86%	Oneida
181	Lafayette	2,077	2,039	+1.86%	Walworth
182	West Point	2,066	2,028	+1.87%	Columbia
183	Jefferson	2,060	2,067	−0.34%	Jefferson
184	Elk Mound	2,057	1,897	+8.43%	Dunn
185	Abrams	2,033	1,960	+3.72%	Oconto
186	Nasewaupee	2,028	1,984	+2.22%	Door
187	Farmington	2,027	1,904	+6.46%	Polk
188	Springdale	2,021	2,056	−1.70%	Dane
189	Trempealeau	2,014	1,951	+3.23%	Trempealeau
190	Albion	2,007	2,069	−3.00%	Dane
191	Knowlton	2,003	1,984	+0.96%	Marathon
192	New Chester	2,002	1,960	+2.14%	Adams
193	Washington	1,990	1,965	+1.27%	Shawano
194	Crescent	1,986	1,984	+0.10%	Oneida
195	Kossuth	1,978	1,969	+0.46%	Manitowoc
196	Concord	1,964	1,981	−0.86%	Jefferson
197	La Grange	1,964	1,948	+0.82%	Monroe
198	Schleswig	1,957	1,912	+2.35%	Manitowoc
199	Trenton	1,944	1,911	+1.73%	Pierce
200	Watertown	1,938	1,933	+0.26%	Jefferson
201	Brunswick	1,929	1,958	−1.48%	Eau Claire
202	Porterfield	1,927	1,888	+2.07%	Marinette
203	Dellona	1,912	1,901	+0.58%	Sauk
204	Rutland	1,910	1,977	−3.39%	Dane
205	Germantown	1,892	1,628	+16.22%	Juneau
206	Richmond	1,883	1,901	−0.95%	Walworth
207	Angelica	1,880	1,822	+3.18%	Shawano
208	Sugar Camp	1,876	1,819	+3.13%	Oneida
209	Osceola	1,874	1,836	+2.07%	Fond du Lac
210	Grant	1,849	1,842	+0.38%	Portage
211	Richmond	1,846	1,832	+0.76%	Shawano
212	Pine River	1,845	1,874	−1.55%	Lincoln
213	Brooklyn	1,841	1,787	+3.02%	Green Lake
214	Sheboygan Falls	1,838	1,824	+0.77%	Sheboygan
215	Rockland	1,833	1,775	+3.27%	Brown
216	Warren	1,830	1,733	+5.60%	St. Croix
217	Kinnickinnic	1,827	1,815	+0.66%	St. Croix
218	Viroqua	1,813	1,744	+3.96%	Vernon
219	Winchester	1,811	1,794	+0.95%	Winnebago
220	Saukville	1,809	1,765	+2.49%	Ozaukee
221	Spring Green	1,804	1,828	−1.31%	Sauk
222	Dunkirk	1,798	1,881	−4.41%	Dane
223	Roxbury	1,796	1,871	−4.01%	Dane
224	Buena Vista	1,794	1,807	−0.72%	Richland
225	Spring Brook	1,793	1,687	+6.28%	Dunn
226	Hubbard	1,785	1,772	+0.73%	Dodge
227	Wyocena	1,782	1,756	+1.48%	Columbia
228	Lamartine	1,781	1,747	+1.95%	Fond du Lac
229	Baraboo	1,778	1,816	−2.09%	Sauk
230	Garfield	1,775	1,744	+1.78%	Polk
231	Ringle	1,763	1,743	+1.15%	Marathon
232	Belle Plaine	1,756	1,800	−2.44%	Shawano
233	Chetek	1,756	1,726	+1.74%	Barron
234	Decatur	1,756	1,685	+4.21%	Green
235	Eureka	1,756	1,737	+1.09%	Polk
236	Caledonia	1,755	1,712	+2.51%	Waupaca
237	Grover	1,754	1,731	+1.33%	Marinette
238	Ashford	1,746	1,722	+1.39%	Fond du Lac
239	Gale	1,743	1,708	+2.05%	Trempealeau
240	Vinland	1,739	1,769	−1.70%	Winnebago
241	Angelo	1,737	1,697	+2.36%	Monroe
242	Dell Prairie	1,731	1,631	+6.13%	Adams
243	Scott	1,725	1,764	−2.21%	Sheboygan
244	Trimbelle	1,720	1,679	+2.44%	Pierce
245	Arcadia	1,719	1,696	+1.36%	Trempealeau
246	Eaton	1,706	1,662	+2.65%	Brown
247	Morrison	1,706	1,689	+1.01%	Brown
248	Vandenbroek	1,701	1,627	+4.55%	Outagamie
249	Rushford	1,690	1,623	+4.13%	Winnebago
250	Two Rivers	1,688	1,672	+0.96%	Manitowoc
251	Byron	1,679	1,677	+0.12%	Fond du Lac
252	Cato	1,676	1,621	+3.39%	Manitowoc
253	Prairie Lake	1,670	1,648	+1.33%	Barron
254	Richfield	1,652	1,596	+3.51%	Wood
255	Mercer	1,649	1,649	0.00%	Iron
256	Lemonweir	1,645	1,658	−0.78%	Juneau
257	Brillion	1,644	1,650	−0.36%	Calumet
258	Russell	1,644	1,553	+5.86%	Bayfield
259	Washington	1,640	1,587	+3.34%	Vilas
260	Lincoln	1,630	1,593	+2.32%	Wood
261	Lebanon	1,629	1,619	+0.62%	Waupaca
262	Darien	1,618	1,651	−2.00%	Walworth
263	Excelsior	1,616	1,603	+0.81%	Sauk
264	Deerfield	1,613	1,684	−4.22%	Dane
265	Dodgeville	1,610	1,586	+1.51%	Iowa
266	Texas	1,604	1,611	−0.43%	Marathon
267	Port Washington	1,601	1,538	+4.10%	Ozaukee
268	Spencer	1,599	1,586	+0.82%	Marathon
269	Vienna	1,597	1,666	−4.14%	Dane
270	Lebanon	1,576	1,587	−0.69%	Dodge
271	Leon	1,569	1,534	+2.28%	Waushara
272	Plover	1,565	1,565	0.00%	Portage
273	Medary	1,563	1,604	−2.56%	La Crosse
274	Egg Harbor	1,562	1,458	+7.13%	Door
275	Platteville	1,554	1,513	+2.71%	Grant
276	Stiles	1,553	1,518	+2.31%	Oconto
277	Princeton	1,552	1,519	+2.17%	Green Lake
278	Walworth	1,551	1,565	−0.89%	Walworth
279	Lind	1,550	1,571	−1.34%	Waupaca
280	Lanark	1,546	1,535	+0.72%	Portage
281	Worcester	1,546	1,543	+0.19%	Price
282	Little Falls	1,545	1,509	+2.39%	Monroe
283	Lyndon	1,545	1,526	+1.25%	Sheboygan
284	New Denmark	1,539	1,562	−1.47%	Brown
285	Holland	1,538	1,559	−1.35%	Brown
286	Tilden	1,537	1,516	+1.39%	Chippewa
287	Newark	1,516	1,510	+0.40%	Rock
288	Packwaukee	1,497	1,469	+1.91%	Marquette
289	Arena	1,496	1,486	+0.67%	Iowa
290	Lyndon	1,493	1,493	0.00%	Juneau
291	New Holstein	1,490	1,534	−2.87%	Calumet
292	Caledonia	1,489	1,495	−0.40%	Columbia
293	Blooming Grove	1,488	1,622	−8.26%	Dane
294	Cleveland	1,487	1,486	+0.07%	Marathon
295	Dunn	1,477	1,473	+0.27%	Dunn
296	Black Brook	1,471	1,425	+3.23%	Polk
297	Luxemburg	1,468	1,458	+0.69%	Kewaunee
298	Tomah	1,464	1,488	−1.61%	Monroe
299	Clinton	1,461	1,374	+6.33%	Vernon
300	Cross Plains	1,453	1,494	−2.74%	Dane
301	Belgium	1,450	1,450	0.00%	Ozaukee
302	Rolling	1,449	1,432	+1.19%	Langlade
303	Buffalo	1,446	1,389	+4.10%	Marquette
304	Meeme	1,446	1,440	+0.42%	Manitowoc
305	Sherman	1,444	1,452	−0.55%	Sheboygan
306	La Valle	1,443	1,420	+1.62%	Sauk
307	Preston	1,441	1,377	+4.65%	Adams
308	Brighton	1,438	1,422	+1.13%	Kenosha
309	Pound	1,435	1,412	+1.63%	Marinette
310	Calumet	1,432	1,412	+1.42%	Fond du Lac
311	Adams	1,431	1,378	+3.85%	Adams
312	Balsam Lake	1,430	1,416	+0.99%	Polk
313	New Glarus	1,427	1,393	+2.44%	Green
314	Nokomis	1,425	1,372	+3.86%	Oneida
315	Whitewater	1,423	1,433	−0.70%	Walworth
316	Stockbridge	1,419	1,453	−2.34%	Calumet
317	Amherst	1,404	1,402	+0.14%	Portage
318	Carson	1,403	1,374	+2.11%	Portage
319	Sanborn	1,402	1,381	+1.52%	Ashland
320	Adams	1,400	1,389	+0.79%	Jackson
321	Eldorado	1,399	1,399	0.00%	Fond du Lac
322	Farmington	1,398	1,407	−0.64%	Jefferson
323	Oconto	1,398	1,340	+4.33%	Oconto
324	Lenroot	1,395	1,337	+4.34%	Sawyer
325	Pensaukee	1,394	1,352	+3.11%	Oconto
326	Waupun	1,390	1,373	+1.24%	Fond du Lac
327	Red River	1,387	1,374	+0.95%	Kewaunee
328	Brazeau	1,381	1,340	+3.06%	Oconto
329	Antigo	1,380	1,369	+0.80%	Langlade
330	Montpelier	1,375	1,362	+0.95%	Kewaunee
331	Utica	1,375	1,364	+0.81%	Winnebago
332	Aztalan	1,373	1,382	−0.65%	Jefferson
333	Conover	1,373	1,318	+4.17%	Vilas
334	Little Wolf	1,373	1,400	−1.93%	Waupaca
335	Scott	1,371	1,377	−0.44%	Lincoln
336	Bergen	1,363	1,365	−0.15%	Vernon
337	Fremont	1,363	1,312	+3.89%	Clark
338	Nashville	1,359	1,215	+11.85%	Forest
339	Port Edwards	1,358	1,356	+0.15%	Wood
340	Paris	1,356	1,397	−2.93%	Kenosha
341	Hustisford	1,350	1,357	−0.52%	Dodge
342	Gibson	1,338	1,315	+1.75%	Manitowoc
343	Mishicot	1,335	1,327	+0.60%	Manitowoc
344	Nekimi	1,335	1,337	−0.15%	Winnebago
345	Royalton	1,330	1,359	−2.13%	Waupaca
346	Hazelhurst	1,323	1,299	+1.85%	Oneida
347	Ripon	1,320	1,314	+0.46%	Fond du Lac
348	Westford	1,312	1,313	−0.08%	Dodge
349	Ettrick	1,307	1,285	+1.71%	Trempealeau
350	Springville	1,305	1,283	+1.71%	Adams
351	Medina	1,300	1,344	−3.27%	Dane
352	Wautoma	1,298	1,270	+2.20%	Waushara
353	Poygan	1,297	1,261	+2.85%	Winnebago
354	Merrimac	1,296	1,247	+3.93%	Sauk
355	Kaukauna	1,295	1,306	−0.84%	Outagamie
356	Mitchell	1,293	1,900	−31.95%	Sheboygan
357	Cooperstown	1,292	1,300	−0.62%	Manitowoc
358	Oconto Falls	1,291	1,259	+2.54%	Oconto
359	Jefferson	1,289	1,270	+1.50%	Vernon
360	West Kewaunee	1,289	1,278	+0.86%	Kewaunee
361	Gibraltar	1,288	1,228	+4.89%	Door
362	Humboldt	1,286	1,299	−1.00%	Brown
363	Brothertown	1,282	1,328	−3.46%	Calumet
364	Lima	1,279	1,271	+0.63%	Rock
365	Monroe	1,276	1,291	−1.16%	Green
366	Colfax	1,275	1,230	+3.66%	Dunn
367	Emmet	1,274	1,310	−2.75%	Dodge
368	Iron River	1,274	1,240	+2.74%	Bayfield
369	Springwater	1,273	1,257	+1.27%	Waushara
370	Phelps	1,269	1,238	+2.50%	Vilas
371	Barre	1,262	1,267	−0.39%	La Crosse
372	Baileys Harbor	1,258	1,223	+2.86%	Door
373	Eau Galle	1,256	1,253	+0.24%	St. Croix
374	Liberty	1,253	1,245	+0.64%	Manitowoc
375	Larrabee	1,251	1,286	−2.72%	Waupaca
376	Meenon	1,251	1,212	+3.22%	Burnett
377	Black Creek	1,249	1,251	−0.16%	Outagamie
378	Franklin	1,249	1,250	−0.08%	Manitowoc
379	Byron	1,245	1,234	+0.89%	Monroe
380	Lewiston	1,244	1,262	−1.43%	Columbia
381	Lake	1,242	1,186	+4.72%	Marinette
382	Lessor	1,242	1,226	+1.31%	Shawano
383	Albany	1,241	1,189	+4.37%	Green
384	Wrightstown	1,240	2,578	−51.90%	Brown
385	Milltown	1,236	1,219	+1.39%	Polk
386	Laona	1,238	1,215	+1.89%	Forest
387	Palmyra	1,230	1,220	+0.82%	Jefferson
388	Osborn	1,229	1,200	+2.42%	Outagamie
389	Evergreen	1,228	1,191	+3.11%	Washburn
390	Gardner	1,228	1,218	+0.82%	Door
391	Parkland	1,228	1,231	−0.24%	Douglas
392	Wolf River	1,226	1,203	+1.91%	Winnebago
393	Strongs Prairie	1,224	1,145	+6.90%	Adams
394	Amnicon	1,213	1,224	−0.90%	Douglas
395	Quincy	1,212	1,159	+4.57%	Adams
396	Trenton	1,212	1,219	−0.57%	Dodge
397	Grantsburg	1,208	1,174	+2.90%	Burnett
398	Pine Valley	1,208	1,175	+2.81%	Clark
399	Apple River	1,205	1,173	+2.73%	Polk
400	Seymour	1,201	1,191	+0.84%	Outagamie
401	Marshfield	1,199	1,123	+6.77%	Fond du Lac
402	Oakland	1,196	1,170	+2.22%	Douglas
403	Green Lake	1,194	1,169	+2.14%	Green Lake
404	Elcho	1,193	1,168	+2.14%	Langlade
405	Beaver	1,192	1,153	+3.38%	Marinette
406	Bovina	1,190	1,153	+3.21%	Outagamie
407	Martell	1,187	1,147	+3.49%	Pierce
408	Christiana	1,186	1,235	−3.97%	Dane
409	Jackson	1,183	1,141	+3.68%	Adams
410	Plymouth	1,175	1,245	−5.62%	Rock
411	Montello	1,174	1,132	+3.71%	Marquette
412	Reid	1,172	1,186	−1.18%	Marathon
413	St. Croix Falls	1,171	1,164	+0.60%	Polk
414	Casco	1,170	1,150	+1.74%	Kewaunee
415	Dakota	1,169	1,143	+2.27%	Waushara
416	Lincoln	1,167	1,133	+3.00%	Forest
417	Lake Tomahawk	1,162	1,155	+0.61%	Oneida
418	Sigel	1,162	1,132	+2.65%	Chippewa
419	Richland	1,161	1,175	−1.19%	Richland
420	Easton	1,160	1,148	+1.05%	Marathon
421	Albion	1,158	1,197	−3.26%	Jackson
422	Lowell	1,157	1,166	−0.77%	Dodge
423	Jefferson	1,152	1,170	−1.54%	Green
424	Leon	1,151	1,144	+0.61%	Monroe
425	Round Lake	1,148	1,081	+6.20%	Sawyer
426	Buena Vista	1,145	1,145	0.00%	Portage
427	Herman	1,145	1,135	+0.88%	Dodge
428	Little Black	1,145	1,156	−0.95%	Taylor
429	Waupaca	1,145	1,194	−4.10%	Waupaca
430	Clarno	1,142	1,133	+0.79%	Green
431	Marcellon	1,141	1,140	+0.09%	Columbia
432	Berry	1,138	1,168	−2.57%	Dane
433	Wausaukee	1,138	1,097	+3.74%	Marinette
434	Ellsworth	1,136	1,121	+1.34%	Pierce
435	Franklin	1,132	1,106	+2.35%	Vernon
436	Mount Morris	1,132	1,096	+3.28%	Waushara
437	Little River	1,126	1,092	+3.11%	Oconto
438	Reedsburg	1,126	1,185	−4.98%	Sauk
439	Edson	1,121	1,141	−1.75%	Chippewa
440	Brooklyn	1,117	1,108	+0.81%	Green
441	Lake	1,113	1,106	+0.63%	Price
442	Kewaskum	1,111	1,118	−0.63%	Washington
443	Milford	1,108	1,106	+0.18%	Jefferson
444	Kingston	1,107	1,079	+2.59%	Green Lake
445	Lomira	1,107	1,099	+0.73%	Dodge
446	Cedar Lake	1,106	1,076	+2.79%	Barron
447	Berlin	1,105	1,068	+3.46%	Green Lake
448	Wabeno	1,100	1,074	+2.42%	Forest
449	White River	1,098	986	+11.36%	Ashland
450	Portland	1,094	1,091	+0.27%	Dodge
451	Lincoln	1,093	1,125	−2.84%	Eau Claire
452	Cloverland	1,092	1,068	+2.25%	Vilas
453	Brussels	1,089	1,125	−3.20%	Door
454	Manchester	1,088	1,057	+2.93%	Green Lake
455	Cassian	1,086	1,069	+1.59%	Oneida
456	Bloomer	1,085	1,090	−0.46%	Chippewa
457	Townsend	1,084	1,044	+3.83%	Oconto
458	Hazel Green	1,082	1,084	−0.18%	Grant
459	Linwood	1,082	1,070	+1.12%	Portage
460	Hale	1,081	1,061	+1.89%	Trempealeau
461	Bashaw	1,080	1,079	+0.09%	Washburn
462	Easton	1,078	1,062	+1.51%	Adams
463	Eau Pleine	1,078	1,063	+1.41%	Portage
464	Boulder Junction	1,075	1,057	+1.70%	Vilas
465	Manitowoc	1,074	1,076	−0.19%	Manitowoc
466	Bloomfield	1,073	1,054	+1.80%	Waushara
467	Theresa	1,073	1,089	−1.47%	Dodge
468	Eden	1,062	1,000	+6.20%	Fond du Lac
469	Brigham	1,061	1,037	+2.31%	Iowa
470	Mazomanie	1,058	1,074	−1.49%	Dane
471	Baldwin	1,056	1,047	+0.86%	St. Croix
472	Forestville	1,056	1,063	−0.66%	Door
473	Gilman	1,056	1,006	+4.97%	Pierce
474	Hebron	1,054	1,043	+1.05%	Jefferson
475	Winter	1,053	1,000	+5.30%	Sawyer
476	Day	1,052	1,063	−1.03%	Marathon
477	Bevent	1,051	1,049	+0.19%	Marathon
478	Glenmore	1,050	1,045	+0.48%	Brown
479	Withee	1,050	1,033	+1.65%	Clark
480	Summit	1,048	1,030	+1.75%	Douglas
481	Laketown	1,047	1,024	+2.25%	Polk
482	Alto	1,046	1,055	−0.85%	Fond du Lac
483	Fairfield	1,046	1,078	−2.97%	Sauk
484	Center	1,044	1,046	−0.19%	Rock
485	Green Valley	1,044	1,026	+1.75%	Shawano
486	Prairie du Sac	1,044	1,076	−2.97%	Sauk
487	Alma	1,040	1,033	+0.68%	Jackson
488	Hortonia	1,040	1,052	−1.14%	Outagamie
489	Ludington	1,037	1,067	−2.81%	Eau Claire
490	Norrie	1,037	1,010	+2.67%	Marathon
491	Calamus	1,035	1,043	−0.77%	Dodge
492	Georgetown	1,034	1,036	−0.19%	Polk
493	Waukechon	1,034	1,002	+3.19%	Shawano
494	York	1,034	969	+6.71%	Green
495	Morgan	1,032	985	+4.77%	Oconto
496	Pigeon	1,031	1,018	+1.28%	Trempealeau
497	Seneca	1,030	1,039	−0.87%	Wood
498	Sumpter	1,030	1,055	−2.37%	Sauk
499	Minong	1,029	984	+4.57%	Washburn
500	Washington	1,028	1,021	+0.69%	Sauk
501	Delmar	1,027	1,013	+1.38%	Chippewa
502	Elba	1,027	1,041	−1.34%	Dodge
503	Saxeville	1,026	996	+3.01%	Waushara
504	Siren	1,026	1,004	+2.19%	Burnett
505	Clayton	1,024	1,052	−2.66%	Crawford
506	Montrose	1,024	1,064	−3.76%	Dane
507	Oakland	1,024	980	+4.49%	Burnett
508	Rudolph	1,022	1,027	−0.49%	Wood
509	Hawthorne	1,021	1,058	−3.50%	Douglas
510	Aurora	1,020	987	+3.34%	Florence
511	Aurora	1,020	1,006	+1.39%	Waushara
512	Oak Grove	1,020	1,028	−0.78%	Dodge
513	Woodmohr	1,019	1,004	+1.49%	Chippewa
514	Lowville	1,018	1,017	+0.10%	Columbia
515	Sigel	1,017	1,017	0.00%	Wood
516	Carlton	1,016	1,008	+0.79%	Kewaunee
517	Scandinavia	1,015	1,049	−3.24%	Waupaca
518	Cicero	1,013	1,008	+0.50%	Outagamie
519	Rock Creek	1,013	1,003	+1.00%	Dunn
520	Polar	1,012	1,018	−0.59%	Langlade
521	Lake Holcombe	1,010	1,011	−0.10%	Chippewa
522	Springfield	1,010	993	+1.71%	St. Croix
523	Chilton	1,008	1,059	−4.82%	Calumet
524	Sylvester	1,007	1,001	+0.60%	Green
525	Bridgeport	1,006	988	+1.82%	Crawford
526	Bradford	1,002	1,013	−1.09%	Rock
527	Union	998	1,005	−0.70%	Door
528	Red Springs	997	993	+0.40%	Shawano
529	Sampson	997	972	+2.57%	Chippewa
530	Wilton	997	963	+3.53%	Monroe
531	Solon Springs	996	970	+2.68%	Douglas
532	Christiana	995	993	+0.20%	Vernon
533	Big Flats	989	948	+4.32%	Adams
534	Porter	988	969	+1.96%	Rock
535	Sherman	986	922	+6.94%	Dunn
536	Gillett	985	989	−0.40%	Oconto
537	Mineral Point	984	974	+1.03%	Iowa
538	Luck	983	979	+0.41%	Polk
539	Grant	982	976	+0.61%	Shawano
540	Rockland	982	995	−1.31%	Manitowoc
541	Jackson	981	935	+4.92%	Burnett
542	Marathon	976	995	−1.91%	Marathon
543	Greenwood	975	923	+5.63%	Vernon
544	Franklin	974	964	+1.04%	Kewaunee
545	Darlington	973	923	+5.42%	Lafayette
546	King	973	964	+0.93%	Lincoln
547	Berlin	971	949	+2.32%	Marathon
548	Forest	971	975	−0.41%	Fond du Lac
549	Elk	970	960	+1.04%	Price
550	Hamburg	966	956	+1.05%	Vernon
551	Land o' Lakes	966	944	+2.33%	Vilas
552	Clayton	965	958	+0.73%	Polk
553	Dewey	965	962	+0.31%	Portage
554	Oak Grove	963	960	+0.31%	Barron
555	Preston	961	942	+2.02%	Trempealeau
556	Oxford	960	930	+3.23%	Marquette
557	Spruce	958	918	+4.36%	Oconto
558	Sand Lake	957	901	+6.22%	Sawyer
559	Arpin	955	942	+1.38%	Wood
560	Schley	953	950	+0.32%	Lincoln
561	Mayville	951	963	−1.25%	Clark
562	Trade Lake	950	904	+5.09%	Burnett
563	Flambeau	949	987	−3.85%	Rusk
564	Lakeland	947	938	+0.96%	Barron
565	Somers	947	992	−4.54%	Kenosha
566	LeRoy	946	956	−1.05%	Dodge
567	Trego	946	908	+4.19%	Washburn
568	Caledonia	944	928	+1.72%	Trempealeau
569	Cassel	943	934	+0.96%	Marathon
570	Poy Sippi	941	919	+2.39%	Waushara
571	Harmony	940	882	+6.58%	Vernon
572	Maple Grove	940	939	+0.11%	Shawano
573	Rib Falls	940	947	−0.74%	Marathon
574	Wood River	935	898	+4.12%	Burnett
575	Lincoln	933	932	+0.11%	Kewaunee
576	Holway	930	930	0.00%	Taylor
577	Iola	927	938	−1.17%	Waupaca
578	Dane	926	934	−0.86%	Dane
579	Seneca	923	932	−0.97%	Crawford
580	Prairie du Chien	921	957	−3.76%	Crawford
581	Pella	919	899	+2.22%	Shawano
582	Spring Grove	918	919	−0.11%	Green
583	Cady	916	880	+4.09%	St. Croix
584	Burns	915	946	−3.28%	La Crosse
585	Hixon	915	902	+1.44%	Clark
586	Emmet	914	905	+0.99%	Marathon
587	Wascott	912	912	0.00%	Douglas
588	Lisbon	909	1,750	−48.06%	Juneau
589	Norwood	909	907	+0.22%	Langlade
590	Fifield	908	905	+0.33%	Price
591	Browning	905	910	−0.55%	Taylor
592	Matteson	903	914	−1.20%	Waupaca
593	Blue Mounds	899	899	0.00%	Dane
594	Colburn	897	892	+0.56%	Chippewa
595	Pembine	895	877	+2.05%	Marinette
596	Cable	894	853	+4.81%	Bayfield
597	Middle Inlet	894	851	+5.05%	Marinette
598	Cleveland	892	889	+0.34%	Chippewa
599	Clear Lake	891	888	+0.34%	Polk
600	Stanton	890	907	−1.87%	St. Croix
601	Scott	888	857	+3.62%	Columbia
602	Longwood	885	877	+0.91%	Clark
603	Vermont	885	871	+1.61%	Dane
604	Willow Springs	885	789	+12.17%	Lafayette
605	Ahnapee	882	870	+1.38%	Kewaunee
606	Jacksonport	882	878	+0.46%	Door
607	Winfield	882	890	−0.90%	Sauk
608	Greenfield	881	909	−3.08%	Sauk
609	Clinton	878	889	−1.24%	Rock
610	Colby	876	922	−4.99%	Clark
611	Fountain Prairie	876	938	−6.61%	Columbia
612	Waterloo	876	867	+1.04%	Jefferson
613	Wien	876	885	−1.02%	Marathon
614	Wiota	875	830	+5.42%	Lafayette
615	Pine Grove	874	873	+0.11%	Portage
616	Almena	871	887	−1.80%	Barron
617	Portland	871	833	+4.56%	Monroe
618	Lakewood	869	831	+4.57%	Oconto
619	Niagara	869	852	+2.00%	Marinette
620	Jefferson	868	841	+3.21%	Monroe
621	Underhill	868	864	+0.46%	Oconto
622	Clinton	867	870	−0.34%	Barron
623	Irving	866	853	+1.52%	Jackson
624	Alban	865	863	+0.23%	Portage
625	Thorp	865	840	+2.98%	Clark
626	Woodland	865	839	+3.10%	Sauk
627	Lynn	864	834	+3.60%	Clark
628	South Lancaster	864	884	−2.26%	Grant
629	Waterville	863	829	+4.10%	Pepin
630	Rietbrock	862	874	−1.37%	Marathon
631	Barnes	860	823	+4.50%	Bayfield
632	Grant	860	858	+0.23%	Clark
633	Maple Grove	858	877	−2.17%	Barron
634	Mountain	858	832	+3.13%	Oconto
635	Webster	858	821	+4.51%	Vernon
636	Johnson	855	873	−2.06%	Marathon
637	Washington	853	842	+1.31%	Green
638	Riverview	852	819	+4.03%	Oconto
639	Emerald	850	831	+2.29%	St. Croix
640	Maple Plain	850	844	+0.71%	Barron
641	Maine	849	851	−0.24%	Outagamie
642	Wittenberg	849	823	+3.16%	Shawano
643	Sumner	847	840	+0.83%	Trempealeau
644	Hartland	845	830	+1.81%	Pierce
645	Spooner	845	827	+2.18%	Washburn
646	Sharon	844	861	−1.97%	Walworth
647	Beaver	842	826	+1.94%	Clark
648	Holton	841	859	−2.10%	Marathon
649	Sherman	838	831	+0.84%	Clark
650	Beaver Brook	837	795	+5.28%	Washburn
651	Hartland	835	824	+1.33%	Shawano
652	Liberty	835	826	+1.09%	Outagamie
653	Swiss	835	807	+3.47%	Burnett
654	Neva	834	846	−1.42%	Langlade
655	Springfield	832	811	+2.59%	Marquette
656	Corning	830	825	+0.61%	Lincoln
657	Sumner	829	846	−2.01%	Jefferson
658	Belmont	827	794	+4.16%	Lafayette
659	Union	826	809	+2.10%	Vernon
660	Douglas	824	784	+5.10%	Marquette
661	Hamburg	824	827	−0.36%	Marathon
662	Woodboro	824	808	+1.98%	Oneida
663	York	824	844	−2.37%	Clark
664	Presque Isle	822	805	+2.11%	Vilas
665	Woodville	822	850	−3.29%	Calumet
666	Eaton	821	814	+0.86%	Manitowoc
667	Barron	817	813	+0.49%	Barron
668	Cumberland	817	818	−0.12%	Barron
669	Potosi	817	813	+0.49%	Grant
670	Harrison	815	828	−1.57%	Lincoln
671	Bartelme	814	810	+0.49%	Shawano
672	Burnett	813	831	−2.17%	Dodge
673	Hillsboro	811	787	+3.05%	Vernon
674	Fort Winnebago	810	812	−0.25%	Columbia
675	Bayfield	809	787	+2.80%	Bayfield
676	Rock	809	787	+2.80%	Wood
677	Sturgeon Bay	809	821	−1.46%	Door
678	Wolf River	808	783	+3.19%	Langlade
679	Beaver	807	798	+1.13%	Polk
680	Lincoln	806	793	+1.64%	Monroe
681	Westfield	806	789	+2.15%	Marquette
682	Dovre	805	825	−2.42%	Barron
683	Manchester	801	825	−2.91%	Jackson
684	Eau Galle	799	765	+4.44%	Dunn
685	Arlington	796	803	−0.87%	Columbia
686	Hoard	796	787	+1.14%	Clark
687	Lincoln	796	779	+2.18%	Trempealeau
688	Beecher	795	786	+1.15%	Marinette
689	Howard	794	777	+2.19%	Chippewa
690	Maple Grove	793	773	+2.59%	Manitowoc
691	Smelser	793	786	+0.89%	Grant
692	Auburndale	792	790	+0.25%	Wood
693	Reseburg	792	793	−0.13%	Clark
694	Hunter	791	779	+1.54%	Sawyer
695	La Prairie	784	784	0.00%	Rock
696	Auburn	783	776	+0.90%	Chippewa
697	Goetz	782	813	−3.81%	Chippewa
698	Marshfield	782	763	+2.49%	Wood
699	Pepin	781	741	+5.40%	Pepin
700	Drammen	780	792	−1.52%	Eau Claire
701	Stanton	780	758	+2.90%	Dunn
702	Union	780	778	+0.26%	Waupaca
703	Washington	780	777	+0.39%	Door
704	Dupont	778	746	+4.29%	Waupaca
705	Lima	777	771	+0.78%	Grant
706	Loyal	777	790	−1.65%	Clark
707	Garfield	774	756	+2.38%	Jackson
708	Pierce	770	772	−0.26%	Kewaunee
709	Arthur	769	771	−0.26%	Chippewa
710	Harris	769	748	+2.81%	Marquette
711	Mecan	769	752	+2.26%	Marquette
712	Sherry	769	755	+1.85%	Wood
713	Johnstown	768	766	+0.26%	Rock
714	Eau Pleine	767	769	−0.26%	Marathon
715	Gingles	767	738	+3.93%	Ashland
716	Richford	767	737	+4.07%	Waushara
717	Muscoda	766	754	+1.59%	Grant
718	Troy	766	781	−1.92%	Sauk
719	Barksdale	763	745	+2.42%	Bayfield
720	Oakdale	763	754	+1.19%	Monroe
721	Coon	762	729	+4.53%	Vernon
722	Cooks Valley	761	757	+0.53%	Chippewa
723	Randolph	761	762	−0.13%	Columbia
724	Genoa	760	753	+0.93%	Vernon
725	Rib Lake	760	763	−0.39%	Taylor
726	West Sweden	760	744	+2.15%	Polk
727	Wood	760	757	+0.40%	Wood
728	Lena	759	743	+2.15%	Oconto
729	Hull	758	756	+0.26%	Marathon
730	Kickapoo	755	722	+4.57%	Vernon
731	El Paso	755	724	+4.28%	Pierce
732	Adrian	753	733	+2.73%	Monroe
733	Albany	752	716	+5.03%	Pepin
734	Glenwood	752	747	+0.67%	St. Croix
735	Gordon	750	757	−0.92%	Douglas
736	Armenia	749	705	+6.24%	Juneau
737	Clear Creek	749	778	−3.73%	Eau Claire
738	Clifton	749	733	+2.18%	Monroe
739	Herman	748	739	+1.22%	Shawano
740	Crystal Lake	747	743	+0.54%	Barron
741	Unity	747	751	−0.53%	Clark
742	Green Grove	746	748	−0.27%	Clark
743	Grant	744	732	+1.64%	Rusk
744	Eileen	743	722	+2.91%	Bayfield
745	Leeds	743	755	−1.59%	Columbia
746	Magnolia	743	742	+0.13%	Rock
747	Rosendale	743	738	+0.68%	Fond du Lac
748	Worden	742	708	+4.80%	Clark
749	Mosel	741	748	−0.94%	Sheboygan
750	Buffalo	738	746	−1.07%	Buffalo
751	Cadiz	738	747	−1.20%	Green
752	Highland	738	724	+1.93%	Iowa
753	Bear Creek	737	748	−1.47%	Waupaca
754	Hansen	737	747	−1.34%	Wood
755	Linden	737	755	−2.38%	Iowa
756	Rantoul	737	740	−0.41%	Calumet
757	Beetown	736	723	+1.80%	Grant
758	Charlestown	735	774	−5.04%	Calumet
759	Sterling	735	724	+1.52%	Polk
760	Eastman	733	731	+0.27%	Crawford
761	Freeman	732	727	+0.69%	Crawford
762	Coloma	731	730	+0.14%	Waushara
763	Bergen	729	740	−1.49%	Marathon
764	Durand	729	710	+2.68%	Pepin
765	Cold Spring	728	737	−1.22%	Jefferson
766	Ogema	727	727	0.00%	Price
767	Spring Valley	727	728	−0.14%	Rock
768	Perry	725	737	−1.63%	Dane
769	Glendale	724	663	+9.20%	Monroe
770	Weston	724	686	+5.54%	Clark
771	St. Lawrence	723	714	+1.26%	Waupaca
772	Upham	723	726	−0.41%	Langlade
773	Honey Creek	722	749	−3.60%	Sauk
774	Clearfield	721	702	+2.71%	Juneau
775	Naples	721	697	+3.44%	Buffalo
776	New Hope	721	711	+1.41%	Portage
777	Primrose	719	750	−4.13%	Dane
778	Nepeuskun	718	724	−0.83%	Winnebago
779	Thornapple	718	721	−0.42%	Rusk
780	Clyman	716	712	+0.56%	Dodge
781	Breed	715	698	+2.44%	Oconto
782	Arland	713	712	+0.14%	Barron
783	Eaton	713	718	−0.70%	Clark
784	Sumner	712	699	+1.86%	Barron
785	Chelsea	711	710	+0.14%	Taylor
786	New Haven	708	680	+4.12%	Adams
787	Daniels	707	676	+4.59%	Burnett
788	Kildare	707	690	+2.46%	Juneau
789	Amberg	706	693	+1.88%	Marinette
790	Hammel	706	703	+0.43%	Taylor
791	Stanfold	706	701	+0.71%	Barron
792	Maple	704	700	+0.57%	Douglas
793	New Haven	704	673	+4.61%	Dunn
794	Russell	704	693	+1.59%	Lincoln
795	Lucas	703	698	+0.72%	Dunn
796	Westboro	702	693	+1.30%	Taylor
797	Bone Lake	701	686	+2.19%	Polk
798	Lima	701	693	+1.15%	Pepin
799	Cylon	700	708	−1.13%	St. Croix
800	Albion	695	694	+0.14%	Trempealeau
801	Birnamwood	694	682	+1.76%	Shawano
802	Rose	694	661	+4.99%	Waushara
803	Sioux Creek	693	667	+3.90%	Barron
804	Vance Creek	691	689	+0.29%	Barron
805	Helvetia	690	701	−1.57%	Waupaca
806	Metomen	689	689	0.00%	Fond du Lac
807	Oakfield	689	681	+1.17%	Fond du Lac
808	Lakeside	688	681	+1.03%	Douglas
809	Greenfield	687	677	+1.48%	Monroe
810	Wonewoc	687	677	+1.48%	Juneau
811	Northfield	686	674	+1.78%	Jackson
812	Springfield	683	693	−1.44%	Jackson
813	Springvale	683	675	+1.19%	Fond du Lac
814	Rockbridge	682	697	−2.15%	Richland
815	Warren	681	656	+3.81%	Waushara
816	Plover	680	683	−0.44%	Marathon
817	Deerfield	677	667	+1.50%	Waushara
818	Summit	676	666	+1.50%	Juneau
819	Wagner	674	653	+3.22%	Marinette
820	Bear Lake	673	670	+0.45%	Barron
821	Wellington	673	666	+1.05%	Monroe
822	Dayton	672	763	−11.93%	Richland
823	Maple Valley	669	647	+3.40%	Oconto
824	Erin Prairie	668	673	−0.74%	St. Croix
825	Paris	668	655	+1.98%	Grant
826	York	667	697	−4.30%	Dane
827	Sheldon	666	649	+2.62%	Monroe
828	Chester	664	895	−25.81%	Dodge
829	Whitestown	664	623	+6.58%	Vernon
830	Deer Creek	662	677	−2.22%	Taylor
831	Marshall	661	664	−0.45%	Rusk
832	Milladore	661	668	−1.05%	Wood
833	Jacobs	660	648	+1.85%	Ashland
834	Lindina	657	685	−4.09%	Juneau
835	Otsego	656	670	−2.09%	Columbia
836	Franklin	652	668	−2.40%	Sauk
837	Halsey	652	634	+2.84%	Marathon
838	Hay River	650	327	+98.78%	Dunn
839	Marion	650	629	+3.34%	Grant
840	Weston	649	657	−1.22%	Marathon
841	Bennett	648	632	+2.53%	Douglas
842	Long Lake	648	628	+3.18%	Washburn
843	Manitowish Waters	647	624	+3.69%	Vilas
844	Ironton	646	662	−2.42%	Sauk
845	Tiffany	643	617	+4.21%	Dunn
846	Centerville	641	631	+1.58%	Manitowoc
847	Hewitt	640	636	+0.63%	Marathon
848	Forest	638	638	0.00%	St. Croix
849	Forest	638	617	+3.40%	Vernon
850	Frankfort	638	635	+0.47%	Marathon
851	Turtle Lake	637	640	−0.47%	Barron
852	Elderon	634	644	−1.55%	Marathon
853	Mount Pleasant	634	619	+2.42%	Green
854	Ithaca	631	633	−0.32%	Richland
855	Warner	631	635	−0.63%	Clark
856	Bear Creek	630	641	−1.72%	Sauk
857	Crandon	630	606	+3.96%	Forest
858	Utica	628	623	+0.80%	Crawford
859	Columbus	625	626	−0.16%	Columbia
860	Deer Creek	625	630	−0.79%	Outagamie
861	Eisenstein	624	625	−0.16%	Price
862	Birchwood	622	605	+2.81%	Washburn
863	Fremont	621	627	−0.96%	Waupaca
864	Almond	620	625	−0.80%	Portage
865	Hixton	620	620	0.00%	Jackson
866	Rock Falls	619	635	−2.52%	Lincoln
867	Spring Lake	619	598	+3.51%	Pierce
868	Bern	618	614	+0.65%	Marathon
869	Goodman	616	607	+1.48%	Marinette
870	Hickory Grove	615	568	+8.27%	Grant
871	Greenwood	614	621	−1.13%	Taylor
872	Dunbar	611	605	+0.99%	Marinette
873	Maiden Rock	610	591	+3.21%	Pierce
874	Bangor	609	617	−1.30%	La Crosse
875	Gratiot	609	575	+5.91%	Lafayette
876	Scott	609	583	+4.46%	Burnett
877	Belmont	607	623	−2.57%	Portage
878	Jordan	605	602	+0.50%	Green
879	Ellenboro	604	580	+4.14%	Grant
880	Fennimore	604	594	+1.68%	Grant
881	Sand Creek	603	603	0.00%	Dunn
882	Brule	602	607	−0.82%	Douglas
883	Sand Lake	601	576	+4.34%	Burnett
884	Union	601	602	−0.17%	Pierce
885	Brighton	600	620	−3.23%	Marathon
886	Wheatland	598	588	+1.70%	Vernon
887	Ashland	597	589	+1.36%	Ashland
888	Bass Lake	595	566	+5.12%	Washburn
889	Edgewater	595	565	+5.31%	Sawyer
890	Elk Grove	595	566	+5.12%	Lafayette
891	Newport	592	607	−2.47%	Columbia
892	Fountain	590	592	−0.34%	Juneau
893	Shields	588	585	+0.51%	Marquette
894	Maple Creek	586	591	−0.85%	Outagamie
895	Washburn	585	554	+5.60%	Bayfield
896	Wells	584	562	+3.91%	Monroe
897	Oulu	582	560	+3.93%	Bayfield
898	Almon	581	575	+1.04%	Shawano
899	Moscow	581	582	−0.17%	Iowa
900	Nelson	581	574	+1.22%	Buffalo
901	Mifflin	577	558	+3.41%	Iowa
902	Stella	577	569	+1.41%	Oneida
903	Hancock	573	558	+2.69%	Waushara
904	La Follette	573	559	+2.50%	Burnett
905	Plum Lake	573	553	+3.62%	Vilas
906	Prairie Farm	573	566	+1.24%	Barron
907	Ridgeway	573	563	+1.78%	Iowa
908	Westfield	573	582	−1.55%	Sauk
909	Avon	572	570	+0.35%	Rock
910	Dewey	572	545	+4.95%	Burnett
911	Plymouth	572	578	−1.04%	Juneau
912	Argonne	571	546	+4.58%	Forest
913	Birch	570	570	0.00%	Lincoln
914	Hampden	570	581	−1.89%	Columbia
915	Pleasant Valley	570	567	+0.53%	St. Croix
916	Waterloo	570	552	+3.26%	Grant
917	Rusk	569	551	+3.27%	Rusk
918	Atlanta	568	560	+1.43%	Rusk
919	Clam Falls	568	554	+2.53%	Polk
920	Weston	568	574	−1.05%	Dunn
921	Neshkoro	566	565	+0.18%	Marquette
922	North Lancaster	566	581	−2.58%	Grant
923	Athelstane	565	554	+1.99%	Marinette
924	Dallas	561	570	−1.58%	Barron
925	Drummond	561	544	+3.13%	Bayfield
926	Franzen	560	553	+1.27%	Marathon
927	Mount Ida	559	561	−0.36%	Grant
928	Mentor	558	546	+2.20%	Clark
929	Dewey	554	542	+2.21%	Rusk
930	Sterling	550	550	0.00%	Vernon
931	Cameron	548	539	+1.67%	Wood
932	Scott	548	519	+5.59%	Crawford
933	Liberty	546	543	+0.55%	Grant
934	Newton	546	529	+3.21%	Marquette
935	Adams	545	540	+0.93%	Green
936	Moundville	545	526	+3.61%	Marquette
937	Weyauwega	545	567	−3.88%	Waupaca
938	Milton	542	541	+0.18%	Buffalo
939	Madge	541	532	+1.69%	Washburn
940	Orange	541	540	+0.19%	Juneau
941	Winchester	540	528	+2.27%	Vilas
942	Bayview	538	512	+5.08%	Bayfield
943	Orion	538	541	−0.55%	Richland
944	Springvale	537	539	−0.37%	Columbia
945	Marshall	536	540	−0.74%	Richland
946	How	535	527	+1.52%	Oconto
947	Stubbs	535	523	+2.29%	Rusk
948	Unity	534	511	+4.50%	Trempealeau
949	Bloom	533	538	−0.93%	Richland
950	Fairbanks	533	538	−0.93%	Shawano
951	Harrison	533	529	+0.76%	Grant
952	Franklin	532	519	+2.50%	Jackson
953	Silver Cliff	532	514	+3.50%	Marinette
954	Willard	531	525	+1.14%	Rusk
955	Benton	528	474	+11.39%	Lafayette
956	Grand View	528	508	+3.94%	Bayfield
957	Otter Creek	527	498	+5.82%	Dunn
958	Marquette	526	523	+0.57%	Green Lake
959	Wilson	525	504	+4.17%	Dunn
960	Stone Lake	524	515	+1.75%	Washburn
961	Sylvan	524	516	+1.55%	Richland
962	Green Valley	523	515	+1.55%	Marathon
963	Aniwa	520	517	+0.58%	Shawano
964	Dover	519	515	+0.78%	Buffalo
965	Springbrook	519	504	+2.98%	Washburn
966	Richwood	517	527	−1.90%	Richland
967	Cleveland	515	530	−2.83%	Jackson
968	Morse	514	499	+3.01%	Ashland
969	Westford	510	516	−1.16%	Richland
970	Mackford	509	495	+2.83%	Green Lake
971	Birch Creek	508	495	+2.63%	Chippewa
972	Washington	507	519	−2.31%	La Crosse
973	Plainfield	506	496	+2.02%	Waushara
974	Seneca	506	495	+2.22%	Shawano
975	Hutchins	505	500	+1.00%	Shawano
976	Shields	504	503	+0.20%	Dodge
977	Black Earth	500	510	−1.96%	Dane
978	Willow	500	496	+0.81%	Richland
979	Burnside	499	507	−1.58%	Trempealeau
980	Marietta	499	507	−1.58%	Crawford
981	Komensky	498	505	−1.39%	Jackson
982	New Diggings	498	486	+2.47%	Lafayette
983	Diamond Bluff	497	478	+3.97%	Pierce
984	Johnstown	497	499	−0.40%	Polk
985	Wayne	495	474	+4.43%	Lafayette
986	Argyle	494	449	+10.02%	Lafayette
987	Doyle	494	490	+0.82%	Barron
988	Waumandee	493	508	−2.95%	Buffalo
989	Rush River	491	500	−1.80%	St. Croix
990	Eagle	490	492	−0.41%	Richland
991	Flambeau	490	488	+0.41%	Price
992	Kimball	489	490	−0.20%	Iron
993	Ridgeville	489	479	+2.09%	Monroe
994	North Bend	488	491	−0.61%	Jackson
995	Ainsworth	486	477	+1.89%	Langlade
996	Rusk	486	470	+3.40%	Burnett
997	Salem	486	475	+2.32%	Pierce
998	Grant	485	469	+3.41%	Monroe
999	Hughes	485	471	+2.97%	Bayfield
1,000	Courtland	483	491	−1.63%	Columbia
1,001	Ackley	478	467	+2.36%	Langlade
1,002	Marengo	478	460	+3.91%	Ashland
1,003	Ruby	478	465	+2.80%	Chippewa
1,004	Sheridan	477	460	+3.70%	Dunn
1,005	Roosevelt	476	478	−0.42%	Taylor
1,006	Tomahawk	470	458	+2.62%	Lincoln
1,007	Barronett	469	461	+1.74%	Washburn
1,008	Crystal Lake	469	452	+3.76%	Marquette
1,009	Melrose	467	470	−0.64%	Jackson
1,010	Estella	466	476	−2.10%	Chippewa
1,011	Evergreen	466	462	+0.87%	Langlade
1,012	Kendall	465	402	+15.67%	Lafayette
1,013	Harrison	464	459	+1.09%	Waupaca
1,014	Goodrich	463	460	+0.65%	Taylor
1,015	Langlade	461	469	−1.71%	Langlade
1,016	La Pointe	456	428	+6.54%	Ashland
1,017	Spider Lake	457	487	−6.16%	Sawyer
1,018	Freedom	453	449	+0.89%	Sauk
1,019	Kelly	453	436	+3.90%	Bayfield
1,020	Waldwick	453	460	−1.52%	Iowa
1,021	Marion	452	444	+1.80%	Juneau
1,022	Mondovi	452	451	+0.22%	Buffalo
1,023	Webb Lake	451	432	+4.40%	Burnett
1,024	Aurora	448	459	−2.40%	Taylor
1,025	Radisson	448	445	+0.67%	Sawyer
1,026	Rock Elm	446	447	−0.22%	Pierce
1,027	Fairchild	445	450	−1.11%	Eau Claire
1,028	Grow	442	443	−0.23%	Rusk
1,029	Levis	440	437	+0.69%	Clark
1,030	Prentice	436	440	−0.91%	Price
1,031	Armstrong Creek	435	422	+3.08%	Forest
1,032	Wilson	435	427	+1.87%	Eau Claire
1,033	Hendren	434	433	+0.23%	Clark
1,034	Henrietta	434	435	−0.23%	Richland
1,035	Anderson	432	408	+5.88%	Burnett
1,036	Waubeek	431	423	+1.89%	Pepin
1,037	Sarona	430	419	+2.63%	Washburn
1,038	Navarino	424	413	+2.66%	Shawano
1,039	Glencoe	423	402	+5.22%	Buffalo
1,040	Otter Creek	422	427	−1.17%	Eau Claire
1,041	Gilmanton	419	425	−1.41%	Buffalo
1,042	Big Bend	418	401	+4.24%	Rusk
1,043	West Marshland	415	400	+3.75%	Burnett
1,044	Seymour	414	392	+5.61%	Lafayette
1,045	Monroe	413	391	+5.63%	Adams
1,046	Couderay	412	393	+4.83%	Sawyer
1,047	Clifton	409	380	+7.63%	Grant
1,048	Commonwealth	407	390	+4.36%	Florence
1,049	Cary	405	406	−0.25%	Wood
1,050	Port Wing	404	389	+3.86%	Bayfield
1,051	McKinley	403	408	−1.23%	Taylor
1,052	Casey	401	396	+1.26%	Washburn
1,053	Cassville	401	402	−0.25%	Grant
1,054	Bell	400	355	+12.68%	Bayfield
1,055	Dodge	400	394	+1.52%	Trempealeau
1,056	Homestead	400	383	+4.44%	Florence
1,057	Grant	399	395	+1.01%	Dunn
1,058	Akan	393	391	+0.51%	Richland
1,059	Lafayette	393	447	−12.08%	Monroe
1,060	Fayette	392	381	+2.89%	Lafayette
1,061	Two Creeks	392	390	+0.51%	Manitowoc
1,062	Keystone	388	373	+4.02%	Bayfield
1,063	Little Rice	388	388	0.00%	Oneida
1,064	Wingville	388	378	+2.65%	Grant
1,065	Schoepke	387	388	−0.26%	Oneida
1,066	Seneca	387	387	0.00%	Green Lake
1,067	Belvidere	385	403	−4.47%	Buffalo
1,068	Oasis	385	384	+0.26%	Waushara
1,069	Cross	382	368	+3.80%	Buffalo
1,070	Morris	382	374	+2.14%	Shawano
1,071	Skanawan	381	386	−1.30%	Lincoln
1,072	Garden Valley	379	395	−4.05%	Jackson
1,073	Boscobel	377	379	−0.53%	Grant
1,074	Hill	377	366	+3.01%	Price
1,075	Lincoln	377	367	+2.72%	Burnett
1,076	Agenda	376	370	+1.62%	Ashland
1,077	Clay Banks	376	385	−2.34%	Door
1,078	Watterstown	375	372	+0.81%	Grant
1,079	Hiles	374	359	+4.18%	Forest
1,080	Russell	374	384	−2.60%	Sheboygan
1,081	Mead	373	357	+4.48%	Clark
1,082	Washington	373	360	+3.61%	Rusk
1,083	Dexter	372	350	+6.29%	Wood
1,084	Stark	371	351	+5.70%	Vernon
1,085	Wauzeka	370	376	−1.60%	Crawford
1,086	Patch Grove	368	364	+1.10%	Grant
1,087	Glen Haven	367	363	+1.10%	Grant
1,088	St. Marie	365	352	+3.69%	Green Lake
1,089	Harding	364	364	0.00%	Lincoln
1,090	Union	364	345	+5.51%	Burnett
1,091	Liberty	360	341	+5.57%	Vernon
1,092	Kennan	359	365	−1.64%	Price
1,093	Pulaski	359	357	+0.56%	Iowa
1,094	Dewhurst	354	349	+1.43%	Clark
1,095	Chippewa	353	349	+1.15%	Ashland
1,096	Forest	351	333	+5.41%	Richland
1,097	McKinley	351	340	+3.24%	Polk
1,098	Guenther	350	358	−2.23%	Marathon
1,099	Seven Mile Creek	349	348	+0.29%	Juneau
1,100	Highland	348	340	+2.35%	Douglas
1,101	Germania	345	343	+0.58%	Shawano
1,102	Enterprise	344	353	−2.55%	Oneida
1,103	Maplehurst	342	338	+1.18%	Taylor
1,104	Lincoln	340	320	+6.25%	Adams
1,105	Frankfort	339	325	+4.31%	Pepin
1,106	Freedom	337	324	+4.01%	Forest
1,107	Peck	336	324	+3.70%	Langlade
1,108	Wyalusing	336	336	0.00%	Grant
1,109	Blanchard	334	300	+11.33%	Lafayette
1,110	Delta	332	315	+5.40%	Bayfield
1,111	Eden	332	339	−2.06%	Iowa
1,112	Shullsburg	331	312	+6.09%	Lafayette
1,113	Namakagon	330	316	+4.43%	Bayfield
1,114	Bloomington	329	331	−0.60%	Grant
1,115	Lamont	327	313	+4.47%	Lafayette
1,116	Maxville	325	321	+1.25%	Buffalo
1,117	Wyoming	324	317	+2.21%	Iowa
1,118	Wilson	322	317	+1.58%	Lincoln
1,119	Doty	321	309	+3.88%	Oconto
1,120	Knox	321	311	+3.22%	Price
1,121	Little Grant	321	314	+2.23%	Grant
1,122	Ojibwa	321	307	+4.56%	Sawyer
1,123	Oma	320	320	0.00%	Iron
1,124	Taft	319	310	+2.90%	Taylor
1,125	Lorain	316	308	+2.60%	Polk
1,126	Brooklyn	315	311	+1.29%	Washburn
1,127	Emery	315	308	+2.27%	Price
1,128	Weirgor	314	311	+0.96%	Sawyer
1,129	Harrison	309	312	−0.96%	Marathon
1,130	Chicog	307	292	+5.14%	Washburn
1,131	Haney	307	317	−3.15%	Crawford
1,132	Modena	307	313	−1.92%	Buffalo
1,133	Lawrence	306	301	+1.66%	Rusk
1,134	Wyoming	306	318	−3.77%	Waupaca
1,135	Clyde	305	292	+4.45%	Iowa
1,136	Leola	304	287	+5.92%	Adams
1,137	Molitor	304	308	−1.30%	Taylor
1,138	Knapp	303	303	0.00%	Jackson
1,139	Mason	303	289	+4.84%	Bayfield
1,140	Spirit	303	292	+3.77%	Price
1,141	Curran	299	301	−0.66%	Jackson
1,142	Cutler	296	300	−1.33%	Juneau
1,143	Washburn	294	289	+1.73%	Clark
1,144	Crystal	293	280	+4.64%	Washburn
1,145	Hewett	289	295	−2.03%	Clark
1,146	Saxon	285	290	−1.72%	Iron
1,147	Mount Hope	282	282	0.00%	Grant
1,148	Sherman	282	286	−1.40%	Iron
1,149	Bagley	280	275	+1.82%	Oconto
1,150	Strickland	278	280	−0.71%	Rusk
1,151	Isabelle	274	261	+4.98%	Pierce
1,152	Montana	274	268	+2.24%	Buffalo
1,153	Monico	269	260	+3.46%	Oneida
1,154	Clover	268	261	+2.68%	Bayfield
1,155	Jump River	268	275	−2.55%	Taylor
1,156	Gordon	263	261	+0.77%	Ashland
1,157	Alma	261	254	+2.76%	Buffalo
1,158	Ford	260	265	−1.89%	Taylor
1,159	Lincoln	260	251	+3.59%	Bayfield
1,160	Tripp	255	244	+4.51%	Bayfield
1,161	Chimney Rock	252	258	−2.33%	Trempealeau
1,162	Castle Rock	251	240	+4.58%	Grant
1,163	Murry	250	247	+1.21%	Rusk
1,164	Canton	249	245	+1.63%	Buffalo
1,165	Catawba	245	247	−0.81%	Price
1,166	Peru	243	233	+4.29%	Dunn
1,167	Draper	242	241	+0.41%	Sawyer
1,168	Cloverland	240	249	−3.61%	Douglas
1,169	Germantown	240	241	−0.41%	Washington
1,170	True	235	237	−0.84%	Rusk
1,171	Stockholm	233	218	+6.88%	Pepin
1,172	Sherwood	232	230	+0.87%	Clark
1,173	Colburn	228	215	+6.05%	Adams
1,174	Vilas	226	226	0.00%	Langlade
1,175	Remington	224	230	−2.61%	Wood
1,176	Pilsen	221	217	+1.84%	Bayfield
1,177	Cleveland	220	216	+1.85%	Taylor
1,178	Price	218	221	−1.36%	Langlade
1,179	Harmony	217	220	−1.36%	Price
1,180	Grover	215	208	+3.37%	Taylor
1,181	Stinnett	211	207	+1.93%	Washburn
1,182	Blaine	210	206	+1.94%	Burnett
1,183	Pershing	209	201	+3.98%	Taylor
1,184	Blackwell	206	152	+35.53%	Forest
1,185	Knight	204	212	−3.77%	Iron
1,186	Roosevelt	203	197	+3.05%	Burnett
1,187	Gull Lake	201	198	+1.52%	Washburn
1,188	Dairyland	197	211	−6.64%	Douglas
1,189	Seif	197	188	+4.79%	Clark
1,190	New Lyme	196	193	+1.55%	Monroe
1,191	Fern	194	181	+7.18%	Florence
1,192	Richland	194	197	−1.52%	Rusk
1,193	Fence	189	183	+3.28%	Florence
1,194	Bloomfield	187	1,778	−89.48%	Walworth
1,195	Hallie	187	153	+22.22%	Chippewa
1,196	Hackett	181	189	−4.23%	Price
1,197	City Point	180	177	+1.69%	Jackson
1,198	Long Lake	180	178	+1.12%	Florence
1,199	Hubbard	177	178	−0.56%	Rusk
1,200	Alvin	175	173	+1.16%	Forest
1,201	Cranmoor	173	181	−4.42%	Wood
1,202	Meteor	173	156	+10.90%	Sawyer
1,203	Georgetown	171	172	−0.58%	Price
1,204	Woodman	170	158	+7.59%	Grant
1,205	Orienta	169	164	+3.05%	Bayfield
1,206	Lincoln	168	167	+0.60%	Buffalo
1,207	Carey	165	172	−4.07%	Iron
1,208	Tipler	165	160	+3.13%	Florence
1,209	Millston	162	168	−3.57%	Jackson
1,210	Pence	153	160	−4.37%	Iron
1,211	Bear Bluff	151	155	−2.58%	Jackson
1,212	Hiles	151	152	−0.66%	Wood
1,213	Summit	147	143	+2.80%	Langlade
1,214	Monticello	146	138	+5.80%	Lafayette
1,215	Meadowbrook	145	134	+8.21%	Sawyer
1,216	Gurney	142	145	−2.07%	Iron
1,217	Richfield	142	138	+2.90%	Adams
1,218	Lynne	138	139	−0.72%	Oneida
1,219	Peeksville	138	137	+0.73%	Ashland
1,220	Frog Creek	133	127	+4.72%	Washburn
1,221	Ross	132	132	0.00%	Forest
1,222	Somo	129	123	+4.88%	Lincoln
1,223	Millville	128	127	+0.79%	Grant
1,224	Shanagolden	127	131	−3.05%	Ashland
1,225	Hawkins	123	122	+0.82%	Rusk
1,226	Foster	121	118	+2.54%	Clark
1,227	South Fork	121	115	+5.22%	Rusk
1,228	Wilson	117	116	+0.86%	Rusk
1,229	White Oak Springs	115	105	+9.52%	Lafayette
1,230	Butler	112	112	0.00%	Clark
1,231	Big Falls	111	115	−3.48%	Rusk
1,232	Scott	93	106	−12.26%	Monroe
1,233	Parrish	89	91	−2.20%	Langlade
1,234	Finley	83	88	−5.68%	Juneau
1,235	Caswell	77	72	+6.94%	Forest
1,236	Piehl	74	74	0.00%	Oneida
1,237	Kingston	59	57	+3.51%	Juneau
1,238	Anderson	52	54	−3.70%	Iron
1,239	Wilkinson	48	51	−5.88%	Rusk
1,240	Popple River	47	43	+9.30%	Forest
1,241	Cedar Rapids	41	36	+13.89%	Rusk
1,242	Harrison	0	0	NA	Calumet

== See also ==
- List of census-designated places in Wisconsin
- List of cities in Wisconsin
- List of counties in Wisconsin
- List of municipalities in Wisconsin by population
- List of villages in Wisconsin
- Administrative divisions of Wisconsin
