= Eden, Wisconsin (disambiguation) =

Eden is the name of some places in the U.S. state of Wisconsin:

- Eden, Wisconsin, a village
- Eden (town), Fond du Lac County, Wisconsin, a town
- Eden, Iowa County, Wisconsin, a town
