= Cedar Rapids (disambiguation) =

Cedar Rapids is a city in Iowa.

Cedar Rapids may also refer to:

- Cedar Rapids, Nebraska
- Cedar Rapids, Wisconsin
- Cedar Rapids metropolitan area, Iowa, the metropolitan area of Cedar Rapids, Iowa
- Cedar Rapids (film), a 2011 comedy film
