= Sherman, Wisconsin =

Sherman is the name of some places in the U.S. state of Wisconsin:

- Sherman, Clark County, Wisconsin, a town
- Sherman, Dunn County, Wisconsin, a town
- Sherman, Iron County, Wisconsin, a town
- Sherman, Sheboygan County, Wisconsin, a town
