= Bashaw, Burnett County, Wisconsin =

Bashaw, Wisconsin
- Unincorporated community
- Location within Wisconsin Location within the United States
- Coordinates: 45°46′09″N 92°03′48″W
- Country: United States
- State: Wisconsin
- County: Burnett
- Town: Dewey
- Elevation: 1,060 ft (320 m)
- Time zone: UTC-6 (Central (CST))
  - Summer (DST): UTC-5 (CDT)
- Area codes: 715 & 534
- GNIS feature ID: 1843095

Bashaw is an unincorporated community in the town of Dewey, Burnett County, Wisconsin, United States. Bashaw is located on County Highway B, 7 miles (11 km) west-northwest of Shell Lake.
