= Radisson (town), Wisconsin =

Radisson, Wisconsin
- Town
- Town of Radisson
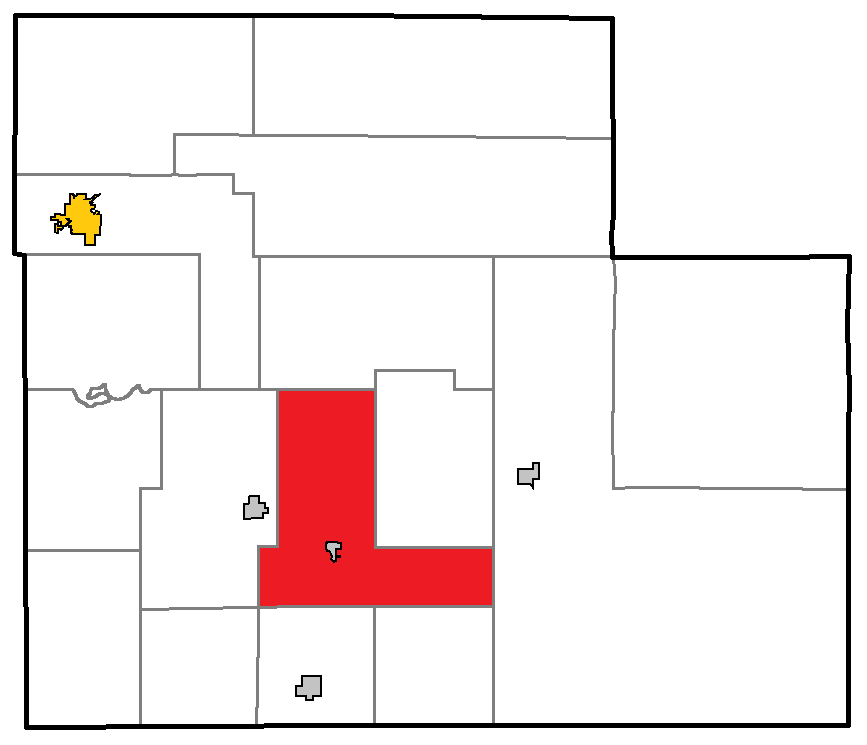
- Location of Radisson, within Sawyer County
- Coordinates: 45°49′21″N 91°12′09″W
- Country: United States
- State: Wisconsin
- County: Sawyer

Area
  - Total: 75.08 sq mi (194.5 km^{2})
  - Land: 74.08 sq mi (191.9 km^{2})
  - Water: 1.01 sq mi (2.6 km^{2})

Population (2020)
  - Total: 445
  - Density: 6.01/sq mi (2.32/km^{2})
- Time zone: UTC-6 (Central (CST))
  - Summer (DST): UTC-5 (CDT)
- Area code(s): 715 & 534
- GNIS feature ID: 1583993

Radisson is a town in Sawyer County, Wisconsin, United States. The population was 445 at the 2020 census. The Village of Radisson is located within the town.

== Geography ==
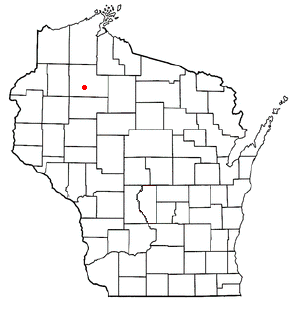
Location of Radisson (town), Wisconsin

According to the United States Census Bureau, the town has a total area of 75.2 square miles (194.7 km^{2}), of which 74.1 square miles (191.9 km^{2}) is land and 1.1 square miles (2.7 km^{2}) (1.41%) is water.

== Demographics ==
As of the census of 2000, there were 465 people, 185 households, and 132 families residing in the town. The population density was 6.3 people per square mile (2.4/km^{2}). There were 351 housing units at an average density of 4.7 per square mile (1.8/km^{2}). The racial makeup of the town was 89.25% White, 6.24% Native American, 0.22% from other races, and 4.30% from two or more races. 0.86% of the population were Hispanic or Latino of any race.

There were 185 households, out of which 28.6% had children under the age of 18 living with them, 61.6% were married couples living together, 5.4% had a female householder with no husband present, and 28.6% were non-families. 23.8% of all households were made up of individuals, and 15.1% had someone living alone who was 65 years of age or older. The average household size was 2.47 and the average family size was 2.93.

In the town, the population was spread out, with 23.2% under the age of 18, 4.9% from 18 to 24, 21.1% from 25 to 44, 29.0% from 45 to 64, and 21.7% who were 65 years of age or older. The median age was 46 years. For every 100 females, there were 103.1 males. For every 100 females age 18 and over, there were 98.3 males.

The median income for a household in the town was $33,523, and the median income for a family was $37,708. Males had a median income of $27,857 versus $17,000 for females. The per capita income for the town was $19,511. About 5.2% of families and 7.9% of the population were below the poverty line, including 4.8% of those under age 18 and 7.5% of those age 65 or over.
