= Hammond (town), Wisconsin =

Town in St. Croix County, Wisconsin

Hammond, Wisconsin
- Town
- Town of Hammond
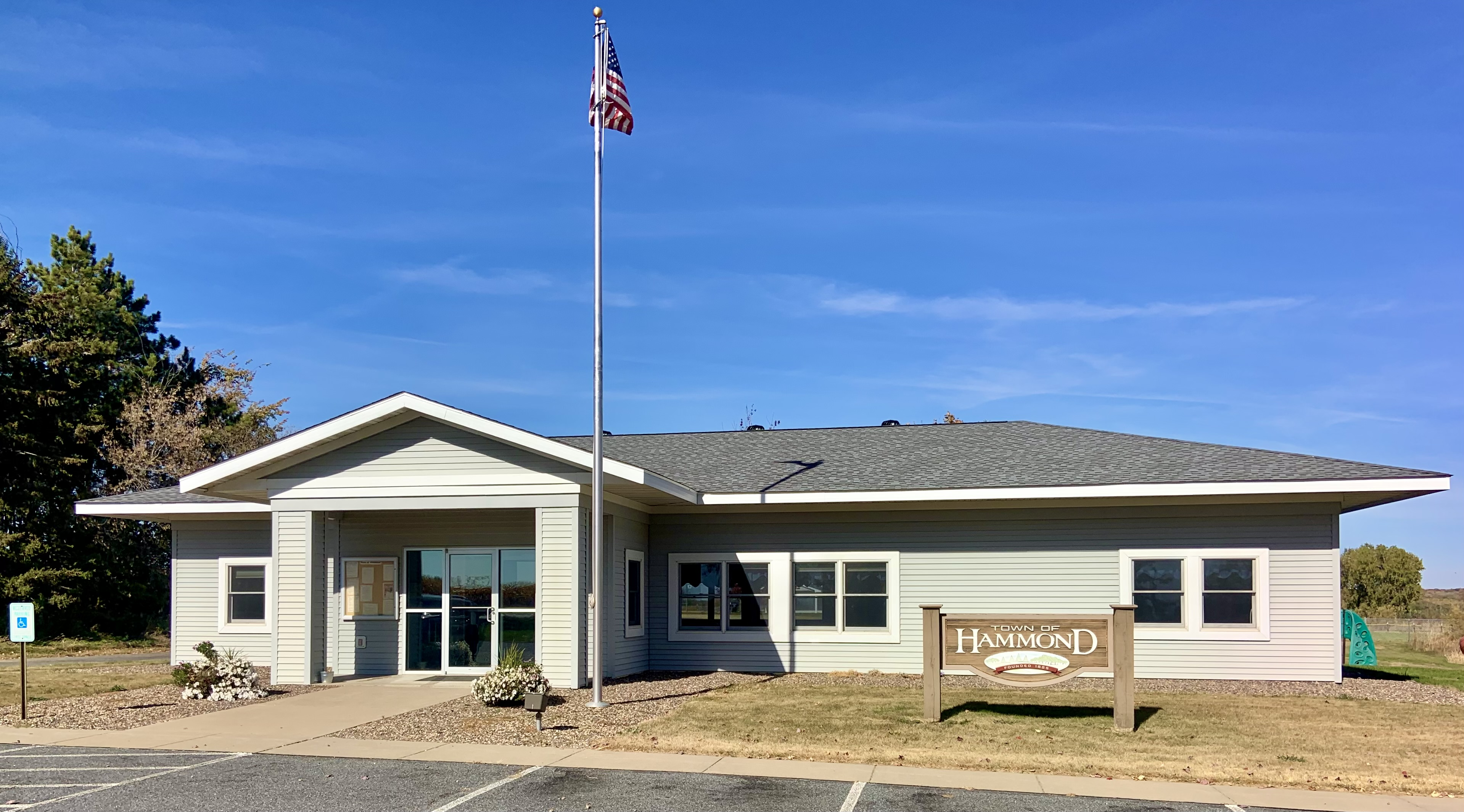
- Hammond Town Hall

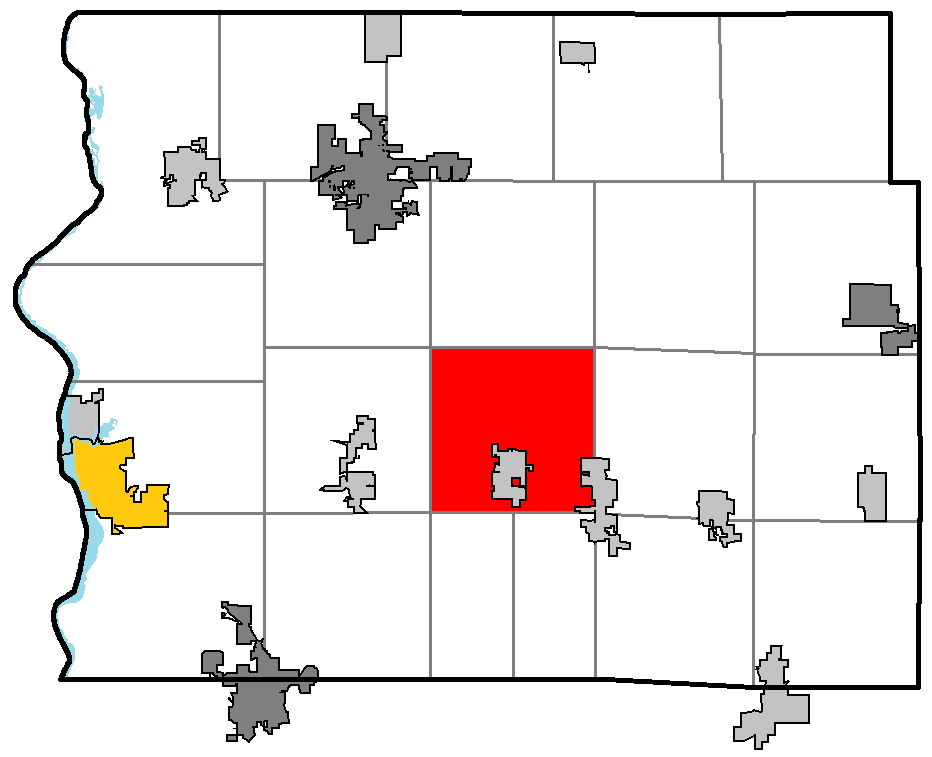
- Location of Hammond, within St. Croix County

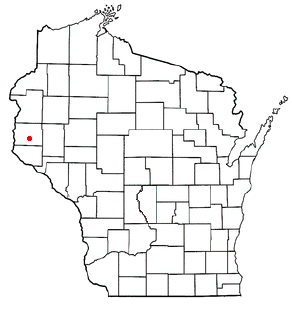
- Location of Hammond, Wisconsin
- Coordinates: 44°58′44″N 92°26′09″W
- Country: United States
- State: Wisconsin
- County: St. Croix

Area
  - Total: 32.66 sq mi (84.6 km^{2})
  - Land: 32.53 sq mi (84.3 km^{2})
  - Water: 0.13 sq mi (0.34 km^{2})

Population (2020)
  - Total: 2,565
  - Density: 78.85/sq mi (30.44/km^{2})
- Time zone: UTC-6 (Central (CST))
  - Summer (DST): UTC-5 (CDT)
- Area code(s): 715 and 534
- GNIS feature ID: 1583343

Hammond is a town in St. Croix County, Wisconsin, United States. The population was 2,565 at the 2020 census. The Village of Hammond is within the town.

== Geography ==
According to the United States Census Bureau, the town has an area of 33.7 square miles (87.2 km^{2}), of which 33.5 square miles (86.8 km^{2}) is land and 0.2 square miles (0.4 km^{2}) (0.45%) is water.

== Demographics ==
Historical population
Census	Pop.	Note	%±
2010	2,102		—
2020	2,565		22.0%

As of the census of 2000, there were 947 people, 314 households, and 266 families residing in the town. The population density was 28.3 inhabitants per square mile (10.9/km^{2}). There were 318 housing units at an average density of 9.5 per square mile (3.7/km^{2}). The racial makeup of the town was 98.73% White, 0.11% Asian, 0.74% from other races, and 0.42% from two or more races. 0.63% of the population were Hispanic or Latino of any race.

There were 314 households, out of which 40.4% had children under the age of 18 living with them, 77.7% were married couples living together, 3.5% had a female householder with no husband present, and 15.0% were non-families. 11.1% of all households were made up of individuals, and 3.8% had someone living alone who was 65 years of age or older. The average household size was 3.02 and the average family size was 3.28.

In the town, the population was spread out, with 30.5% under the age of 18, 6.8% from 18 to 24, 26.6% from 25 to 44, 25.7% from 45 to 64, and 10.5% who were 65 years of age or older. The median age was 37 years. For every 100 females, there were 106.8 males. For every 100 females age 18 and over, there were 110.2 males.

The median income for a household in the town was $53,438, and the median income for a family was $60,694. Males had a median income of $38,000 versus $30,417 for females. The per capita income for the town was $21,357. About 2.2% of families and 4.0% of the population were below the poverty line, including 1.8% of those under age 18 and 7.7% of those age 65 or over.
