= New Lyme, Wisconsin =

- Town
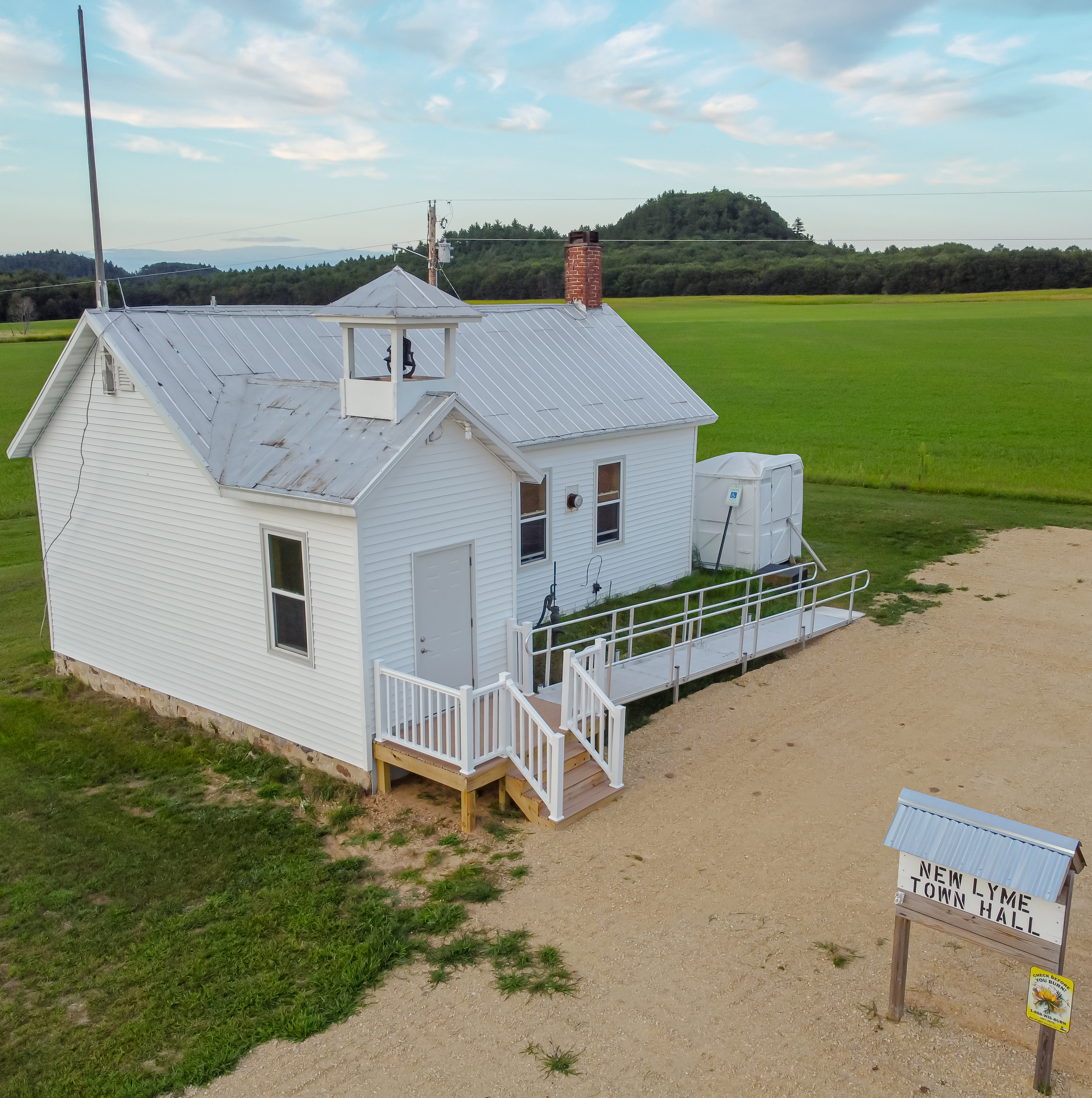
- Town hall

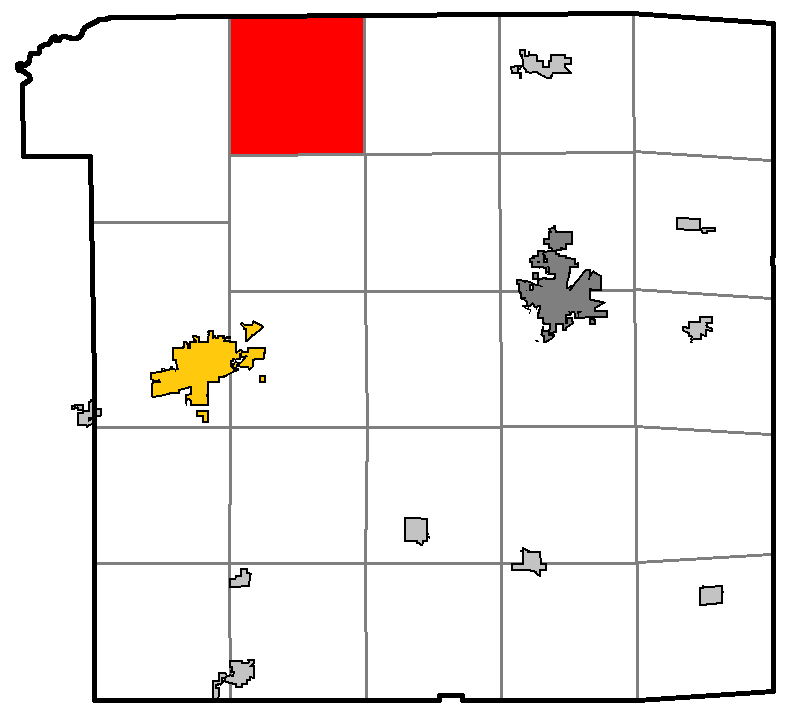
- Location of New Lyme, Monroe County

- Location of Monroe County, Wisconsin
- Coordinates: 44°8′35″N 90°42′23″W
- Country: United States
- State: Wisconsin
- County: Monroe

Area
  - Total: 36.1 sq mi (93.4 km^{2})
  - Land: 35.6 sq mi (92.1 km^{2})
  - Water: 0.50 sq mi (1.3 km^{2})
- Elevation: 1,119 ft (341 m)

Population (2020)
  - Total: 193
  - Density: 5.43/sq mi (2.10/km^{2})
- Time zone: UTC-6 (Central (CST))
  - Summer (DST): UTC-5 (CDT)
- Area code: 608
- FIPS code: 55-56950
- GNIS feature ID: 1583814

New Lyme is a town in Monroe County, Wisconsin, United States. The population was 193 at the 2020 census.

== Geography ==
According to the United States Census Bureau, the town has a total area of 36.1 square miles (93.4 km^{2}), of which 35.6 square miles (92.1 km^{2}) is land and 0.5 square mile (1.3 km^{2}) (1.36%) is water.

== Demographics ==
As of the census of 2000, there were 141 people, 57 households, and 42 families residing in the town. The population density was 4.0 people per square mile (1.5/km^{2}). There were 80 housing units at an average density of 2.2 per square mile (0.9/km^{2}). The racial makeup of the town was 100.00% White.

There were 57 households, out of which 24.6% had children under the age of 18 living with them, 68.4% were married couples living together, 1.8% had a female householder with no husband present, and 26.3% were non-families. 17.5% of all households were made up of individuals, and 3.5% had someone living alone who was 65 years of age or older. The average household size was 2.47 and the average family size was 2.74.

In the town, the population was spread out, with 21.3% under the age of 18, 5.7% from 18 to 24, 32.6% from 25 to 44, 24.1% from 45 to 64, and 16.3% who were 65 years of age or older. The median age was 40 years. For every 100 females, there were 120.3 males. For every 100 females age 18 and over, there were 113.5 males.

The median income for a household in the town was $39,167, and the median income for a family was $39,792. Males had a median income of $20,000 versus $20,208 for females. The per capita income for the town was $20,306. There were 9.4% of families and 13.5% of the population living below the poverty line, including 25.9% of under eighteens and none of those over 64.
