= Eden, Iowa County, Wisconsin =

Eden, Wisconsin
- Town
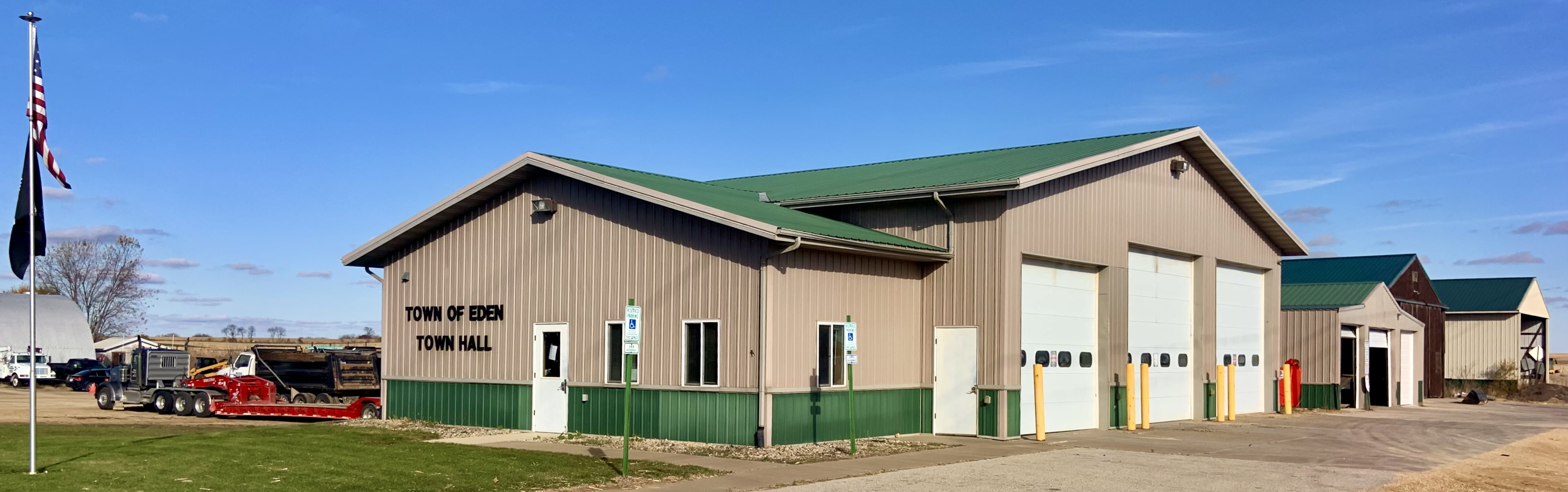
- Town hall

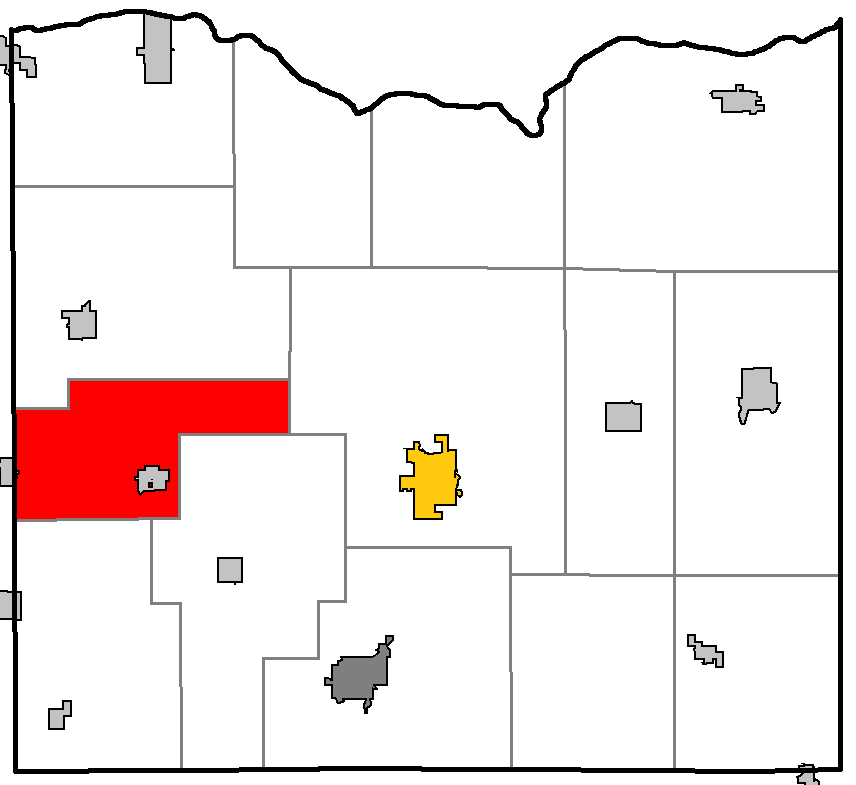
- Location of Eden, within Iowa County, Wisconsin

- Location of Iowa County, Wisconsin
- Coordinates: 42°58′35″N 90°20′5″W
- Country: United States
- State: Wisconsin
- County: Iowa

Area
  - Total: 35.3 sq mi (91.4 km^{2})
  - Land: 35.2 sq mi (91.1 km^{2})
  - Water: 0.12 sq mi (0.3 km^{2})
- Elevation: 1,201 ft (366 m)

Population (2020)
  - Total: 339
  - Density: 9.64/sq mi (3.72/km^{2})
- Time zone: UTC-6 (Central (CST))
  - Summer (DST): UTC-5 (CDT)
- Area code: 608
- FIPS code: 55-22525
- GNIS feature ID: 1583131
- Website: https://www.townofeden-iowacounty.com/

Eden is a town in Iowa County, Wisconsin, United States. The population was 339 at the 2020 census. It surrounds all of the village of Cobb.

== Geography ==
According to the United States Census Bureau, the town has a total area of 35.3 square miles (91.5 km^{2}), of which 35.2 square miles (91.1 km^{2}) is land and 0.1 square mile (0.3 km^{2}) (0.34%) is water.

== Demographics ==
As of the census of 2000, there were 397 people, 135 households, and 112 families residing in the town. The population density was 11.3 people per square mile (4.4/km^{2}). There were 147 housing units at an average density of 4.2 per square mile (1.6/km^{2}). The racial makeup of the town was 98.24% White, 0.50% Asian, and 1.26% from other races.

There were 135 households, out of which 45.2% had children under the age of 18 living with them, 74.8% were married couples living together, 3.0% had a female householder with no husband present, and 17.0% were non-families. 13.3% of all households were made up of individuals, and 5.2% had someone living alone who was 65 years of age or older. The average household size was 2.94 and the average family size was 3.23.

In the town, the population was spread out, with 33.2% under the age of 18, 4.8% from 18 to 24, 29.7% from 25 to 44, 22.9% from 45 to 64, and 9.3% who were 65 years of age or older. The median age was 35 years. For every 100 females, there were 114.6 males. For every 100 females age 18 and over, there were 113.7 males.

The median income for a household in the town was $42,813, and the median income for a family was $48,250. Males had a median income of $24,861 versus $21,964 for females. The per capita income for the town was $18,084. About 7.5% of families and 8.8% of the population were below the poverty line, including 10.1% of those under age 18 and 5.1% of those age 65 or over.
