= Sherman, Dunn County, Wisconsin =

Sherman, Wisconsin
- Town
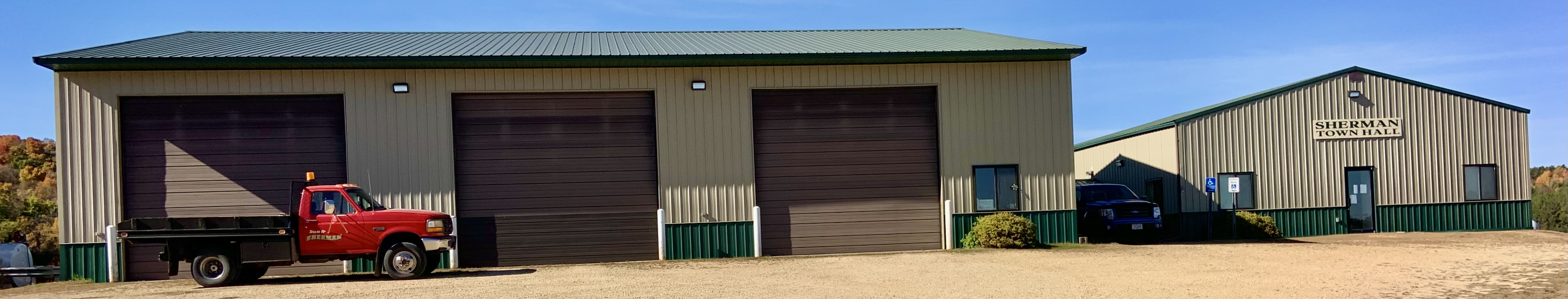
- Town hall

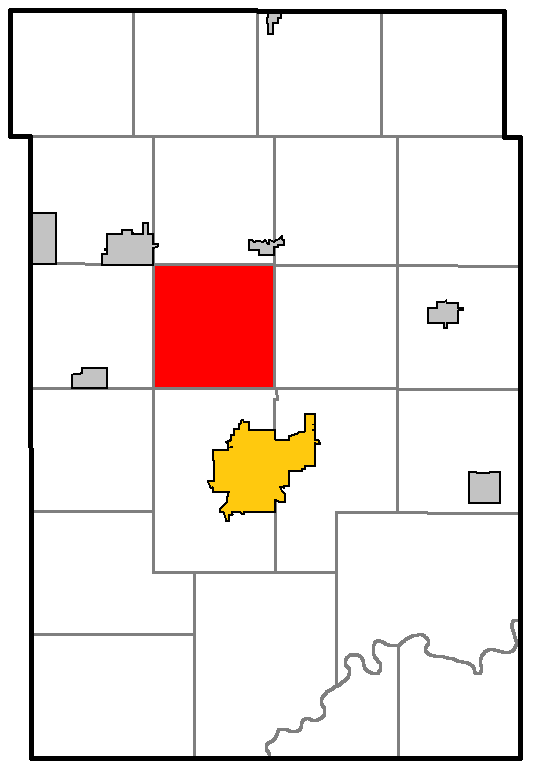
- Location of Sherman, within Dunn County

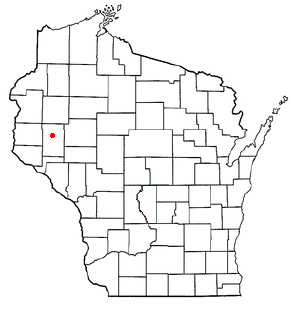
- Location of Sherman, Wisconsin
- Coordinates: 44°59′8″N 91°57′14″W
- Country: United States
- State: Wisconsin
- County: Dunn

Area
  - Total: 35.4 sq mi (91.6 km^{2})
  - Land: 35.3 sq mi (91.4 km^{2})
  - Water: 0.077 sq mi (0.2 km^{2})
- Elevation: 997 ft (304 m)

Population (2020)
  - Total: 922
  - Density: 26.1/sq mi (10.1/km^{2})
- Time zone: UTC-6 (Central (CST))
  - Summer (DST): UTC-5 (CDT)
- Area codes: 715 & 534
- FIPS code: 55-73375
- GNIS feature ID: 1584146
- Website: https://www.townofshermandunn.com/

Sherman is a town in Dunn County, Wisconsin, United States. The population was 922 at the 2020 census.

== Geography ==
According to the United States Census Bureau, the town has a total area of 35.4 square miles (91.6 km^{2}), of which 35.3 square miles (91.4 km^{2}) is land and 0.1 square mile (0.3 km^{2}) (0.28%) is water.

== Demographics ==
Historical population
Census	Pop.	Note	%±
1990	725		—
2000	748		3.2%
2010	849		13.5%
2020	922		8.6%

As of the census of 2000, there were 748 people, 272 households, and 218 families residing in the town. The population density was 21.2 people per square mile (8.2/km^{2}). There were 292 housing units at an average density of 8.3 per square mile (3.2/km^{2}). The racial makeup of the town was 99.06% White, 0.27% African American, 0.27% Native American, 0.13% Asian, 0.13% from other races, and 0.13% from two or more races. Hispanic or Latino of any race were 0.13% of the population.

There were 272 households, out of which 34.9% had children under the age of 18 living with them, 71.7% were married couples living together, 6.3% had a female householder with no husband present, and 19.5% were non-families. 15.4% of all households were made up of individuals, and 6.6% had someone living alone who was 65 years of age or older. The average household size was 2.75 and the average family size was 3.06.

In the town, the population was spread out, with 26.5% under the age of 18, 8.0% from 18 to 24, 25.1% from 25 to 44, 27.9% from 45 to 64, and 12.4% who were 65 years of age or older. The median age was 39 years. For every 100 females, there were 101.6 males. For every 100 females age 18 and over, there were 104.5 males.

The median income for a household in the town was $45,795, and the median income for a family was $49,688. Males had a median income of $31,250 versus $25,156 for females. The per capita income for the town was $19,467. About 6.9% of families and 8.4% of the population were below the poverty line, including 6.8% of those under age 18 and 12.9% of those age 65 or over.

== See also ==
- List of towns in Wisconsin
