= Seneca, Wood County, Wisconsin =

Town of Seneca, Wisconsin
- Town
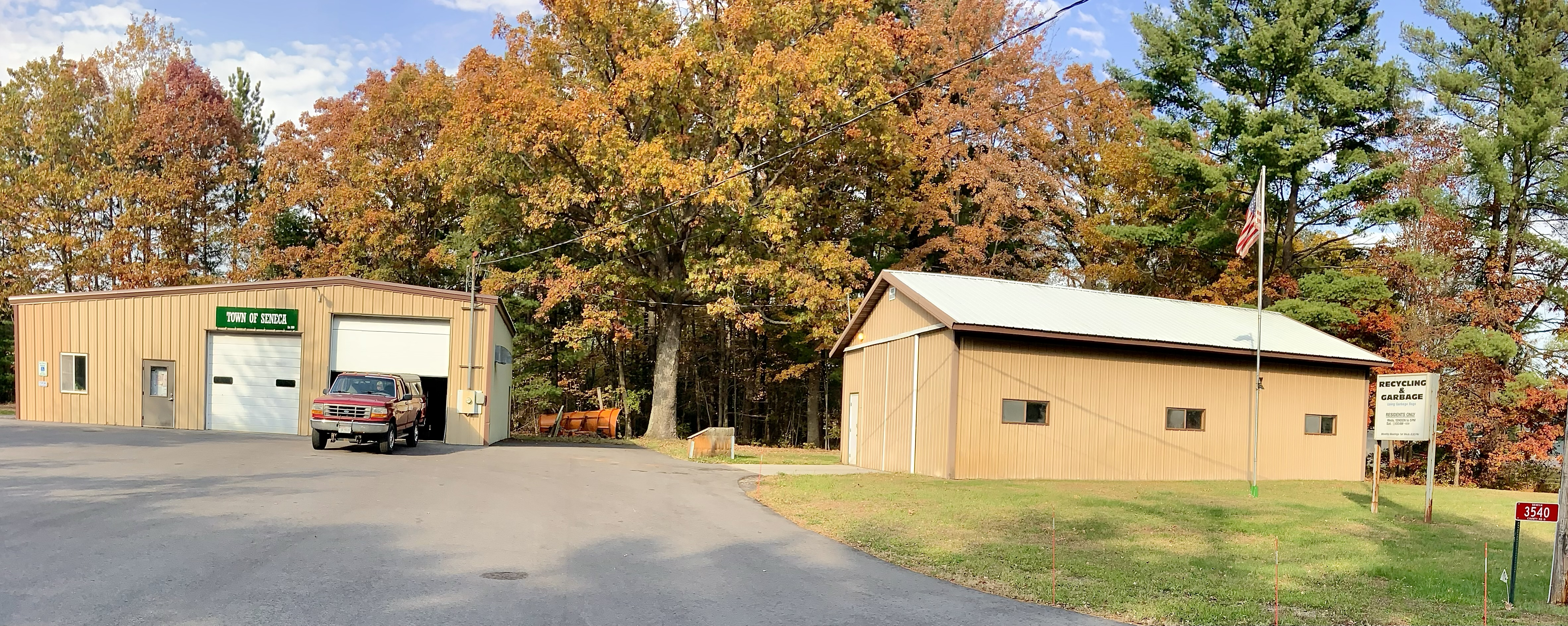
- Town hall

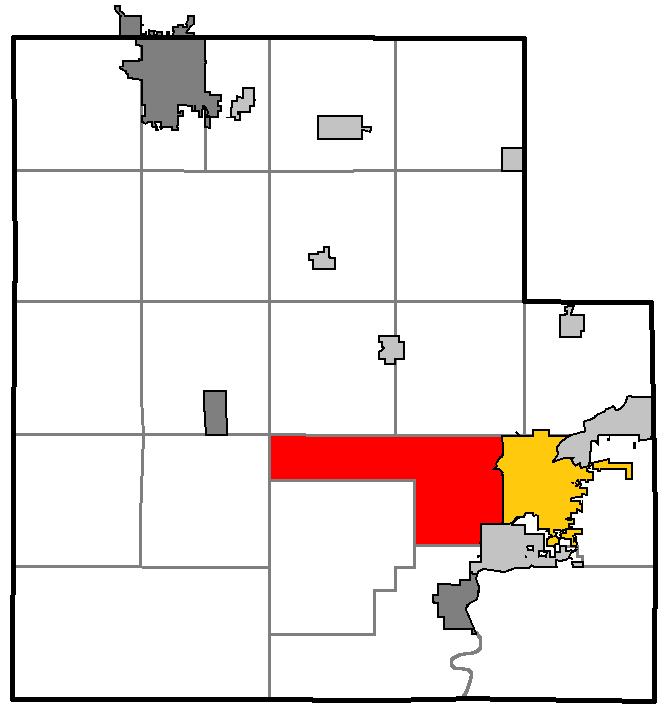
- Location of the Town of Seneca, Wood County, Wisconsin

- Location of Wood County, Wisconsin
- Coordinates: 44°24′0″N 89°57′23″W
- Country: United States
- State: Wisconsin
- County: Wood

Area
  - Total: 32.4 sq mi (84.0 km^{2})
  - Land: 32.2 sq mi (83.5 km^{2})
  - Water: 0.19 sq mi (0.5 km^{2})
- Elevation: 1,004 ft (306 m)

Population (2020)
  - Total: 1,039
  - Density: 32.2/sq mi (12.4/km^{2})
- Time zone: UTC-6 (Central (CST))
  - Summer (DST): UTC-5 (CDT)
- Area codes: 715 & 534
- FIPS code: 55-72575
- GNIS feature ID: 1584124
- PLSS township: most of T22N R5E and part of T22N R4E

The Town of Seneca is located in Wood County, Wisconsin, United States. The population was 1,039 at the 2020 census.

== Geography ==
According to the United States Census Bureau, the town has a total area of 32.4 square miles (84.0 km^{2}), of which 32.2 square miles (83.5 km^{2}) is land and 0.2 square mile (0.5 km^{2}) (0.59%) is water.

== History ==
The east end of the town, within three miles of the Wisconsin River, was in the "Indian strip" ceded by the Menominee to the U.S. government in the 1836 Treaty of the Cedars. As such, it was logged and surveyed earlier than land further from the river. In 1839 a crew working for the U.S. government surveyed what would become the east and south edges of the town, walking through the woods and crossing the river, measuring with chain and compass. In 1851 a different crew surveyed the section lines of the town, producing this general description:

The East & South East portion of this Town consists of alternate ridges of pine barrens and Tamarack Swamps. There is a small portion of land near the river that is tolerably fair but the bottoms on the river are worthless(?) owing to their being overflowed nearly every year. The West & north parts of the Town consist of a portion of the great Cranberry Marsh which extends to & beyond Yellow river. The Marsh is wet & unfit for cultivation & has upon it small Islands (so called) of hard land with a few trees; Scattering Pines, Tamarack & Blk Oak are found nearly all over it so much so that we almost invariably found bearing trees for our corners. The Marsh may be valuable for the Cranberries which it produces abundantly but otherwise is entirely(?) worthless(?).

(For a similar early surveyor's description of the 6-mile square that contains western Seneca, see Cranmoor.)

The Town of Seneca took its name from the now-extinct hamlet of Seneca, which was located within its borders.

== Demographics ==
As of the census of 2000, there were 1,202 people, 408 households, and 330 families residing in the town. The population density was 37.3 people per square mile (14.4/km^{2}). There were 422 housing units at an average density of 13.1 per square mile (5.1/km^{2}). The racial makeup of the town was 90.68% White, 5.99% Native American, 2.33% Asian, and 1.00% from two or more races. Hispanic or Latino of any race were 0.92% of the population.

There were 408 households, out of which 38.0% had children under the age of 18 living with them, 71.1% were married couples living together, 6.4% had a female householder with no husband present, and 18.9% were non-families. 14.5% of all households were made up of individuals, and 6.1% had someone living alone who was 65 years of age or older. The average household size was 2.94 and the average family size was 3.27.

In the town, the population was spread out, with 28.8% under the age of 18, 7.0% from 18 to 24, 29.5% from 25 to 44, 23.5% from 45 to 64, and 11.1% who were 65 years of age or older. The median age was 37 years. For every 100 females, there were 104.1 males. For every 100 females age 18 and over, there were 101.9 males.

The median income for a household in the town was $54,118, and the median income for a family was $58,750. Males had a median income of $39,375 versus $26,974 for females. The per capita income for the town was $21,833. About 3.0% of families and 6.0% of the population were below the poverty line, including 5.4% of those under age 18 and 15.4% of those age 65 or over.
