= Newton, Marquette County, Wisconsin =

Newton, Wisconsin
- Town
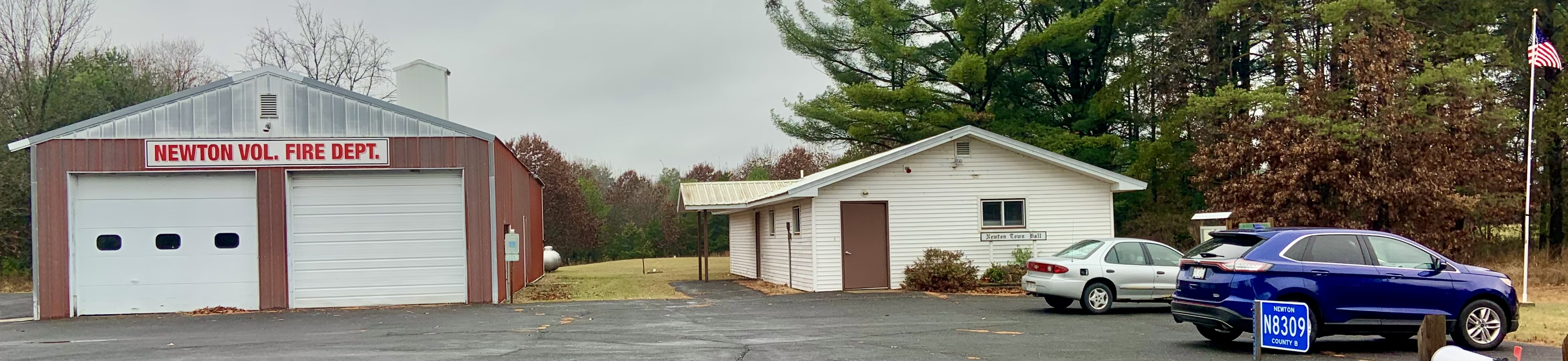
- Town hall

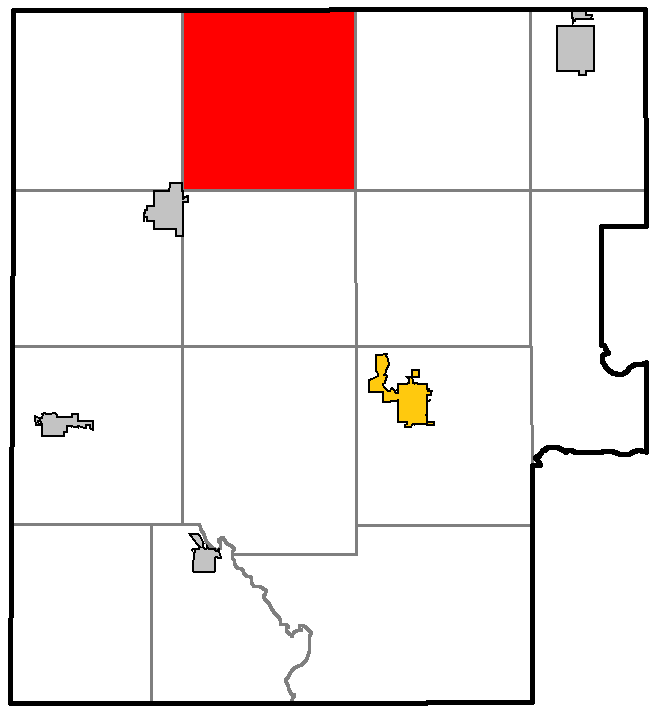
- Location of Newton, Marquette County, Wisconsin

- Location of Marquette County, Wisconsin
- Coordinates: 43°56′49″N 89°25′13″W
- Country: United States
- State: Wisconsin
- County: Marquette

Area
  - Total: 35.6 sq mi (92.3 km^{2})
  - Land: 35.5 sq mi (91.9 km^{2})
  - Water: 0.12 sq mi (0.3 km^{2})
- Elevation: 850 ft (259 m)

Population (2020)
  - Total: 529
  - Density: 14.9/sq mi (5.76/km^{2})
- Time zone: UTC-6 (Central (CST))
  - Summer (DST): UTC-5 (CDT)
- FIPS code: 55-57225
- GNIS feature ID: 1583818

Newton is a town in Marquette County, Wisconsin, United States. The population was 529 during the 2020 census.

== Geography ==
According to the United States Census Bureau, the town has a total area of 35.6 square miles (92.3 km^{2}), of which 35.5 square miles (91.9 km^{2}) is land and 0.1 square miles (0.3 km^{2}) (0.36%) is water.

== Demographics ==
As of the census of 2000, there were 550 people, 215 households, and 155 families residing in the town. The population density was 15.5 people per square mile (6.0/km^{2}). There were 342 housing units at an average density of 9.6 per square mile (3.7/km^{2}). The racial makeup of the town was 98.36% White, 1.09% African American, and 0.55% from two or more races. Hispanic or Latino people of any race were 0.55% of the population.

There were 215 households, out of which 24.2% had children under the age of 18 living with them, 62.8% were married couples living together, 6.5% had a female householder with no husband present, and 27.9% were non-families. 24.2% of all households were made up of individuals, and 9.3% had someone living alone who was 65 years of age or older. The average household size was 2.56 and the average family size was 3.03.

In the town, the population was spread out, with 22.4% under the age of 18, 7.8% from 18 to 24, 25.6% from 25 to 44, 28.2% from 45 to 64, and 16.0% who were 65 years of age or older. The median age was 41 years. For every 100 females, there were 101.5 males. For every 100 females age 18 and over, there were 102.4 males.

The median income for a household in the town was $33,036, and the median income for a family was $37,083. Males had a median income of $26,528 versus $20,515 for females. The per capita income for the town was $18,039. About 7.3% of families and 14.3% of the population were below the poverty line, including 24.0% of those under age 18 and 11.0% of those age 65 or over.

== Education ==
It is part of the Westfield School District.
