= Somers (town), Wisconsin =

Somers, Wisconsin
- Town
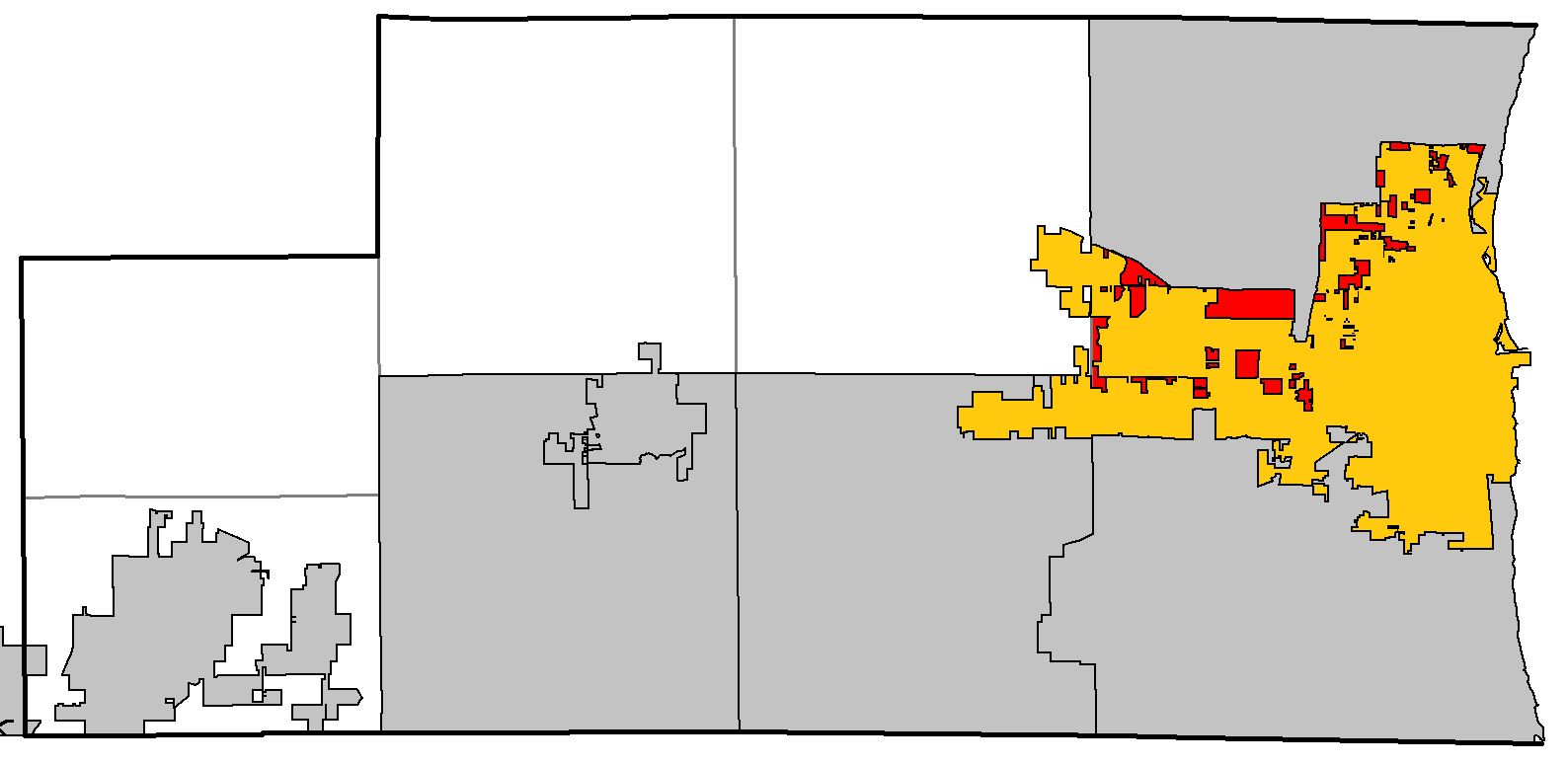
- Location of Somers, within Kenosha County
- Coordinates: 42°36′07″N 87°53′42″W
- Country: United States
- State: Wisconsin
- County: Kenosha

Area
  - Total: 2.443 sq mi (6.33 km^{2})
  - Land: 2.443 sq mi (6.33 km^{2})
  - Water: 0 sq mi (0 km^{2})
- Elevation: 669 ft (204 m)

Population (2020)
  - Total: 992
  - Density: 406/sq mi (157/km^{2})
- Time zone: UTC-6 (Central (CST))
  - Summer (DST): UTC-5 (CDT)
- Area code: 262
- FIPS code: 55-059-74650
- GNIS feature ID: 1584173
- Website: https://www.somerswi.gov/

Somers is a town in Kenosha County, Wisconsin, United States. Prior to 2015, the town encompassed all of the village of Somers along with its current area. When the village was incorporated in 2015, the western part of the original town remained as part of the town; however, it was later incorporated into the village as well. The present town largely consists of land along or within the boundaries of Kenosha and is slated to become part of Kenosha by 2035.

== Demographics ==
=== 2020 census ===
Somers town, Kenosha County, Wisconsin – Racial and ethnic composition Note: the US Census treats Hispanic/Latino as an ethnic category. This table excludes Latinos from the racial categories and assigns them to a separate category. Hispanics/Latinos may be of any race.
| Race / Ethnicity (NH = Non-Hispanic) | Pop 2000 | Pop 2010 | Pop 2020 | % 2000 | % 2010 | % 2020 |
|---|---|---|---|---|---|---|
| White alone (NH) | 8,141 | 8,135 | 805 | 89.87% | 84.77% | 81.15% |
| Black or African American alone (NH) | 283 | 458 | 5 | 3.12% | 4.77% | 0.50% |
| Native American or Alaska Native alone (NH) | 24 | 18 | 2 | 0.26% | 0.19% | 0.20% |
| Asian alone (NH) | 112 | 188 | 4 | 1.24% | 1.96% | 0.40% |
| Native Hawaiian or Pacific Islander alone (NH) | 3 | 2 | 1 | 0.03% | 0.02% | 0.10% |
| Other race alone (NH) | 12 | 19 | 2 | 0.13% | 0.20% | 0.20% |
| Mixed race or Multiracial (NH) | 113 | 163 | 46 | 1.25% | 1.70% | 4.64% |
| Hispanic or Latino (any race) | 371 | 614 | 127 | 4.10% | 6.40% | 12.80% |
| Total | 9,059 | 9,597 | 992 | 100.00% | 100.00% | 100.00% |

As of the 2020 census, the town of Somers had a population of 992, compared to a population of 9,597 at the 2010 census, prior to incorporation of the village of Somers.
