= Wescott, Wisconsin =

- Town
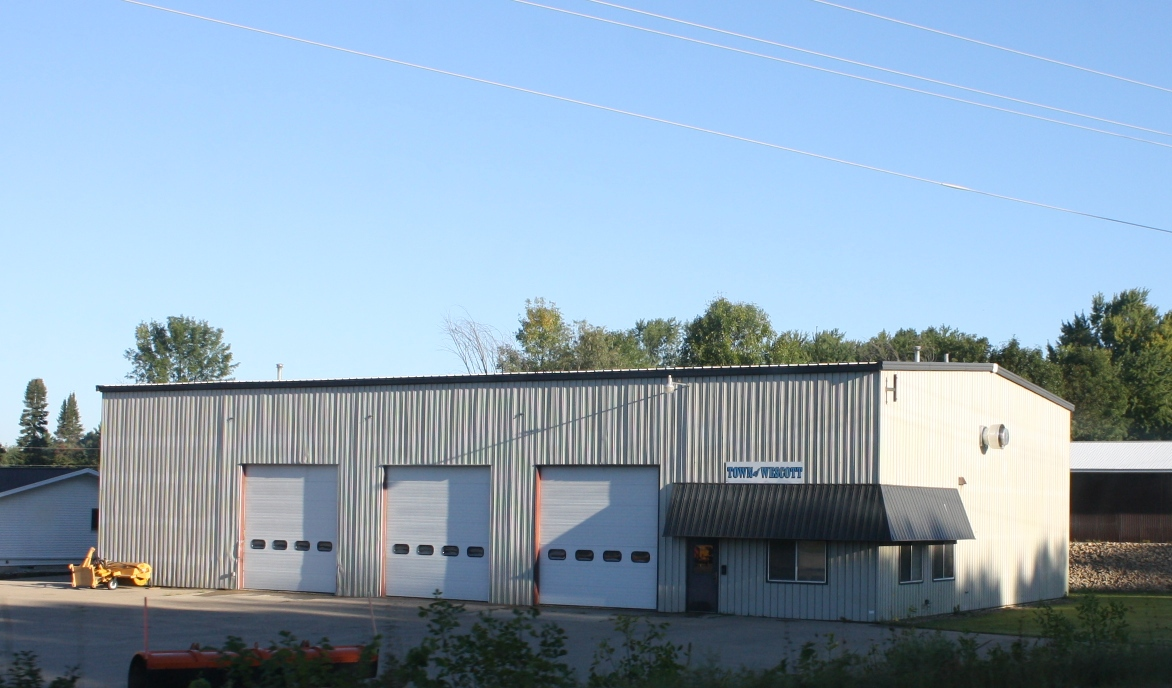
- Town hall

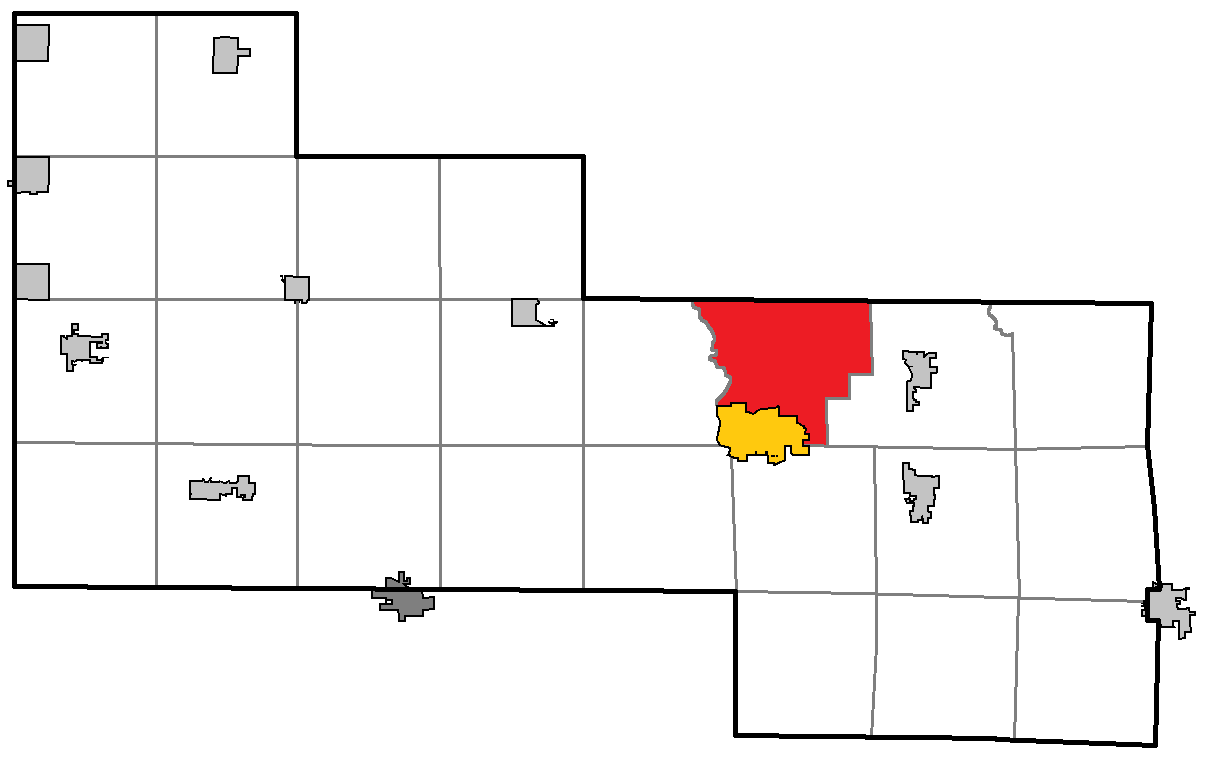
- Location of Wescott, within Shawano County
- Coordinates: 44°48′57″N 88°33′20″W
- Country: United States
- State: Wisconsin
- County: Shawano

Area
  - Total: 30.3 sq mi (78.6 km^{2})
  - Land: 22.7 sq mi (58.7 km^{2})
  - Water: 7.6 sq mi (19.8 km^{2})
- Elevation: 807 ft (246 m)

Population (2020)
  - Total: 3,257
  - Density: 144/sq mi (55.5/km^{2})
- Time zone: UTC-6 (Central (CST))
  - Summer (DST): UTC-5 (CDT)
- FIPS code: 55-85275
- GNIS feature ID: 1584396
- Website: Town of Wescott

Wescott is a town in Shawano County, Wisconsin, United States. The population was 3,257 at the 2020 census.

== Geography ==
According to the United States Census Bureau, the town has a total area of 30.3 square miles (78.6 km^{2}), of which 22.7 square miles (58.7 km^{2}) is land and 7.7 square miles (19.8 km^{2}) (25.26%) is water.

== Demographics ==
At the 2000 census, there were 3,653 people, 1,581 households and 1,094 families residing in the town. The population density was 161.1 per square mile (62.2/km^{2}). There were 2,341 housing units at an average density of 103.3 per square mile (39.9/km^{2}). The racial makeup of the town was 93.95% White, 0.11% African American, 4.33% Native American, 0.16% Asian, 0.08% Pacific Islander, 0.19% from other races, and 1.18% from two or more races. Hispanic or Latino of any race were 0.88% of the population.

There were 1,581 households, of which 24.6% had children under the age of 18 living with them, 59.1% were married couples living together, 6.5% had a female householder with no husband present, and 30.8% were non-families. 24.3% of all households were made up of individuals, and 11.2% had someone living alone who was 65 years of age or older. The average household size was 2.31 and the average family size was 2.73.

20.5% of the population were under the age of 18, 5.7% from 18 to 24, 26.1% from 25 to 44, 28.2% from 45 to 64, and 19.4% who were 65 years of age or older. The median age was 44 years. For every 100 females, there were 101.9 males. For every 100 females age 18 and over, there were 98.6 males.

The median household income was $40,060, and the median family income was $42,148. Males had a median income of $36,189 versus $22,357 for females. The per capita income for the town was $20,760. About 2.8% of families and 3.5% of the population were below the poverty line, including 1.9% of those under age 18 and 5.4% of those age 65 or over.
