= Washington, Shawano County, Wisconsin =

Washington, Wisconsin
- Town
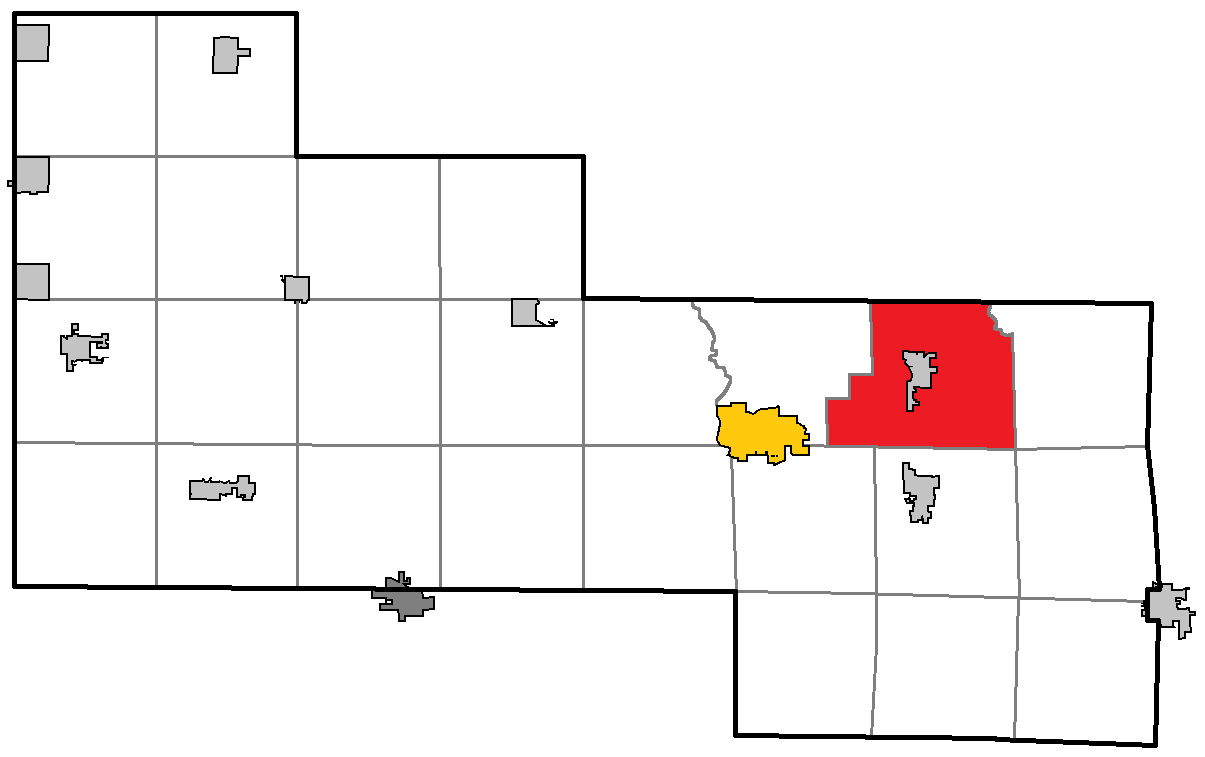
- Location of Washington, within Shawano County, Wisconsin
- Coordinates: 44°48′17″N 88°27′38″W
- Country: United States
- State: Wisconsin
- County: Shawano

Area
  - Total: 39.0 sq mi (101.0 km^{2})
  - Land: 35.4 sq mi (91.6 km^{2})
  - Water: 3.6 sq mi (9.4 km^{2})
- Elevation: 807 ft (246 m)

Population (2020)
  - Total: 1,965
  - Density: 55.6/sq mi (21.5/km^{2})
- Time zone: UTC-6 (Central (CST))
  - Summer (DST): UTC-5 (CDT)
- FIPS code: 55-83725
- GNIS feature ID: 1584358
- Website: https://townofwashingtonshawanoco.com/

Washington is a town in Shawano County, Wisconsin, United States. The population was 1,965 at the 2020 census.

== Geography ==
According to the United States Census Bureau, the town has a total area of 39.0 square miles (101.0 km^{2}), of which 35.4 square miles (91.6 km^{2}) is land and 3.6 square miles (9.4 km^{2}) (9.29%) is water.

== Demographics ==
As of the census of 2000, there were 1,903 people, 803 households, and 586 families residing in the town. The population density was 53.8 people per square mile (20.8/km^{2}). There were 1,217 housing units at an average density of 34.4 per square mile (13.3/km^{2}). The racial makeup of the town was 95.32% White, 0.11% African American, 3.26% Native American, 0.42% from other races, and 0.89% from two or more races. 1.26% of the population were Hispanic or Latino of any race.

There were 803 households, out of which 23.4% had children under the age of 18 living with them, 64.6% were married couples living together, 5.6% had a female householder with no husband present, and 26.9% were non-families. 22.4% of all households were made up of individuals, and 12.0% had someone living alone who was 65 years of age or older. The average household size was 2.37 and the average family size was 2.76.

In the town, the population was spread out, with 20.8% under the age of 18, 5.0% from 18 to 24, 22.9% from 25 to 44, 30.2% from 45 to 64, and 21.2% who were 65 years of age or older. The median age was 46 years. For every 100 females, there were 104.8 males. For every 100 females age 18 and over, there were 103.5 males.

The median income for a household in the town was $36,630, and the median income for a family was $46,447. Males had a median income of $33,173 versus $22,156 for females. The per capita income for the town was $20,665. 6.8% of the population and 4.1% of families were below the poverty line. Out of the total population, 12.4% of those under the age of 18 and 4.1% of those 65 and older were living below the poverty line.
