= Dewey, Burnett County, Wisconsin =

Dewey, Wisconsin
- Town
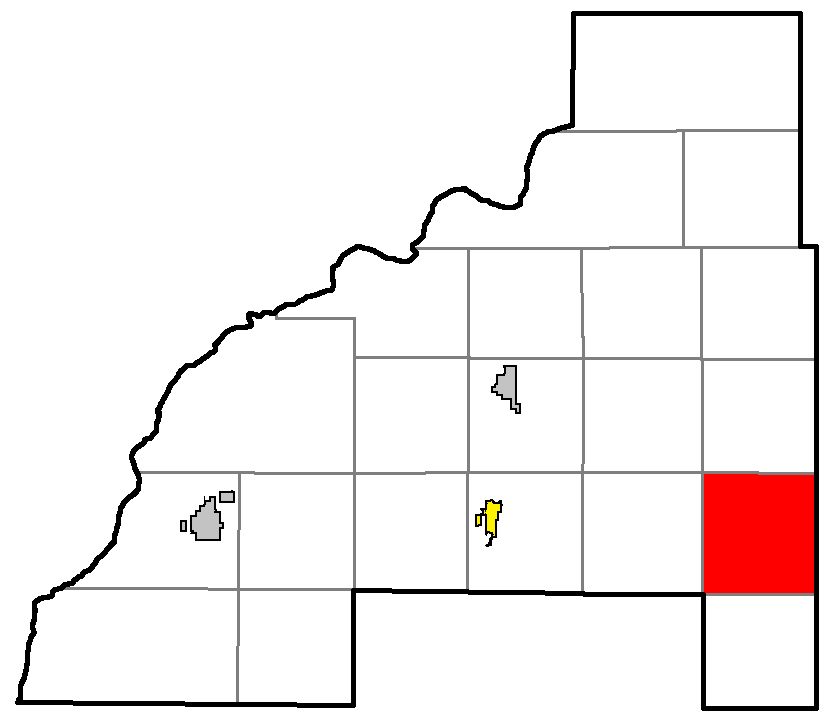
- Location of Dewey, within Burnett County
- Coordinates: 45°46′35″N 92°6′15″W
- Country: United States
- State: Wisconsin
- County: Burnett

Area
  - Total: 36.8 sq mi (95.4 km^{2})
  - Land: 36.3 sq mi (94.0 km^{2})
  - Water: 0.54 sq mi (1.4 km^{2})
- Elevation: 1,089 ft (332 m)

Population (2020)
  - Total: 545
  - Density: 15.0/sq mi (5.80/km^{2})
- Time zone: UTC-6 (Central (CST))
  - Summer (DST): UTC-5 (CDT)
- Area codes: 715 & 534
- FIPS code: 55-19925
- GNIS feature ID: 1583079
- Website: townofdewey.com

Dewey is a town in Burnett County in the U.S. state of Wisconsin. The population was 545 at the 2020 census. The unincorporated community of Bashaw is located in the town.

== Geography ==
Dewey is located in southeastern Burnett County and is bordered by Washburn County to the east. According to the United States Census Bureau, the town has a total area of 36.8 square miles (95.4 km^{2}), of which 36.3 square miles (94.0 km^{2}) is land and 0.54 square miles (1.4 km^{2}), or 1.43%, is water.

== Demographics ==
As of the census of 2000, there were 565 people, 209 households, and 164 families residing in the town. The population density was 15.6 people per square mile (6.0/km^{2}). There were 303 housing units at an average density of 8.3 per square mile (3.2/km^{2}). The racial makeup of the town was 89.38% White, 10.09% Native American, and 0.53% from two or more races. Hispanic or Latino of any race were 1.42% of the population.

There were 209 households, out of which 29.7% had children under the age of 18 living with them, 66.5% were married couples living together, 6.2% had a female householder with no husband present, and 21.5% were non-families. 17.2% of all households were made up of individuals, and 8.6% had someone living alone who was 65 years of age or older. The average household size was 2.70 and the average family size was 3.04.

In the town, the population was spread out, with 27.6% under the age of 18, 7.8% from 18 to 24, 22.7% from 25 to 44, 28.3% from 45 to 64, and 13.6% who were 65 years of age or older. The median age was 40 years. For every 100 females, there were 98.2 males. For every 100 females age 18 and over, there were 101.5 males.

The median income for a household in the town was $28,917, and the median income for a family was $30,625. Males had a median income of $27,917 versus $23,750 for females. The per capita income for the town was $15,399. About 10.5% of families and 13.1% of the population were below the poverty line, including 12.8% of those under age 18 and 25.7% of those age 65 or over.
