= Cedar Rapids, Wisconsin =

- Town
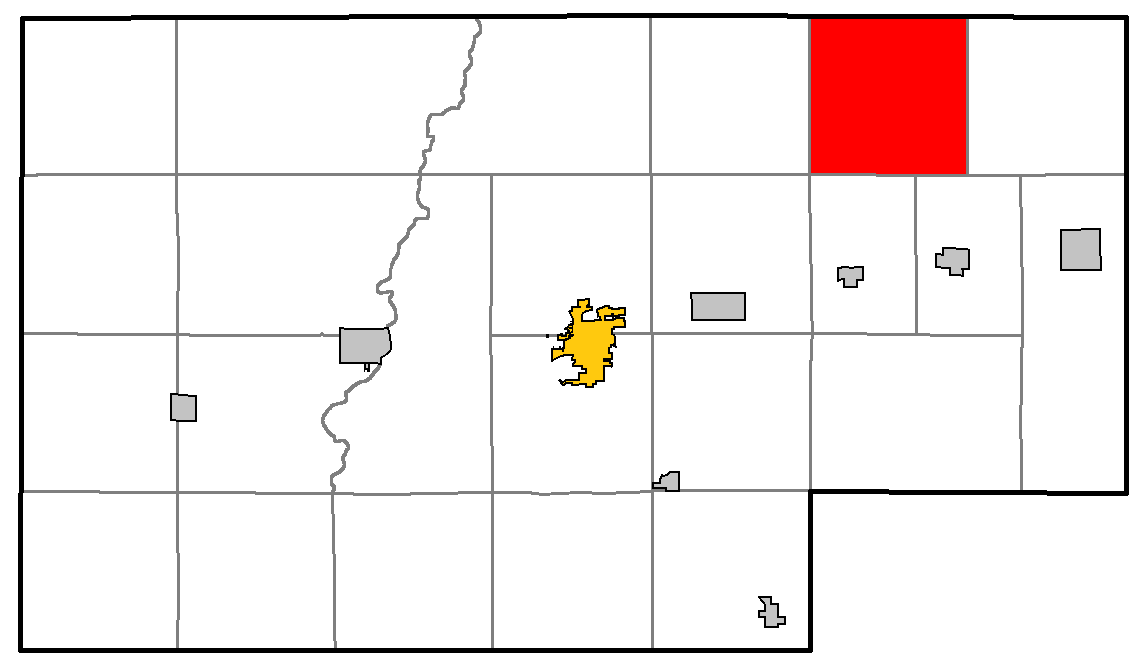
- Location of Cedar Rapids, within Rusk County

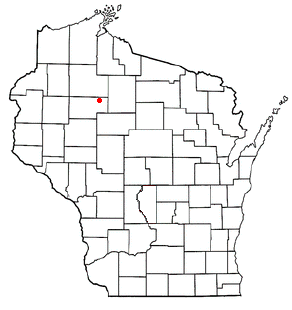
- Location of Cedar Rapids, Wisconsin
- Coordinates: 45°35′39″N 90°50′39″W
- Country: United States
- State: Wisconsin
- County: Rusk

Area
  - Total: 35.7 sq mi (92.4 km^{2})
  - Land: 35.2 sq mi (91.1 km^{2})
  - Water: 0.50 sq mi (1.3 km^{2})
- Elevation: 1,388 ft (423 m)

Population (2020)
  - Total: 36
  - Density: 1.0/sq mi (0.40/km^{2})
- Time zone: UTC-6 (Central (CST))
  - Summer (DST): UTC-5 (CDT)
- Area codes: 715 & 534
- FIPS code: 55-13550
- GNIS feature ID: 1582940

Cedar Rapids is a town in Rusk County, Wisconsin, United States. The population was 36 at the 2020 census.

== Geography ==
According to the United States Census Bureau, the town has a total area of 35.7 square miles (92.4 km^{2}), of which 35.2 square miles (91.1 km^{2}) is land and 0.5 square mile (1.3 km^{2}) (1.40%) is water.

== Demographics ==
As of the census of 2000, there were 37 people, 11 households, and 8 families residing in the town. The population density was 1.1 people per square mile (0.4/km^{2}). There were 16 housing units at an average density of 0.5 per square mile (0.2/km^{2}). The racial makeup of the town was 70.27% White, 29.73% from other races. Hispanic or Latino of any race were 29.73% of the population.

There were 11 households, out of which 45.5% had children under the age of 18 living with them, 54.5% were married couples living together, 18.2% had a female householder with no husband present, and 18.2% were non-families. 9.1% of all households were made up of individuals, and none had someone living alone who was 65 years of age or older. The average household size was 3.36 and the average family size was 3.67.

In the town, the population was spread out, with 35.1% under the age of 18, 10.8% from 18 to 24, 21.6% from 25 to 44, 24.3% from 45 to 64, and 8.1% who were 65 years of age or older. The median age was 37 years. For every 100 females, there were 68.2 males. For every 100 females age 18 and over, there were 84.6 males.

The median income for a household in the town was $44,375, and the median income for a family was $43,750. Males had a median income of $35,625 versus $31,250 for females. The per capita income for the town was $17,188. There were 14.3% of families and 8.3% of the population living below the poverty line, including 16.7% of under eighteens and none of those over 64.
