= Weston, Clark County, Wisconsin =

Weston, Wisconsin
- Town
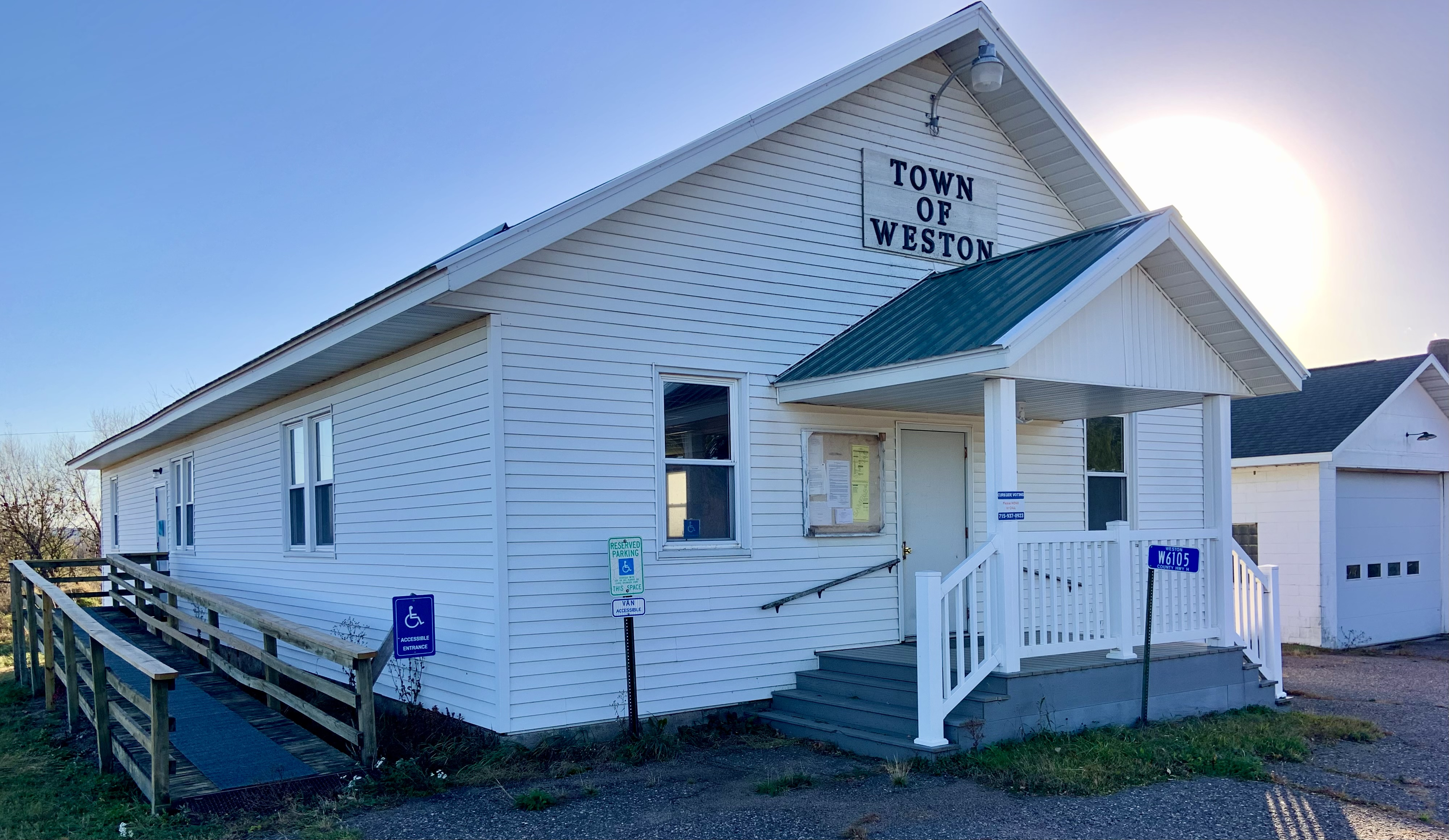
- Town hall

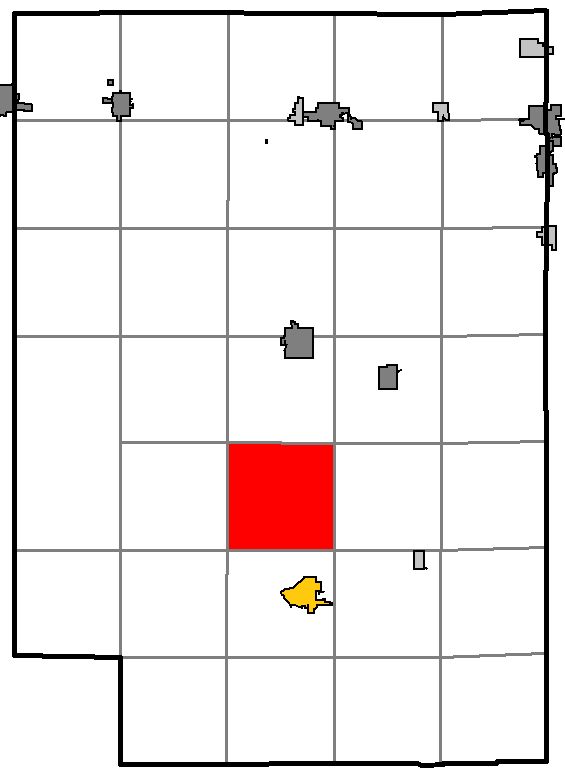
- Location of Weston, Clark County

- Location of Clark County, Wisconsin
- Coordinates: 44°38′37″N 90°36′42″W
- Country: United States
- State: Wisconsin
- County: Clark

Area
  - Total: 36.3 sq mi (94.0 km^{2})
  - Land: 36.1 sq mi (93.6 km^{2})
  - Water: 0.12 sq mi (0.3 km^{2})
- Elevation: 1,096 ft (334 m)

Population (2020)
  - Total: 686
  - Density: 19.0/sq mi (7.33/km^{2})
- Time zone: UTC-6 (Central (CST))
  - Summer (DST): UTC-5 (CDT)
- Area codes: 715 & 534
- FIPS code: 55-85925
- GNIS feature ID: 1584411
- PLSS township: T25N R2W

Weston is a town in Clark County in the U.S. state of Wisconsin. The population was 686 at the 2020 census. The unincorporated communities of Christie and Globe are located in the town.

== Geography ==
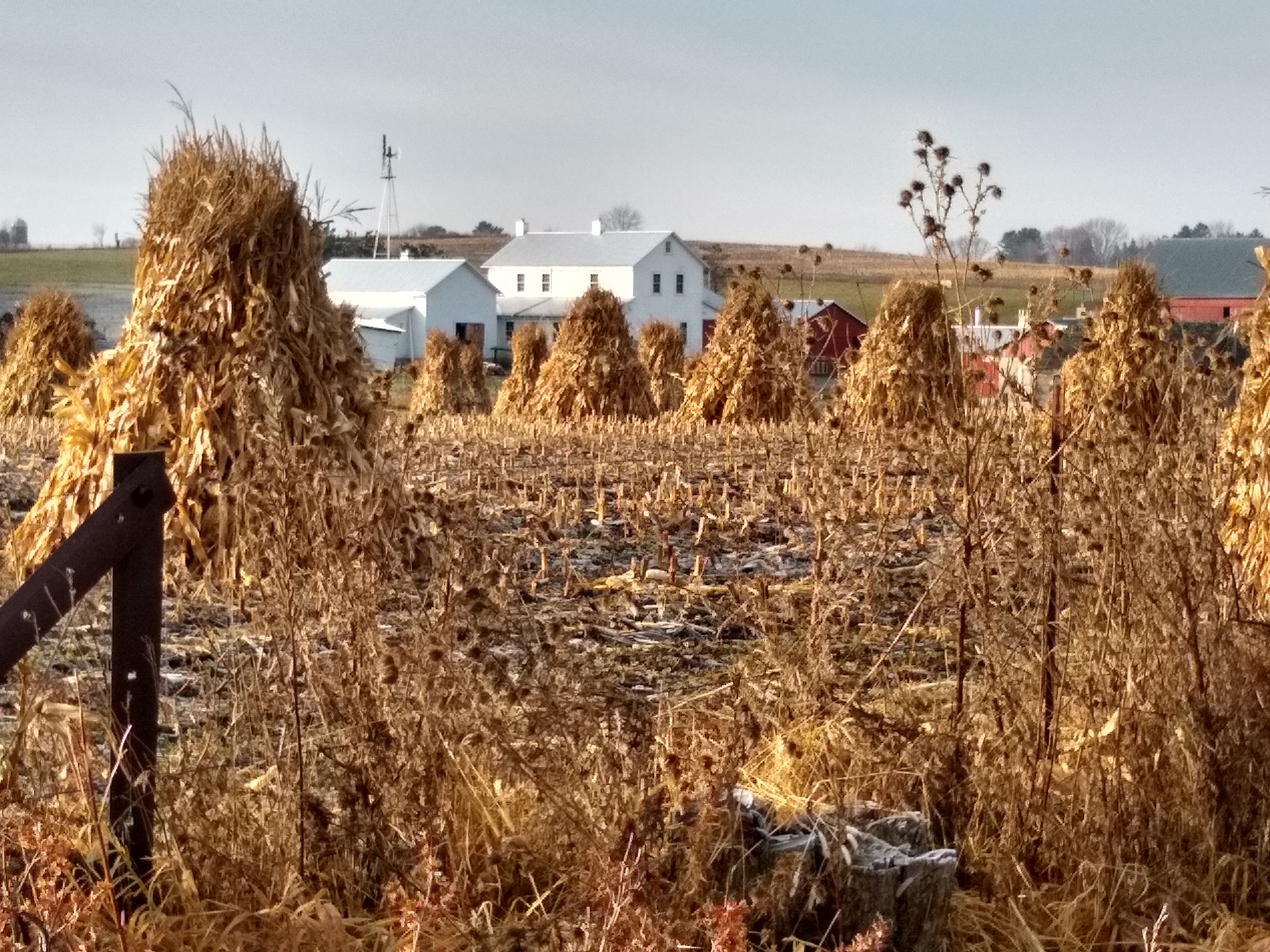
Shocked corn at an Amish farm in Weston

According to the United States Census Bureau, the town has a total area of 36.3 square miles (94.0 km^{2}), of which 36.1 square miles (93.6 km^{2}) is land and 0.1 square mile (0.3 km^{2}) (0.36%) is water.

== History ==
The outline of the six mile square that would become Weston was first surveyed in June 1847 by a crew working for the U.S. government. Then in October of the same year the same crew marked all the section corners in the township, walking through the woods and swamps, measuring with chain and compass. This survey produced a map which shows some sort of road already arcing roughly along the course of future highway 73 on the high ground east of the Black River, an "Indian Camp" on the east bank of the Black in sections 21 or 22, and a cabin on the west bank in section 4. When done, the deputy surveyor filed this general description:

This Township is well Situated for agricultural purposes(?) the Central and South Western parts are gently rolling and heavily timbered with Sugar Lind White and Black Oak timber. the SE part has an extensive body of White Pine timber on it of the best quality for this country the NW part is low & wet but good timber. Perry's Creek which runs through the Eastern part of this township has a Saw Mill on the NE 1/4 Section 35 and many(?) more might be built on this and Black river There is a mill site(?) almost any where on Black river Current rapid & rock bottom all along Some Strong rapids(?)

An 1873 map of Clark County showed a "highway" reaching up from Neillsville through Weston to Greenwood and beyond. Though that road somewhat followed the course of modern Highway 73, it was a dirt wagon road. Another wagon road ran east from 73 along what is now County H for a mile, then wandered south, crossing Cawley Creek. The Town of Weston at that time extended much farther to the west than today, but the map shows no development west of the Black River.

By 1880 Weston consisted of the modern townships of Seif and Weston. The plat map from that year shows more wagon roads. East of the Black River, in addition to the road along 73, forerunners of Suckow Road, Heintown Road, County H, River Avenue, Panther Creek Road, Schofield Road, and Fremont Road were taking shape. Along these wagon roads were sprinkled about 30 settler homesteads. The Christie Post Office is marked on the map, a rural school where Panther Creek Road crosses 73, another school where Schofield Road crosses 73, a sawmill a mile west of there on Cawley Creek, and some sort of "Hotel" where Fremont Road crosses 73. West of the Black, roads and settlers were thinner, with forerunners of H and G and Resewood Avenue drawn in, along with some roads that no longer exist. A rural school was where H now meets Reesewood and another where Chili Road now crosses G. A dozen settlers' homes were marked west of the Black, but much of the land there was still in large blocks, owned by lumbermen and speculators, with the largest shares held by Blakeslee & Austin, Thayer and Kingman, and Samuel Marsh.

By 1890 the Neillsville-to-Withee stage passed through Weston each day, following the dirt road that would become modern highway 73.

By 1893 more roads had been added on both sides of the Black, and more settler homes lining those roads. The plat map from that year shows a new school where 73 now passes Christie Mound. The map shows a new mill, church, and cemetery at Globe. Large chunks of unsettled land were still held by Davis and Starr Lumber Company and Coburn.

By 1906 Weston had its current six by six mile footprint, with Seif split off as a separate township. More roads had been added, and many more settlers. The plat map shows a new sawmill where County G now meets Fremont Road.

Christie is an unincorporated community in Weston on Highway 73 just south of Christie Mound. The 1918 History of Clark County described it at that time: "Christie is located on the old tote road, between Neillsville and Greenwood, and for years was an important postoffice in the county. It now has a store, two churches and a school."

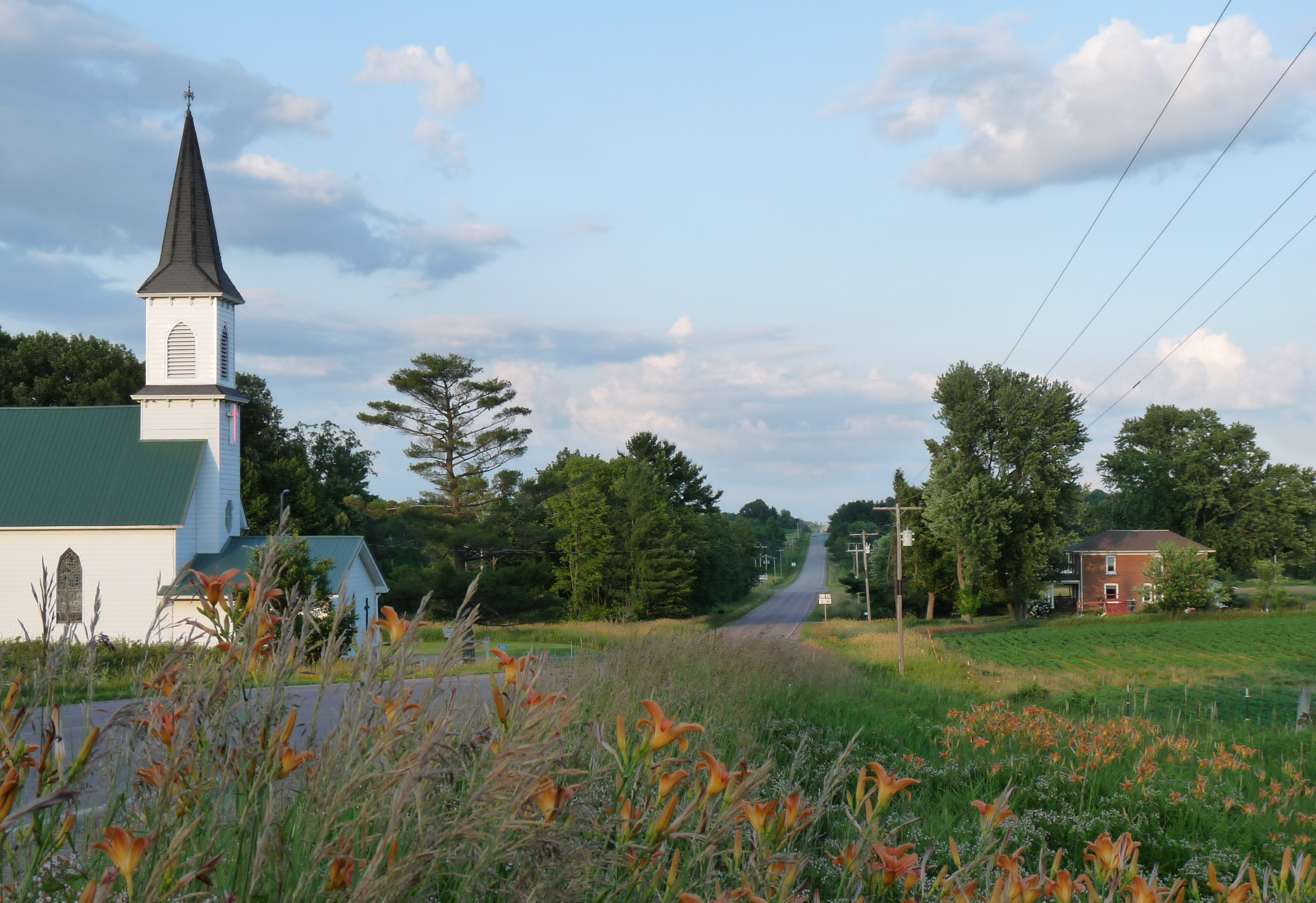
Globe, looking east

Globe was another small rural community that developed a few miles west of Christie to serve local farmers. The 1918 History of Clark County described Globe as "...ten miles north of Neillsville in the center of a prosperous farming community. It has a creamery, a large German Lutheran Church and school, and a store."

By 1920 Weston was largely settled - even west of the river. The plat map shows a cheese factory on what is now Panther Creek Road south of Christie. The transition from logging to agriculture was well underway.

== Demographics ==
As of the census of 2000, there were 638 people, 230 households, and 180 families residing in the town. The population density was 17.7 people per square mile (6.8/km^{2}). There were 267 housing units at an average density of 7.4 per square mile (2.9/km^{2}). The racial makeup of the town was 99.37% White, 0.16% African American, 0.31% Native American and 0.16% Asian. Hispanic or Latino of any race were 0.94% of the population.

There were 230 households, out of which 35.2% had children under the age of 18 living with them, 68.3% were married couples living together, 4.3% had a female householder with no husband present, and 21.7% were non-families. 16.5% of all households were made up of individuals, and 8.3% had someone living alone who was 65 years of age or older. The average household size was 2.77 and the average family size was 3.07.

In the town, the population was spread out, with 27.6% under the age of 18, 7.2% from 18 to 24, 28.7% from 25 to 44, 22.9% from 45 to 64, and 13.6% who were 65 years of age or older. The median age was 38 years. For every 100 females, there were 111.3 males. For every 100 females age 18 and over, there were 107.2 males.

The median income for a household in the town was $40,833, and the median income for a family was $45,833. Males had a median income of $27,417 versus $21,328 for females. The per capita income for the town was $15,478. About 14.2% of families and 17.4% of the population were below the poverty line, including 29.5% of those under age 18 and 12.6% of those age 65 or over.
