= Warner, Wisconsin =

- Town
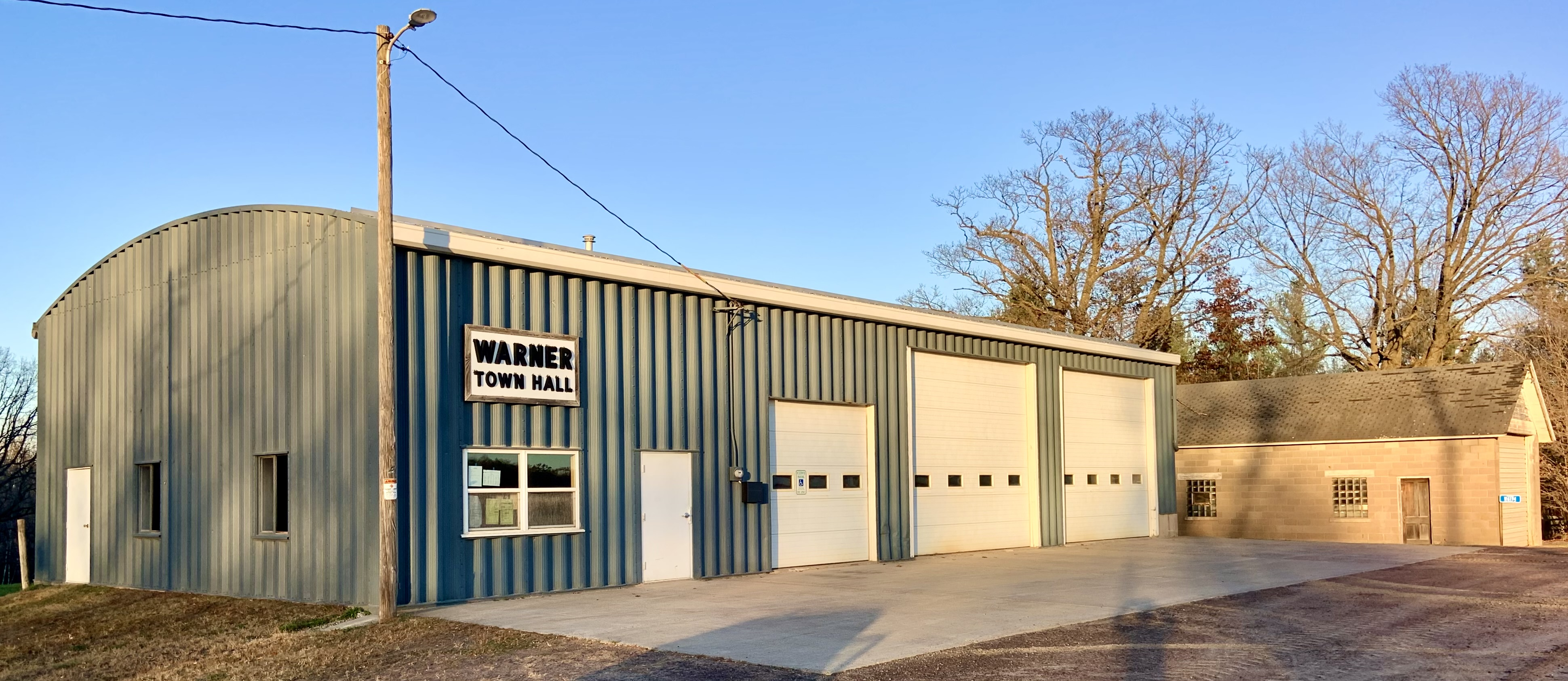
- Town hall

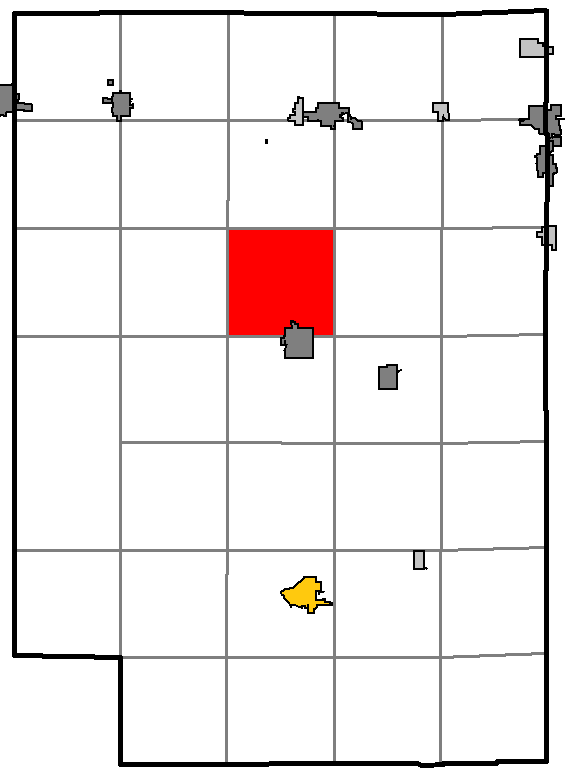
- Location of Warner, Clark County

- Location of Clark County, Wisconsin
- Coordinates: 44°49′1″N 90°36′19″W
- Country: United States
- State: Wisconsin
- County: Clark

Area
  - Total: 35.0 sq mi (90.7 km^{2})
  - Land: 34.9 sq mi (90.3 km^{2})
  - Water: 0.12 sq mi (0.3 km^{2})
- Elevation: 1,201 ft (366 m)

Population (2020)
  - Total: 635
  - Density: 18.2/sq mi (7.03/km^{2})
- Time zone: UTC-6 (Central (CST))
  - Summer (DST): UTC-5 (CDT)
- Area codes: 715 & 534
- FIPS code: 55-83350
- GNIS feature ID: 1584344
- PLSS township: T27N R2W
- Website: https://townofwarner.com/

Warner is a town in Clark County in the U.S. state of Wisconsin. As of the 2020 census, the town had a total population of 635. Hemlock, now a ghost town in Warner, was once a little mill town that grew around a dam below the confluence of the Black and Popple rivers.

== Geography ==
According to the United States Census Bureau, the town has a total area of 35.0 square miles (90.6 km^{2}), of which 34.9 square miles (90.3 km^{2}) are land and 0.1 square mile (0.3 km^{2}) (0.37%) is water.

== History ==
The outline of the six mile square that would become Warner was first surveyed in June 1847 by a crew working for the U.S. government. Then in November 1847 the crew came back to mark all the section corners in the township, walking through the woods and swamps, measuring with chain and compass. When done, the deputy surveyor filed this general description:

This township is low gently rolling Soil about Second rate and heavy timbered with W. Pine Sugar Lyn Elm Birch (?) under growth Prickly Ash(?) then Gooseberry (?) along the Streams (?) (?) part of the township there is Considerable good Pine. Black River runs through this township from North to South Swift water and like a torrent rough(?) rocky channel and numerous Mill sites on it. Considering every thing this township will Soon be Settled with a heavy population. Plenty of good routes(?) through(?) the(?) township(?).

An 1873 map of Clark County showed one road, reaching up from Neillsville through Greenwood and Warner, across the Popple River and into what would become Longwood. Though the road followed the course of modern Highway 73, this was a dirt wagon road.

In 1879 the Black River Improvement Company built a "flooding dam" below the confluence of the Black and Popple rivers, which could be opened to flush logs down the river when the natural floods were insufficient. Frederick Limprecht and N.H. Withee powered a gristmill from this dam, and Withee built a sawmill with an "upright and rotary saw." The following year C.G. Reul added a shingle mill. Limprecht built the first home in what would become the hamlet of Hemlock.

By 1880 the Town of Warner was six miles from north to south and eighteen miles across, reaching from the west edge of Clark County through the modern town of Warner. The 1880 plat map shows seven structures in Hemlock, a school a half mile to the east, and a "hotel" a mile up the Popple River. Much of Warner's land was owned in large blocks by logging operations and land speculators, with C.C. Washburn, N.H. Withee, and W.H. Mead holding the largest share. Only a few roads had been added east of the Black River, mostly in the southeast corner north of Greenwood. West of the river, early wagon road segments of Century Road, Sidney Avenue, Capital Road, Riplinger Road and County O were in place. Farmers had begun to settle along these roads, especially in the south, and other schools had appeared: a mile and a half northeast of Greenwood, near the future crossing of Century Road and School Avenue, where Capitol Avenue crosses County O, and north of where Popple River Road crosses O. A "German church" had also appeared where Century Avenue now crosses O.

An 1890 promotional pamphlet described Hemlock: "The little village of Hemlock, on Black River... has two large mills, one flour mill and one lumber, shingle and lath mill.... Hemlock is the northern terminus of the telephone line which extends south to La Crosse, and east to the towns of the Wisconsin Central Line." At that time, Hemlock was on a daily stage line which ran from Neillsville up through Hemlock and Warner to Longwood and then Withee.

By 1893 not much had changed. Warner was still eighteen miles wide. Much of the town was still owned in large chunks by loggers and speculators, with J.J. Hogan a new major owner. Some of the wagon roads had been extended and more settlers had appeared along those roads. A sawmill had appeared on the map at Hemlock.

By 1906, the eastern 12 miles of Warner were split off into the Town of Mead, leaving Warner with its current six by six-mile footprint. More roads had been added, and many more settlers, with 80-acre farms common. T.O. Withee now held most of the large tracts of land, but J.S. Owen Lumber Co. had appeared on the map. Another sawmill had appeared on the Black River just north of Greenwood, and the Fairchild and Northeastern Railroad cut across the southeast corner of Warner, heading from Willard toward Owen.

A 1914 flood of the Black River washed out Hemlock's dam and mill. A 1919 history described Hemlock as an "abandoned village in Warner Township, deriving its name from an island of hemlock trees now washed away.... Nothing now remains but the ruined dam, and the abandoned buildings."

The plat map of Warner from around 1920 shows the modern road grid nearly complete and most of Warner settled. Three cheese factories had appeared: one east of Hemlock where Kingston Road now crosses highway 73, another where Sidney Avenue now meets Century Road, and another where County O meets MM. The transition from logging to agriculture was well underway.

== Demographics ==
As of the census of 2000, there were 627 people, 195 households, and 164 families residing in the town. The population density was 18.0 people per square mile (6.9/km^{2}). There were 208 housing units at an average density of 6.0 per square mile (2.3/km^{2}). The racial makeup of the town was 98.41% White, 1.28% Asian, and 0.32% from two or more races. Hispanic or Latino of any race were 0.16% of the population.

There were 195 households, out of which 47.2% had children under the age of 18 living with them, 75.4% were married couples living together, 4.6% had a female householder with no husband present, and 15.4% were non-families. 13.3% of all households were made up of individuals, and 7.7% had someone living alone who was 65 years of age or older. The average household size was 3.16 and the average family size was 3.44.

In the town, the population was spread out, with 35.1% under the age of 18, 5.7% from 18 to 24, 26.3% from 25 to 44, 22.2% from 45 to 64, and 10.7% who were 65 years of age or older. The median age was 35 years. For every 100 females, there were 101.6 males. For every 100 females age 18 and over, there were 106.6 males.

The median income for a household in the town was $37,273, and the median income for a family was $40,179. Males had a median income of $34,167 versus $21,042 for females. The per capita income for the town was $13,443. About 3.8% of families and 7.9% of the population were below the poverty line, including 7.7% of those under age 18 and 4.0% of those age 65 or over.
