= Green Grove, Wisconsin =

- Town
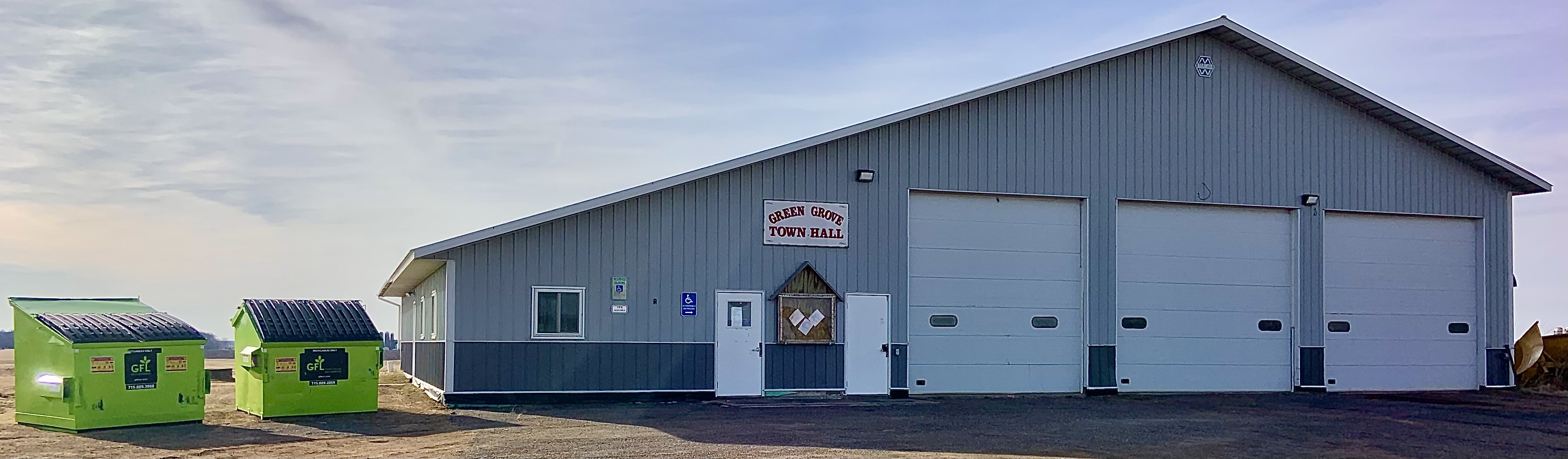
- Town hall

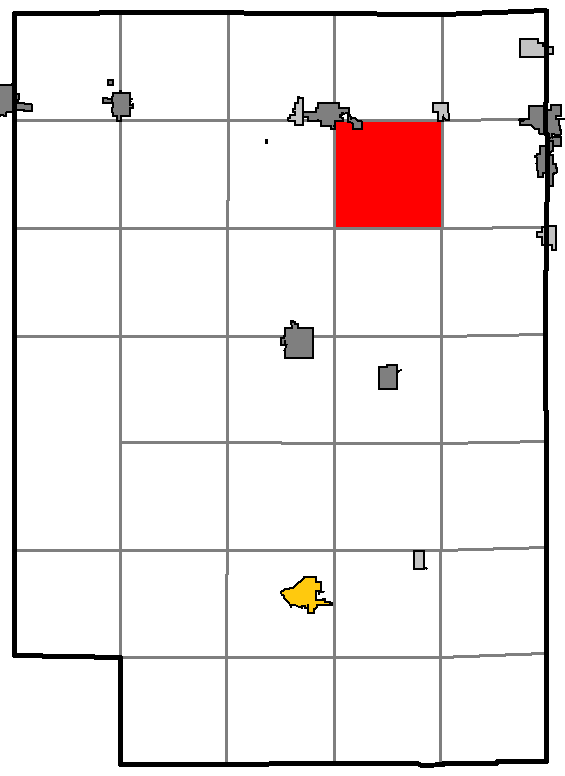
- Location of Green Grove, Clark County

- Location of Clark County, Wisconsin
- Coordinates: 44°54′7″N 90°29′27″W
- Country: United States
- State: Wisconsin
- County: Clark

Area
  - Total: 36.2 sq mi (93.8 km^{2})
  - Land: 36.0 sq mi (93.2 km^{2})
  - Water: 0.19 sq mi (0.5 km^{2})
- Elevation: 1,276 ft (389 m)

Population (2020)
  - Total: 748
  - Density: 20.8/sq mi (8.03/km^{2})
- Time zone: UTC-6 (Central (CST))
  - Summer (DST): UTC-5 (CDT)
- Area codes: 715 & 534
- FIPS code: 55-31275
- GNIS feature ID: 1583317
- PLSS township: T21N R1W
- Website: https://townofgreengrovewi.gov/

Green Grove is a town in Clark County in the U.S. state of Wisconsin. The population was 748 at the 2020 census, down from 756 at the 2010 census. The unincorporated communities of Atwood and Bright are located in the town.

== Geography ==
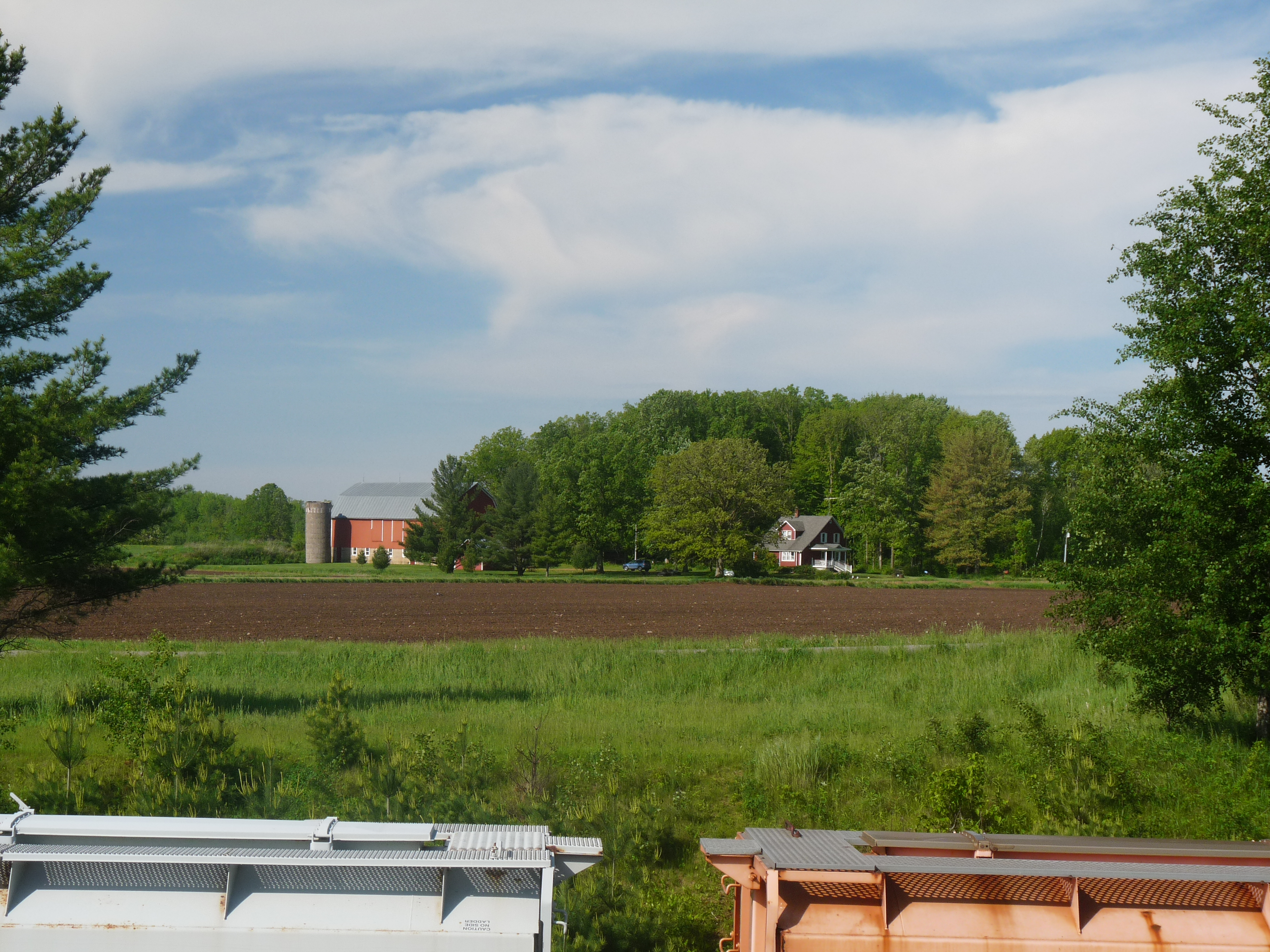
A small farm viewed from the railroad overpass on Robin Avenue

The town of Green Grove is in northeastern Clark County. It is bordered to the northwest by the city of Owen and at its northeastern corner by the village of Curtiss. According to the United States Census Bureau, the town has a total area of 36.2 square miles (93.8 km^{2}), of which 36.0 square miles (93.2 km^{2}) is land and 0.2 square miles (0.5 km^{2}), or 0.58%, is water.

The terrain of most of Green Grove is fairly flat, with soils mostly "deep, nearly level to sloping, poorly drained to moderately well-drained, silty soils on ground moraines." Most of the bedrock underneath is Mount Simon sandstone, interspersed with some areas of volcanic and metavolcanic rock.

== History ==
Some of the early European Americans to walk the six mile square that would become Green Grove were the U.S. government's surveyors. From 1845 to 1847 they surveyed the outline of the township on foot with chain and compass. Then others came back in January 1853 to survey all the section lines. When done, the deputy surveyor filed this general description:

This Township is nearly entirely(?) level a great part of it Swampy and unfit for cultivation. The part Which is not swamp is but little elevated above(?) Swamp, Soil 3rd(?) rate, thickly timbered with Pine, ? and Elm, very(?) free from undergrowth, but few Streams and those Small Except One Near the Northwest part of the Town. of Some Size that With all the rest bears N. West(?)

Once the land was surveyed, the federal government began selling parcels to private individuals and lumber companies. The first land patent in Green Grove was in 1856 - a sale of 40 acres in section 11 to a John Lewis.

By 1880 the area that would become Green Grove was the western half of an early Town of Colby. Some sort of road ran along what is now County E, with a Green Grove post office where E now meets Eddy Road. Settlers had farms ranging from 40 to 160 acres for the first mile. Beyond that eastern mile, most of the 6-mile square was in larger parcels owned by lumber companies, with D.J. Spaulding Estate owning the largest portion, followed by J.S. Keator and Bright and Withee. Some sort of wagon road followed the course of modern County N across the township. In 1886 the 6 by 6-mile Town of Green Grove was split out from the Town of Colby.

By 1906 the roads and farms had filled in a little, but much of the west and north of Green Grove was still in the hands of lumber companies like J.S. Owen and H.A. Bright. The Fairchild and Northeastern Railroad was under construction, arcing across the west end of the township on its way from Willard to Owen, with Bright post office where the F&NE crossed the road that is now County N. A schoolhouse stood on that same road at the west end of Green Grove. Other schools stood where modern Sparrow meets Popple River Road, on Oak Grove Avenue north of Eddy Road, and on N west of Oak Grove. A town hall was at the intersection of N and Romadka.

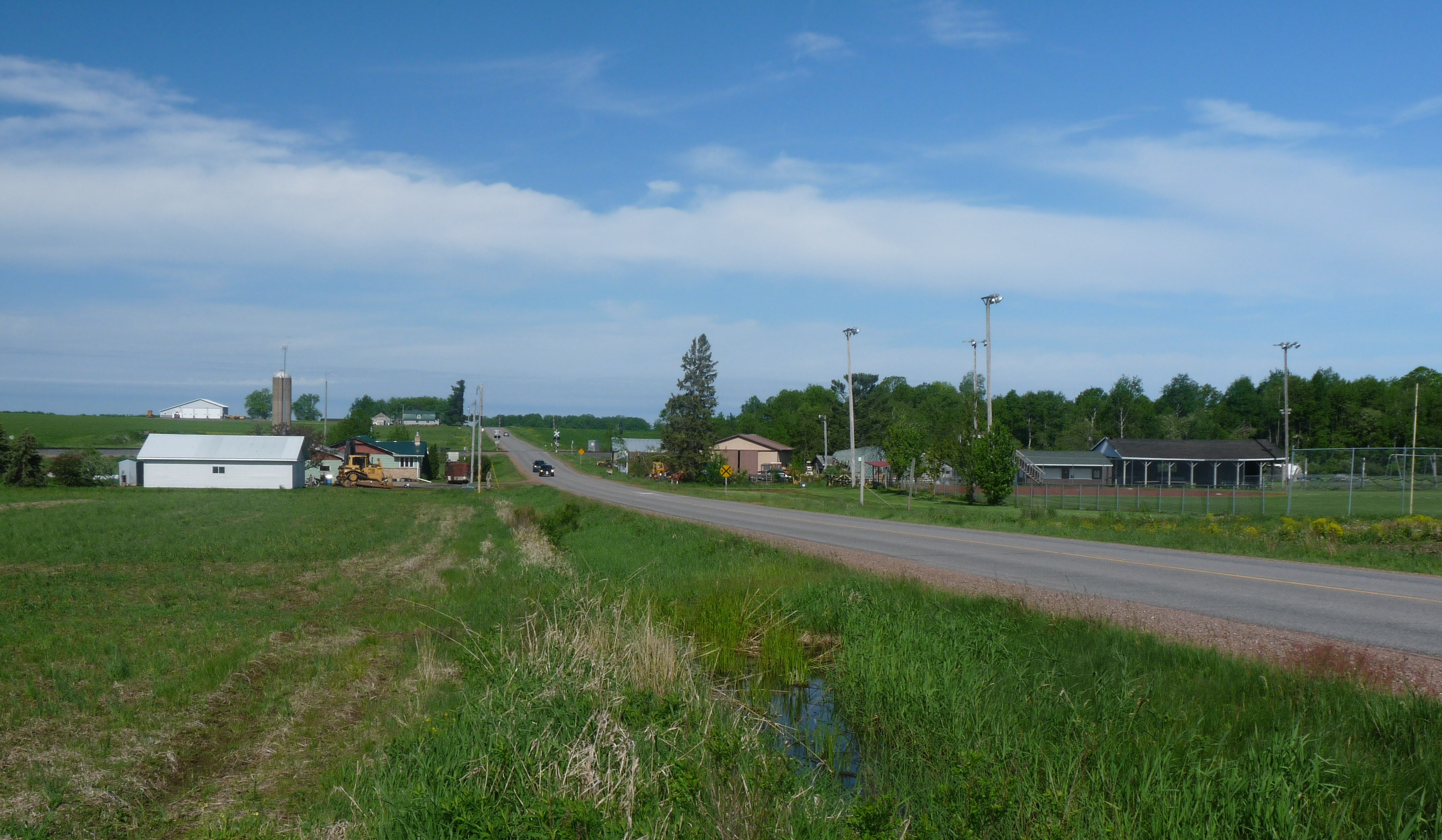
Atwood is still a rail crossing, with a ball field and a few buildings

In 1910, the Soo Line Railroad built a railroad line diagonal across the town of Green Grove, connecting Spencer with Owen. Prior to this, trains heading between Chicago and Superior had to jog out of their direct route up to Abbotsford and over to Owen. The railroad added a couple sidings in the farms and forest and Atwood grew there. The 1918 History of Clark County describes Atwood as "a new village in Section 21, Green Grove, on the "Soo" line, from Spencer to Owen. It contains the railroad station, a store and a saloon.

That same 1918 history book includes this description of the community of Bright: "Bright is located in Section 20, Greenwood (sic) on the Fairchild and Northeastern, between Greenwood and Owen. It has a railroad station, a store, and a cheese factory. The old sawmill is no longer operated."

By 1920 most of the middle and west of Green Grove was filled in with farms. A cheese factory had been started at what is now the corner of Romadka and Oak Road. The transition from logging to dairy was well underway.

== Demographics ==
As of the census of 2000, there were 902 people, 225 households, and 177 families residing in the town. The population density was 24.7 people per square mile (9.5/km^{2}). There were 236 housing units at an average density of 6.5 per square mile (2.5/km^{2}). The racial makeup of the town was 98.89% White, 0.22% Native American, 0.22% Asian, and 0.67% from two or more races. Hispanic or Latino of any race were 0.44% of the population.

There were 225 households, out of which 39.1% had children under the age of 18 living with them, 68.9% were married couples living together, 5.8% had a female householder with no husband present, and 20.9% were non-families. 16.0% of all households were made up of individuals, and 8.9% had someone living alone who was 65 years of age or older. The average household size was 3.11 and the average family size was 3.57.

In the town, the population was spread out, with 27.4% under the age of 18, 6.2% from 18 to 24, 21.7% from 25 to 44, 18.7% from 45 to 64, and 25.9% who were 65 years of age or older. The median age was 41 years. For every 100 females, there were 96.1 males. For every 100 females age 18 and over, there were 96.7 males.

The median income for a household in the town was $37,667, and the median income for a family was $41,023. Males had a median income of $32,120 versus $19,063 for females. The per capita income for the town was $14,067. About 10.4% of families and 13.1% of the population were below the poverty line, including 18.7% of those under age 18 and 14.8% of those age 65 or over.
