= Loyal (town), Wisconsin =

Town in Clark County, Wisconsin

Loyal, Wisconsin
- Town
- Town of Loyal
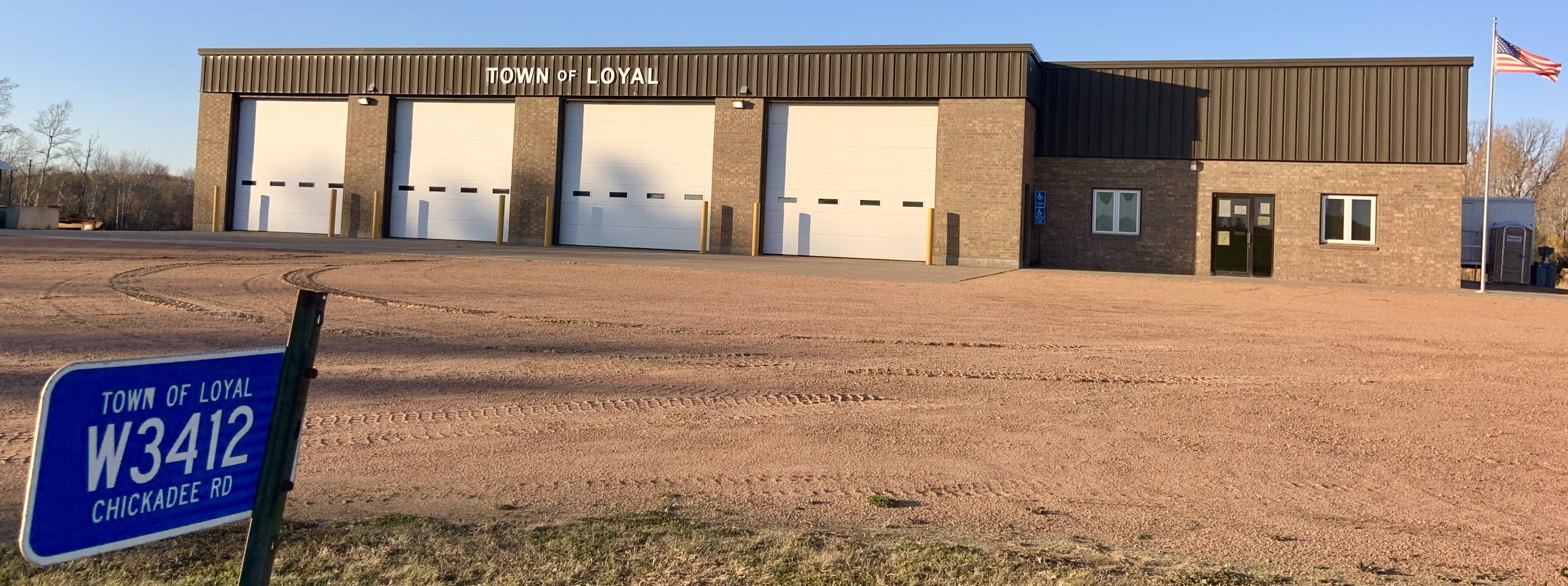
- Loyal Town Hall

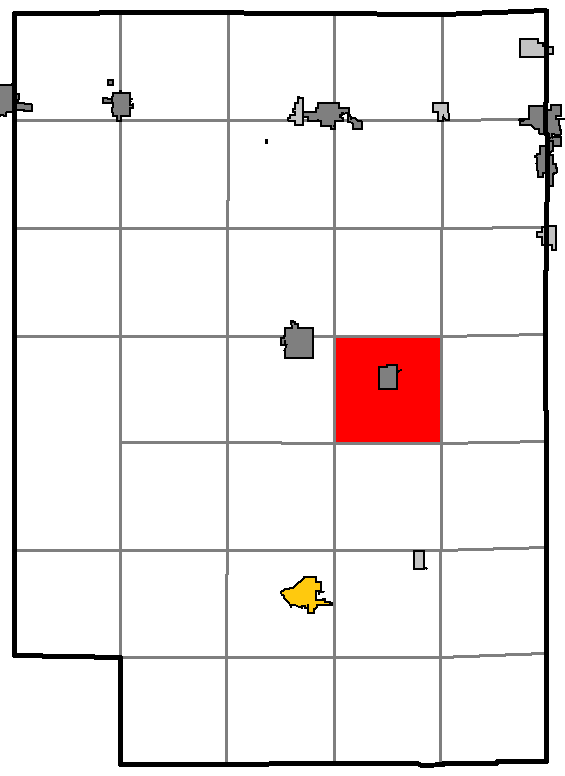
- Location of Loyal, Clark County

- Location of Clark County, Wisconsin
- Coordinates: 44°43′19″N 90°30′27″W
- Country: United States
- State: Wisconsin
- County: Clark

Area
  - Total: 34.75 sq mi (90.0 km^{2})
  - Land: 34.72 sq mi (89.9 km^{2})
  - Water: 0.02 sq mi (0.052 km^{2})

Population (2020)
  - Total: 790
  - Density: 23/sq mi (8.8/km^{2})
- Time zone: UTC-6 (Central (CST))
  - Summer (DST): UTC-5 (CDT)
- Area code(s): 715 and 534
- GNIS feature ID: 1583604

Loyal is a town in Clark County in the U.S. state of Wisconsin. The population was 790 at the 2020 census. The City of Loyal is located within the town. The unincorporated community of Spokeville is also located partially in the town.

== Geography ==
According to the United States Census Bureau, the town has a total area of 34.7 square miles (90.0 km^{2}), all land.

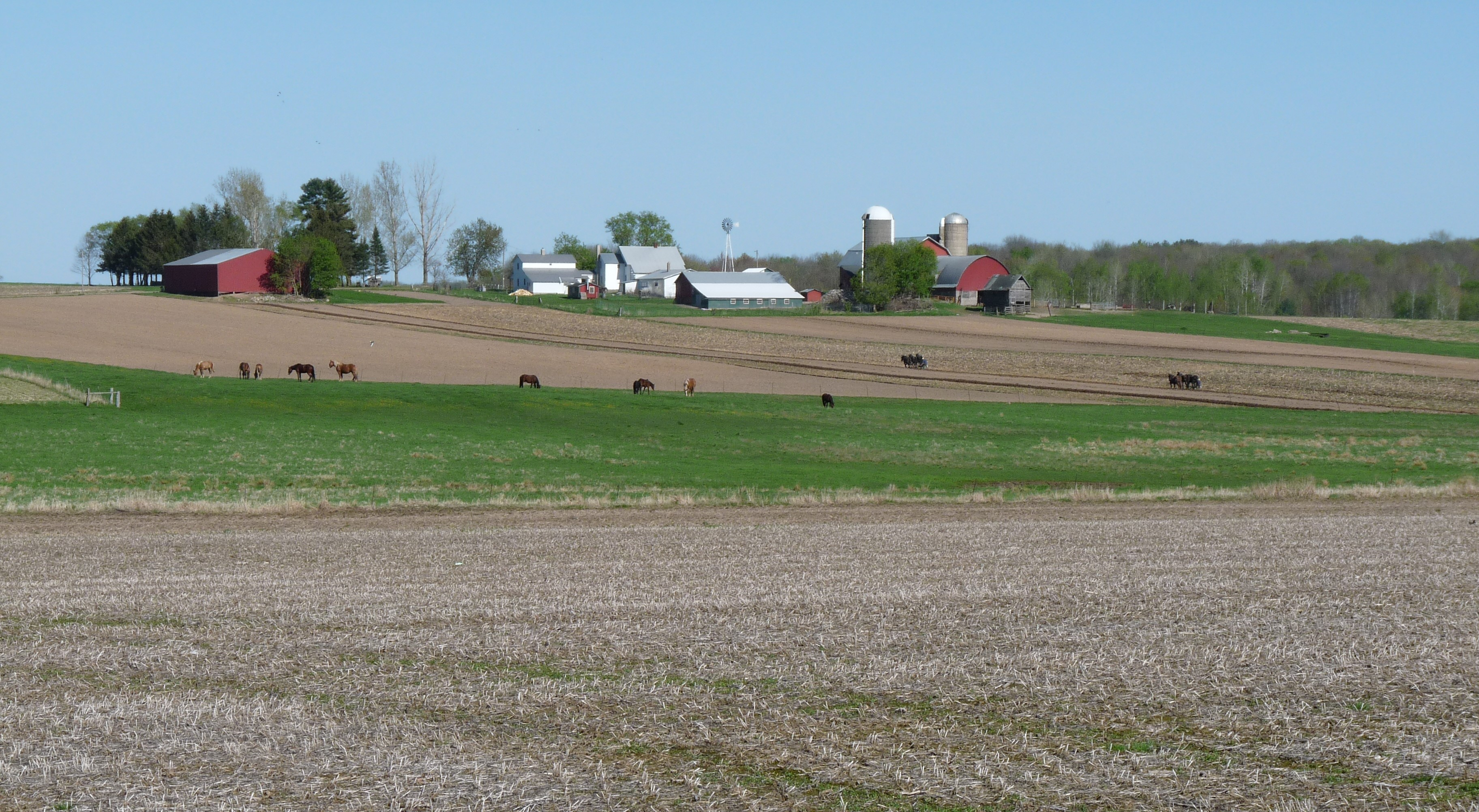
Much of the township is big rolling hills, parts of it farmed by the Amish.

== Demographics ==
As of the census of 2000, there were 787 people, 215 households, and 187 families residing in the town. The population density was 22.7 people per square mile (8.7/km^{2}). There were 225 housing units at an average density of 6.5 per square mile (2.5/km^{2}). The racial makeup of the town was 99.49% White, 0.13% Black or African American and 0.38% Native American. Hispanic or Latino of any race were 0.13% of the population.

There were 215 households, out of which 43.7% had children under the age of 18 living with them, 76.7% were married couples living together, 7.0% had a female householder with no husband present, and 12.6% were non-families. 10.2% of all households were made up of individuals, and 2.3% had someone living alone who was 65 years of age or older. The average household size was 3.66 and the average family size was 3.94.

In the town, the population was spread out, with 38.0% under the age of 18, 10.2% from 18 to 24, 25.4% from 25 to 44, 18.7% from 45 to 64, and 7.8% who were 65 years of age or older. The median age was 27 years. For every 100 females, there were 107.7 males. For every 100 females age 18 and over, there were 115.9 males.

The median income for a household in the town was $45,417, and the median income for a family was $46,667. Males had a median income of $23,828 versus $21,397 for females. The per capita income for the town was $14,023. About 11.7% of families and 15.8% of the population were below the poverty line, including 20.3% of those under age 18 and 4.5% of those age 65 or over.
