= Thorp (town), Wisconsin =

Town in Clark County, Wisconsin

Thorp, Wisconsin
- Town
- Town of Thorp
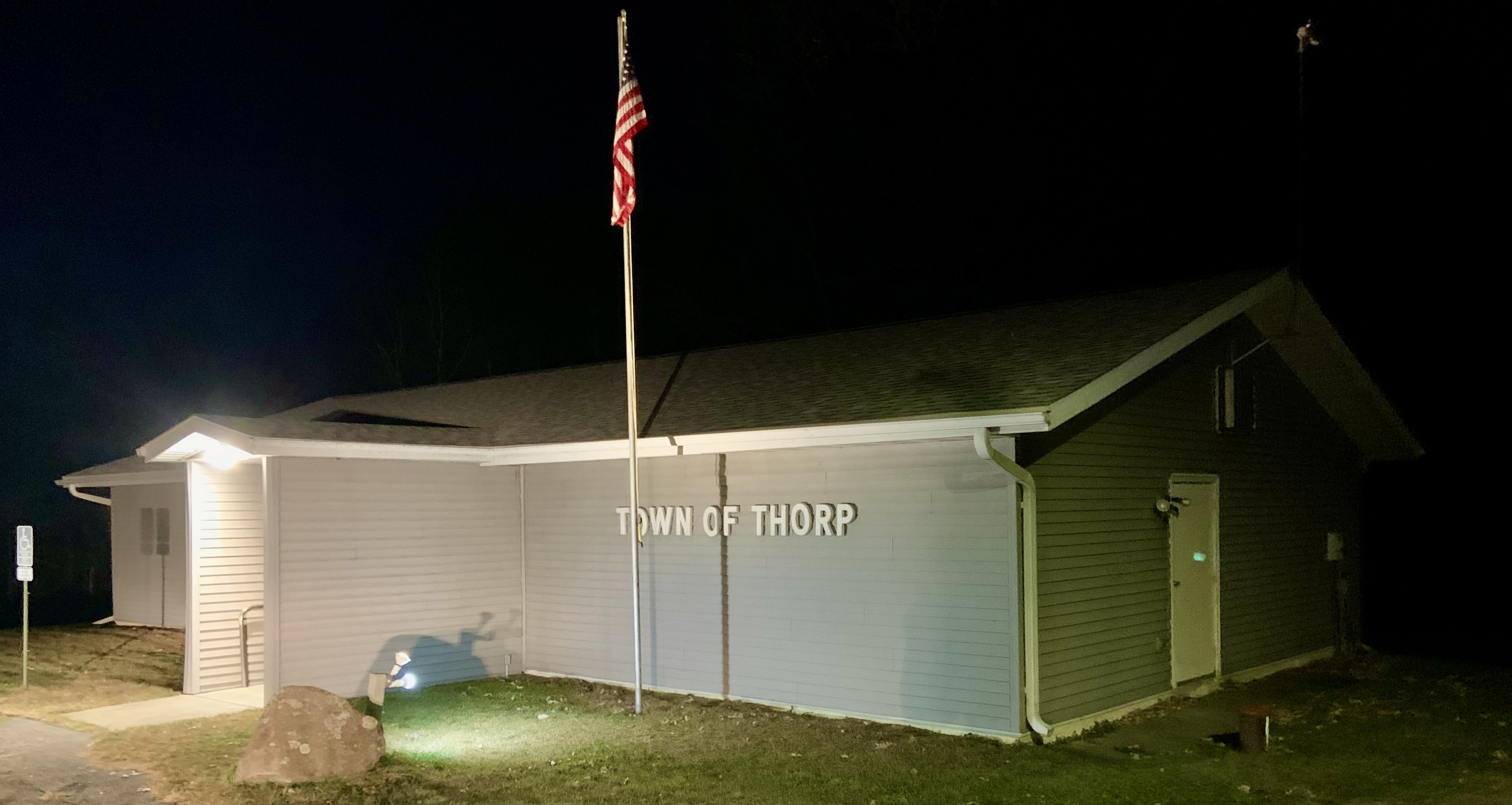
- Thorp Town Hall

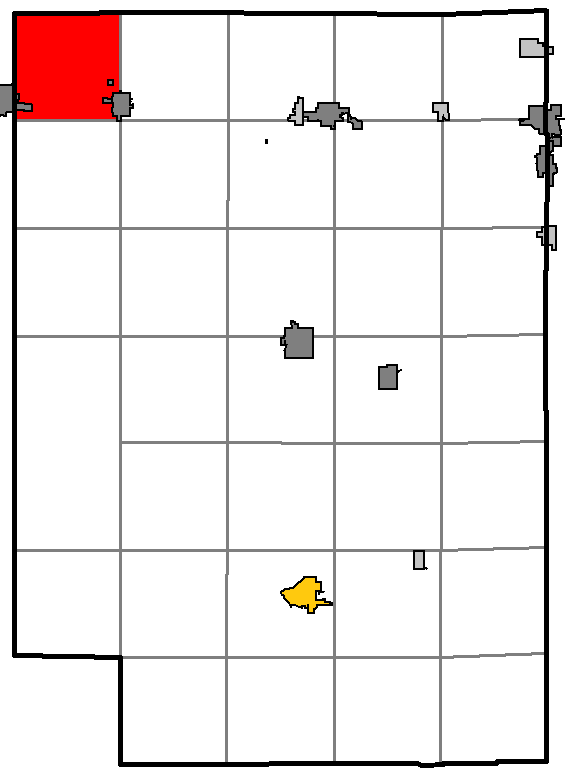
- Location of Thorp, Clark County

- Location of Clark County, Wisconsin
- Coordinates: 44°59′45″N 90°52′14″W
- Country: United States
- State: Wisconsin
- County: Clark

Area
  - Total: 34.63 sq mi (89.7 km^{2})
  - Land: 34.44 sq mi (89.2 km^{2})
  - Water: 0.19 sq mi (0.49 km^{2})

Population (2020)
  - Total: 840
  - Density: 24/sq mi (9.4/km^{2})
- Time zone: UTC-6 (Central (CST))
  - Summer (DST): UTC-5 (CDT)
- Area code(s): 715 and 534
- GNIS feature ID: 1584276
- PLSS township: T29N R4W

Thorp is a town in Clark County in the U.S. state of Wisconsin. The population was 840 at the 2020 census. The unincorporated communities of Eadsville, Eidsvold, and Junction are located in the town as well as a portion of the City of Thorp.

== Geography ==
According to the United States Census Bureau, the town has a total area of 35.2 square miles (91.1 km^{2}), all land.

== History ==
The outline of the six mile square that would become the town of Thorp was first surveyed in the summer of 1847 by a crew working for the U.S. government. Then in late 1849 another crew marked all the section corners in the township, walking through the woods and swamps, measuring with chain and compass. When done, the deputy surveyor filed this general description:

The Surface in this Township is generally level and wet and but a small portion of it in the South East part fit for agricultural purposes. There are two Streams running from North to South through the Eastern part, affording a good supply of water power. There is a good supply of Pine timber in the Township of good quality but it is generally Scattering. The whole Township is heavily wooded with thrifty(?) young timber of nearly every variety

== Demographics ==
As of the census of 2000, there were 730 people, 245 households, and 190 families residing in the town. The population density was 20.8 people per square mile (8.0/km^{2}). There were 255 housing units at an average density of 7.3 per square mile (2.8/km^{2}). The racial makeup of the town was 99.04% White, 0.55% Native American, 0.14% Asian, and 0.27% from two or more races. 0.14% of the population were Hispanic or Latino of any race.

There were 245 households, out of which 42.0% had children under the age of 18 living with them, 67.3% were married couples living together, 5.3% had a female householder with no husband present, and 22.4% were non-families. 18.0% of all households were made up of individuals, and 7.3% had someone living alone who was 65 years of age or older. The average household size was 2.98 and the average family size was 3.42.

In the town, the population was spread out, with 32.2% under the age of 18, 7.9% from 18 to 24, 27.3% from 25 to 44, 21.2% from 45 to 64, and 11.4% who were 65 years of age or older. The median age was 35 years. For every 100 females, there were 118.6 males. For every 100 females age 18 and over, there were 120.0 males.

The median income for a household in the town was $39,063, and the median income for a family was $42,750. Males had a median income of $26,389 versus $18,984 for females. The per capita income for the town was $16,236. About 7.7% of families and 8.9% of the population were below the poverty line, including 10.2% of those under age 18 and 13.4% of those age 65 or over.

== Town Board ==
The town board meets monthly at the Town of Thorp town hall located on County Highway X. The town board consists of a town chairman, two supervisors, a clerk, and a treasurer. The town also has a hired man who does work in the town.
