= Levis, Wisconsin =

- Town
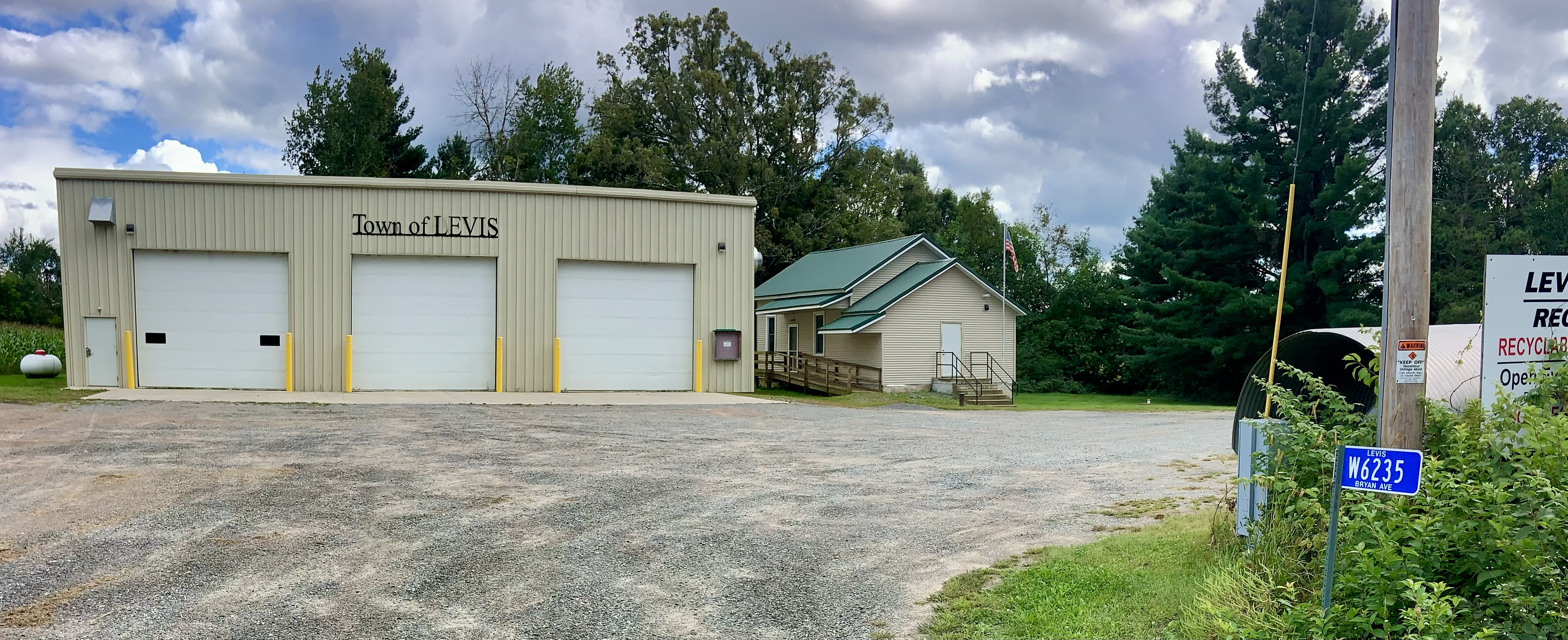
- Town hall

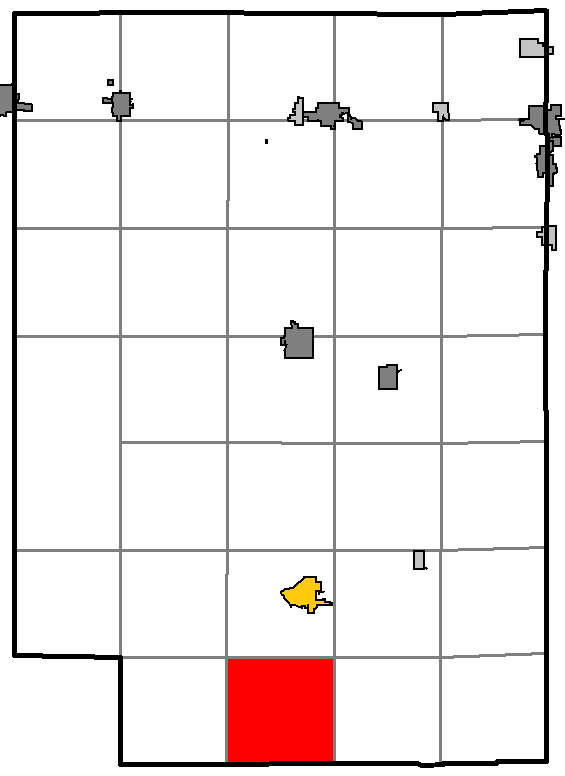
- Location of Levis, Clark County

- Location of Clark County, Wisconsin
- Coordinates: 44°28′21″N 90°38′24″W
- Country: United States
- State: Wisconsin
- County: Clark

Area
  - Total: 36.2 sq mi (93.7 km^{2})
  - Land: 35.9 sq mi (92.9 km^{2})
  - Water: 0.31 sq mi (0.8 km^{2})
- Elevation: 958 ft (292 m)

Population (2020)
  - Total: 437
  - Density: 12.2/sq mi (4.70/km^{2})
- Time zone: UTC-6 (Central (CST))
  - Summer (DST): UTC-5 (CDT)
- Area codes: 715 & 534
- FIPS code: 55-43700
- GNIS feature ID: 1583548

Levis is a town in Clark County in the U.S. state of Wisconsin. The population was 437 at the 2020 census.

== Geography ==
According to the United States Census Bureau, the town has a total area of 36.2 square miles (93.7 km^{2}), of which 35.9 square miles (93.0 km^{2}) is land and 0.3 square mile (0.8 km^{2}) (0.80%) is water.

== Demographics ==
As of the census of 2000, there were 504 people, 191 households, and 138 families residing in the town. The population density was 14.0 people per square mile (5.4/km^{2}). There were 233 housing units at an average density of 6.5 per square mile (2.5/km^{2}). The racial makeup of the town was 94.25% White and 5.75% Native American. Hispanic or Latino of any race were 0.79% of the population.

There were 191 households, out of which 33.0% had children under the age of 18 living with them, 60.2% were married couples living together, 5.2% had a female householder with no husband present, and 27.7% were non-families. 24.6% of all households were made up of individuals, and 8.9% had someone living alone who was 65 years of age or older. The average household size was 2.64 and the average family size was 3.12.

In the town, the population was spread out, with 28.2% under the age of 18, 8.9% from 18 to 24, 24.2% from 25 to 44, 26.2% from 45 to 64, and 12.5% who were 65 years of age or older. The median age was 37 years. For every 100 females, there were 125.0 males. For every 100 females age 18 and over, there were 120.7 males.

The median income for a household in the town was $30,521, and the median income for a family was $33,958. Males had a median income of $25,703 versus $19,167 for females. The per capita income for the town was $14,924. About 9.7% of families and 10.6% of the population were below the poverty line, including 13.0% of those under age 18 and 20.7% of those age 65 or over.
