= Mayville, Clark County, Wisconsin =

Mayville, Wisconsin
- Town
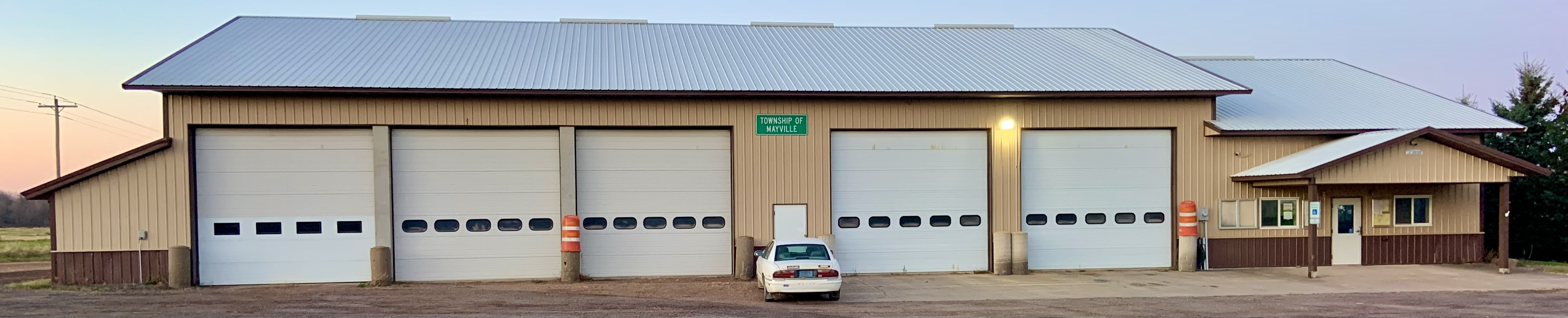
- Town hall

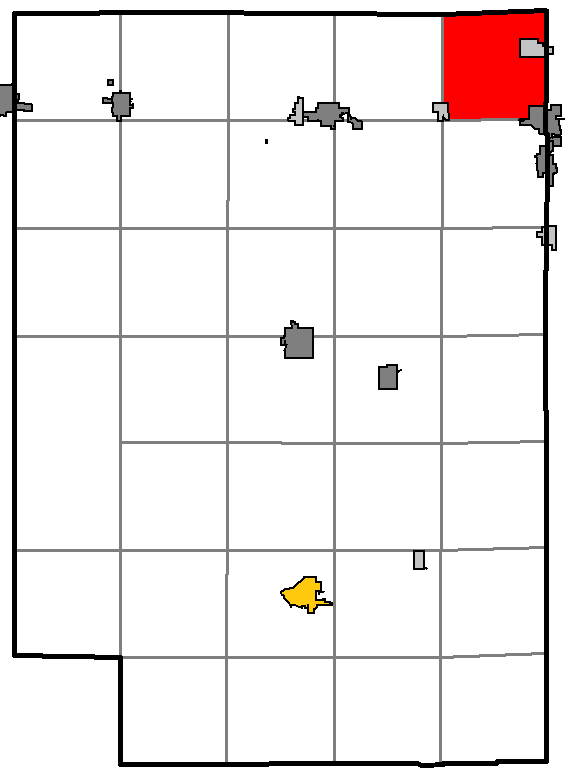
- Location of Mayville, Clark County

- Location of Clark County, Wisconsin
- Coordinates: 44°59′21″N 90°22′25″W
- Country: United States
- State: Wisconsin
- County: Clark

Area
  - Total: 32.5 sq mi (84.1 km^{2})
  - Land: 32.4 sq mi (83.9 km^{2})
  - Water: 0.077 sq mi (0.2 km^{2})
- Elevation: 1,365 ft (416 m)

Population (2020)
  - Total: 963
  - Density: 29.7/sq mi (11.5/km^{2})
- Time zone: UTC-6 (Central (CST))
  - Summer (DST): UTC-5 (CDT)
- Area codes: 715 & 534
- FIPS code: 55-50175
- GNIS feature ID: 1583675

Mayville is a town in Clark County in the U.S. state of Wisconsin. The population was 963 at the 2020 census.

== Geography ==
According to the United States Census Bureau, the town has a total area of 32.5 square miles (84.0 km^{2}), of which 32.4 square miles (83.9 km^{2}) is land and 0.1 square mile (0.2 km^{2}) (0.18%) is water.

== Demographics ==
As of the census of 2000, there were 919 people, 295 households, and 243 families residing in the town. The population density was 28.4 people per square mile (11.0/km^{2}). There were 301 housing units at an average density of 9.3 per square mile (3.6/km^{2}). The racial makeup of the town was 98.15% White, 0.33% Native American, 0.54% from other races, and 0.98% from two or more races. Hispanic or Latino of any race were 1.74% of the population.

There were 295 households, out of which 39.0% had children under the age of 18 living with them, 73.9% were married couples living together, 6.8% had a female householder with no husband present, and 17.3% were non-families. 12.2% of all households were made up of individuals, and 4.1% had someone living alone who was 65 years of age or older. The average household size was 3.12 and the average family size was 3.47.

In the town, the population was spread out, with 31.4% under the age of 18, 10.4% from 18 to 24, 26.4% from 25 to 44, 20.2% from 45 to 64, and 11.4% who were 65 years of age or older. The median age was 33 years. For every 100 females, there were 104.2 males. For every 100 females age 18 and over, there were 107.2 males.

The median income for a household in the town was $42,813, and the median income for a family was $49,167. Males had a median income of $28,864 versus $20,391 for females. The per capita income for the town was $17,329. About 5.0% of families and 8.0% of the population were below the poverty line, including 11.3% of those under age 18 and 9.9% of those age 65 or over.
