= Lynn, Wisconsin =

- Town
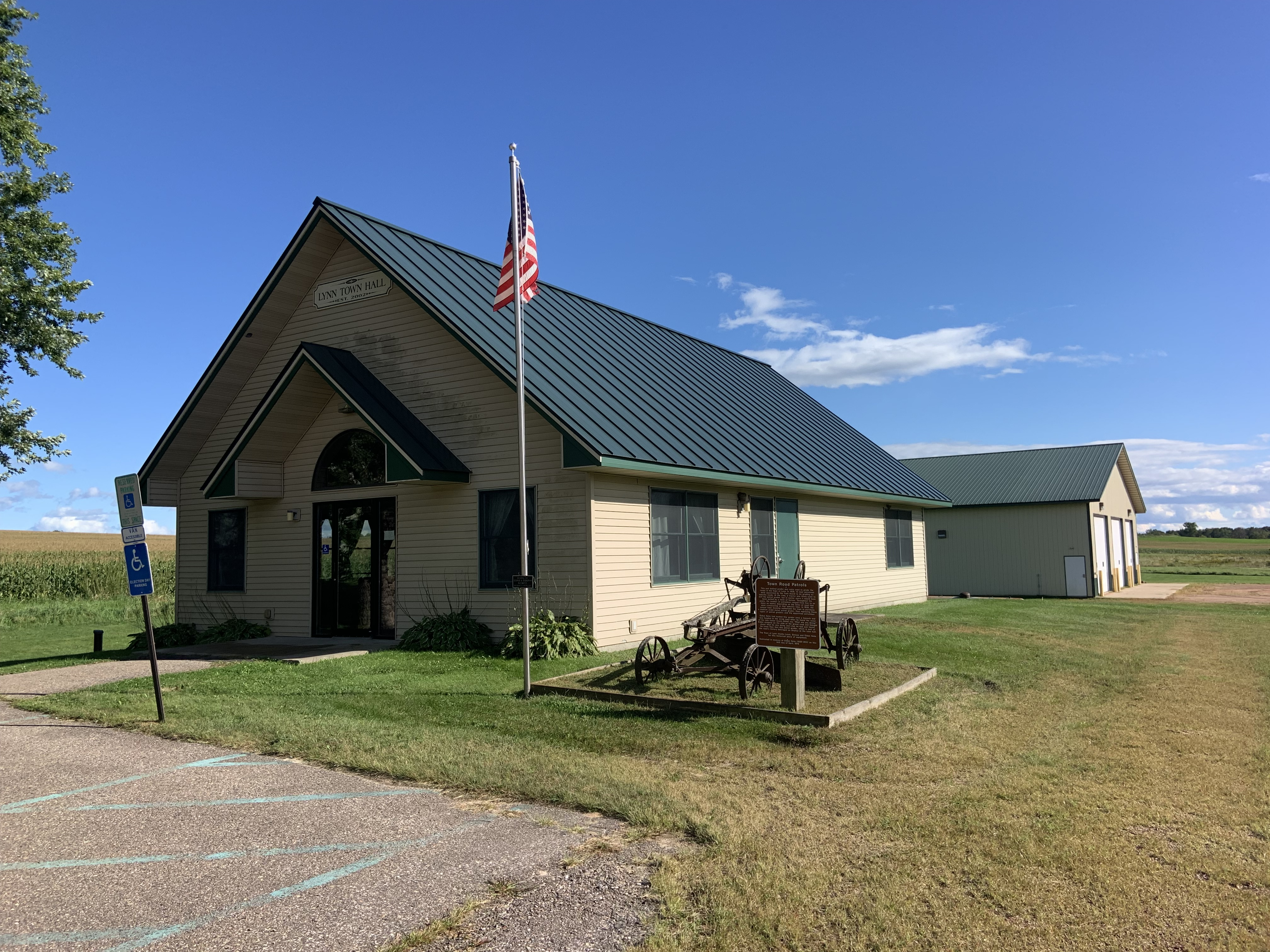
- Town hall

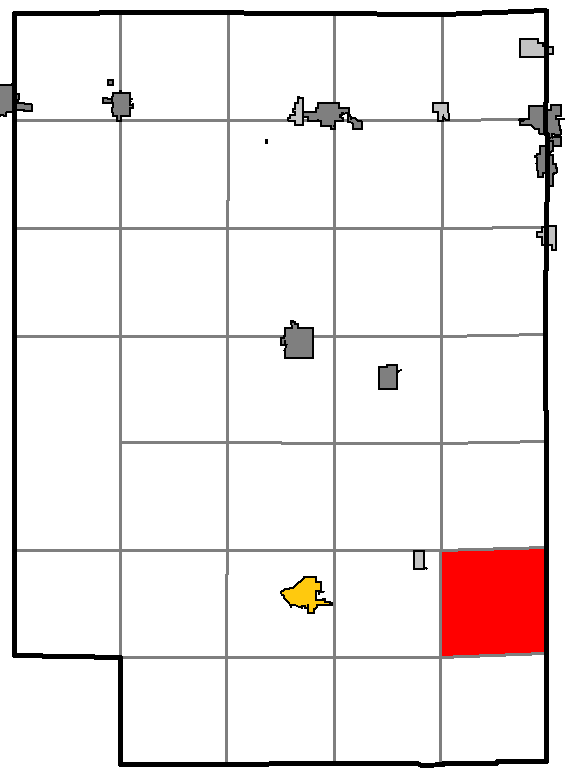
- Location of Lynn, Clark County

- Location of Clark County, Wisconsin
- Coordinates: 44°33′41″N 90°23′10″W
- Country: United States
- State: Wisconsin
- County: Clark

Area
  - Total: 35.6 sq mi (92.2 km^{2})
  - Land: 35.5 sq mi (92.0 km^{2})
  - Water: 0.039 sq mi (0.1 km^{2})
- Elevation: 1,119 ft (341 m)

Population (2020)
  - Total: 834
  - Density: 23.5/sq mi (9.07/km^{2})
- Time zone: UTC-6 (Central (CST))
  - Summer (DST): UTC-5 (CDT)
- Area codes: 715 & 534
- FIPS code: 55-46625
- GNIS feature ID: 1583615
- Website: https://townoflynn.com/

Lynn is a town in Clark County in the U.S. state of Wisconsin. The population was 834 at the 2020 census.

== Geography ==
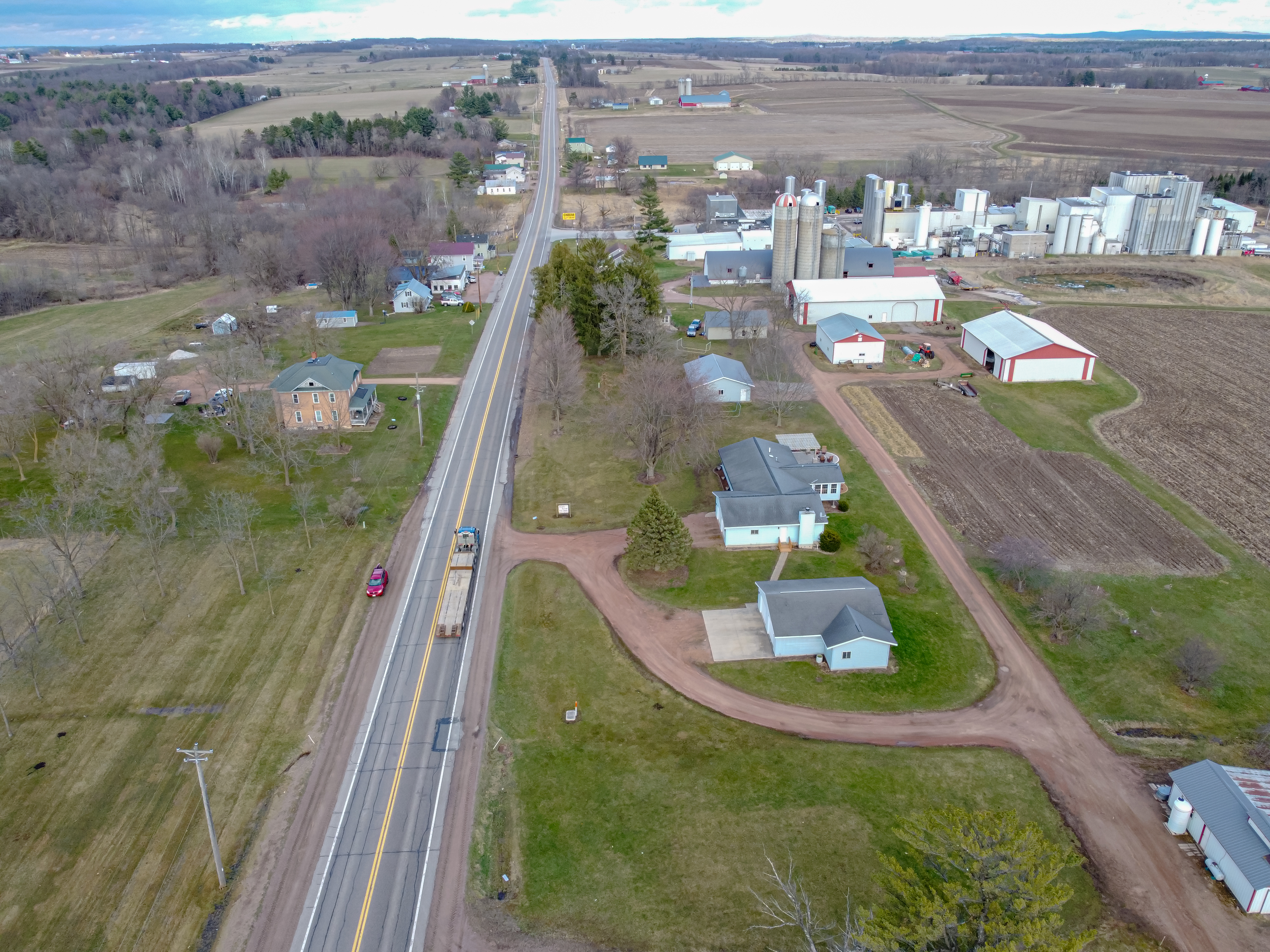

According to the United States Census Bureau, the town has a total area of 35.6 square miles (92.2 km^{2}), of which 35.5 square miles (92.0 km^{2}) is land and 0.1 square mile (0.2 km^{2}) (0.17%) is water.

== Demographics ==
As of the census of 2000, there were 834 people, 251 households, and 204 families living in the town. The population density was 23.5 people per square mile (9.1/km^{2}). There were 292 housing units at an average density of 8.2 per square mile (3.2/km^{2}). The racial makeup of the town was 98.08% White, 0.72% Asian, and 1.20% from two or more races. Hispanic or Latino of any race were 0.12% of the population.

There were 251 households, out of which 42.6% had children under the age of 18 living with them, 74.1% were married couples living together, 4.0% had a female householder with no husband present, and 18.7% were non-families. 15.9% of all households were made up of individuals, and 8.4% had someone living alone who was 65 years of age or older. The average household size was 3.32 and the average family size was 3.80.

In the town, the population was spread out, with 36.9% under the age of 18, 9.2% from 18 to 24, 25.7% from 25 to 44, 18.7% from 45 to 64, and 9.5% who were 65 years of age or older. The median age was 29 years. For every 100 females, there were 99.0 males. For every 100 females age 18 and over, there were 96.3 males.

The median income for a household in the town was $32,396, and the median income for a family was $40,278. Males had a median income of $30,455 versus $21,458 for females. The per capita income for the town was $13,624. About 16.8% of families and 23.0% of the population were below the poverty line, including 31.2% of those under age 18 and 19.1% of those age 65 or over.

== History ==
The history of Lynn, Wisconsin is deeply rooted in the early settlement and development of Clark County. Topics covered in the history of Clark County, Wisconsin, include topography, Indians, early government, early settlement, politics, lumbering, transportation, agriculture, education, the press, the courts, religious life.

== Culture ==
The racial makeup of the town was 98.08% White, 0.72% Asian, and 1.20% from two or more races. Hispanic or Latino of any race were 0.12% of the population. Lynn is known for its community culture, with events such as the Chili Street Dance and the Clark County Fair attracting residents and visitors alike.

== Education ==
The education system in Lynn, Wisconsin is part of the larger Clark County educational network. The focus on education in the area is evident in the numerous schools and educational programs available to residents.

== Tourism ==
Lynn has a variety of activities for every season. The town is known for its motor speedways and berry patches.
