= Seif, Wisconsin =

- Town
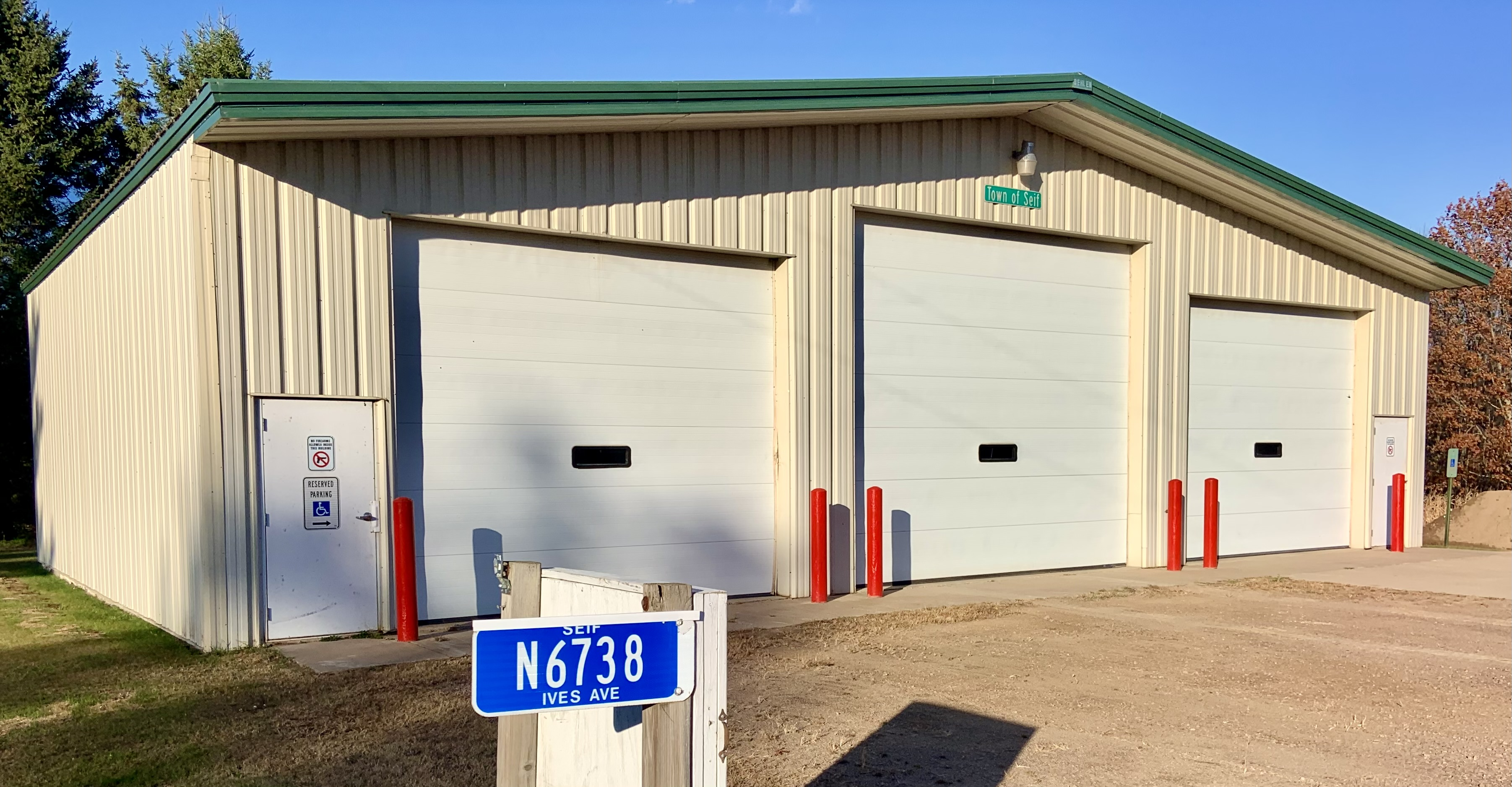
- Town hall

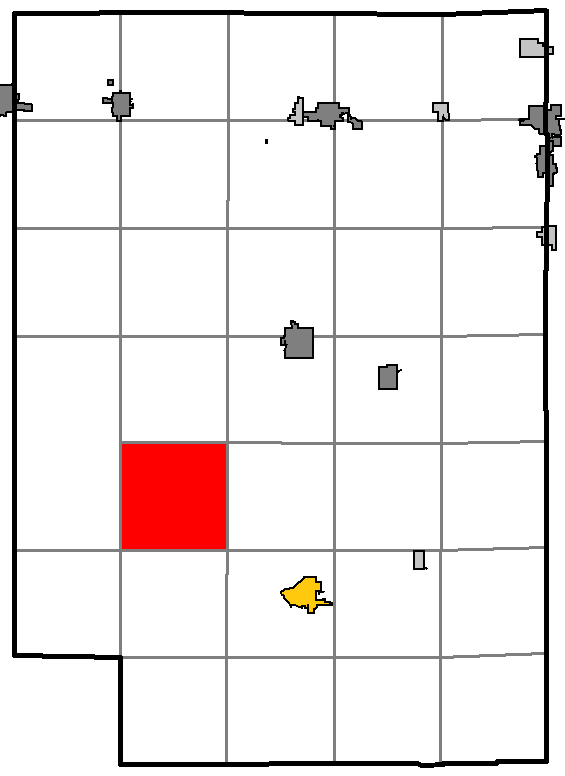
- Location of Seif, Clark County

- Location of Clark County, Wisconsin
- Coordinates: 44°38′52″N 90°44′15″W
- Country: United States
- State: Wisconsin
- County: Clark

Area
  - Total: 36.0 sq mi (93.3 km^{2})
  - Land: 36.0 sq mi (93.3 km^{2})
  - Water: 0 sq mi (0.0 km^{2})
- Elevation: 1,132 ft (345 m)

Population (2020)
  - Total: 188
  - Density: 5.22/sq mi (2.02/km^{2})
- Time zone: UTC-6 (Central (CST))
  - Summer (DST): UTC-5 (CDT)
- Area codes: 715 & 534
- FIPS code: 55-72450
- GNIS feature ID: 1584120

Seif is a town in Clark County in the U.S. state of Wisconsin. The population was 188 at the 2020 census.

== Geography ==
According to the United States Census Bureau, the town has a total area of 36.0 square miles (93.3 km^{2}), of which 36.0 square miles (93.3 km^{2}) is land and 0.04 square mile (0.1 km^{2}) (0.06%) is water.

== Demographics ==
As of the census of 2000, there were 212 people, 89 households, and 63 families residing in the town. The population density was 5.9 people per square mile (2.3/km^{2}). There were 122 housing units at an average density of 3.4 per square mile (1.3/km^{2}). The racial makeup of the town was 100.00% White.

There were 89 households, out of which 23.6% had children under the age of 18 living with them, 65.2% were married couples living together, 2.2% had a female householder with no husband present, and 29.2% were non-families. 28.1% of all households were made up of individuals, and 19.1% had someone living alone who was 65 years of age or older. The average household size was 2.38 and the average family size was 2.90.

In the town, the population was spread out, with 21.7% under the age of 18, 6.6% from 18 to 24, 24.5% from 25 to 44, 27.4% from 45 to 64, and 19.8% who were 65 years of age or older. The median age was 44 years. For every 100 females, there were 107.8 males. For every 100 females age 18 and over, there were 110.1 males.

The median income for a household in the town was $28,333, and the median income for a family was $32,500. Males had a median income of $25,313 versus $14,000 for females. The per capita income for the town was $13,743. About 11.1% of families and 14.5% of the population were below the poverty line, including 21.9% of those under the age of eighteen and 11.8% of those 65 or over.
