= Colby (town), Wisconsin =

Colby, Wisconsin
- Town
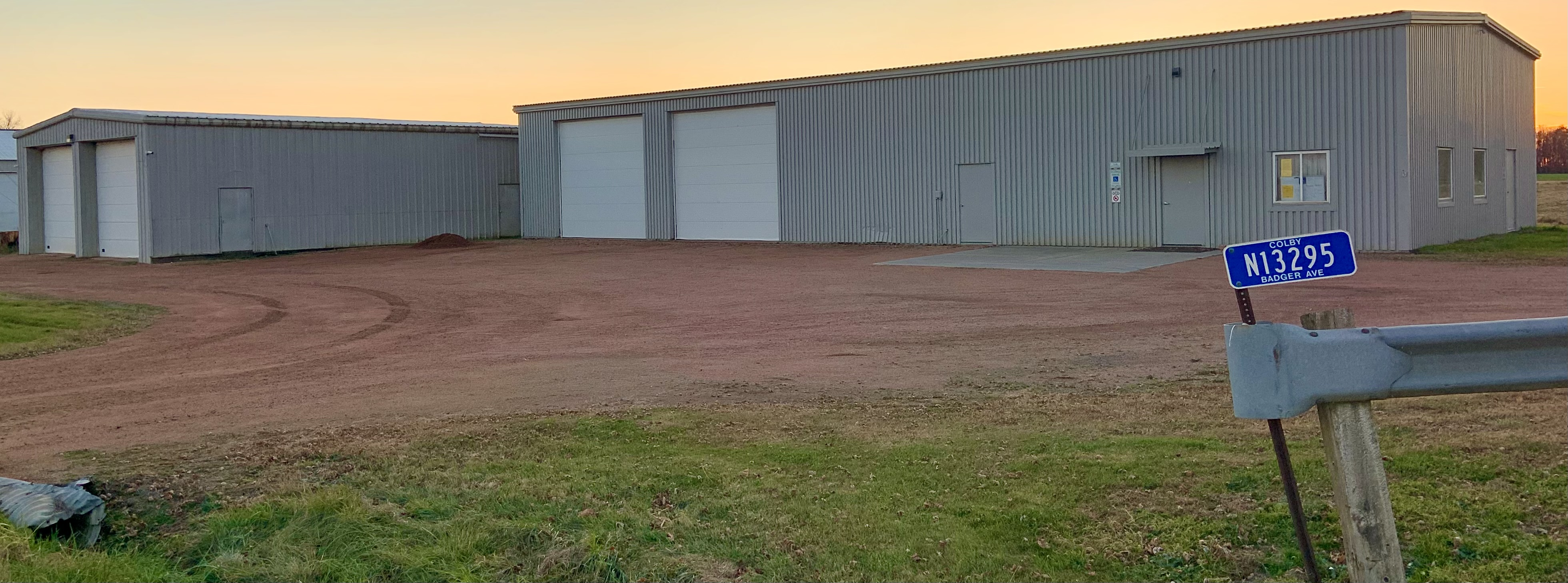
- Town hall

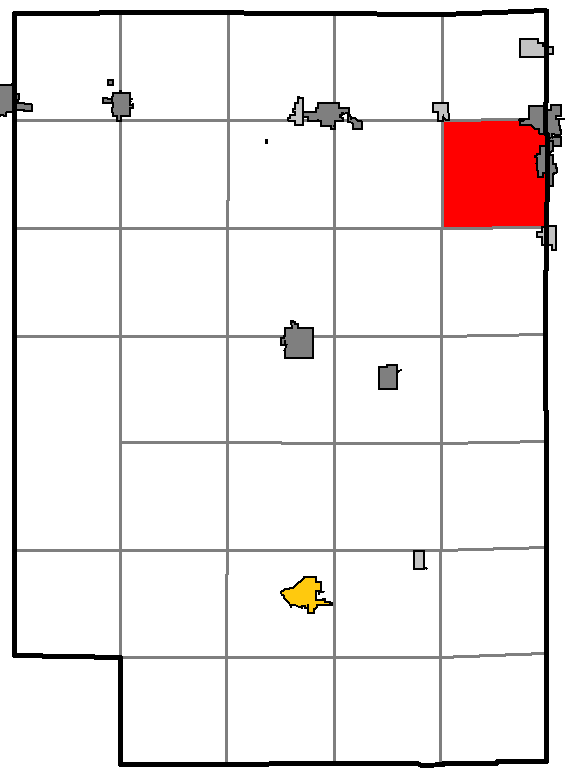
- Location within Clark County

- Location within the state of Wisconsin
- Coordinates: 44°54′7″N 90°22′28″W
- Country: United States
- State: Wisconsin
- County: Clark

Area
  - Total: 33.77 sq mi (87.46 km^{2})
  - Land: 33.75 sq mi (87.41 km^{2})
  - Water: 0.019 sq mi (0.05 km^{2})
- Elevation: 1,360 ft (410 m)

Population (2020)
  - Total: 922
  - Density: 27.3/sq mi (10.5/km^{2})
- Time zone: UTC-6 (Central (CST))
  - Summer (DST): UTC-5 (CDT)
- Area codes: 715 & 534
- FIPS code: 55-019-16175
- Website: https://www.townshipofcolby.com/

Colby is a town in Clark County in the U.S. state of Wisconsin. The population was 922 at the 2020 census.

== Geography ==
The town is located along the eastern border of Clark County, adjoining Marathon County. It is bordered to the east by the city of Colby and to the northeast by the city of Abbotsford.

According to the United States Census Bureau, the town of Colby has a total area of 33.8 square miles (87.5 km^{2}), of which 0.02 square miles (0.05 km^{2}), or 0.06%, is water.

== Demographics ==
As of the census of 2000, there were 908 people, 276 households, and 231 families residing in the town. The population density was 26.9 people per square mile (10.4/km^{2}). There were 281 housing units at an average density of 8.3 per square mile (3.2/km^{2}). The racial makeup of the town was 97.14% White, 0.44% Black or African American, 0.55% Native American, 0.55% Asian, 0.77% from other races, and 0.55% from two or more races. 0.99% of the population were Hispanic or Latino of any race.

There were 276 households, out of which 46.7% had children under the age of 18 living with them, 73.6% were married couples living together, 5.1% had a female householder with no husband present, and 16.3% were non-families. 14.5% of all households were made up of individuals, and 6.9% had someone living alone who was 65 years of age or older. The average household size was 3.29 and the average family size was 3.63.

In the town, the population was spread out, with 36.3% under the age of 18, 7.2% from 18 to 24, 27.3% from 25 to 44, 18.9% from 45 to 64, and 10.2% who were 65 years of age or older. The median age was 31 years. For every 100 females, there were 105.0 males. For every 100 females age 18 and over, there were 107.2 males.

The median income for a household in the town was $41,310, and the median income for a family was $43,333. Males had a median income of $27,250 versus $22,188 for females. The per capita income for the town was $13,591. About 9.7% of families and 16.3% of the population were below the poverty line, including 25.0% of those under age 18 and 2.8% of those age 65 or over.
