= Mead, Wisconsin =

- Town
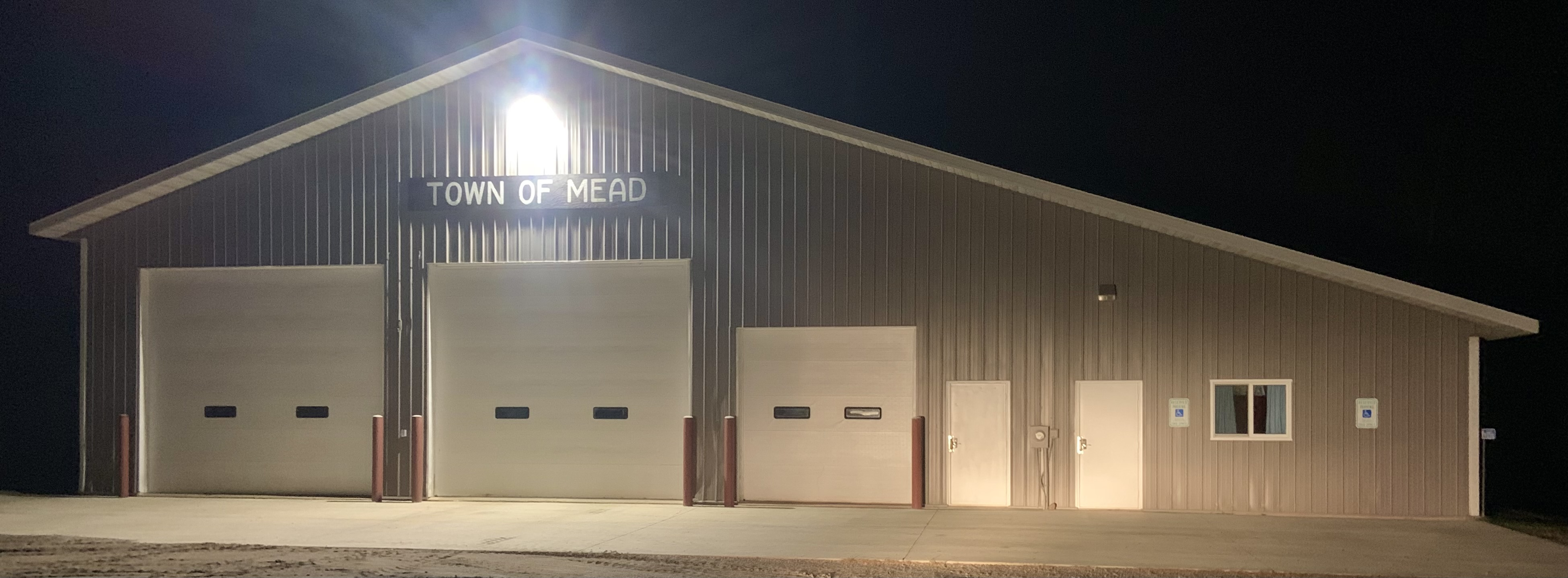
- Town hall

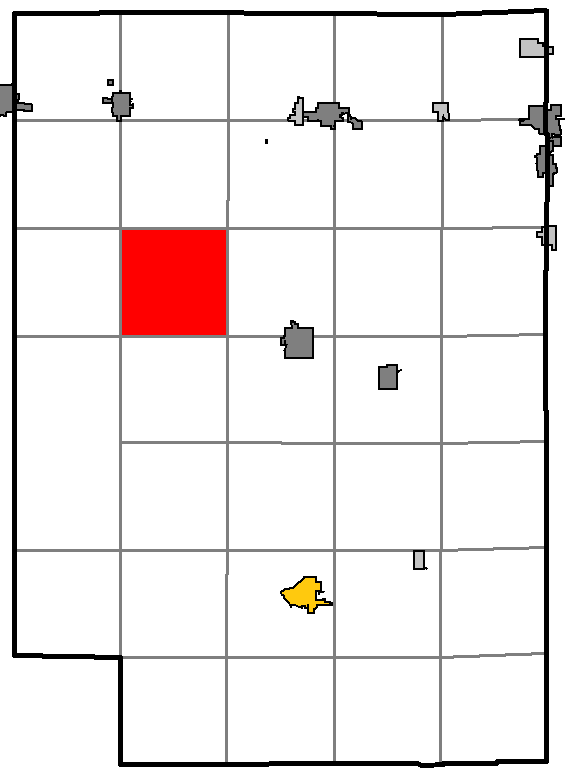
- Location of Mead, Clark County

- Location of Clark County, Wisconsin
- Coordinates: 44°47′46″N 90°44′2″W
- Country: United States
- State: Wisconsin
- County: Clark

Area
  - Total: 35.7 sq mi (92.4 km^{2})
  - Land: 35.1 sq mi (91.0 km^{2})
  - Water: 0.54 sq mi (1.4 km^{2})
- Elevation: 1,063 ft (324 m)

Population (2020)
  - Total: 357
  - Density: 10.2/sq mi (3.92/km^{2})
- Time zone: UTC-6 (Central (CST))
  - Summer (DST): UTC-5 (CDT)
- Area codes: 715 & 534
- FIPS code: 55-50275
- GNIS feature ID: 1583679

Mead is a town in Clark County in the U.S. state of Wisconsin. The population was 357 at the 2020 census.

== Geography ==
According to the United States Census Bureau, the town has a total area of 35.7 square miles (92.4 km^{2}), of which 35.1 square miles (91.0 km^{2}) is land and 0.5 square mile (1.4 km^{2}) (1.51%) is water.

== Demographics ==
As of the census of 2000, there were 290 people, 115 households, and 80 families residing in the town. The population density was 8.3 people per square mile (3.2/km^{2}). There were 239 housing units at an average density of 6.8 per square mile (2.6/km^{2}). The racial makeup of the town was 95.86% White, 1.72% Native American, and 2.41% from two or more races.

There were 115 households, out of which 26.1% had children under the age of 18 living with them, 57.4% were married couples living together, 5.2% had a female householder with no husband present, and 29.6% were non-families. 24.3% of all households were made up of individuals, and 7.8% had someone living alone who was 65 years of age or older. The average household size was 2.52 and the average family size was 3.04.

In the town, the population was spread out, with 27.2% under the age of 18, 4.8% from 18 to 24, 23.1% from 25 to 44, 30.0% from 45 to 64, and 14.8% who were 65 years of age or older. The median age was 39 years. For every 100 females, there were 116.4 males. For every 100 females age 18 and over, there were 119.8 males.

The median income for a household in the town was $31,875, and the median income for a family was $37,692. Males had a median income of $25,156 versus $16,250 for females. The per capita income for the town was $13,459. About 14.9% of families and 20.0% of the population were below the poverty line, including 38.0% of those under the age of eighteen and 11.5% of those 65 or over.
