= Trimbelle River =

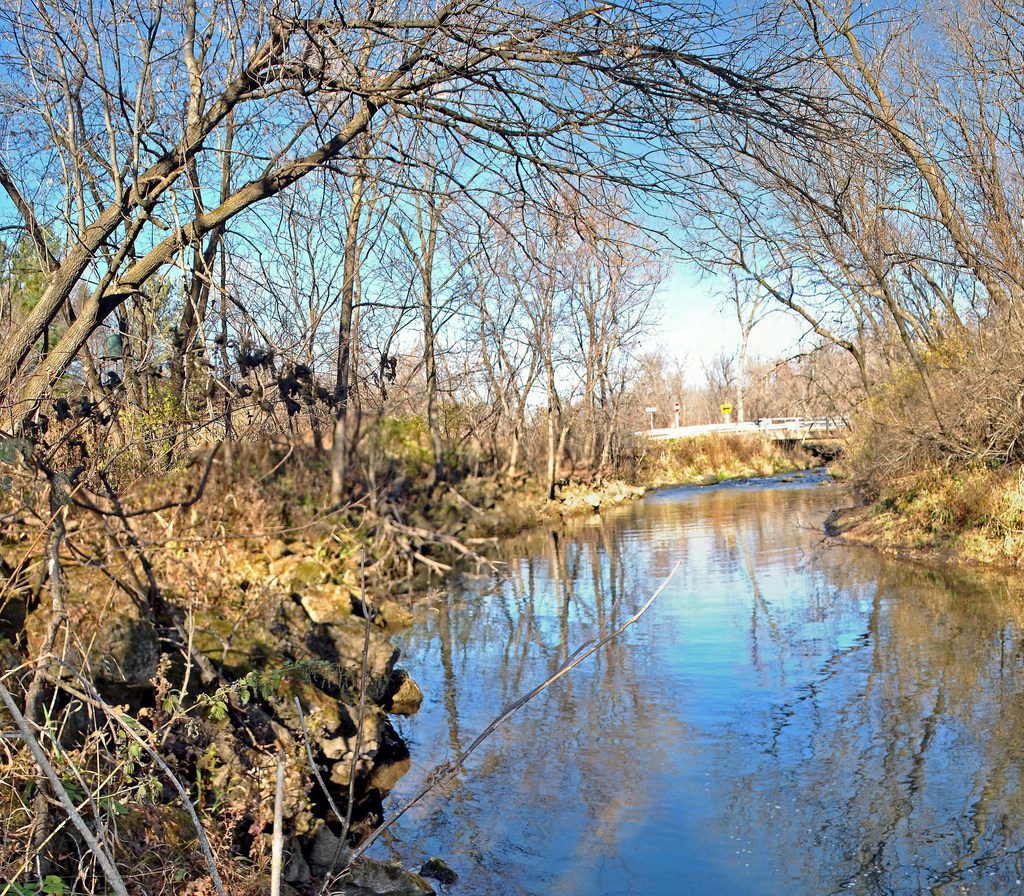
- Trimbelle River at Trimbelle

- Mouth of the Trimbelle River

Location
- Country: United States
- State: Wisconsin
- County: Pierce County, St. Croix County

Physical characteristics
- Source
  - location: Martell, Wisconsin
  - coordinates: 44.866078°N 92.4674141°W
- Mouth
  - location: west of Bay City, Wisconsin
  - coordinates: 44°36′14″N 92°34′03″W
- Length: 29.4 mi-long (47.3 km)

Basin features
- River system: Mississippi River

The Trimbelle River is a 29.4-mile-long (47.3 km) tributary of the Mississippi River in western Wisconsin in the United States. It flows for its entire length in western Pierce County, rising in the town of Martell and flowing generally southwardly through the towns of River Falls, Trimbelle, Trenton and Diamond Bluff. It flows into the Mississippi River about 5 miles (8 km) west of Bay City.

The Trembelle has been designated by the state of Wisconsin as a Class II trout stream for brown trout. Several sections of the Trimbelle have been restored by the local chapter (KIAPTUWISH) of Trout Unlimited.

== See also ==
- List of Wisconsin rivers
