= Harry Jonathan Park =

American businessman and politician

Harry Jonathan Park (December 24, 1868 – October 17, 1927) was an American businessman and politician.

Born in the town of Trimbelle, Pierce County, Wisconsin, Park moved to Cambridge, Massachusetts with family in 1872. In 1885, Park and his family moved back to Pierce County, Wisconsin. His father started an veneer mill in the town of Trenton in Pierce County. He operated an venner mill near Brasington, Wisconsin and a mill in Elmwood, Wisconsin. In 1898, Park moved to Spring Valley, Wisconsin. He was in the real estate, funeral and furniture business. Park served as village clerk and village president for Spring Valley, Wisconsin. He also served on the school board. Park served on the Pierce County, Wisconsin Board of Supervisors and was chairman of the county board. In 1901, Park served in the Wisconsin State Assembly as a Republican. Park died of pneumonia at his home in Spring Valley, Wisconsin.
