= Ono, Wisconsin =

- Unincorporated community
- Location within Wisconsin Location within the United States
- Coordinates: 44°39′20″N 92°15′23″W
- Country: United States
- State: Wisconsin
- County: Pierce
- Elevation: 1,145 ft (349 m)
- Time zone: UTC-6 (Central (CST))
  - Summer (DST): UTC-5 (CDT)
- Area codes: 715 & 534
- GNIS feature ID: 1581565

Ono (/ˈoʊnoʊ/ OH-noh) is an unincorporated community located in the towns of Salem and Union, Pierce County, Wisconsin, United States. Ono is located at the junction of U.S. Route 10 and County Highway CC, 3.5 miles (5.6 km) west-northwest of Plum City. Ono is also commonly called Grange Hall because it was the location of the meeting hall for the local chapter of The Grange. The community's oldest existing structure is the Ono United Methodist Church, which was built in 1862.

== Frac Sand ==
Ono's largest employer is Muskie-Proppant which operates a large frac sand processing plant in the community.
