= Lloyd Tombleson =

American educator, farmer and politician

Lloyd Tombleson (June 19, 1883 – September 9, 1951) was an American educator, farmer and politician.

Born in the town of Trimbelle, Pierce County, Wisconsin, Tombleson graduated from River Falls Teachers College in 1906. He then taught school and was principal. Tombleson also was a farmer and raised turkeys. Tombleson served on the Pierce County Board of Supervisors and was chairman of the county board. He also served as chairman of the Salem Town Board and was a Republican. Tombleson served on the school board and the county school committee. In 1933, Tombleson served in the Wisconsin State Assembly. He died in a hospital in Plum City, Wisconsin after a long illness.
