= Hartland, Wisconsin (disambiguation) =

Hartland is the name of some places in the U.S. state of Wisconsin:

- Hartland, Wisconsin, a village in Waukesha County
- Hartland, Pierce County, Wisconsin, a town
- Hartland, Shawano County, Wisconsin, a town
