= Tombleson =

Tombleson is a surname. Notable people with the surname include:

- Esme Tombleson (1917–2010), New Zealand politician
- Lloyd Tombleson (1883–1951), American educator, farmer, and politician
- William Tombleson (1795–c. 1846), English artist
