= Theodore Swanson =

American farmer and politician

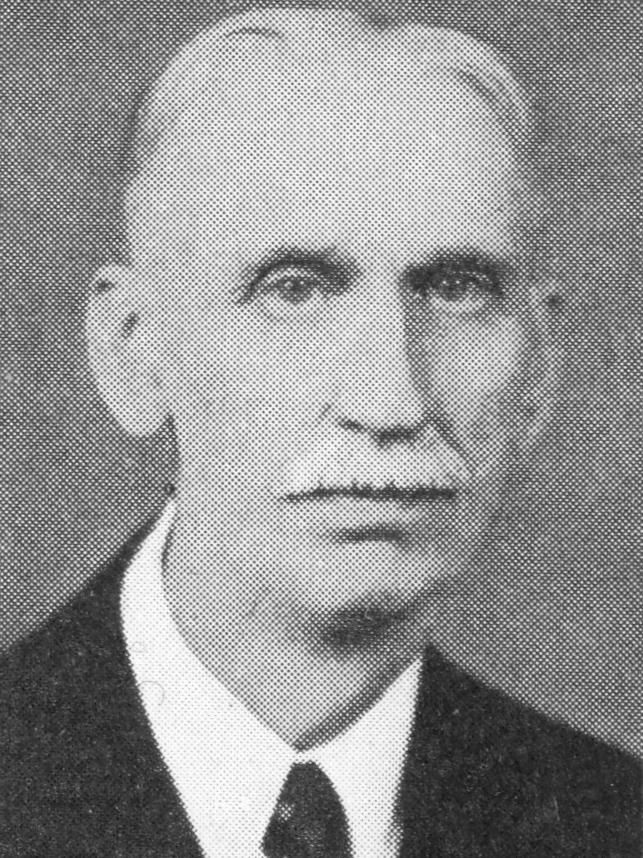
Swanson circa 1940

Theodore Swanson (October 8, 1873 – April 2, 1959) was an American farmer and politician.

Born in Red Wing, Minnesota, he moved with his family to a farm in the town of Hartland in Pierce County, Wisconsin. He served in town government, the school district, and was on the Pierce County Board of Supervisors. He was involved with a farmers bank, creamery, and grain business; and took an active part in the American Society of Equity and other social welfare organizations.. Swanson served in the Wisconsin State Assembly as a member of the Wisconsin Progressive Party from 1925 to 1929 and then from 1935 to 1941. He died in Red Wing, Minnesota.

He was married to Edith May Weghorn.
