= Moeville, Wisconsin =

- Unincorporated community
- Location within Wisconsin Location within the United States
- Coordinates: 44°41′19″N 92°31′39″W
- Country: United States
- State: Wisconsin
- County: Pierce
- Elevation: 988 ft (301 m)
- Time zone: UTC-6 (Central (CST))
  - Summer (DST): UTC-5 (CDT)
- Area codes: 715 & 534
- GNIS feature ID: 1569634

Moeville is an unincorporated community located in the towns of Trenton and Trimbelle, in Pierce County, Wisconsin, United States.
