= Ottman Corners, Wisconsin =

- Unincorporated community
- Location within Wisconsin Location within the United States
- Coordinates: 44°42′12″N 92°31′02″W
- Country: United States
- State: Wisconsin
- County: Pierce
- Elevation: 1,024 ft (312 m)
- Time zone: UTC-6 (Central (CST))
  - Summer (DST): UTC-5 (CDT)
- Area codes: 715 & 534
- GNIS feature ID: 1570922

Ottman Corners is an unincorporated community located in the town of Trimbelle, Pierce County, Wisconsin, United States.

It was named for three brothers: Nelson, Christopher, and James Ottman who came from New York in 1859.
