= Oak Grove, Pierce County, Wisconsin =

Oak Grove, Wisconsin
- Town
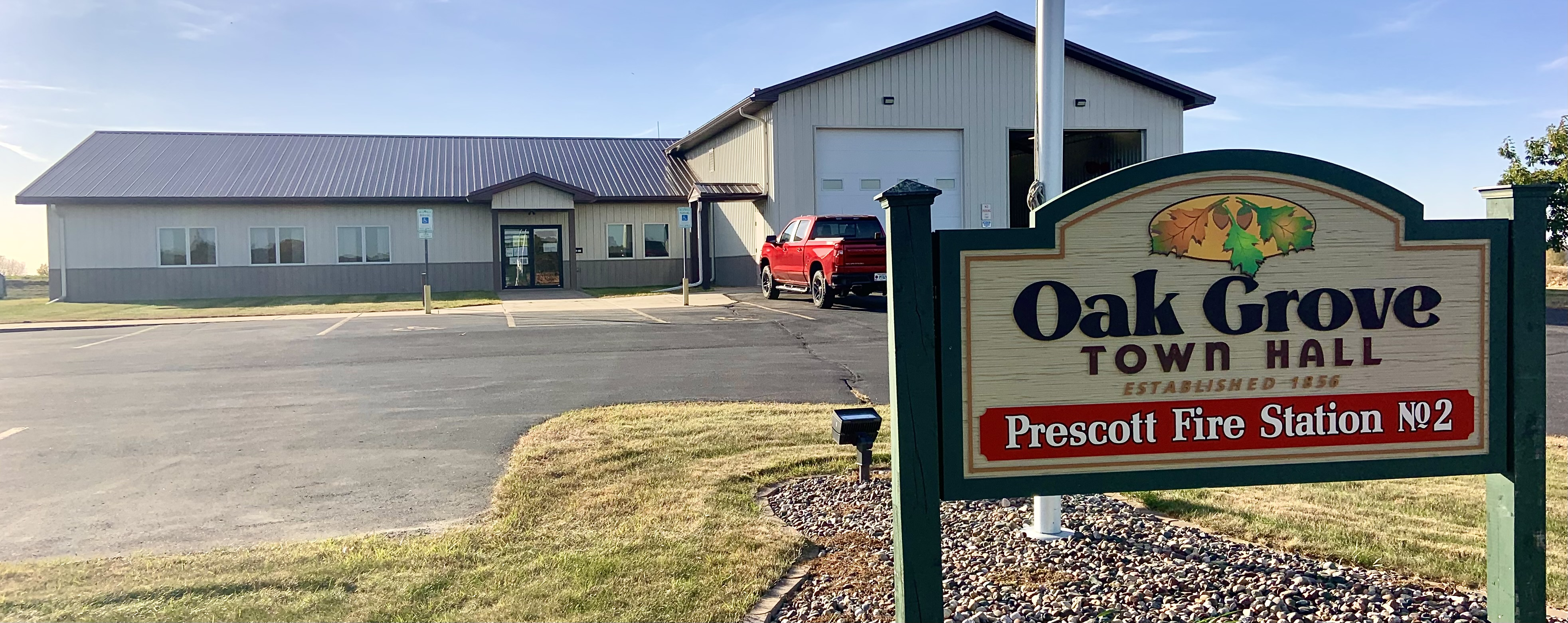
- Town hall

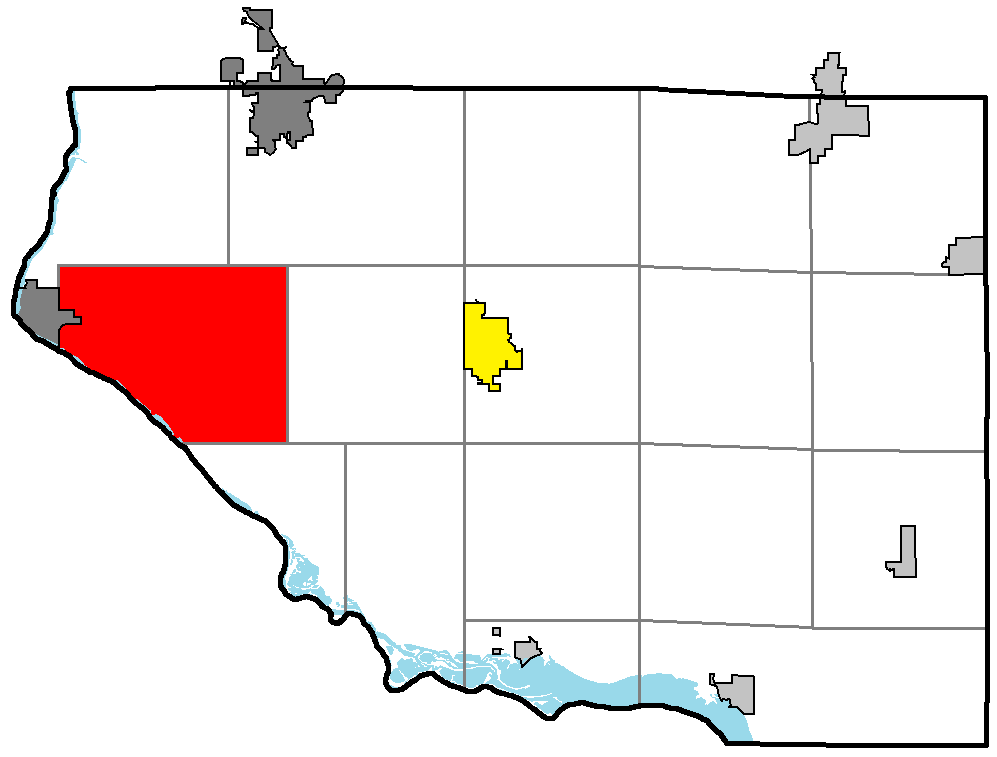
- Location of Oak Grove, within Pierce County

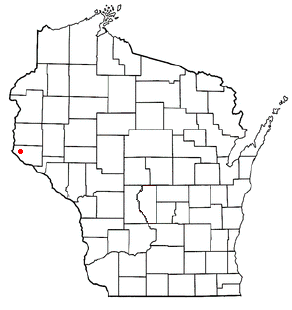
- Location of Oak Grove, Wisconsin
- Coordinates: 44°44′53″N 92°41′25″W
- Country: United States
- State: Wisconsin
- County: Pierce

Area
  - Total: 39.8 sq mi (103.1 km^{2})
  - Land: 39.3 sq mi (101.7 km^{2})
  - Water: 0.54 sq mi (1.4 km^{2})
- Elevation: 1,024 ft (312 m)

Population (2020)
  - Total: 2,361
  - Density: 60.13/sq mi (23.22/km^{2})
- Time zone: UTC-6 (Central (CST))
  - Summer (DST): UTC-5 (CDT)
- Area codes: 715 & 534
- FIPS code: 55-59025
- GNIS feature ID: 1583842

Oak Grove is a town in Pierce County, Wisconsin, United States. The population was 2,361 at the 2020 census. The unincorporated community of Smith Landing is located in this town.

== Geography ==
According to the United States Census Bureau, the town has a total area of 39.8 square miles (103.1 km^{2}), of which 39.3 square miles (101.7 km^{2}) is land and 0.5 square miles (1.4 km^{2}) (1.33%) is water.

== Demographics ==
As of the census of 2010, there were 2,150 people, 722 households, and 610 families residing in the town. The population density was 54.7 inhabitants per square mile (21.1/km^{2}). There were 761 housing units at an average density of 19.4 per square mile (7.5/km^{2}). The racial makeup of the town was 97.72% White, 0.14% African American, 0.19% Native American, 0.60% Asian, 0.60% from other races, and 0.74% from two or more races. Hispanic or Latino of any race were 1.63% of the population.

There were 722 households, out of which 39.5% had children under the age of 18 living with them, 77.1% were married couples living together, 3.3% had a female householder with no husband present, and 15.5% were non-families. 11.1% of all households were made up of individuals, and 3.0% had someone living alone who was 65 years of age or older. The average household size was 2.98 and the average family size was 3.23.

In the town, the population was spread out, with 29.9% under the age of 18, 5.0% from 18 to 24, 25.4% from 25 to 44, 32.0% from 45 to 64, and 7.7% who were 65 years of age or older. The median age was 39.6 years. For every 100 females, there were 108.5 males. For every 100 females age 18 and over, there were 107.3 males.

The median income for a household in the town was $91,859, and the median income for a family was $94,625. Males had a median income of $57,132 versus $44,674 for females. The per capita income for the town was $35,374. About 1.9% of families and 2.4% of the population were below the poverty line, including 4.4% of those under age 18 and 0.0% of those age 65 or over.

== Notable people ==
- Solanus Casey, Roman Catholic priest, and who was beatified by Pope Francis, was born on a farm near Oak Grove
