= Union, Pierce County, Wisconsin =

Union, Wisconsin
- Town
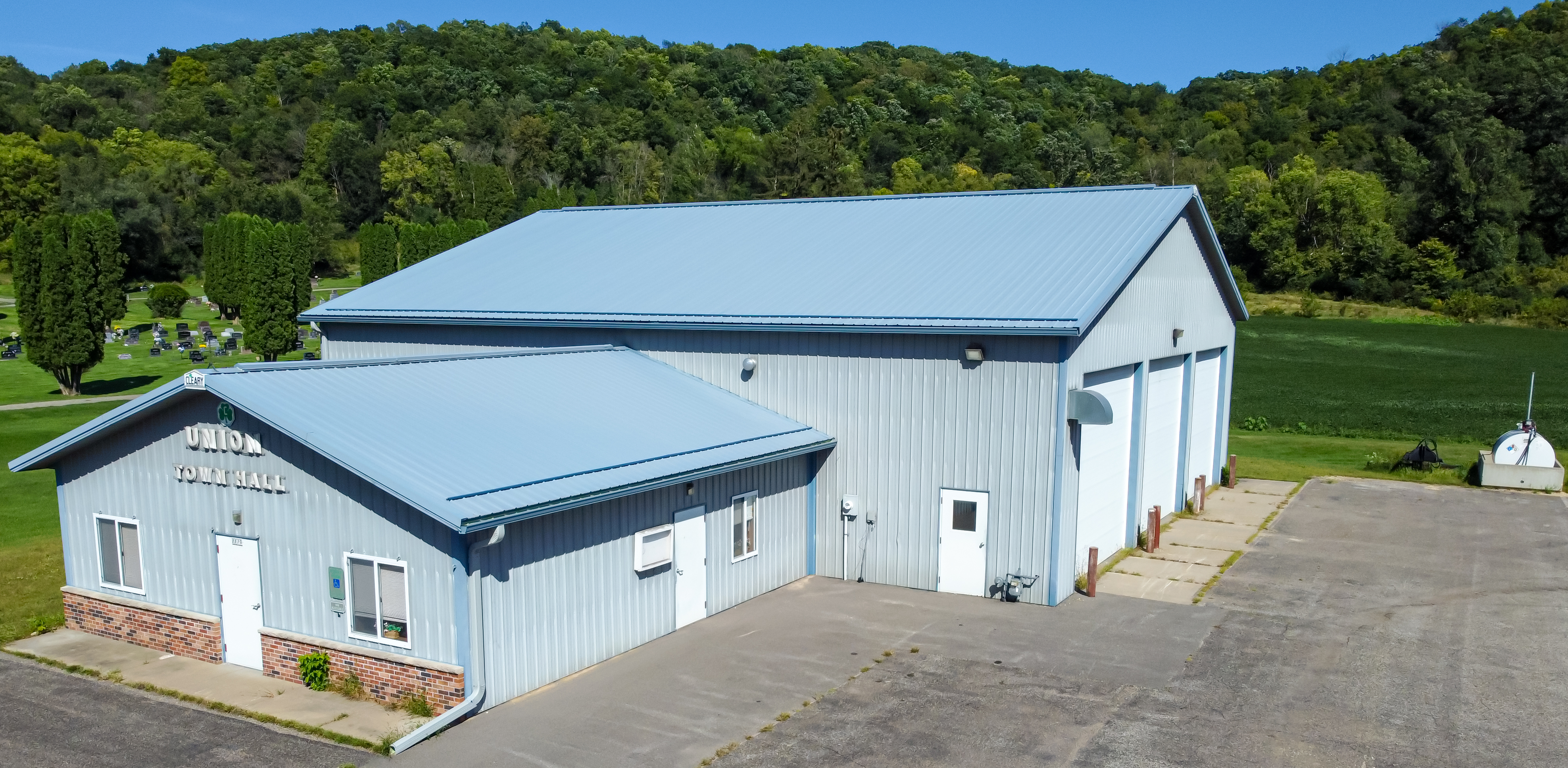
- Town hall

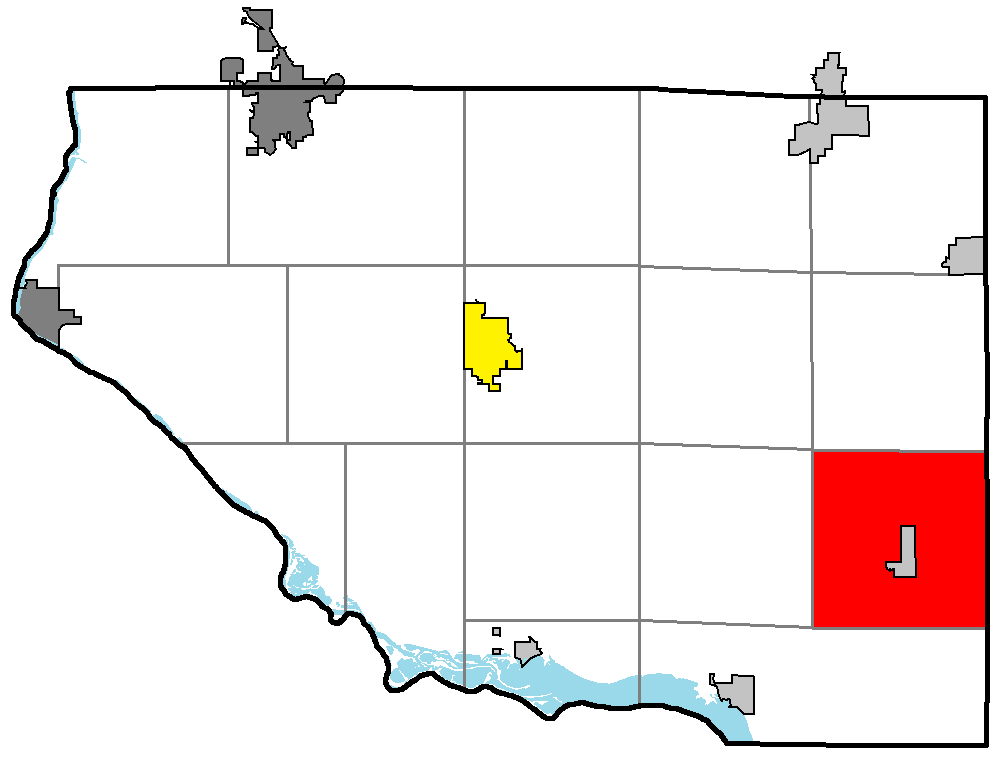
- Location of Union, within Pierce County

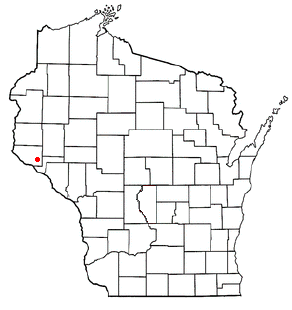
- Location of Union, Wisconsin
- Coordinates: 44°39′13″N 92°11′19″W
- Country: United States
- State: Wisconsin
- County: Pierce

Area
  - Total: 35.1 sq mi (90.9 km^{2})
  - Land: 34.9 sq mi (90.4 km^{2})
  - Water: 0.19 sq mi (0.5 km^{2})
- Elevation: 1,106 ft (337 m)

Population (2020)
  - Total: 602
  - Density: 17.2/sq mi (6.66/km^{2})
- Time zone: UTC-6 (Central (CST))
  - Summer (DST): UTC-5 (CDT)
- Area codes: 715 & 534
- FIPS code: 55-81600
- GNIS feature ID: 1584312

Union is a town in Pierce County, Wisconsin, United States. The population was 602 at the 2020 census. The unincorporated community of Ono is located partially in the town.

== Geography ==
According to the United States Census Bureau, the town has a total area of 35.1 square miles (90.9 km^{2}), of which 34.9 square miles (90.4 km^{2}) is land and 0.2 square mile (0.5 km^{2}) (0.51%) is water.

== Demographics ==
As of the census of 2000, there were 618 people, 212 households, and 168 families residing in the town. The population density was 17.7 inhabitants per square mile (6.8/km^{2}). There were 215 housing units at an average density of 6.2 per square mile (2.4/km^{2}). The racial makeup of the town was 99.51% White, and 0.49% from two or more races.

There were 212 households, out of which 40.6% had children under the age of 18 living with them, 67.0% were married couples living together, 4.7% had a female householder with no husband present, and 20.3% were non-families. 17.0% of all households were made up of individuals, and 5.7% had someone living alone who was 65 years of age or older. The average household size was 2.92 and the average family size was 3.30.

In the town, the population was spread out, with 30.1% under the age of 18, 7.1% from 18 to 24, 27.7% from 25 to 44, 24.6% from 45 to 64, and 10.5% who were 65 years of age or older. The median age was 37 years. For every 100 females, there were 116.8 males. For every 100 females age 18 and over, there were 117.1 males.

The median income for a household in the town was $35,375, and the median income for a family was $38,125. Males had a median income of $25,441 versus $24,583 for females. The per capita income for the town was $14,892. About 8.9% of families and 9.9% of the population were below the poverty line, including 10.3% of those under age 18 and 8.5% of those age 65 or over.
