= Isabelle, Wisconsin =

- Town
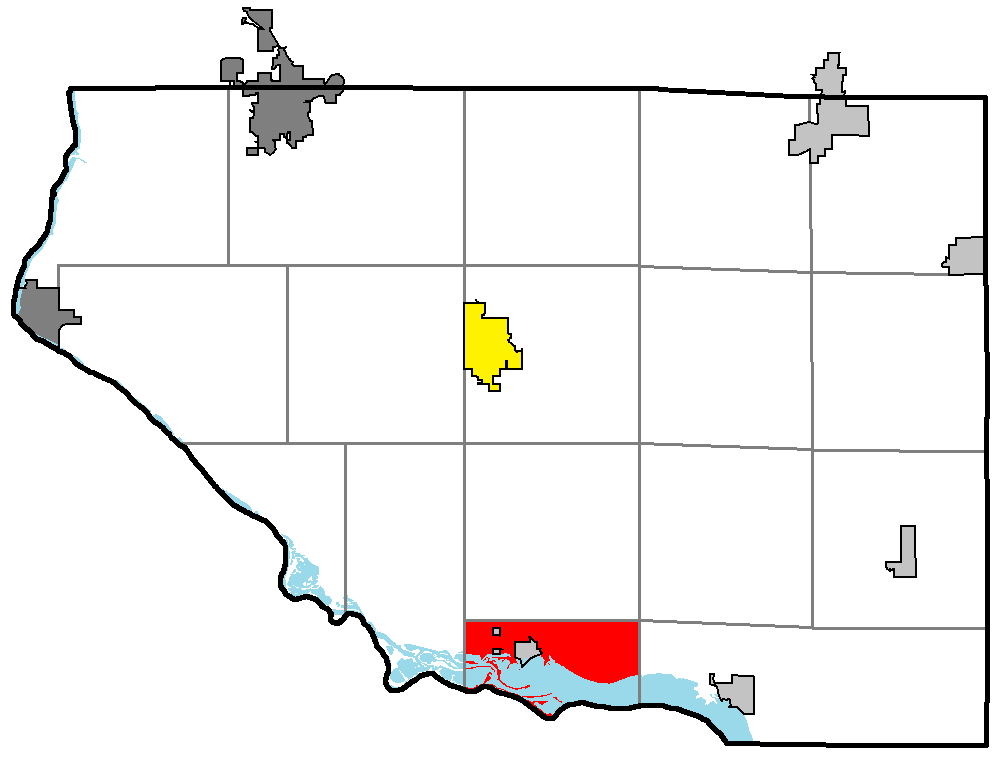
- Location of Isabelle, within Pierce County

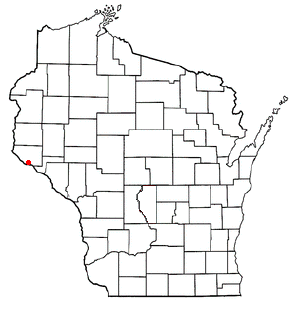
- Location of Isabelle, Wisconsin
- Coordinates: 44°35′40″N 92°27′3″W
- Country: United States
- State: Wisconsin
- County: Pierce

Area
  - Total: 15.6 sq mi (40.5 km^{2})
  - Land: 10.4 sq mi (27.0 km^{2})
  - Water: 5.3 sq mi (13.6 km^{2})
- Elevation: 679 ft (207 m)

Population (2020)
  - Total: 261
  - Density: 25.0/sq mi (9.67/km^{2})
- Time zone: UTC-6 (Central (CST))
  - Summer (DST): UTC-5 (CDT)
- Area codes: 715 & 534
- FIPS code: 55-37350
- GNIS feature ID: 1583438

Isabelle is a town in Pierce County, Wisconsin, United States. The population was 261 at the 2020 census. The unincorporated community of Oakridge is located in the town.

== Geography ==
According to the United States Census Bureau, the town has a total area of 15.6 square miles (40.5 km^{2}), of which 10.4 square miles (27.0 km^{2}) is land and 5.2 square miles (13.6 km^{2}) (33.48%) is water.

== Demographics ==
As of the census of 2000, there were 315 people, 113 households, and 88 families residing in the town. The population density was 30.2 inhabitants per square mile (11.7/km^{2}). There were 118 housing units at an average density of 11.3 per square mile (4.4/km^{2}). The racial makeup of the town was 99.05% White, 0.32% African American and 0.63% Native American. Hispanic or Latino of any race were 1.59% of the population.

There were 113 households, out of which 42.5% had children under the age of 18 living with them, 61.9% were married couples living together, 9.7% had a female householder with no husband present, and 22.1% were non-families. 15.9% of all households were made up of individuals, and 2.7% had someone living alone who was 65 years of age or older. The average household size was 2.79 and the average family size was 3.06.

In the town, the population was spread out, with 27.3% under the age of 18, 5.1% from 18 to 24, 36.2% from 25 to 44, 24.1% from 45 to 64, and 7.3% who were 65 years of age or older. The median age was 35 years. For every 100 females, there were 115.8 males. For every 100 females age 18 and over, there were 110.1 males.

The median income for a household in the town was $52,188, and the median income for a family was $63,125. Males had a median income of $37,212 versus $26,875 for females. The per capita income for the town was $22,626. None of the families and 2.5% of the population were living below the poverty line, including no under eighteens and none of those over 64.
