= Maiden Rock, Wisconsin =

- Village
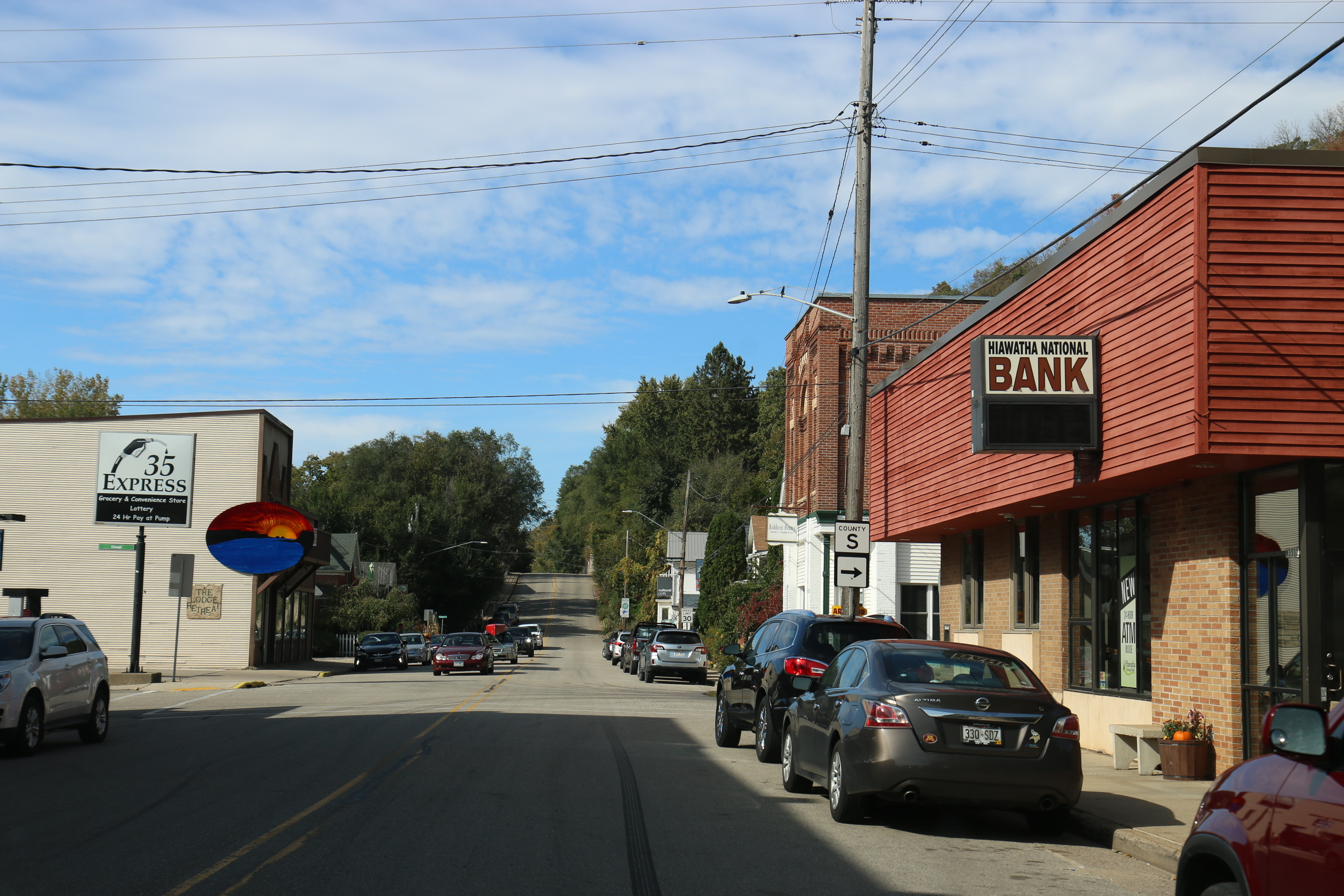
- Downtown Maiden Rock

- Location of Maiden Rock in Pierce County, Wisconsin.
- Coordinates: 44°34′16″N 92°14′37″W
- Country: United States
- State: Wisconsin
- County: Pierce

Area
  - Total: 1.21 sq mi (3.13 km^{2})
  - Land: 1.20 sq mi (3.12 km^{2})
  - Water: 0.0039 sq mi (0.01 km^{2})
- Elevation: 1,135 ft (346 m)

Population (2020)
  - Total: 115
  - Density: 95.5/sq mi (36.9/km^{2})
- Time zone: UTC-6 (Central (CST))
  - Summer (DST): UTC-5 (CDT)
- Area codes: 715 & 534
- FIPS code: 55-48200
- GNIS feature ID: 1568900
- Website: www.co.pierce.wi.us/government/municipal_government/village/maiden_rock.php/

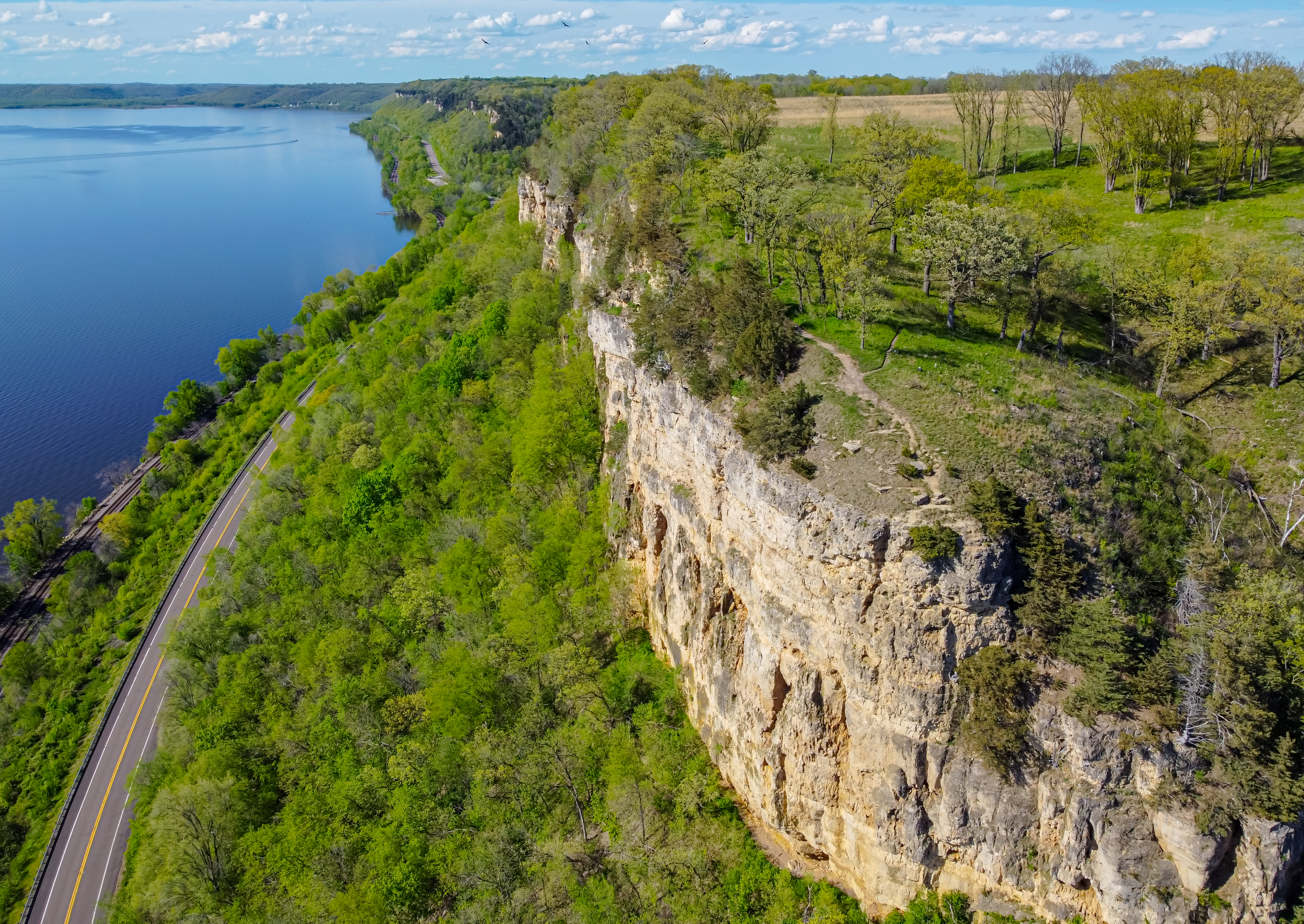
Maiden Rock

Maiden Rock is a village in Pierce County, Wisconsin, United States. The population was 115 at the 2020 census. The village is located within the Town of Maiden Rock.

== History ==
The town is named for a cliff (also called "Maiden Rock") just south of the village. In the Winona legend, the daughter of Dakota Sioux chief Red Wing (for whom the nearby town of Red Wing, Minnesota is named) jumped from this cliff after her lover, a member of the rival Chippewa tribe, was killed by Dakota warriors under orders from Red Wing. A plaque still stands near the base of the cliff, memorializing the village's namesake.

== Geography ==
Maiden Rock is located at 44°33′40″N 92°18′34″W (44.561295, -92.309563).

According to the United States Census Bureau, the village has a total area of 1.18 square miles (3.06 km^{2}), of which 1.17 square miles (3.03 km^{2}) is land and 0.01 square miles (0.03 km^{2}) is water.

== Demographics ==
Historical population
Census	Pop.	Note	%±
1880	319		—
1890	343		7.5%
1900	304		−11.4%
1910	337		10.9%
1920	293		−13.1%
1930	311		6.1%
1940	291		−6.4%
1950	269		−7.6%
1960	189		−29.7%
1970	172		−9.0%
1980	172		0.0%
1990	146		−15.1%
2000	121		−17.1%
2010	119		−1.7%
2020	115		−3.4%
U.S. Decennial Census

=== 2010 census ===
As of the census of 2010, there were 119 people, 50 households, and 31 families residing in the village. The population density was 101.7 inhabitants per square mile (39.3/km^{2}). There were 81 housing units at an average density of 69.2 per square mile (26.7/km^{2}). The racial makeup of the village was 96.6% White, 0.8% Asian, and 2.5% from two or more races. Hispanic or Latino of any race were 0.8% of the population.

There were 50 households, of which 34.0% had children under the age of 18 living with them, 46.0% were married couples living together, 8.0% had a female householder with no husband present, 8.0% had a male householder with no wife present, and 38.0% were non-families. 28.0% of all households were made up of individuals, and 12% had someone living alone who was 65 years of age or older. The average household size was 2.38 and the average family size was 2.81.

The median age in the village was 40.4 years. 24.4% of residents were under the age of 18; 7.6% were between the ages of 18 and 24; 25.1% were from 25 to 44; 36.2% were from 45 to 64; and 6.7% were 65 years of age or older. The gender makeup of the village was 49.6% male and 50.4% female.

=== 2000 census ===
As of the census of 2000, there were 121 people, 54 households, and 30 families residing in the village. The population density was 107.4 inhabitants per square mile (41.5/km^{2}). There were 79 housing units at an average density of 70.1 per square mile (27.1/km^{2}). The racial makeup of the village was 99.17% White and 0.83% Native American. 0.83% of the population were Hispanic or Latino of any race.

There were 54 households, out of which 24.1% had children under the age of 18 living with them, 31.5% were married couples living together, 16.7% had a female householder with no husband present, and 44.4% were non-families. 29.6% of all households were made up of individuals, and 5.6% had someone living alone who was 65 years of age or older. The average household size was 2.24 and the average family size was 2.77.

In the village, the population was spread out, with 24.8% under the age of 18, 9.1% from 18 to 24, 28.9% from 25 to 44, 25.6% from 45 to 64, and 11.6% who were 65 years of age or older. The median age was 38 years. For every 100 females, there were 105.1 males. For every 100 females age 18 and over, there were 85.7 males.

The median income for a household in the village was $40,625, and the median income for a family was $55,000. Males had a median income of $31,250 versus $28,750 for females. The per capita income for the village was $22,781. 2.3% of the population lived below the poverty line, including no families, no one under eighteen or over 64.

== Images ==
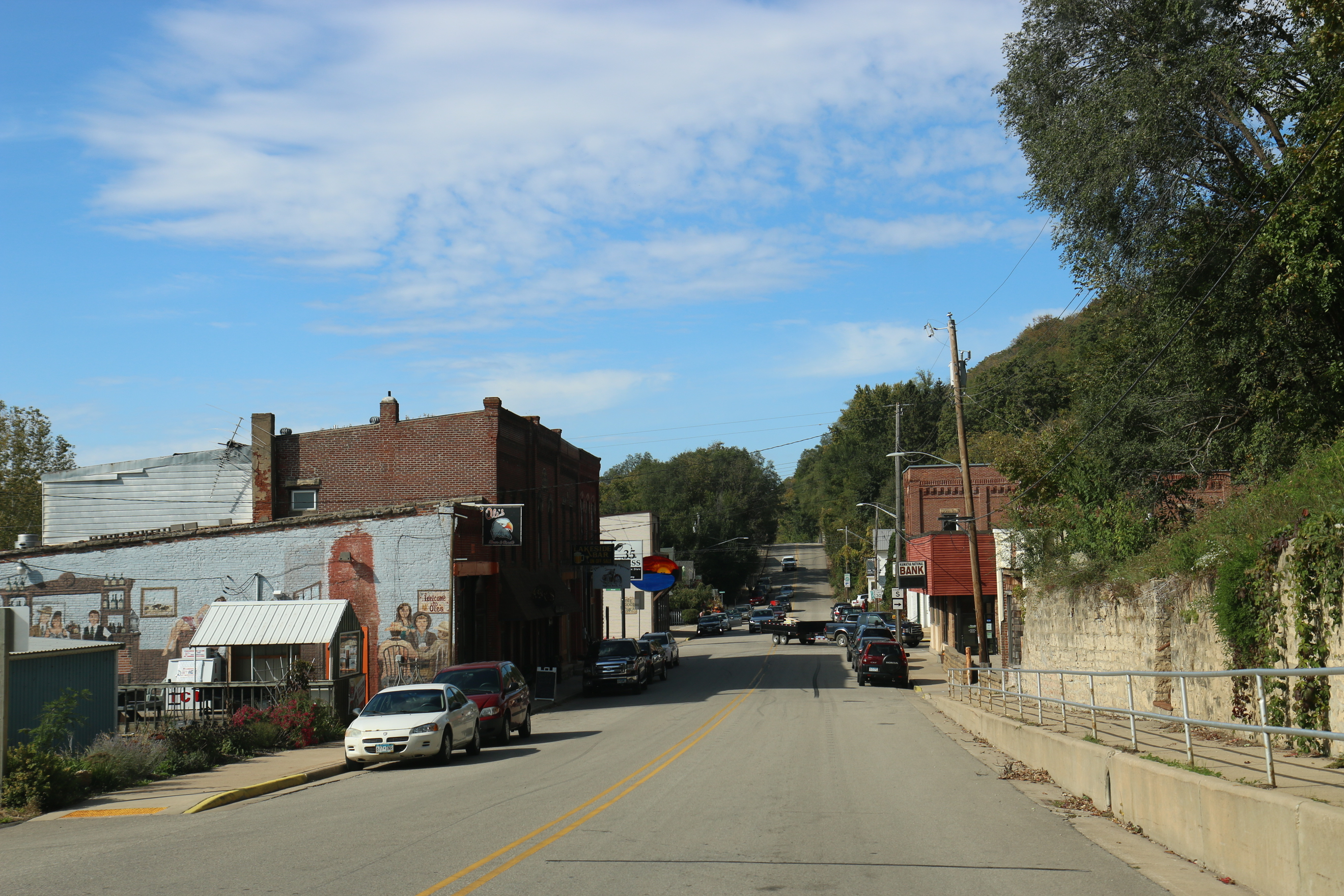
Downtown Maiden Rock

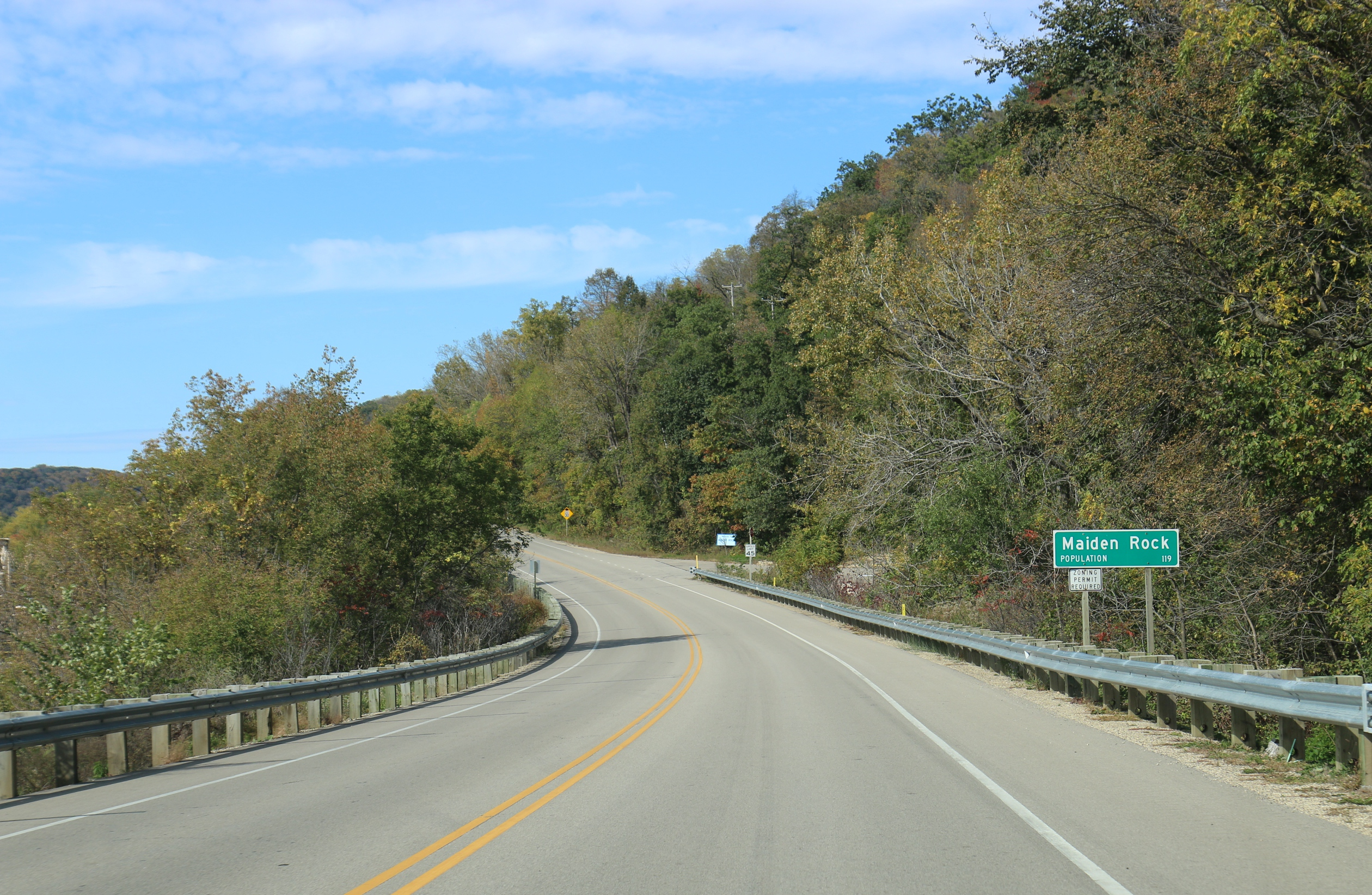
The sign for Maiden Rock

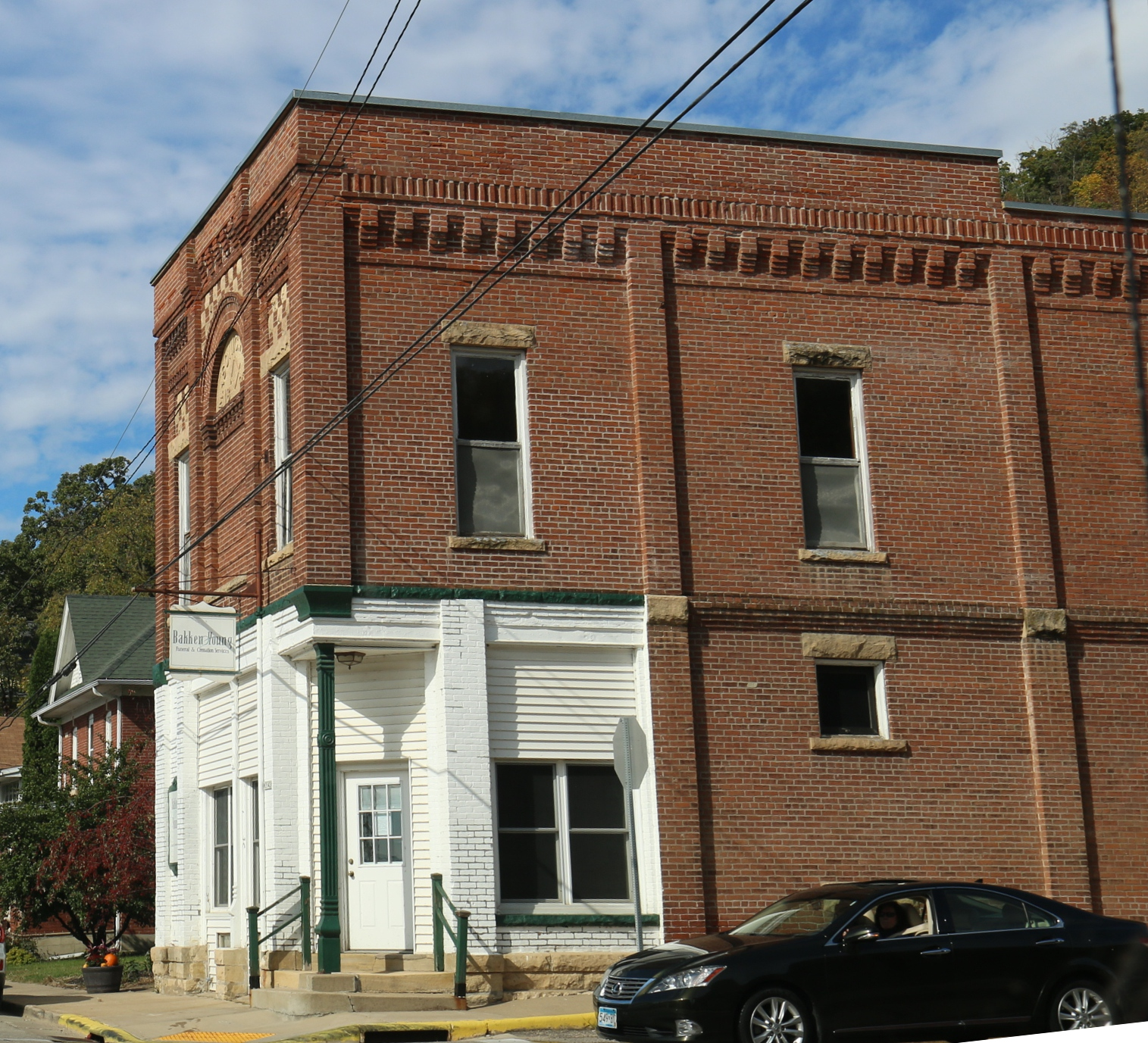
Masonic building

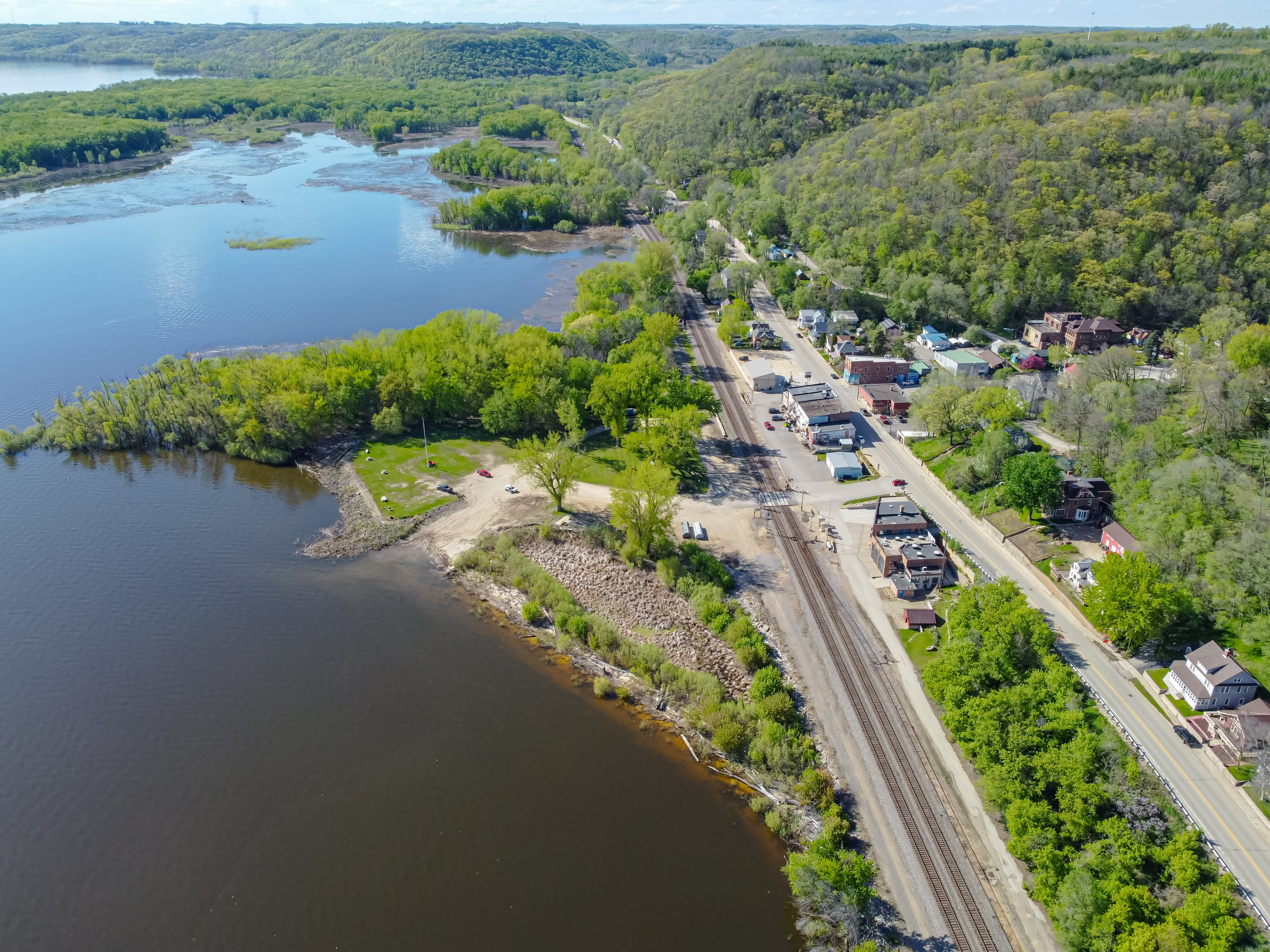
Wis-35 and the BNSF Railway run through town
