= Salem, Pierce County, Wisconsin =

Salem, Wisconsin
- Town
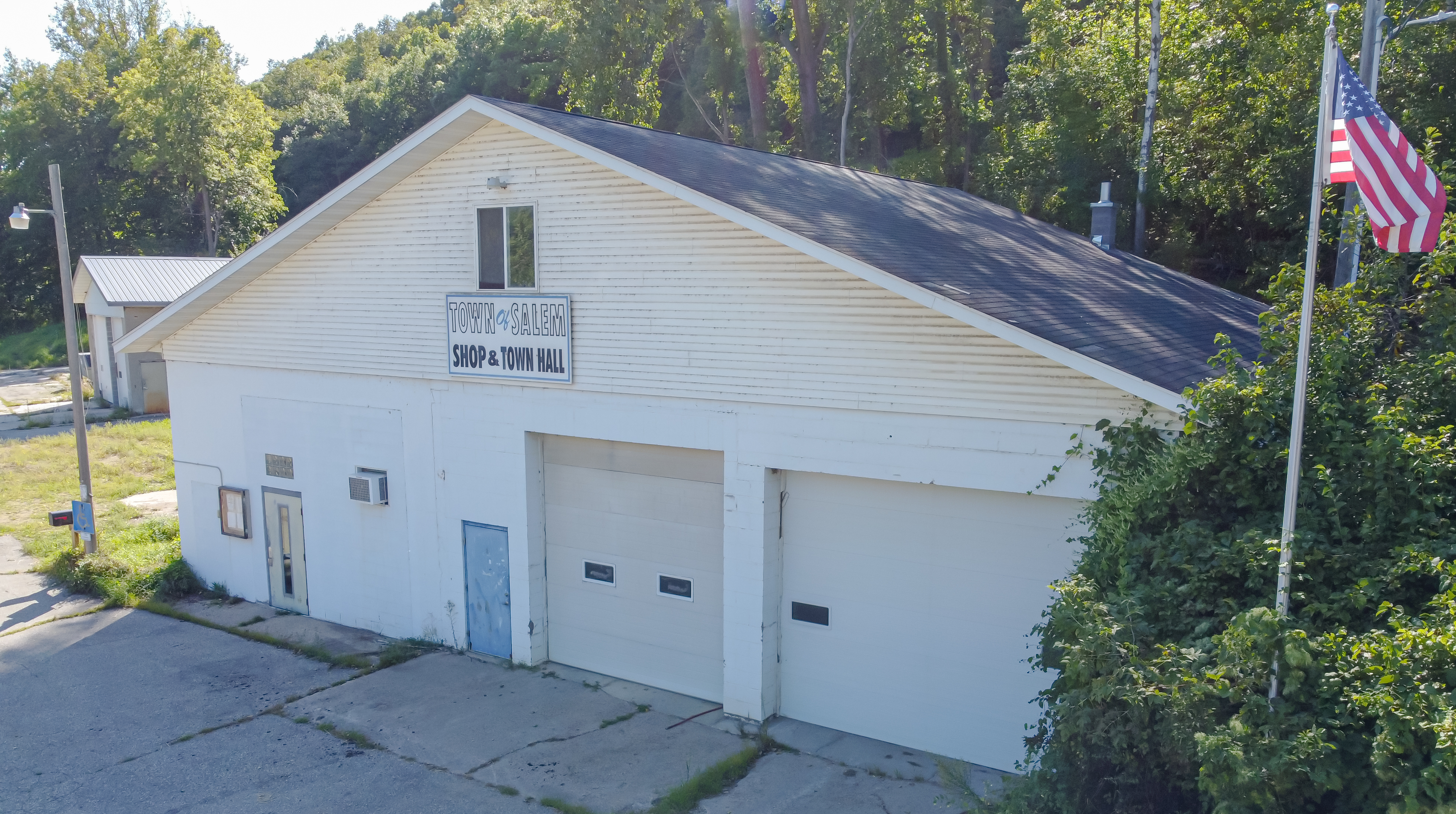
- Town hall

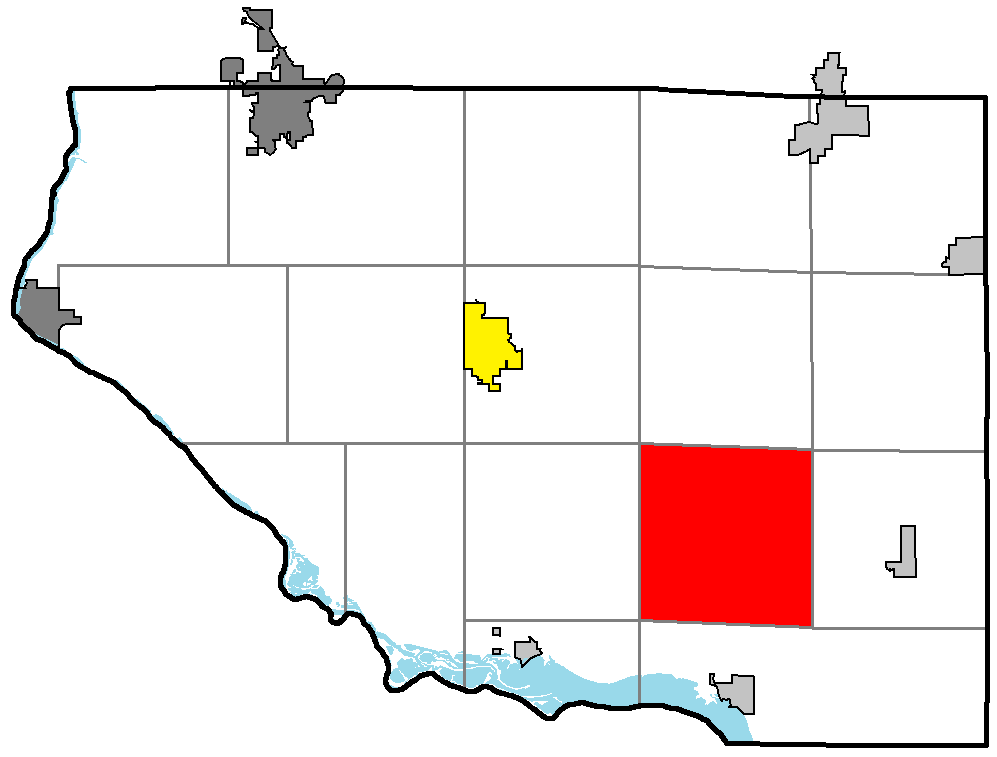
- Location of Salem, within Pierce County

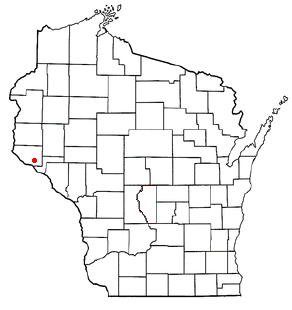
- Location of Salem, Wisconsin
- Coordinates: 44°38′55″N 92°19′33″W
- Country: United States
- State: Wisconsin
- County: Pierce

Area
  - Total: 35.4 sq mi (91.6 km^{2})
  - Land: 35.4 sq mi (91.6 km^{2})
  - Water: 0 sq mi (0.0 km^{2})
- Elevation: 1,076 ft (328 m)

Population (2020)
  - Total: 475
  - Density: 14/sq mi (5.5/km^{2})
- Time zone: UTC-6 (Central (CST))
  - Summer (DST): UTC-5 (CDT)
- Area codes: 715 & 534
- FIPS code: 55-71150
- GNIS feature ID: 1584094

Salem is a town in Pierce County, Wisconsin, United States. The population was 475 at the 2020 census. The unincorporated community of Ono is also located partially in the town.

== Geography ==
According to the United States Census Bureau, the town has a total area of 35.4 square miles (91.6 km^{2}), all land.

== Demographics ==
As of the census of 2000, there were 505 people, 173 households, and 146 families residing in the town. The population density was 14.3 inhabitants per square mile (5.5/km^{2}). There were 186 housing units at an average density of 5.3 per square mile (2.0/km^{2}). The racial makeup of the town was 99.80% White, and 0.20% from two or more races. Hispanic or Latino of any race were 0.79% of the population.

There were 173 households, out of which 38.2% had children under the age of 18 living with them, 74.0% were married couples living together, 3.5% had a female householder with no husband present, and 15.6% were non-families. 11.6% of all households were made up of individuals, and 1.7% had someone living alone who was 65 years of age or older. The average household size was 2.92 and the average family size was 3.16.

In the town, the population was spread out, with 27.9% under the age of 18, 6.7% from 18 to 24, 28.9% from 25 to 44, 28.3% from 45 to 64, and 8.1% who were 65 years of age or older. The median age was 36 years. For every 100 females, there were 104.5 males. For every 100 females age 18 and over, there were 101.1 males.

The median income for a household in the town was $56,250, and the median income for a family was $58,056. Males had a median income of $29,375 versus $26,087 for females. The per capita income for the town was $18,533. About 2.7% of families and 5.2% of the population were below the poverty line, including 7.6% of those under age 18 and 6.1% of those age 65 or over.

== Notable people ==
- Lloyd Tombleson, Wisconsin State Representative, farmer, and educator, lived in the town; Tombleson served as chairman of the Salem Town Board
