= Maiden Rock (town), Wisconsin =

Town in Pierce County, Wisconsin

Maiden Rock, Wisconsin
- Town
- Town of Maiden Rock
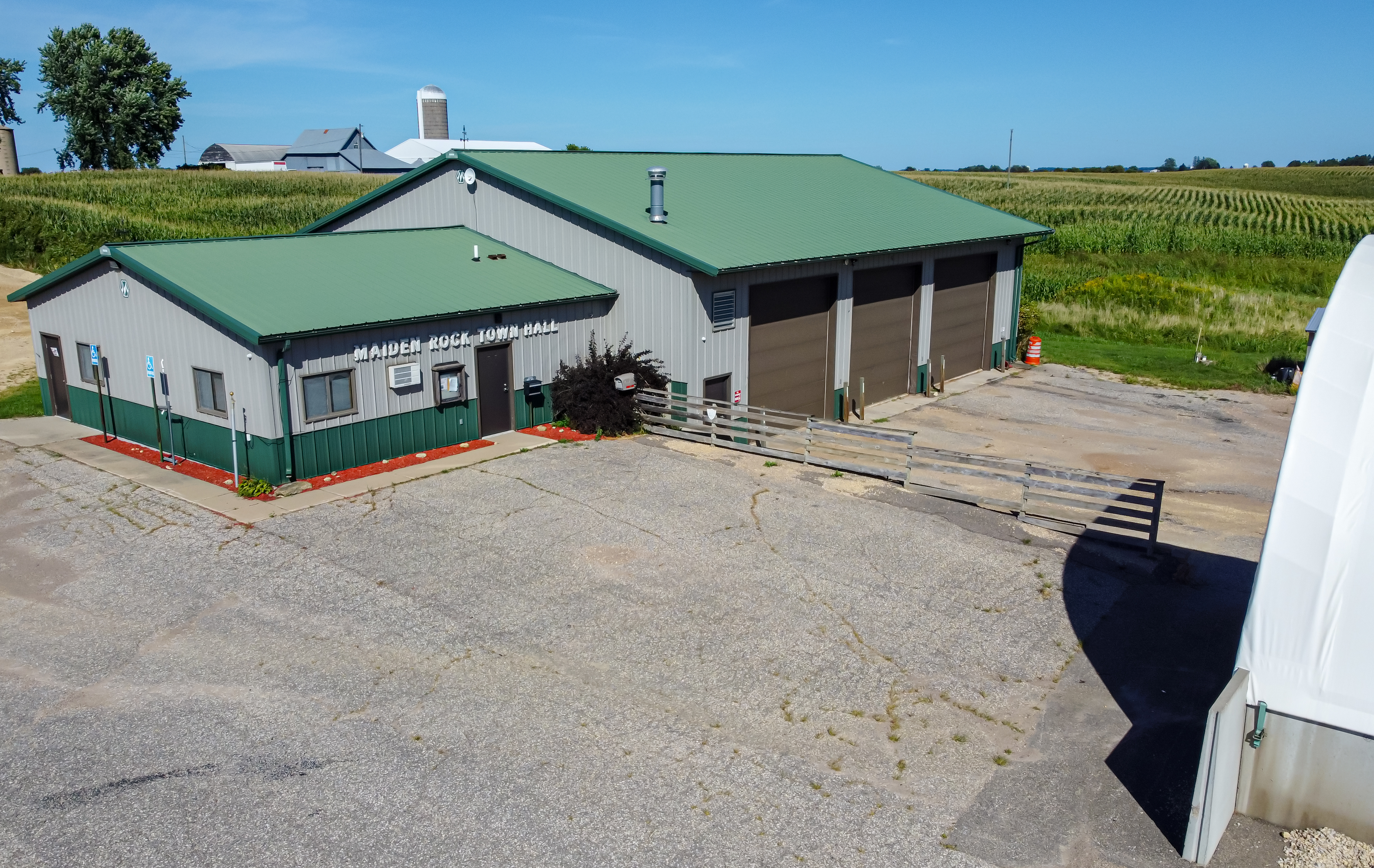
- Maiden Rock Town Hall

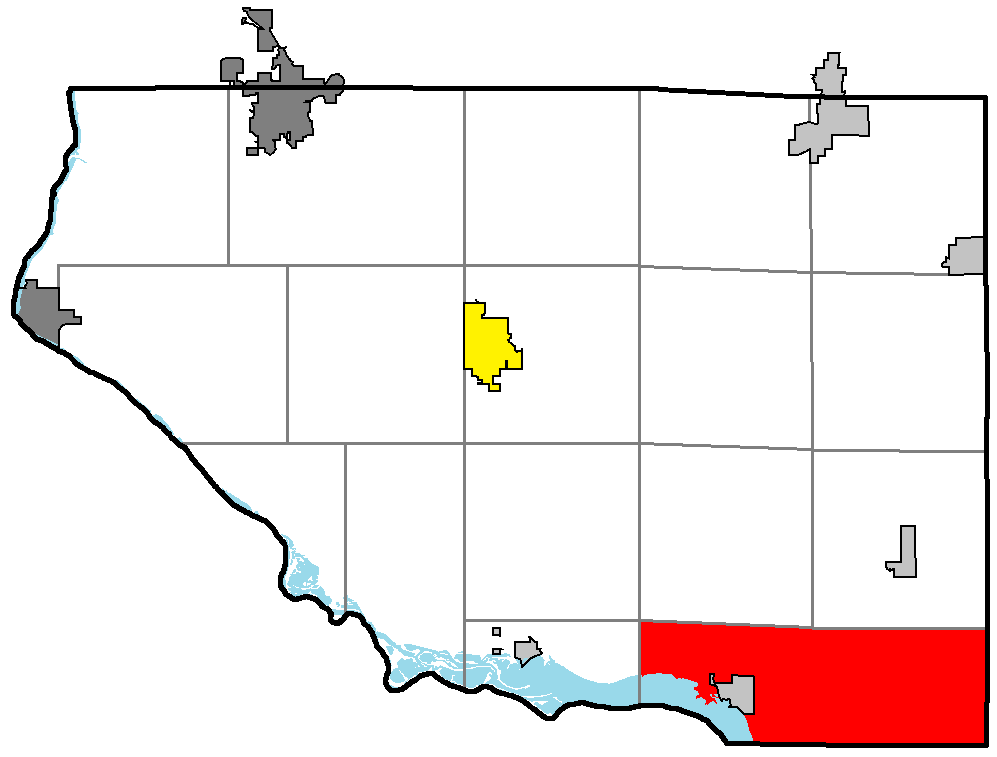
- Location of Maiden Rock, within Pierce County

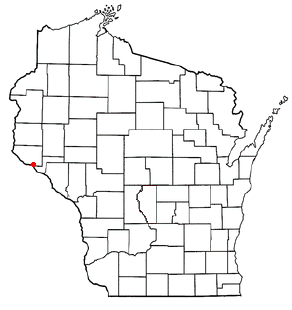
- Location of Maiden Rock, Wisconsin
- Coordinates: 44°34′08″N 92°14′36″W
- Country: United States
- State: Wisconsin
- County: Pierce

Area
  - Total: 44.00 sq mi (114.0 km^{2})
  - Land: 39.88 sq mi (103.3 km^{2})
  - Water: 4.12 sq mi (10.7 km^{2})

Population (2020)
  - Total: 591
  - Density: 14.8/sq mi (5.72/km^{2})
- Time zone: UTC-6 (Central (CST))
  - Summer (DST): UTC-5 (CDT)
- Area code(s): 715 and 534
- GNIS feature ID: 1583629

Maiden Rock is a town in Pierce County, Wisconsin, United States. The population was 591 at the 2020 census. The Village of Maiden Rock is located within the town. The unincorporated communities of Nerike and Warrentown are located in the town. The unincorporated community of Lund is also partially located within the town.

== Geography ==
According to the United States Census Bureau, the town has a total area of 44.1 square miles (114.1 km^{2}), of which 40.3 square miles (104.5 km^{2}) is land and 3.7 square miles (9.7 km^{2}) (8.47%) is water.

== Demographics ==
As of the census of 2000, there were 589 people, 220 households, and 166 families residing in the town. The population density was 14.6 inhabitants per square mile (5.6/km^{2}). There were 256 housing units at an average density of 6.3 per square mile (2.4/km^{2}). The racial makeup of the town was 97.45% White, 0.17% Black or African American, 0.51% Native American, 0.17% Asian, 0.68% from other races, and 1.02% from two or more races. 0.85% of the population were Hispanic or Latino of any race.

There were 220 households, out of which 29.5% had children under the age of 18 living with them, 69.5% were married couples living together, 3.2% had a female householder with no husband present, and 24.1% were non-families. 18.2% of all households were made up of individuals, and 6.4% had someone living alone who was 65 years of age or older. The average household size was 2.68 and the average family size was 3.10.

In the town, the population was spread out, with 25.5% under the age of 18, 7.1% from 18 to 24, 24.6% from 25 to 44, 27.8% from 45 to 64, and 14.9% who were 65 years of age or older. The median age was 42 years. For every 100 females, there were 113.4 males. For every 100 females age 18 and over, there were 111.1 males.

The median income for a household in the town was $45,278, and the median income for a family was $50,875. Males had a median income of $30,833 versus $25,341 for females. The per capita income for the town was $19,553. About 6.8% of families and 11.3% of the population were below the poverty line, including 18.9% of those under age 18 and 7.7% of those age 65 or over.
