= Beldenville, Wisconsin =

- Unincorporated community
- Location within Wisconsin Location within the United States
- Coordinates: 44°46′26″N 92°30′28″W
- Country: United States
- State: Wisconsin
- County: Pierce
- Elevation: 981 ft (299 m)
- Time zone: UTC-6 (Central (CST))
  - Summer (DST): UTC-5 (CDT)
- ZIP code: 54003
- Area codes: 715 & 534
- GNIS feature ID: 1565712

Beldenville is an unincorporated community located in the Town of Trimbelle in Pierce County, Wisconsin, United States. Beldenville is located on Wisconsin Highway 65 north of Ellsworth. Beldenville has a post office with ZIP code 54003.

== History ==
A post office has been in operation at Beldenville since 1858. The community was named for A. Belden, the owner of a local mill.
