= Fred J. Moser =

American politician and educator

Fred J. Moser (May 2, 1898 – August 23 1993) was an American politician and educator.

Born in Plum City, Wisconsin, Moser served in the United States Army during World War I. He graduated from University of Wisconsin–Madison. He was a school administrator, guidance counselor, and teacher in Cumberland, Wisconsin. He served on the Cumberland Common Council and the county school committee. Moser served in the Wisconsin State Assembly in 1965 and was a Democrat.
