= Smith Landing, Wisconsin =

- Unincorporated community
- Location within Wisconsin Location within the United States
- Coordinates: 44°41′21″N 92°41′31″W
- Country: United States
- State: Wisconsin
- County: Pierce
- Elevation: 1,024 ft (312 m)
- Time zone: UTC-6 (Central (CST))
  - Summer (DST): UTC-5 (CDT)
- Area codes: 715 & 534
- GNIS feature ID: 1581162

Smith Landing is an unincorporated community located in the town of Oak Grove, Pierce County, Wisconsin, United States. Smith Landing is located right on the Mississippi River, and situated right in between Prescott and Diamond Bluff.
