= Clarence John Brown =

United States Navy admiral

Clarence John Brown (January 15, 1895 – August 28, 1973) was a Vice Admiral in the United States Navy.

== Biography ==
Brown was born January 15, 1895, in Plum City, Wisconsin. He would graduate from the University of Wisconsin-Madison and marry Augusta Duwe.

He died on August 28, 1973. He is buried with Augusta at Arlington National Cemetery.

== Career ==
Brown was commissioned in the Medical Corps in 1917. His assignments included serving at Naval Base Guam. During World War II he would serve at Guantanamo Bay Naval Base, Naval Hospital Philadelphia, and with the United States Twelfth Fleet. Following the war he was named Deputy Chief of the Bureau of Medicine and Surgery.

Awards he received include the Navy Distinguished Service Medal and the Legion of Merit.
