= Bay City, Wisconsin =

- Village
- Location of Bay City in Pierce County, Wisconsin.
- Coordinates: 44°35′4″N 92°27′10″W
- Country: United States
- State: Wisconsin
- County: Pierce

Area
  - Total: 0.61 sq mi (1.57 km^{2})
  - Land: 0.59 sq mi (1.53 km^{2})
  - Water: 0.015 sq mi (0.04 km^{2})
- Elevation: 692 ft (211 m)

Population (2020)
  - Total: 441
  - Density: 747/sq mi (288/km^{2})
- Time zone: UTC-6 (Central (CST))
  - Summer (DST): UTC-5 (CDT)
- Area codes: 715 & 534
- FIPS code: 55-05325
- GNIS feature ID: 1561318
- Website: https://baycitywi.gov/

Bay City is a village on the Mississippi River in Pierce County, Wisconsin, United States. The population was 441 at the 2020 census.

== Geography ==
Bay City is located at 44°35′4″N 92°27′10″W (44.584517, -92.452749).

According to the United States Census Bureau, the village has a total area of 0.61 square miles (1.58 km^{2}), of which 0.59 square miles (1.53 km^{2}) is land and 0.02 square miles (0.05 km^{2}) is water.

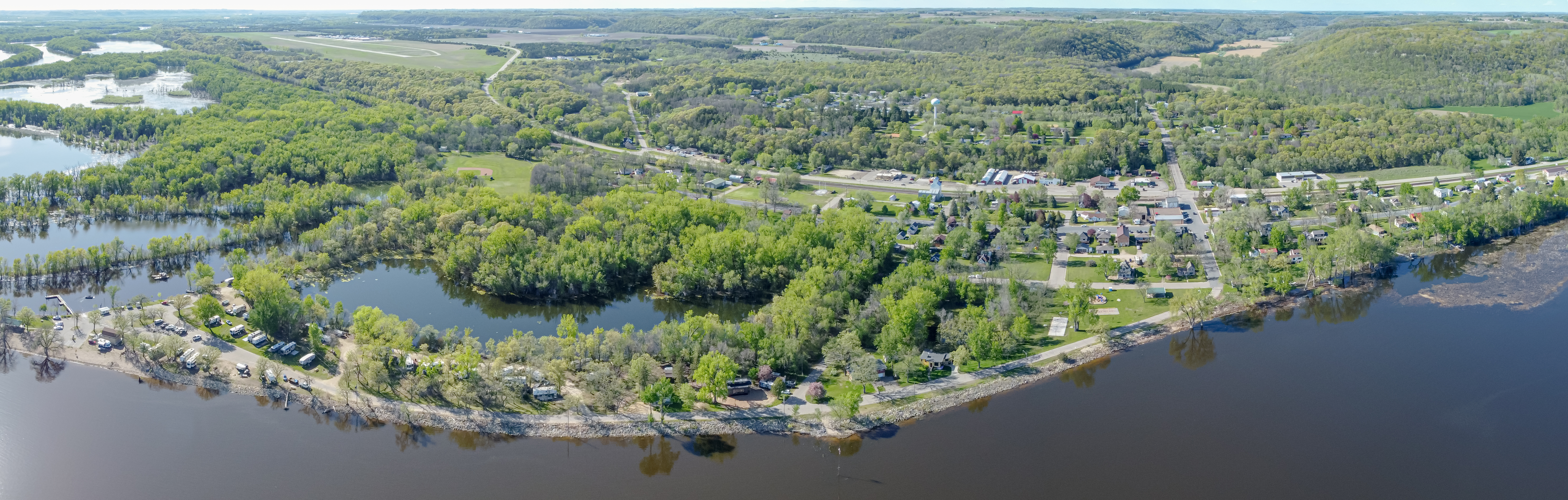

== Demographics ==
Historical population
Census	Pop.	Note	%±
1910	252		—
1920	213		−15.5%
1930	290		36.2%
1940	299		3.1%
1950	326		9.0%
1960	327		0.3%
1970	317		−3.1%
1980	543		71.3%
1990	578		6.4%
2000	465		−19.6%
2010	500		7.5%
2020	441		−11.8%
U.S. Decennial Census

=== 2010 census ===
As of the census of 2010, there were 500 people, 201 households, and 128 families living in the village. The population density was 847.5 inhabitants per square mile (327.2/km^{2}). There were 214 housing units at an average density of 362.7 per square mile (140.0/km^{2}). The racial makeup of the village was 98.4% White, 0.8% African American, 0.2% Native American, 0.4% Asian, and 0.2% from two or more races. Hispanic or Latino of any race were 0.6% of the population.

There were 201 households, of which 35.3% had children under the age of 18 living with them, 45.3% were married couples living together, 10.0% had a female householder with no husband present, 8.5% had a male householder with no wife present, and 36.3% were non-families. 26.9% of all households were made up of individuals, and 6% had someone living alone who was 65 years of age or older. The average household size was 2.49 and the average family size was 3.00.

The median age in the village was 38.4 years. 26.6% of residents were under the age of 18; 5.6% were between the ages of 18 and 24; 28.4% were from 25 to 44; 25.8% were from 45 to 64; and 13.6% were 65 years of age or older. The gender makeup of the village was 50.6% male and 49.4% female.

=== 2000 census ===
As of the census of 2000, there were 465 people, 187 households, and 120 families living in the village. The population density was 904.1 inhabitants per square mile (349.1/km^{2}). There were 193 housing units at an average density of 375.3 per square mile (144.9/km^{2}). The racial makeup of the village was 99.14% White, and 0.86% from two or more races.

There were 187 households, out of which 29.9% had children under the age of 18 living with them, 50.3% were married couples living together, 7.0% had a female householder with no husband present, and 35.8% were non-families. 25.1% of all households were made up of individuals, and 10.2% had someone living alone who was 65 years of age or older. The average household size was 2.49 and the average family size was 2.94.

In the village, the population was spread out, with 23.4% under the age of 18, 7.5% from 18 to 24, 28.0% from 25 to 44, 28.2% from 45 to 64, and 12.9% who were 65 years of age or older. The median age was 40 years. For every 100 females, there were 114.3 males. For every 100 females age 18 and over, there were 114.5 males.

The median income for a household in the village was $47,679, and the median income for a family was $50,962. Males had a median income of $34,844 versus $25,500 for females. The per capita income for the village was $19,598. About 2.3% of families and 6.1% of the population were below the poverty line, including 4.4% of those under age 18 and 6.5% of those age 65 or over.
