= Hartland, Pierce County, Wisconsin =

Hartland, Wisconsin
- Town
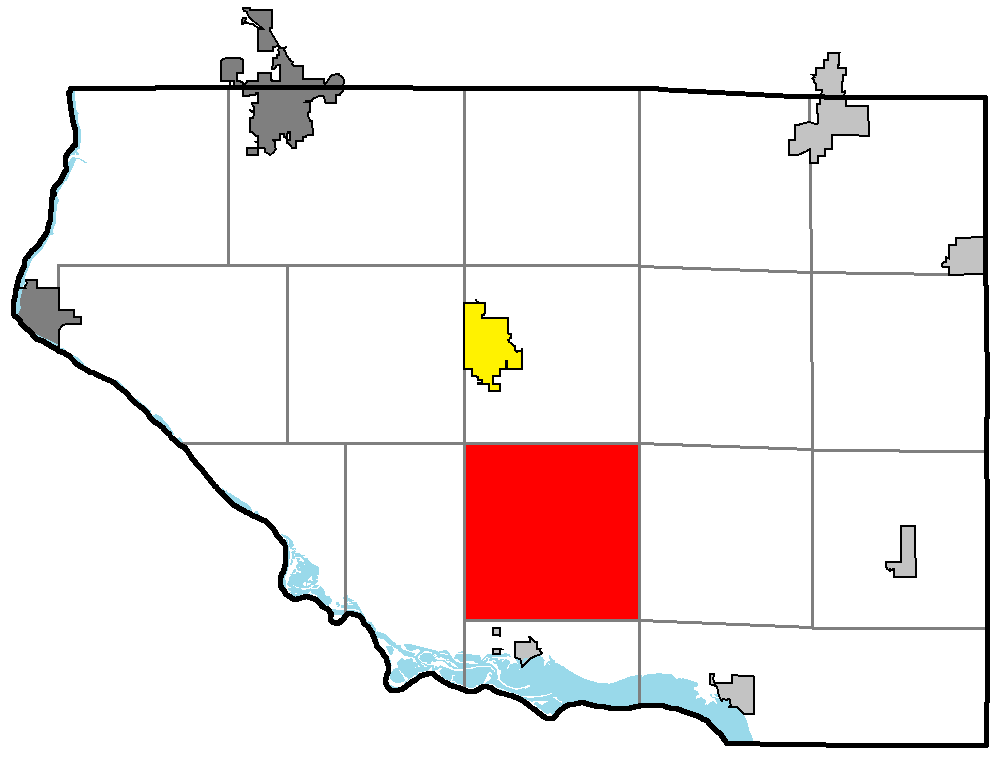
- Location of Hartland, within Pierce County

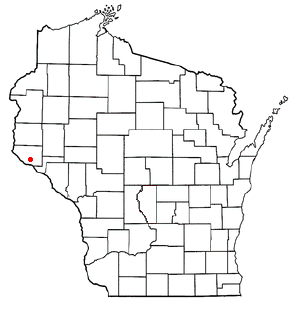
- Location of Hartland, Wisconsin
- Coordinates: 44°38′43″N 92°26′30″W
- Country: United States
- State: Wisconsin
- County: Pierce

Area
  - Total: 36.0 sq mi (93.3 km^{2})
  - Land: 36.0 sq mi (93.3 km^{2})
  - Water: 0 sq mi (0.0 km^{2})
- Elevation: 1,076 ft (328 m)

Population (2020)
  - Total: 830
  - Density: 23/sq mi (8.9/km^{2})
- Time zone: UTC-6 (Central (CST))
  - Summer (DST): UTC-5 (CDT)
- Area codes: 715 & 534
- FIPS code: 55-33050
- GNIS feature ID: 1583361

Hartland is a town in Pierce County, Wisconsin, United States. The population was 830 at the 2020 census. The unincorporated community of Esdaile (/ˈɛzdeɪl/ EZ-dayl) and part of the unincorporated community of Snows Corner are in the town,

== Geography ==
According to the United States Census Bureau, the town has a total area of 36.0 square miles (93.3 km^{2}), all land.

== Demographics ==
As of the census of 2000, there were 814 people, 295 households, and 236 families residing in the town. The population density was 22.6 inhabitants per square mile (8.7/km^{2}). There were 307 housing units at an average density of 8.5 per square mile (3.3/km^{2}). The racial makeup of the town was 98.65% White, 0.74% Native American, 0.25% Asian, 0.12% from other races, and 0.25% from two or more races. Hispanic or Latino of any race were 0.37% of the population.

There were 295 households, out of which 36.3% had children under the age of 18 living with them, 70.2% were married couples living together, 6.4% had a female householder with no husband present, and 19.7% were non-families. 14.9% of all households were made up of individuals, and 3.7% had someone living alone who was 65 years of age or older. The average household size was 2.76 and the average family size was 3.07.

In the town, the population was spread out, with 27.4% under the age of 18, 7.7% from 18 to 24, 30.7% from 25 to 44, 24.0% from 45 to 64, and 10.2% who were 65 years of age or older. The median age was 36 years. For every 100 females, there were 99.5 males. For every 100 females age 18 and over, there were 101.7 males.

The median income for a household in the town was $55,347, and the median income for a family was $59,000. Males had a median income of $34,438 versus $25,294 for females. The per capita income for the town was $21,645. About 3.1% of families and 5.7% of the population were below the poverty line, including 6.3% of those under age 18 and 8.6% of those age 65 or over.

== Notable people ==
- Theodore Swanson, farmer and politician, lived on a farm in the town
