= Trenton, Pierce County, Wisconsin =

Trenton, Wisconsin
- Town
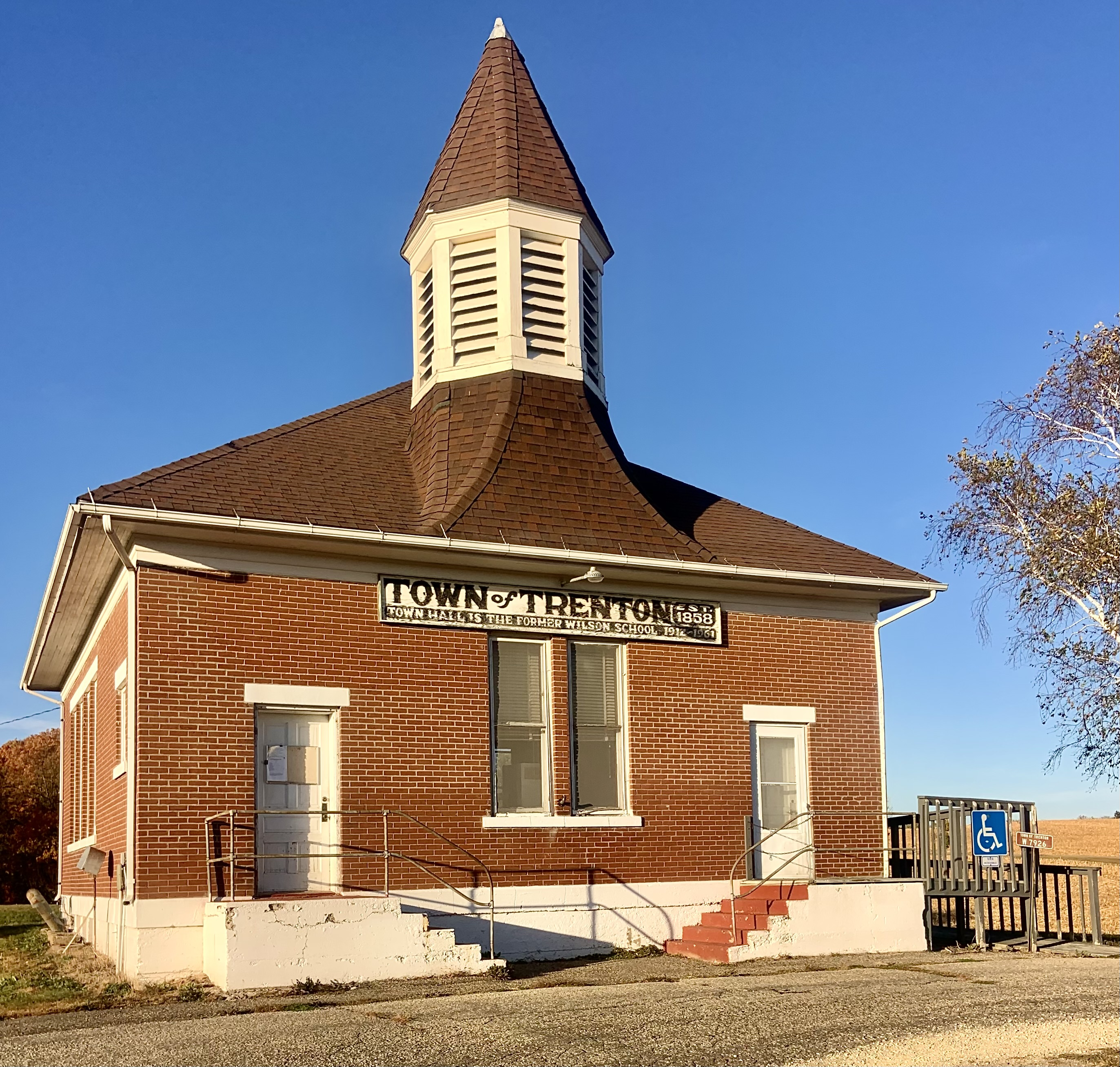
- Town hall

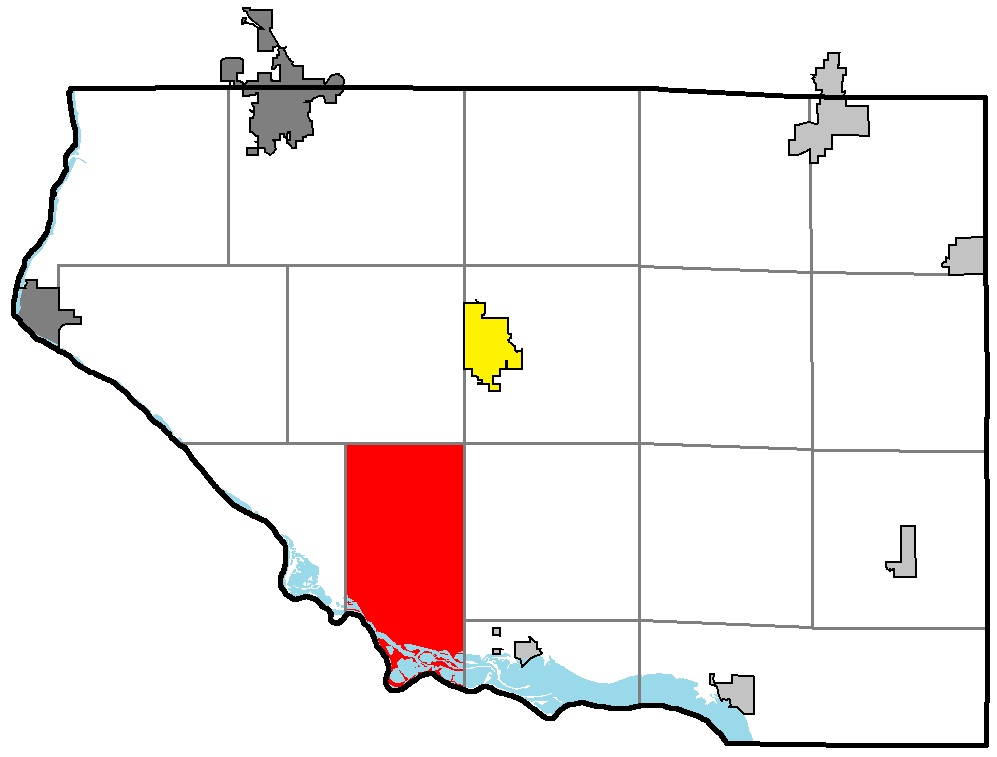
- Location of Trenton, within Pierce County

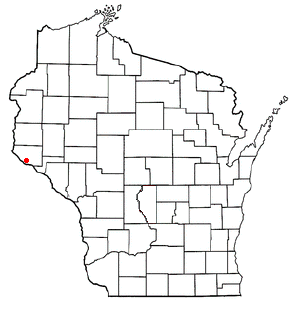
- Location of Trenton, Wisconsin
- Coordinates: 44°37′7″N 92°31′49″W
- Country: United States
- State: Wisconsin
- County: Pierce

Area
  - Total: 30.2 sq mi (78.1 km^{2})
  - Land: 28.1 sq mi (72.8 km^{2})
  - Water: 2.0 sq mi (5.3 km^{2})
- Elevation: 1,014 ft (309 m)

Population (2020)
  - Total: 1,911
  - Density: 68.0/sq mi (26.3/km^{2})
- Time zone: UTC-6 (Central (CST))
  - Summer (DST): UTC-5 (CDT)
- Area codes: 715 & 534
- FIPS code: 55-80550
- GNIS feature ID: 1584293

Trenton is a town in Pierce County, Wisconsin, United States. The population was 1,911 at the time of the 2020 census. The census-designated place of Hager City, and the unincorporated communities of North Red Wing, Pucketville, and Trenton are located in the town. The unincorporated communities of Moeville and Snows Corner are also located partially in the town.

== Geography ==
According to the United States Census Bureau, the town covers a total area of 30.2 square miles (78.1 km^{2}), of which 28.1 square miles (72.8 km^{2}) are land and 2.0 square miles (5.3 km^{2}) (6.80%) are water.

== Demographics ==
As of the census of 2000, there were 1,737 people, 647 households, and 500 families residing in the town. The population density was 61.8 inhabitants per square mile (23.9/km^{2}). There were 671 housing units at an average density of 23.9 per square mile (9.2/km^{2}). The racial makeup of the town was 98.79% White, 0.17% African American, 0.29% Native American, 0.12% Asian, 0.12% from other races, and 0.52% from two or more races. Hispanic or Latino of any race were 0.81% of the population.

There were 647 households, out of which 34.6% had children under the age of 18 living with them, 68.2% were married couples living together, 5.1% had a female householder with no husband present, and 22.6% were non-families. 15.9% of all households were made up of individuals, and 6.5% had someone living alone who was 65 years of age or older. The average household size was 2.68 and the average family size was 3.02.

In the town, the population was spread out, with 25.7% under the age of 18, 7.4% from 18 to 24, 31.5% from 25 to 44, 24.1% from 45 to 64, and 11.3% who were 65 years of age or older. The median age was 37 years. For every 100 females, there were 107.3 males. For every 100 females age 18 and over, there were 104.6 males.

The median income for a household in the town was $53,229, and the median income for a family was $58,224. Males had a median income of $37,028 versus $25,288 for females. The per capita income for the town was $23,634. About 3.5% of families and 5.6% of the population were below the poverty line, including 6.2% of those under age 18 and 3.8% of those age 65 or over.

== Notable people ==
- Clarence R. Magney, Minnesota Supreme Court justice
- Walter C. Owen, Wisconsin Supreme Court justice
