= Pierce County, Wisconsin =

County in Wisconsin, United States

- County
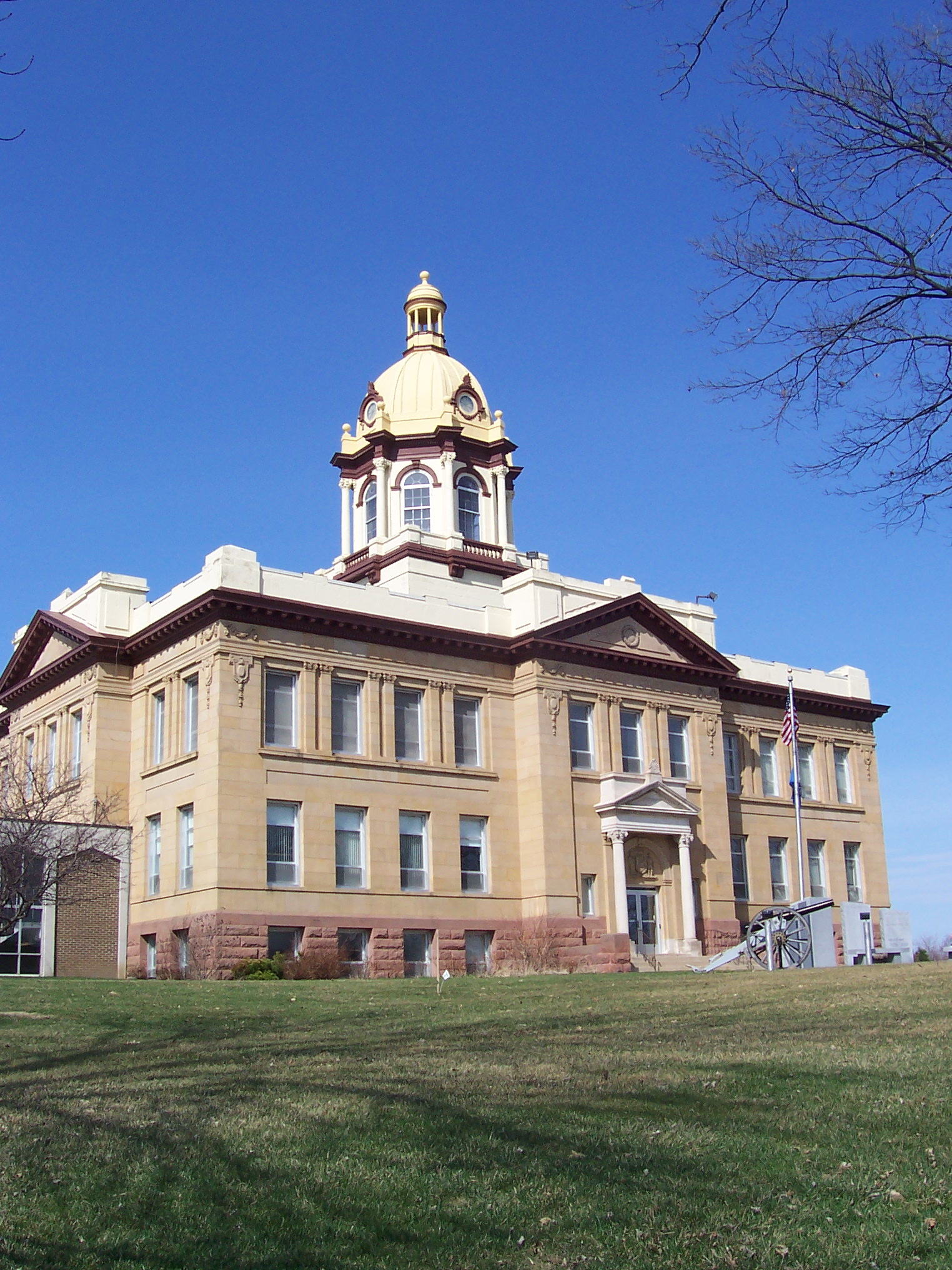
- Pierce County Courthouse

- Location within the U.S. state of Wisconsin
- Coordinates: 44°43′N 92°25′W
- Country: United States
- State: Wisconsin
- Founded: 1853
- Named for: Franklin Pierce
- Seat: Ellsworth
- Largest city: River Falls

Area
  - Total: 592 sq mi (1,530 km^{2})
  - Land: 574 sq mi (1,490 km^{2})
  - Water: 18 sq mi (47 km^{2}) 3.1%

Population (2020)
  - Total: 42,212
  - Estimate (2025): 43,519 ▲
  - Density: 73.5/sq mi (28.4/km^{2})
- Time zone: UTC−6 (Central)
  - Summer (DST): UTC−5 (CDT)
- Congressional district: 3rd
- Website: www.co.pierce.wi.us

Pierce County is a county in the U.S. state of Wisconsin. As of the 2020 census, the population was 42,212. Its county seat is Ellsworth. Pierce County is part of the Minneapolis–St. Paul–Bloomington, MN–WI Metropolitan Statistical Area.

== History ==
Native Americans were the first to live in what became Pierce County, as evidenced in the burial mounds near Diamond Bluff. Evidence indicates that this area has been inhabited for 10,000 to 12,000 years. In 1840, St. Croix County covered a large portion of northwest Wisconsin Territory. In 1853, the Wisconsin State Legislature split St. Croix County into Pierce, Polk, and Saint Croix counties. Pierce County was named for Franklin Pierce, the 14th president of the United States.

== Geography ==
Soils of Pierce County

According to the U.S. Census Bureau, the county has an area of 592 square miles (1,530 km^{2}), of which 574 square miles (1,490 km^{2}) is land and 18 square miles (47 km^{2}) (3.1%) is water.

=== Adjacent counties ===
- St. Croix County – north
- Dunn County – northeast
- Pepin County – southeast
- Goodhue County, Minnesota – south
- Dakota County, Minnesota – southwest
- Washington County, Minnesota – west

=== National protected area ===
- Saint Croix National Scenic Riverway (part)

== Demographics ==
Historical population
Census	Pop.	Note	%±
1860	4,672		—
1870	9,958		113.1%
1880	17,744		78.2%
1890	20,385		14.9%
1900	23,943		17.5%
1910	22,079		−7.8%
1920	21,663		−1.9%
1930	21,043		−2.9%
1940	21,471		2.0%
1950	21,448		−0.1%
1960	22,503		4.9%
1970	26,652		18.4%
1980	31,149		16.9%
1990	32,765		5.2%
2000	36,804		12.3%
2010	41,019		11.5%
2020	42,212		2.9%
2025 (est.)	43,519	▲	3.1%
U.S. Decennial Census; 1790–1960 1900–1990; 1990–2000 2010 2020

=== Racial and ethnic composition ===
Pierce County, Wisconsin – Racial and ethnic composition Note: the US Census treats Hispanic/Latino as an ethnic category. This table excludes Latinos from the racial categories and assigns them to a separate category. Hispanics/Latinos may be of any race.
Race / ethnicity (NH = Non-Hispanic)	Pop 1980	Pop 1990	Pop 2000	Pop 2010	Pop 2020	% 1980	% 1990	% 2000	% 2010	% 2020
White alone (NH)	30,765	32,233	35,896	39,264	38,535	98.77%	98.38%	97.53%	95.72%	91.29%
Black or African American alone (NH)	77	79	91	223	402	0.25%	0.24%	0.25%	0.54%	0.95%
Native American or Alaska Native alone (NH)	37	82	102	141	209	0.12%	0.25%	0.28%	0.34%	0.50%
Asian alone (NH)	103	169	158	299	289	0.33%	0.52%	0.43%	0.73%	0.68%
Native Hawaiian or Pacific Islander alone (NH)	x	x	8	5	10	x	x	0.02%	0.01%	0.02%
Other race alone (NH)	27	6	21	24	139	0.09%	0.02%	0.06%	0.06%	0.33%
Mixed race or Multiracial (NH)	x	x	227	440	1,408	x	x	0.62%	1.07%	3.34%
Hispanic or Latino (any race)	140	196	301	623	1,220	0.45%	0.60%	0.82%	1.52%	2.89%
Total	31,149	32,765	36,804	41,019	42,212	100.00%	100.00%	100.00%	100.00%	100.00%

=== 2020 census ===
As of the 2020 census, the county had a population of 42,212. The median age was 38.0 years; 20.9% of residents were under the age of 18 and 16.0% were 65 years of age or older. For every 100 females there were 99.2 males, and for every 100 females age 18 and over there were 96.8 males age 18 and over. The 2020 redistricting data also reports these totals.

The population density was 73.5 per square mile (28.4/km^{2}). There were 16,780 housing units at an average density of 29.2 unitsper square mile (11.3 units/km^{2}). Of those housing units, 4.9% were vacant, 74.5% of occupied units were owner-occupied, and 25.5% were renter-occupied; the homeowner vacancy rate was 0.7% and the rental vacancy rate was 4.0%.

There were 15,958 households in the county, of which 28.8% had children under the age of 18 living in them. Of all households, 52.7% were married-couple households, 19.4% were households with a male householder and no spouse or partner present, and 19.7% were households with a female householder and no spouse or partner present. About 24.8% of all households were made up of individuals and 9.9% had someone living alone who was 65 years of age or older.

The racial makeup of the county was 92.3% White, 1.0% Black or African American, 0.5% American Indian and Alaska Native, 0.7% Asian, <0.1% Native Hawaiian and Pacific Islander, 1.1% from some other race, and 4.3% from two or more races. Hispanic or Latino residents of any race comprised 2.9% of the population.

30.0% of residents lived in urban areas, while 70.0% lived in rural areas.

=== 2000 census ===
2000 Census Age Pyramid for Pierce County

As of the census of 2000, there were 36,804 people, 13,015 households, and 9,032 families residing in the county. The population density was 64 people per square mile (25 people/km^{2}). There were 13,493 housing units at an average density of 23 units per square mile (8.9 units/km^{2}). The racial makeup of the county was 98.01% White, 0.25% Black or African American, 0.29% Native American, 0.43% Asian, 0.03% Pacific Islander, 0.28% from other races, and 0.72% from two or more races. 0.82% of the population were Hispanic or Latino of any race. 41.0% were of German, 16.2% Norwegian, 7.1% Swedish and 7.1% Irish ancestry.

There were 13,015 households, out of which 35.00% had children under the age of 18 living with them, 58.10% were married couples living together, 7.50% had a female householder with no husband present, and 30.60% were non-families. 21.30% of all households were made up of individuals, and 7.50% had someone living alone who was 65 years of age or older. The average household size was 2.65 and the average family size was 3.10.

In the county, the population was spread out, with 24.40% under the age of 18, 17.00% from 18 to 24, 28.10% from 25 to 44, 20.80% from 45 to 64, and 9.60% who were 65 years of age or older. The median age was 32 years. For every 100 females there were 97.30 males. For every 100 females age 18 and over, there were 94.20 males.

In 2017, there were 386 births, giving a general fertility rate of 43.7 births per 1000 women aged 15–44, the lowest rate out of all 72 Wisconsin counties.

== Communities ==
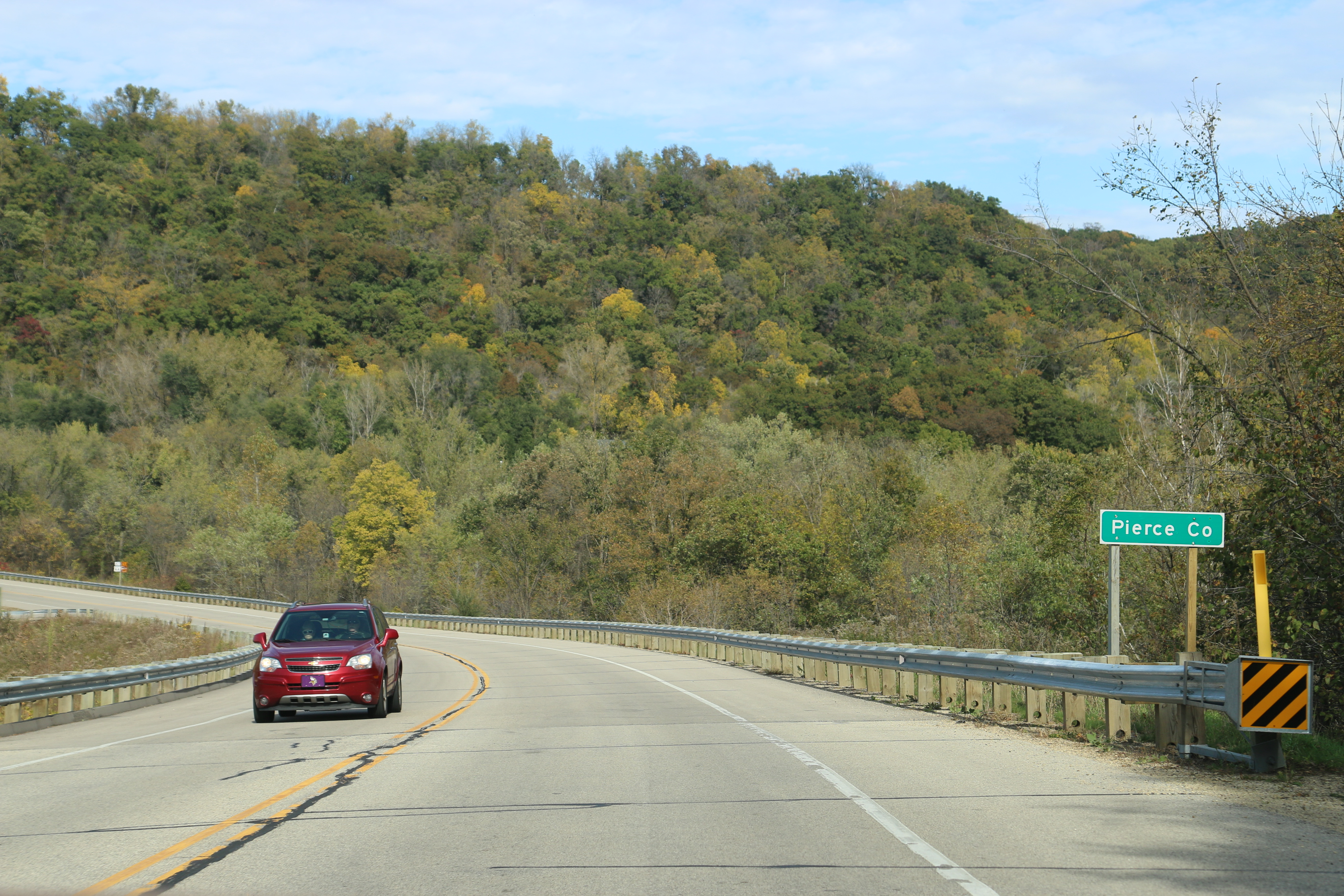
The sign for Pierce County on WIS35

=== Cities ===
- Prescott
- River Falls (partly in St. Croix County)

=== Villages ===
- Bay City
- Ellsworth (county seat)
- Elmwood
- Maiden Rock
- Plum City
- Spring Valley (partly in St. Croix County)

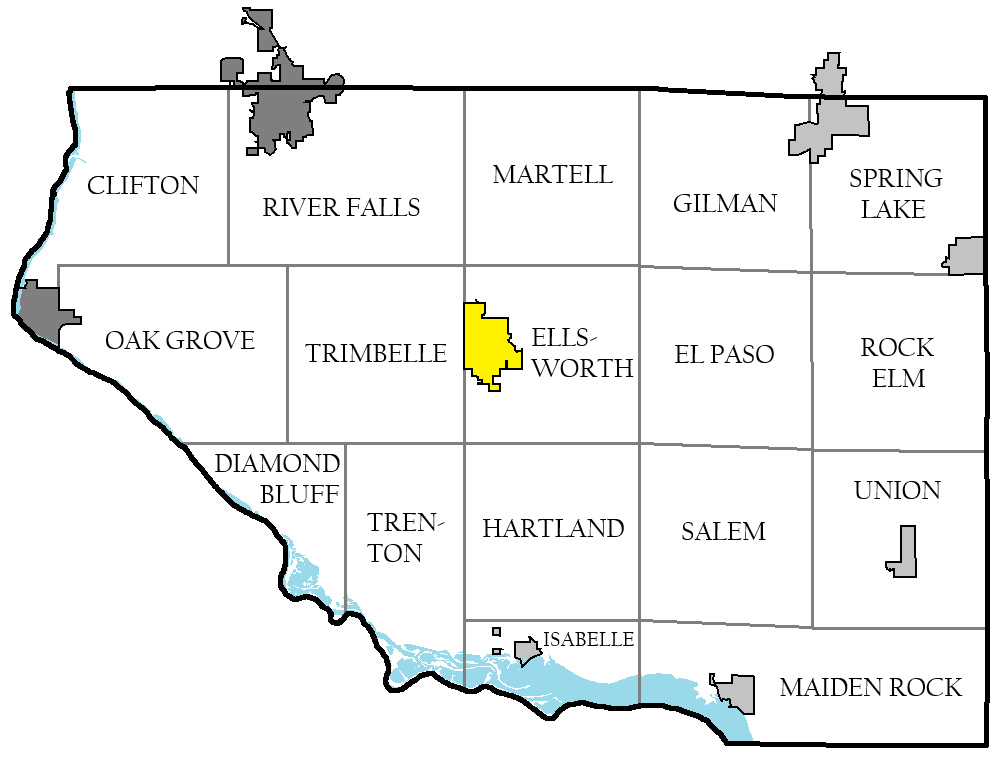
Towns of Pierce County

=== Towns ===
- Clifton
- Diamond Bluff
- El Paso
- Ellsworth
- Gilman
- Hartland
- Isabelle
- Maiden Rock
- Martell
- Oak Grove
- River Falls
- Rock Elm
- Salem
- Spring Lake
- Trenton
- Trimbelle
- Union

=== Census-designated places ===
- Diamond Bluff
- Hager City

=== Unincorporated communities ===
- Beldenville
- El Paso
- Esdaile
- Exile
- Hatchville (partly in St. Croix County and Dunn County)
- Lawton
- Lund (partly in Pepin County)
- Martell
- Moeville
- Morton Corner
- Nerike
- North Red Wing
- Oakridge
- Olivet
- Ono
- Ottman Corners
- Pucketville
- Rock Elm
- Salem
- Smith Landing
- Snows Corner
- Trenton
- Trimbelle
- Viking (partly in St. Croix County)
- Warrentown
- Waverly

=== Ghost town/neighborhood ===
- Brasington
- Farmhill
- Lost Creek

== Transportation ==
=== Railroads ===
- BNSF

== Politics ==
Originally a swing county, Pierce joined the Democratic column beginning in 1988. In 2012, Republican Mitt Romney won the county by a narrow 162-vote plurality, and it has trended more Republican ever since. In 2024, Donald Trump's performance was the strongest for a Republican in the county since Dwight Eisenhower in 1956.

United States presidential election results for Pierce County, Wisconsin
Year	Republican		Democratic		Third party(ies)	
Year	No.	%	No.	%	No.	%
1892	2,315	57.66%	1,210	30.14%	490	12.20%
1896	3,724	69.79%	1,412	26.46%	200	3.75%
1900	3,433	72.95%	1,041	22.12%	232	4.93%
1904	3,492	82.28%	594	14.00%	158	3.72%
1908	2,988	71.62%	978	23.44%	206	4.94%
1912	986	29.13%	985	29.10%	1,414	41.77%
1916	1,945	51.88%	1,650	44.01%	154	4.11%
1920	4,441	82.62%	644	11.98%	290	5.40%
1924	2,788	40.97%	298	4.38%	3,719	54.65%
1928	6,491	67.65%	3,017	31.44%	87	0.91%
1932	3,537	44.32%	4,115	51.57%	328	4.11%
1936	3,935	42.70%	4,061	44.06%	1,220	13.24%
1940	6,624	66.25%	3,259	32.59%	116	1.16%
1944	5,137	62.40%	3,033	36.84%	63	0.77%
1948	3,753	45.18%	4,395	52.91%	158	1.90%
1952	6,763	67.49%	3,241	32.34%	17	0.17%
1956	5,782	61.13%	3,644	38.53%	32	0.34%
1960	5,632	56.56%	4,317	43.35%	9	0.09%
1964	3,291	34.05%	6,351	65.70%	24	0.25%
1968	4,990	48.76%	4,783	46.74%	461	4.50%
1972	5,899	50.35%	5,611	47.89%	206	1.76%
1976	5,676	40.36%	8,039	57.16%	349	2.48%
1980	6,209	39.68%	7,312	46.73%	2,125	13.58%
1984	7,612	50.74%	7,289	48.58%	102	0.68%
1988	6,045	40.87%	8,659	58.55%	85	0.57%
1992	4,844	28.05%	7,824	45.30%	4,604	26.66%
1996	4,599	30.66%	7,970	53.13%	2,431	16.21%
2000	8,169	45.48%	8,559	47.65%	1,234	6.87%
2004	10,437	47.71%	11,176	51.09%	263	1.20%
2008	9,812	44.38%	11,803	53.39%	492	2.23%
2012	10,397	49.46%	10,235	48.69%	388	1.85%
2016	11,272	52.73%	8,399	39.29%	1,705	7.98%
2020	12,815	54.96%	9,796	42.01%	706	3.03%
2024	14,417	56.78%	10,171	40.06%	804	3.17%

== See also ==
- National Register of Historic Places listings in Pierce County, Wisconsin
