= Solomon Nason =

American politician

Solomon L. Nason (December 16, 1825 – April 1, 1899) was an American farmer and lumberman from Nasonville, Wisconsin who served one term as a Greenback Party member of the Wisconsin State Assembly, representing Clark, Lincoln, Taylor and Wood counties.

== Background ==
Nason was born on December 16, 1825 in Standish, in Cumberland County, Maine, and received a state school education. He became a farmer and lumberman. Nason moved to California in 1849, but returned to Maine in 1853, and in that same year moved to Wisconsin, settling in Wood County, along with his brother, William G. Nason, in the spring of 1855. They settled in the area later known as "Nasonville" (at that time commencing about three or four miles southwest of what was to become Marshfield, and extending towards Maple Works and Neillsville in Clark County) since the Nason brothers had early settled at a site about eleven miles southwest of Marshfield. The Nasons settled permanently in what would later be termed Nasonville proper in September 1856, buying land in Section 5, Town 24 N, Range 2 E (Rock Township), and also buying several adjoining sections. Solomon later donated a portion of this land, on which the hamlet of Lindsey would be erected. Solomon Nason established and kept a store in Nasonville, and when a Nasonville post office was established was appointed postmaster in 1859, serving in that capacity until 1878.

== Public service ==
At the time of his election to the assembly, Solomon Nason had played a leading part in the organization of the Town of Lincoln and had been the chairman of the board of supervisors for eight years, and county commissioner of Wood County under the commissioner system (which was in force from January, 1862 to March, 1870) for two years.

== Legislative service ==
Nason was nominated by the Greenbacks in 1877, and was elected to the Assembly without opposition, with 2,923 votes. (Republican incumbent Freeman Lindsay was not a candidate.) He was assigned to the standing committee on state lands. He was not a candidate for re-election, and the seat was taken by Republican Niran Withee.
