= Kurth, Wisconsin =

- Ghost town
- Location within Wisconsin
- Coordinates: 44°34′27″N 90°29′48″W
- Country: United States
- State: Wisconsin
- County: Clark
- Town: Grant
- Elevation: 1,079 ft (329 m)
- GNIS feature ID: 1837683

Kurth is a ghost town in the town of Grant, Clark County, Wisconsin, United States. Kurth is 2 miles (3.2 km) west-southwest of Granton. The community appeared on USGS maps as late as 1954.

== History ==
The community was named for Robert Kurth, a grain merchant.
