= Rock, Wisconsin =

Rock is the name of some places in the U.S. state of Wisconsin:

- Rock, Rock County, Wisconsin
- Rock, Wood County, Wisconsin
