= Sigel, Wisconsin =

Sigel is the name of some places in the U.S. state of Wisconsin:

- Sigel, Chippewa County, Wisconsin, a town
- Sigel, Wood County, Wisconsin, a town
