= Grant, Clark County, Wisconsin =

Grant, Wisconsin
- Town
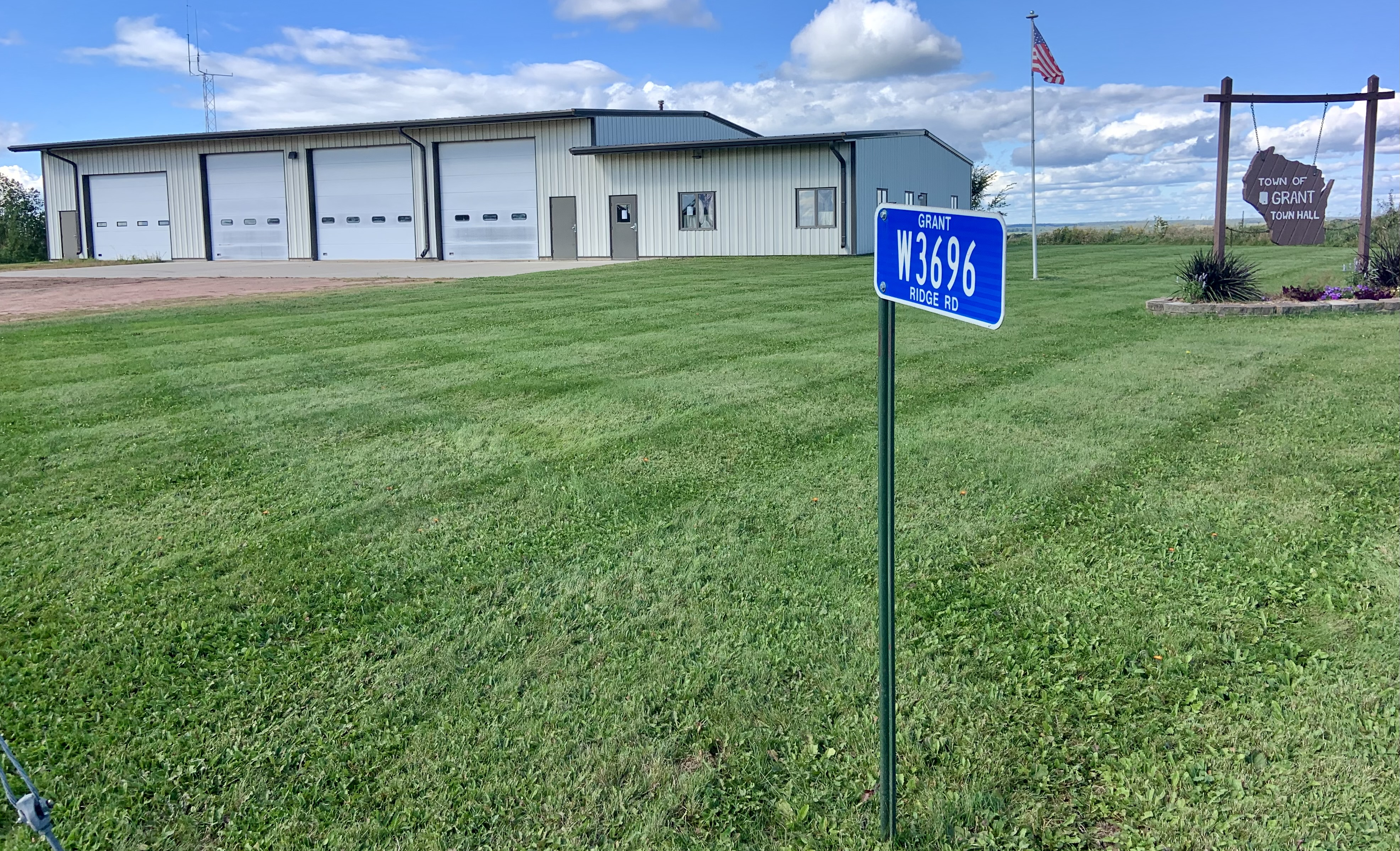
- Town hall

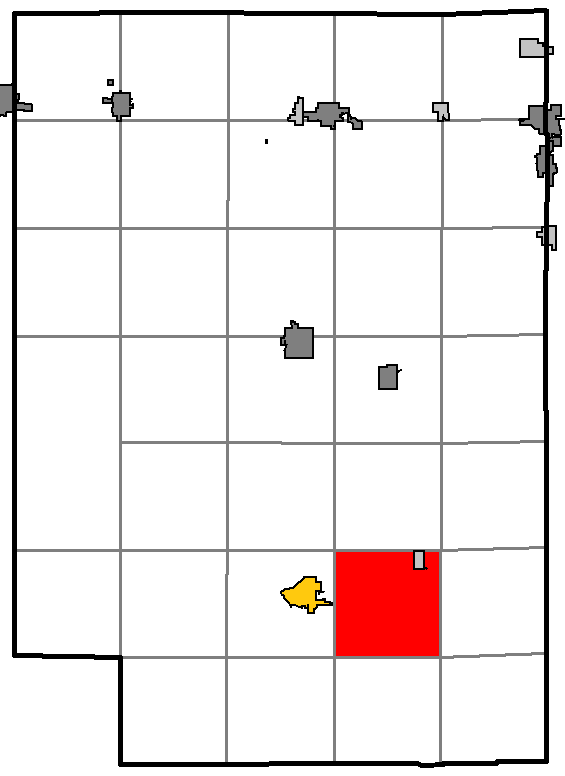
- Location of Grant, Clark County

- Location of Clark County, Wisconsin
- Coordinates: 44°33′24″N 90°29′13″W
- Country: United States
- State: Wisconsin
- County: Clark

Area
  - Total: 35.7 sq mi (92.4 km^{2})
  - Land: 35.5 sq mi (92.0 km^{2})
  - Water: 0.12 sq mi (0.3 km^{2})
- Elevation: 1,155 ft (352 m)

Population (2020)
  - Total: 858
  - Density: 24.2/sq mi (9.33/km^{2})
- Time zone: UTC-6 (Central (CST))
  - Summer (DST): UTC-5 (CDT)
- Area codes: 715 & 534
- FIPS code: 55-30275
- GNIS feature ID: 1583298

Grant is a town in Clark County in the U.S. state of Wisconsin. The population was 858 at the 2020 census. The ghost towns of Kurth and Maple Works were located in the town.

== Geography ==
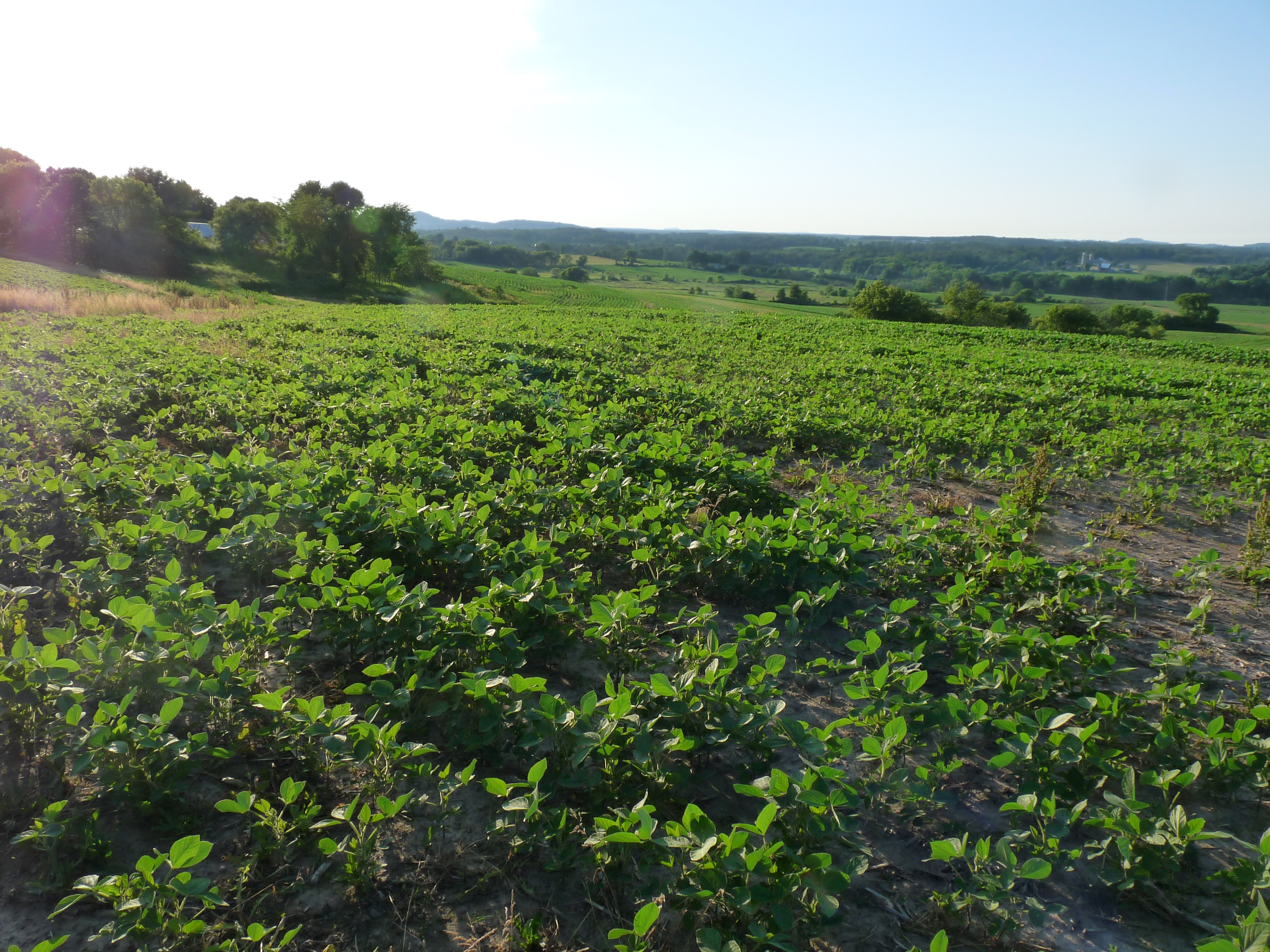
Looking north from highway 10

The Town of Grant is in southeastern Clark County. The village of Granton is in the northeastern corner of the town. According to the United States Census Bureau, the town has a total area of 35.7 square miles (92.4 km^{2}), of which 35.5 square miles (92.0 km^{2}) is land and 0.1 square miles (0.3 km^{2}), or 0.35%, is water.

== Demographics ==
As of the census of 2000, there were 920 people, 317 households, and 248 families residing in the town. The population density was 25.7 people per square mile (9.9/km^{2}). There were 361 housing units at an average density of 10.1 per square mile (3.9/km^{2}). The racial makeup of the town was 99.02% White, 0.87% from other races, and 0.11% from two or more races. Hispanic or Latino of any race were 1.74% of the population.

There were 317 households, out of which 37.2% had children under the age of 18 living with them, 68.1% were married couples living together, 5.0% had a female householder with no husband present, and 21.5% were non-families. 18.0% of all households were made up of individuals, and 10.7% had someone living alone who was 65 years of age or older. The average household size was 2.90 and the average family size was 3.27.

In the town, the population was spread out, with 31.4% under the age of 18, 7.5% from 18 to 24, 26.6% from 25 to 44, 20.9% from 45 to 64, and 13.6% who were 65 years of age or older. The median age was 35 years. For every 100 females, there were 105.4 males. For every 100 females age 18 and over, there were 107.6 males.

The median income for a household in the town was $36,518, and the median income for a family was $40,764. Males had a median income of $28,182 versus $19,306 for females. The per capita income for the town was $16,065. About 9.8% of families and 13.5% of the population were below the poverty line, including 20.7% of those under age 18 and 10.2% of those age 65 or over.

== Notable people ==
- Spencer M. Marsh, jurist and legislator born in the town
