= Amos E. Germer =

American politician and lawyer

Amos E. Germer (May 28, 1862 – September 8, 1935) was an American politician and lawyer.

Born in Cincinnatus, New York, Germer was educated at Cornell University, University of Iowa, and the Lake Forest University Law School. In 1883, Germer moved to Wisconsin, was in the lumber business, and practiced law. He served on the Pittsville, Wisconsin Common Council and was president of the common council and on the Dexterville, Wisconsin School Board. Germer also served on the Wood County, Wisconsin Board of Supervisors and was chairman. In 1899, Germer served in the Wisconsin State Assembly from Dexterville, Wisconsin and was a Democrat. In 1908, Germer moved to Crandon, Wisconsin and served as city attorney and first mayor of Crandon. Germer also served on the Forest County, Wisconsin Board of Supervisors and was chairman of the board. He also served as Wisconsin Circuit Court commissioner. Germer died in Crandon, Wisconsin after having a stroke two weeks earlier.
