= Nasonville =

Nasonville may refer to:

- Nasonville, Rhode Island
- Nasonville, Wisconsin
