= Lindsey Bluffs =

Ridge in Wisconsin

Coordinates: 44°33′43″N 90°17′15″W

Lindsey Bluffs is a ridge in the U.S. state of Wisconsin. The elevation is 1,250 feet (380 m).

Lindsey Bluffs takes its name from the community of Lindsey, Wisconsin, which in turn has the name of F. D. Lindsey, a businessperson in the lumber industry.
