= Nasonville, Wisconsin =

- Unincorporated community
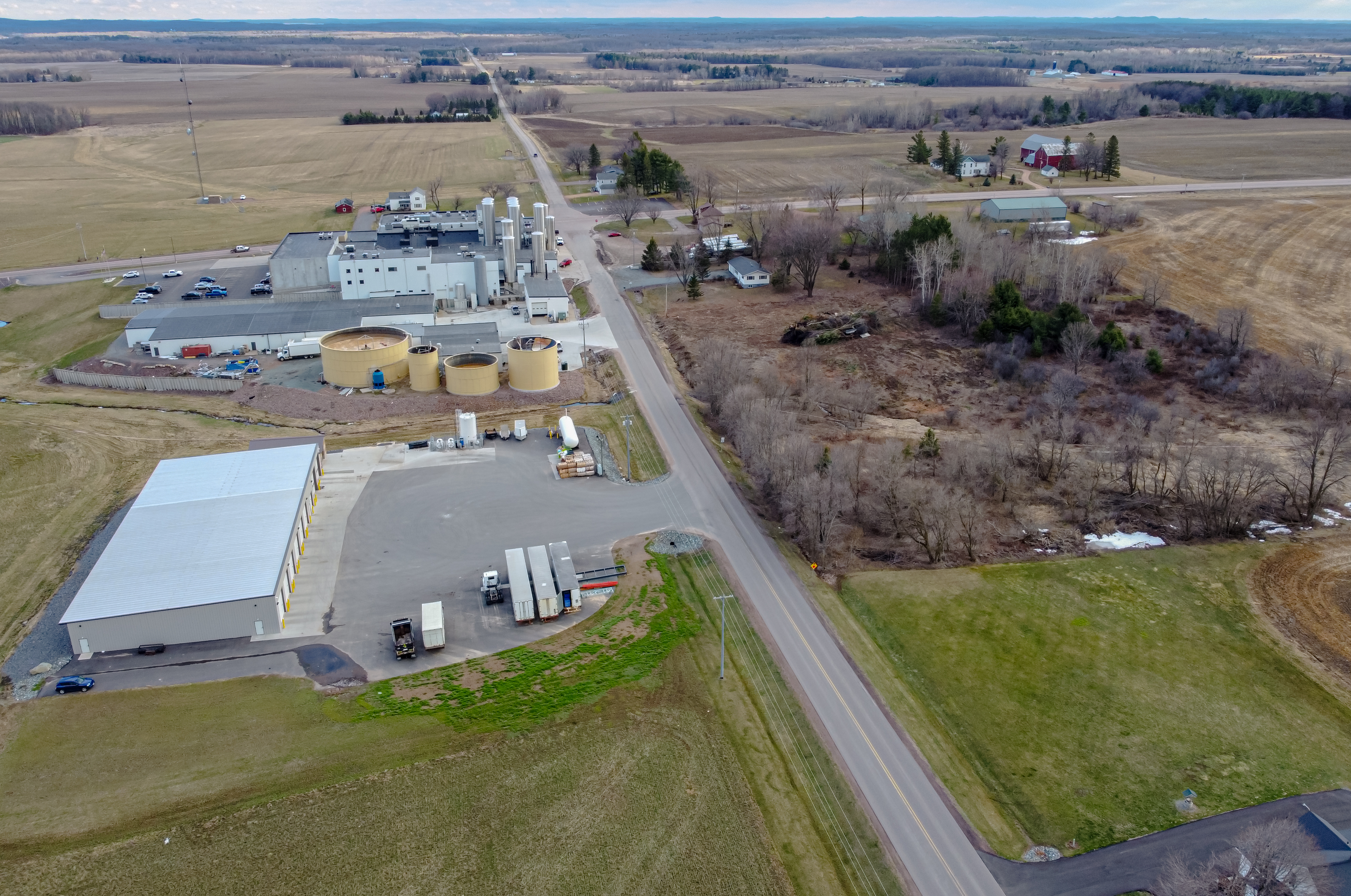
- US-10 runs through town

- Location within Wisconsin Location within the United States
- Coordinates: 44°35′56″N 90°15′30″W
- Country: United States
- State: Wisconsin
- County: Wood
- Elevation: 1,335 ft (407 m)
- Time zone: UTC-6 (Central (CST))
  - Summer (DST): UTC-5 (CDT)
- Area codes: 715 & 534
- GNIS feature ID: 1570110

Nasonville is an unincorporated community located in the town of Rock, Wood County, Wisconsin, United States.

== History ==
The name "Nasonville" at one time applied to a vague region commencing about three or four miles southwest of what was to become Marshfield, and extending towards Maple Works and Neillsville in Clark County, since the brothers Solomon L. and William G. Nason had settled at a site about eleven miles southwest of Marshfield in the Spring of 1855. The Nasons were from Cumberland County, Maine. They settled permanently in what would later be termed Nasonville proper in September 1856, buying land in Section 5, Town 24 N, Range 2 E (Rock Township), and also buying several adjoining sections. Solomon later donated a portion of this land, on which the hamlet of Lindsey would be erected. Solomon Nason established and kept a store in Nasonville, and when a Nasonville post office was established was appointed postmaster in 1859, serving in that capacity until 1878. The Nasonville post office closed permanently in 1900.

== Notable people ==
- Solomon Nason, pioneer, legislator
