= Walker, Wisconsin =

- Unincorporated community
- Location within Wisconsin Location within the United States
- Coordinates: 44°23′10″N 89°58′43″W
- Country: United States
- State: Wisconsin
- County: Wood
- Elevation: 1,010 ft (310 m)
- Time zone: UTC-6 (Central (CST))
  - Summer (DST): UTC-5 (CDT)
- Area codes: 715 & 534
- GNIS feature ID: 1847130

Walker is an unincorporated community in the town of Cranmoor, Wood County, Wisconsin, United States.

Walker was named in honor of a railroad agent.
