= Veedum, Wisconsin =

- Unincorporated community
- Location within Wisconsin Location within the United States
- Coordinates: 44°24′35″N 90°10′24″W
- Country: United States
- State: Wisconsin
- County: Wood
- Elevation: 1,033 ft (315 m)
- Time zone: UTC-6 (Central (CST))
  - Summer (DST): UTC-5 (CDT)
- Area codes: 715 & 534
- GNIS feature ID: 1576053

Veedum is an unincorporated community located in the town of Dexter, Wood County, Wisconsin, United States.

== History ==
Veedum was founded in 1887 when the railroad was extended to that point. The name may be a transfer from Vedum, in Sweden. A post office opened at Veedum in 1901, and remained in operation until 1917. Railroad service to Veedum ended in 1933.
