= Dexterville, Wisconsin =

- Unincorporated community
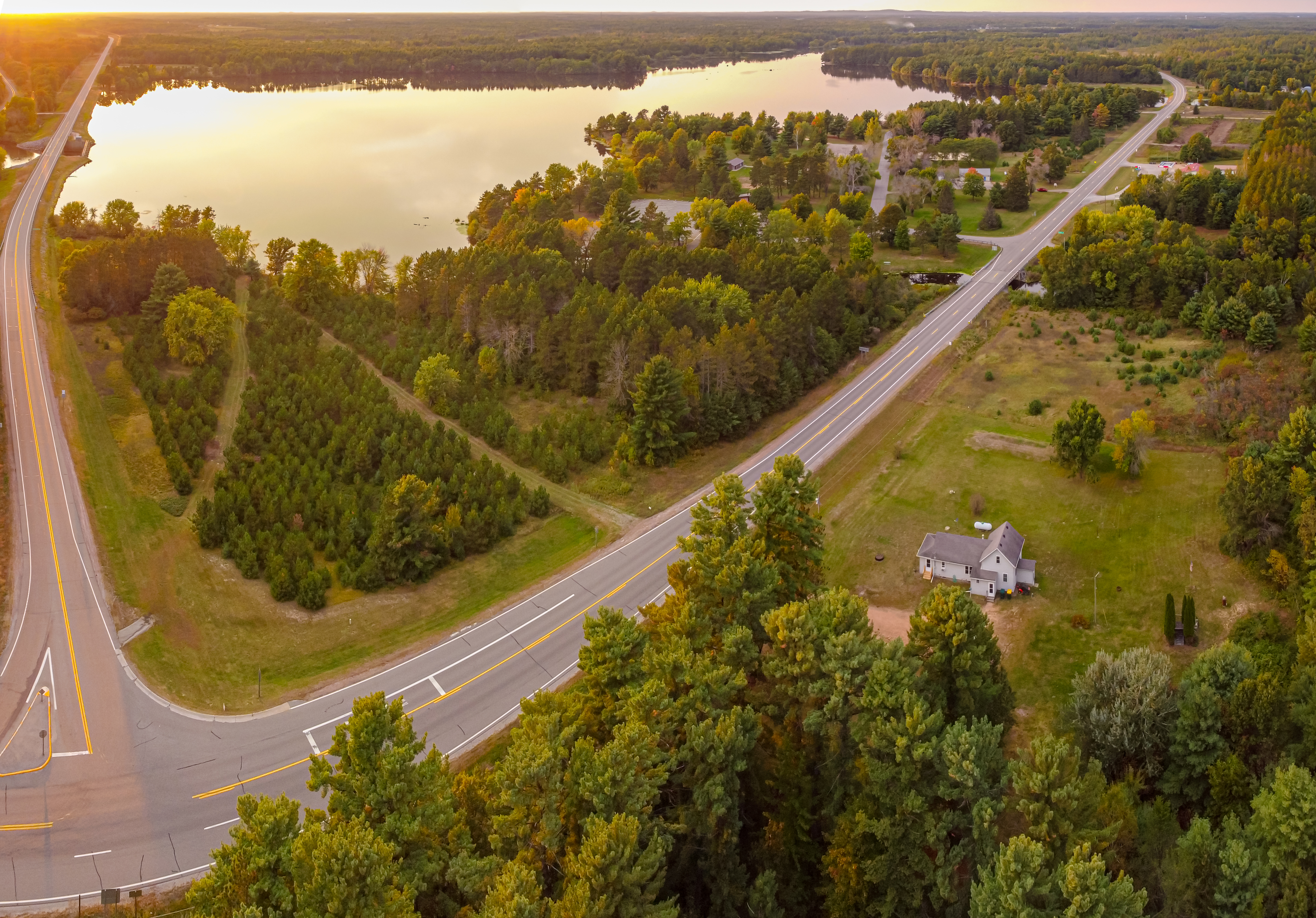
- Wis-80 and Wis-54 junction in town

- Location within Wisconsin Location within the United States
- Coordinates: 44°22′35″N 90°06′38″W
- Country: United States
- State: Wisconsin
- County: Wood
- Elevation: 991 ft (302 m)
- Time zone: UTC-6 (Central (CST))
  - Summer (DST): UTC-5 (CDT)
- Area codes: 715 & 534
- GNIS feature ID: 1563957

Dexterville is an unincorporated community in the town of Dexter, Wood County, Wisconsin, United States. It is located at the intersection of state highways 80 and 54.

== History ==
Dexterville was founded in about 1848. In 1850, the sawmilling magnate George Hiles moved to the area and set up a lumbermill in Dexterville. Dexter township may be named after Dexter, Michigan, the native home of a first settler, although folk etymology maintains the township is named after the mule of a local pioneer. Hiles was granted a post office for Dexterville in 1858. He created the Milwaukee, Dexterville, and Northern Railroad in 1887 to carry timber from the area. The railroad was purchased by the Chicago, Milwaukee, St. Paul and Pacific Railroad a few years later, and passed through the community in 1890.

The Dexterville Dam is located on the southern edge of Lake Dexter; it dams the Yellow River, creating Dexter Lake. The dam was created by Wood County to provide waterfront for the current Dexter County Park. A county worker died performing maintenance on the dam in 2009.

== Notable people ==
- Amos E. Germer, lawyer and politician, lived in Dexterville.
