= Lindsey, Wisconsin =

- Unincorporated community
- Location within Wisconsin Location within the United States
- Coordinates: 44°33′21″N 90°18′00″W
- Country: United States
- State: Wisconsin
- County: Wood
- Elevation: 1,158 ft (353 m)
- Time zone: UTC-6 (Central (CST))
  - Summer (DST): UTC-5 (CDT)
- Area codes: 715 & 534
- GNIS feature ID: 1568143

Lindsey is an unincorporated community located in the town of Rock, Wood County, Wisconsin, United States. Lindsey is located at the junction of County Highways V and N, 10 miles (16 km) southwest of Marshfield.

== History ==
Lindsey was originally part of the vague region called Nasonville since the brothers Solomon L. and William G. Nason had settled at a site about eleven miles southwest of Marshfield in the spring of 1855. The Nasons were from Cumberland County, Maine. They settled permanently in what would later be termed Nasonville proper in September 1856, buying land in Section 5, Town 24 N, Range 2 E (Rock Township), and also buying several adjoining sections. Solomon later donated a portion of this land, on which Lindsey would be erected.

Lindsey was first platted in 1891, and named after F. D. Lindsey, a businessperson in the local lumber industry.

== See also ==
- Lindsey Bluffs
