= Cranmoor, Wisconsin =

- Town
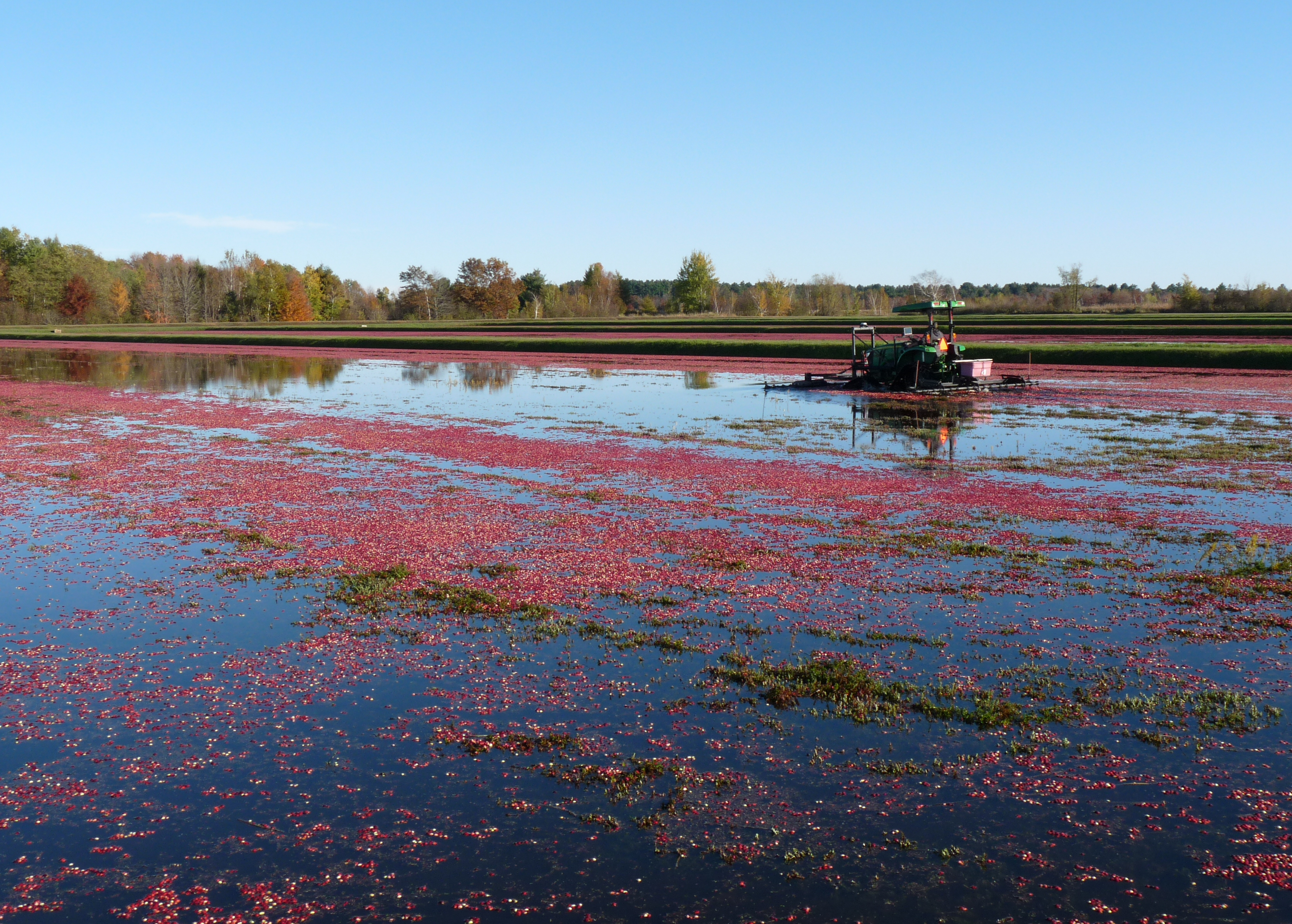
- Harvesting cranberries along highway 54 in October

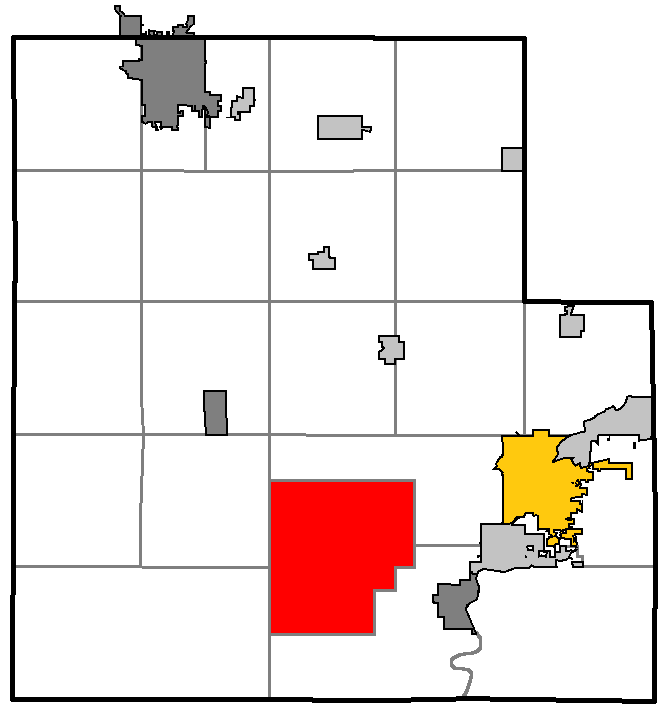
- Location of Cranmoor, Wood County

- Location of Wood County, Wisconsin
- Coordinates: 44°21′16″N 90°1′1″W
- Country: United States
- State: Wisconsin
- County: Wood

Area
  - Total: 42.4 sq mi (109.7 km^{2})
  - Land: 36.7 sq mi (95.1 km^{2})
  - Water: 5.6 sq mi (14.5 km^{2})
- Elevation: 988 ft (301 m)

Population (2020)
  - Total: 181
  - Density: 4.93/sq mi (1.90/km^{2})
- Time zone: UTC-6 (Central (CST))
  - Summer (DST): UTC-5 (CDT)
- Area codes: 715 & 534
- FIPS code: 55-17525
- GNIS feature ID: 1583025
- PLSS township: most of T22N R4E and parts of T22N R5E and T21N R4E

Cranmoor is a town in Wood County, Wisconsin, United States. The population was 181 at the 2020 census. The unincorporated communities of Cranmoor and Walker are located in the town.

== Geography ==
According to the United States Census Bureau, the town has a total area of 42.3 square miles (109.7 km^{2}), of which 36.7 square miles (95.2 km^{2}) is land and 5.6 square miles (14.5 km^{2}) (13.23%) is water.

== History ==
In the spring of 1839, parts of Cranmoor were surveyed by government surveyors as they measured their way east from the Fourth principal meridian, working their way over to the Wisconsin River, to survey the "Indian strip" along the river which was ceded by the Menominee to the U.S. government in the 1836 Treaty of the Cedars.

In the winter of 1851–1852 a crew working for the U.S. government surveyed all the section corners of the land that would become Cranmoor, walking through the woods and probably crossing the marshes on the ice, measuring with chain and compass. When done, the deputy surveyor filed this general description of the six mile square that now includes northwest Cranmoor:

This Township is very nearly all covered either with Marsh or swamp there is not to exceed in the Township two Sections of land that would admit of cultivation and that in detached parcels, not exceeding 20 acres in any one tract. The division between the open Marsh and swamp, which is more or less timber & extends from the S.W. Corner of the Township to the South east Corner of Section 12, surrounding the corners to Sec. 13. 14. 23. & 24. is an almost impenetrable swamp of Black alders(?) embracing about one Section of land. Timber on Swamp Tamarack & small Spruce(?) very thick. water from 6 to 20 inches deep, the marsh is covered with a light crop of grass, water from 12 to 40 inches deep, innumerable small Islands(?) interspered over this Town, the margins of which abound with Cranberries.

The Town of Cranmoor was established in 1903, taking its name from the community of Cranmoor.

== Demographics ==
As of the census of 2000, there were 175 people, 66 households, and 48 families residing in the town. The population density was 4.8 people per square mile (1.8/km^{2}). There were 75 housing units at an average density of 2 per square mile (0.8/km^{2}). The racial makeup of the town was 85.14% White, 10.29% Native American, 0.57% Asian, 2.86% from other races, and 1.14% from two or more races. Hispanic or Latino people of any race were 3.43% of the population.

There were 66 households, out of which 31.8% had children under the age of 18 living with them, 66.7% were married couples living together, 3.0% had a female householder with no husband present, and 25.8% were non-families. 21.2% of all households were made up of individuals, and 10.6% had someone living alone who was 65 years of age or older. The average household size was 2.65 and the average family size was 3.04.

In the town, the population was spread out, with 26.3% under the age of 18, 8% from 18 to 24, 29.1% from 25 to 44, 22.9% from 45 to 64, and 13.7% who were 65 years of age or older. The median age was 38 years. For every 100 females, there were 103.5 males. For every 100 females age 18 and over, there were 101.6 males.

The median income for a household in the town was $46,250, and the median income for a family was $53,500. Males had a median income of $29,688 versus $24,375 for females. The per capita income for the town was $28,727. About 5.8% of families and 10.8% of the population were below the poverty line, including 13.8% of those under the age of 18 and none of those 65 or over.
