= Dexter, Wisconsin =

Town of Dexter, Wisconsin
- Town
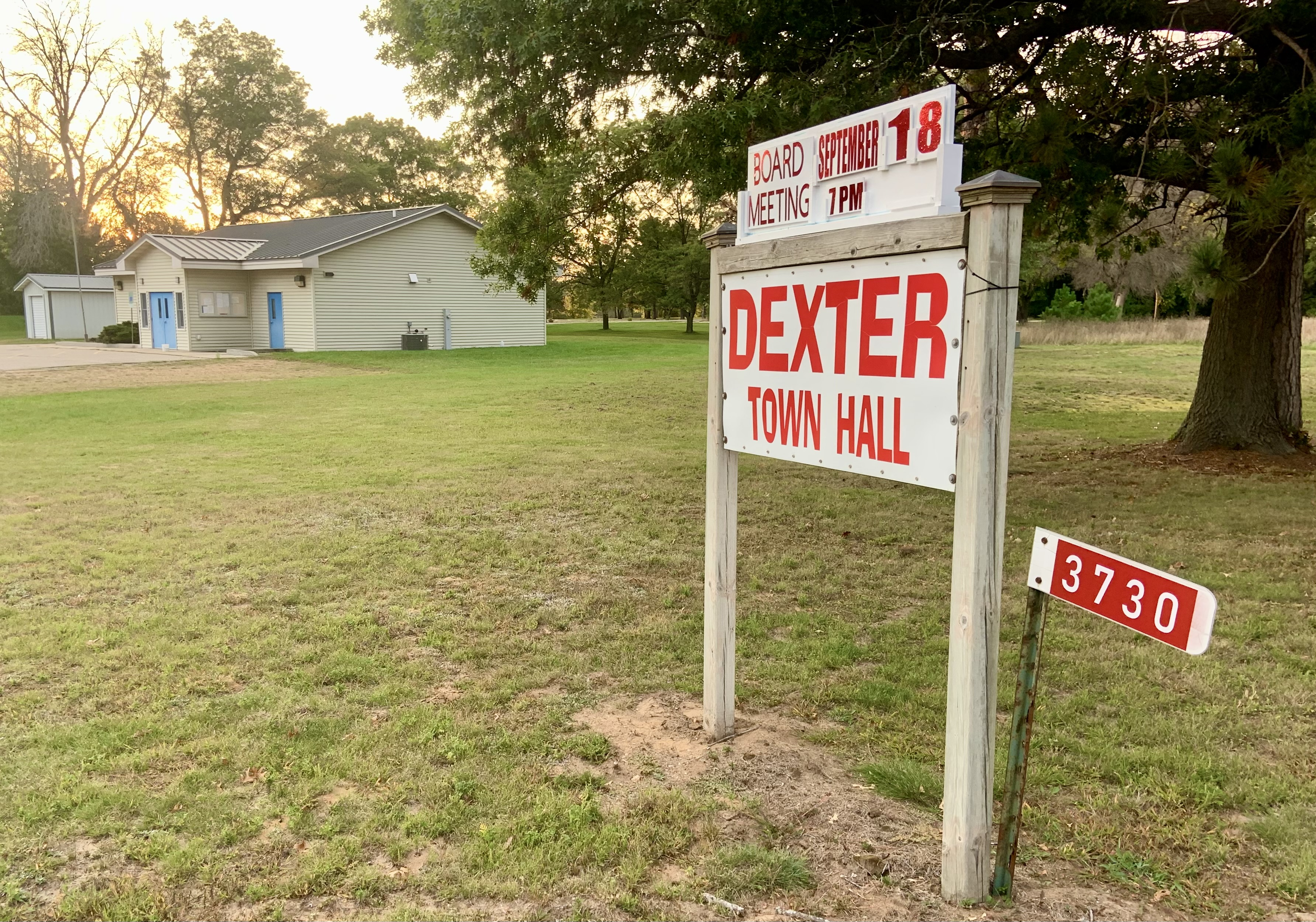
- Town hall

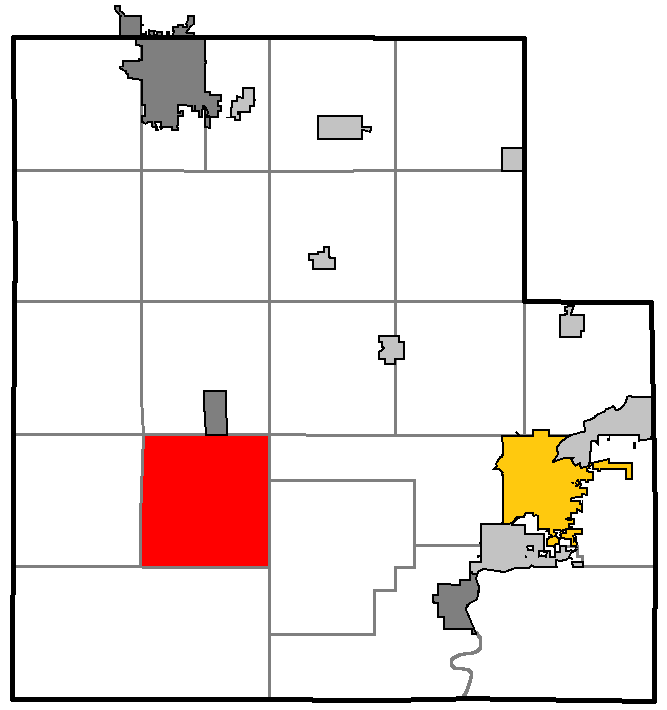
- Location of the Town of Dexter, Wood County

- Location of Wood County, Wisconsin
- Coordinates: 44°22′40″N 90°9′4″W
- Country: United States
- State: Wisconsin
- County: Wood

Area
  - Total: 35.5 sq mi (92.0 km^{2})
  - Land: 34.2 sq mi (88.6 km^{2})
  - Water: 1.3 sq mi (3.4 km^{2})
- Elevation: 997 ft (304 m)

Population (2020)
  - Total: 350
  - Density: 10/sq mi (4.0/km^{2})
- Time zone: UTC-6 (Central (CST))
  - Summer (DST): UTC-5 (CDT)
- Area codes: 715 & 534
- FIPS code: 55-20075
- GNIS feature ID: 1583083
- PLSS township: T22N R3E
- Website: https://townofdexterwi.gov/

The Town of Dexter is located in Wood County, Wisconsin, United States. The population was 350 at the 2020 census. The unincorporated communities of Dexterville and Veedum are located in the town.

== Geography ==
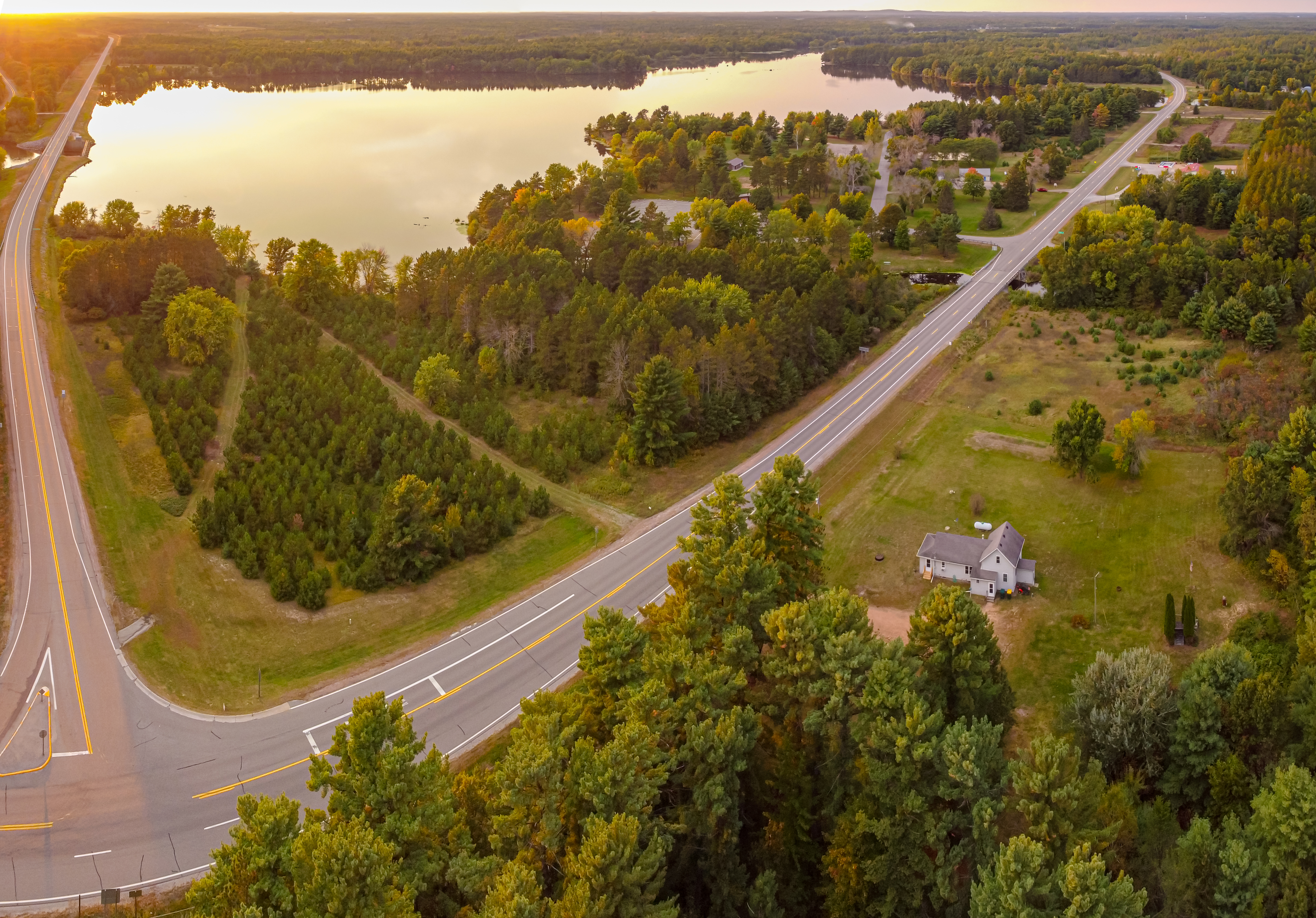
Dexterville

According to the United States Census Bureau, the town has a total area of 35.5 square miles (92.0 km^{2}), of which 34.2 square miles (88.6 km^{2}) is land and 1.3 square miles (3.4 km^{2}) (3.69%) is water.

== History ==
The outline of the six mile square that would become the town of Dexter was first surveyed in the summer of 1851 by a crew working for the U.S. government. In November and December another crew marked all the section corners of the six mile square, walking through the woods and wading the swamps, measuring with chain and compass. When done, the deputy surveyor filed this general description:

Surface level, and principally swamp (Tamarack) excepting a narrow strip about forty chains wide on either Bank of Yellow River and Sections 4. 5. 8. 9. 16, 17, and North half of 20. soil 2 rate Hard Pan. Timber on Sections 8. 9. 16. 17 1st rate Pine. The balance of the Township is covered with thick small Pine and Tamarack. with a very thick crop of underbrush(?) - Alder(?) Swamp Birch witch Hazel and small Pine. Hiles and Seal's Saw Mill and dweling situated on the South-west quarter of Section 14. Williams saw mill and dweling House situated about the center of Section 10.

The town of Dexter takes its name from the community of Dexterville.

== Demographics ==
As of the census of 2000, there were 379 people, 144 households, and 110 families residing in the town. The population density was 11.1 people per square mile (4.3/km^{2}). There were 190 housing units at an average density of 5.6 per square mile (2.1/km^{2}). The racial makeup of the town was 98.68% White, 0.26% African American, 0.79% Native American, and 0.26% from two or more races. Hispanic or Latino of any race were 0.26% of the population.

There were 144 households, out of which 32.6% had children under the age of 18 living with them, 66.0% were married couples living together, 3.5% had a female householder with no husband present, and 23.6% were non-families. 17.4% of all households were made up of individuals, and 9.7% had someone living alone who was 65 years of age or older. The average household size was 2.63 and the average family size was 3.02.

In the town, the population was spread out, with 25.3% under the age of 18, 6.1% from 18 to 24, 30.6% from 25 to 44, 26.1% from 45 to 64, and 11.9% who were 65 years of age or older. The median age was 39 years. For every 100 females, there were 115.3 males. For every 100 females age 18 and over, there were 114.4 males.

The median income for a household in the town was $43,750, and the median income for a family was $50,972. Males had a median income of $34,625 versus $22,321 for females. The per capita income for the town was $19,060. About 1.8% of families and 4.0% of the population were below the poverty line, including 4.5% of those under age 18 and 11.3% of those age 65 or over.
