= Eight Corners, Wisconsin =

- Unincorporated community
- Location within Wisconsin Location within the United States
- Coordinates: 44°28′04″N 89°55′31″W
- Country: United States
- State: Wisconsin
- County: Wood
- Elevation: 1,119 ft (341 m)
- Time zone: UTC-6 (Central (CST))
  - Summer (DST): UTC-5 (CDT)
- Area codes: 715 & 534
- GNIS feature ID: 1564469

Eight Corners is an unincorporated community in the town of Sigel, Wood County, Wisconsin, United States.

Eight Corners originally was built up at an eight-pointed intersection, hence the name.
