= Bakerville, Wisconsin =

- Unincorporated community
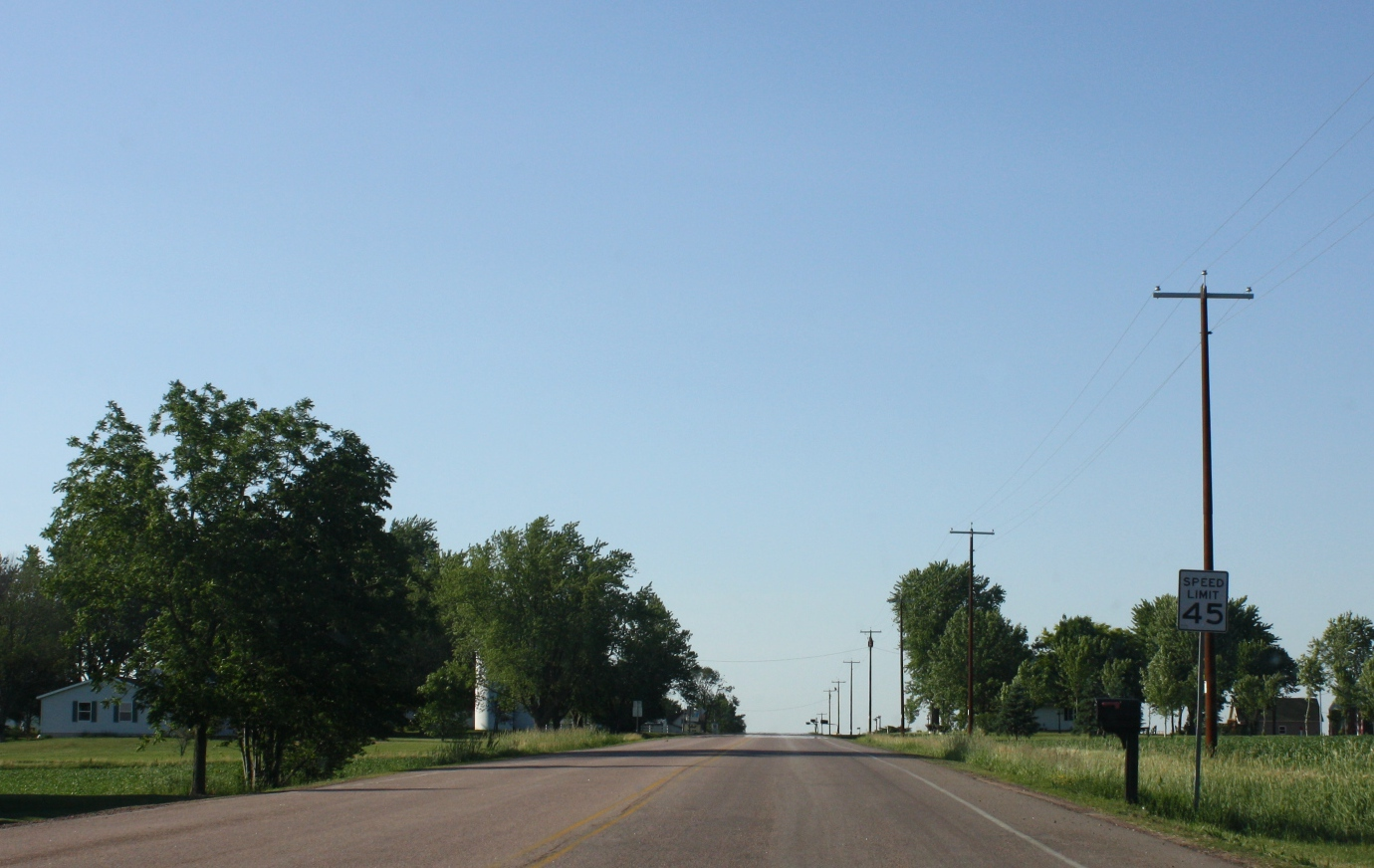
- Looking north

- Location within Wisconsin Location within the United States
- Coordinates: 44°37′38″N 90°13′05″W
- Country: United States
- State: Wisconsin
- County: Wood
- Elevation: 1,316 ft (401 m)
- Time zone: UTC-6 (Central (CST))
  - Summer (DST): UTC-5 (CDT)
- Area codes: 715 & 534
- GNIS feature ID: 1561114

Bakerville is an unincorporated community located in the town of Lincoln, Wood County, Wisconsin, United States. Bakerville is located at the junction of County Highways B and BB, 3.5 miles (5.6 km) southwest of Marshfield.

== History ==
A post office was in operation at Bakerville from 1879 until 1900. The community was named after James H. Baker, a local landowner.

== Images ==
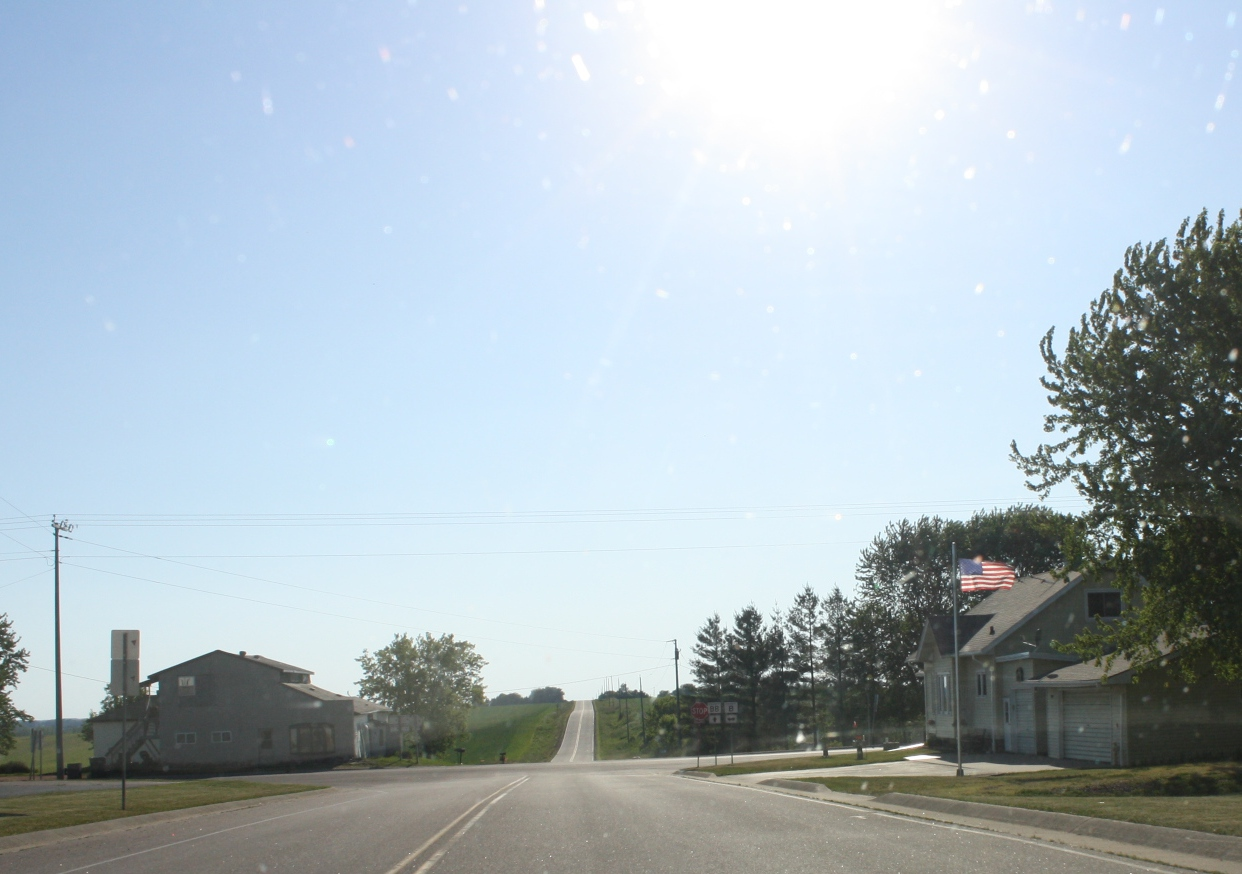
Looking west

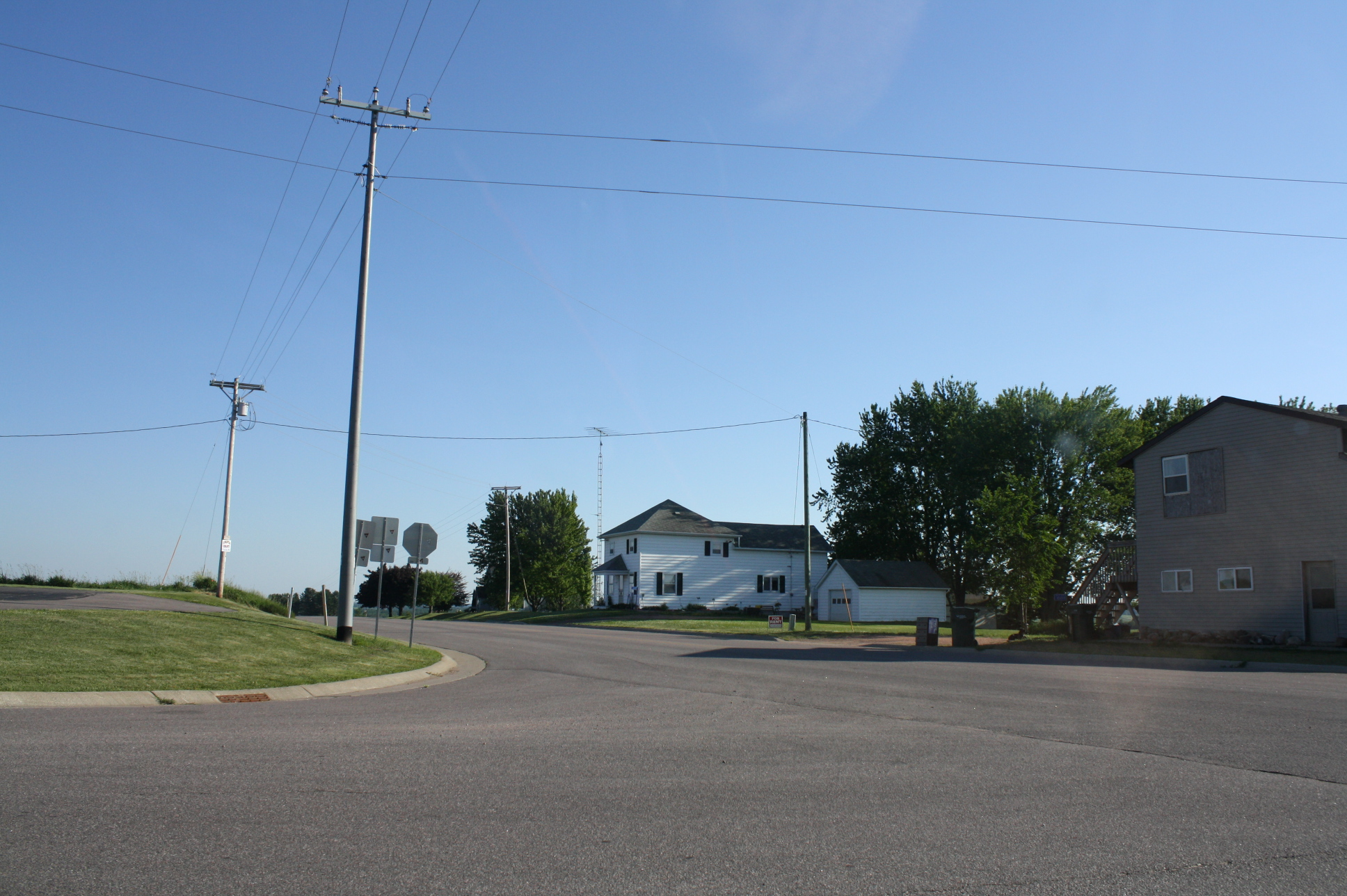
Looking south
