= Spencer M. Marsh =

American politician

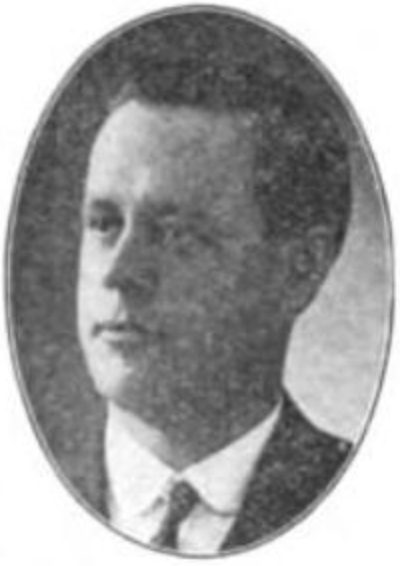

Member of the Wisconsin Senate from the 25th district
- In office 1907–1911

Personal details
- Born: Spencer Milton Marsh; July 26, 1864 Grant, Clark County, Wisconsin
- Died: October 11, 1932 (aged 68) San Diego, California
- Occupation: Lawyer, politician

Spencer Milton Marsh (July 26, 1864 – October 11, 1932) was an American jurist and legislator.

== Biography ==
Marsh served as a Republican member of the Wisconsin Senate, representing the 25th District. He was elected in 1906, receiving 9,507 votes against 7,478 votes for rival W. W. Albers.

He was born and raised on a farm in Clark County, Wisconsin in 1864. He attended the state Normal School at River Falls in 1882 and 1883. He later studied law in 1885, and was admitted to the bar association in 1885. He became a law partner of the firm O'Neill and Marsh with James O'Neill Their partnership continued until O'Neill became a Wisconsin Circuit Court judge in 1898. He later continued the practice of law with the firm Marsh and Tucker, and then Marsh and Schoengarth.

He served as the district attorney for Clark County for two terms, having been elected to the Republican ticket in 1898 and 1900. He was also the president of the Commercial State Bank at Neillsville, when it was organized in 1898.

In 1914, Marsh moved to San Diego, California. He served as District Attorney for San Diego County, California and in 1917 served as San Diego County Superior Court judge. Marsh died on October 11, 1932, in San Diego, California.
