= Cranmoor (community), Wisconsin =

Cranmoor, Wisconsin
- Unincorporated community
- Location within Wisconsin Location within the United States
- Coordinates: 44°18′53″N 90°01′58″W
- Country: United States
- State: Wisconsin
- County: Wood
- Elevation: 981 ft (299 m)
- Time zone: UTC-6 (Central (CST))
  - Summer (DST): UTC-5 (CDT)
- Area codes: 715 & 534
- GNIS feature ID: 1577559

Cranmoor is an unincorporated community located in the town of Cranmoor, Wood County, Wisconsin, United States.

The name "Cranmoor", a portmanteau of cranberry and moor, was adopted in 1898 for the community's role as a trading center of cranberries. A post office was established at Cranmoor in 1898, and remained in operation until 1932.
