= Sigel, Wood County, Wisconsin =

Town of Sigel, Wisconsin
- Town
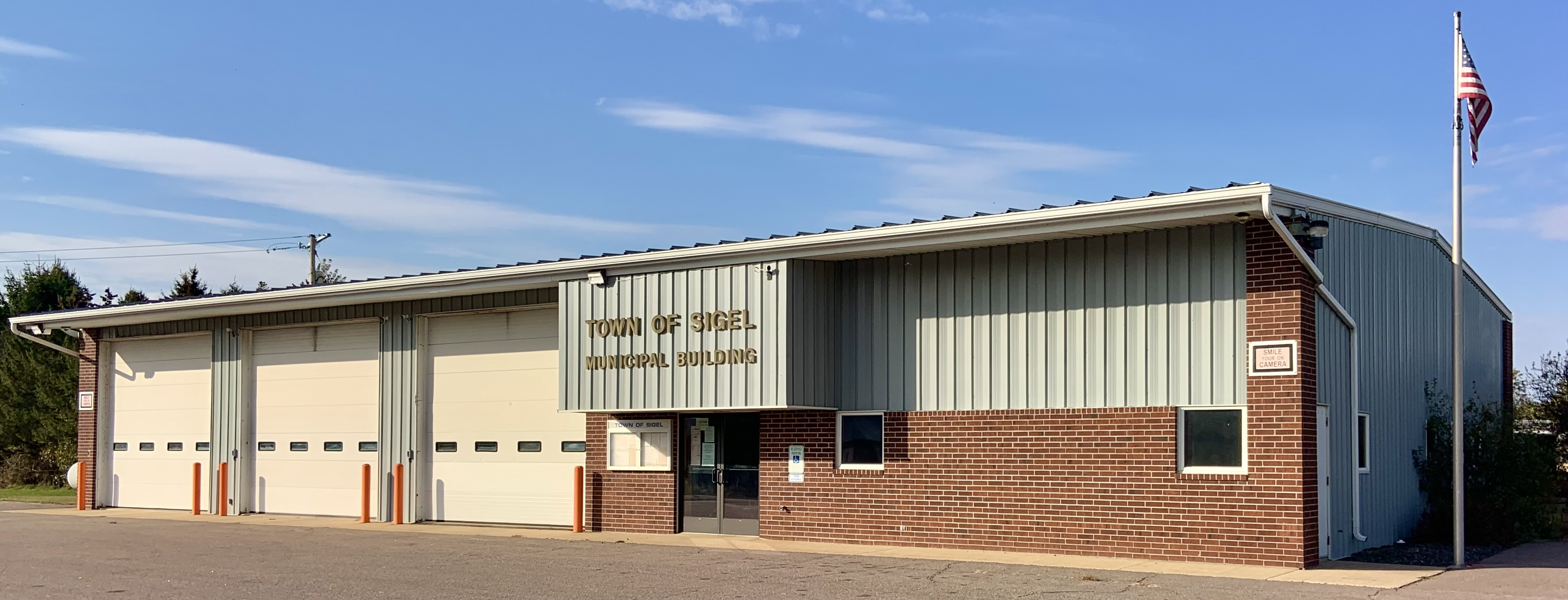
- Town hall

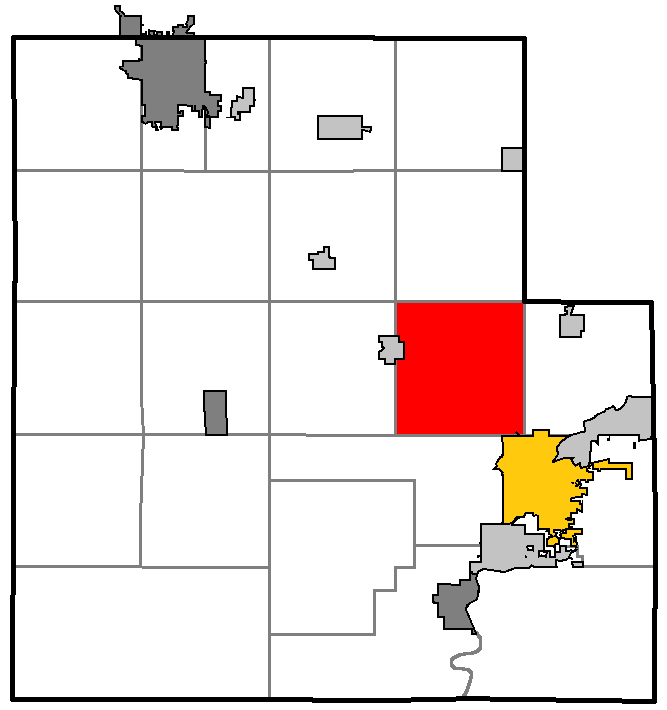
- Location of the Town of Sigel, Wood County, Wisconsin

- Location of Wood County, Wisconsin
- Coordinates: 44°28′5″N 89°54′5″W
- Country: United States
- State: Wisconsin
- County: Wood

Area
  - Total: 35.5 sq mi (92.0 km^{2})
  - Land: 35.5 sq mi (92.0 km^{2})
  - Water: 0 sq mi (0.0 km^{2})
- Elevation: 1,089 ft (332 m)

Population (2020)
  - Total: 1,017
  - Density: 28.6/sq mi (11.1/km^{2})
- Time zone: UTC-6 (Central (CST))
  - Summer (DST): UTC-5 (CDT)
- Area codes: 715 & 534
- FIPS code: 55-73900
- GNIS feature ID: 1584160
- PLSS township: T23N R5E
- Website: https://townofsigelwoodwi.gov/

Th Town of Sigel is located in Wood County, Wisconsin, United States. The population was 1,017 at the 2020 census. The unincorporated community of Eight Corners is located in the town.

== Geography ==
According to the United States Census Bureau, the town has a total area of 35.5 square miles (92.0 km^{2}), of which 35.5 square miles (92.0 km^{2}) is land and 0.03% is water.

== History ==
In 1839 a crew working for the U.S. government surveyed the south border of the six mile square that would become the town of Sigel. In June 1851 another crew surveyed the east side. That November another crew marked all the section corners, walking through the woods and wading the swamps, measuring with chain and compass. When done, the deputy surveyor filed this general description:

The character of this Township is good, particularly the North Eastern part there is some good farming Lands the timber being mostly Sugar Elm Ironwood + Birch the Southern + Western part is generally of a 2d rate quality the timber being mostly Birch Pine soft Maple Ash etc the streams are fed by the swamps & are not durable. there is some good scattering Pine mixed in with the Hard wood but no heavy Bodies of Pine were seen in this Township - the surface is generally level & somewhat stony. the stone being of reddish color

The town of Sigel was established in 1863, and named after Franz Sigel, an officer in the Civil War.

== Demographics ==
As of the census of 2000, there were 1,130 people, 410 households, and 334 families residing in the town. The population density was 31.8 people per square mile (12.3/km^{2}). There were 428 housing units at an average density of 12.0 per square mile (4.7/km^{2}). The racial makeup of the town was 99.29% White, 0.09% African American, 0.27% Native American, and 0.35% from two or more races. Hispanic or Latino of any race were 0.18% of the population.

There were 410 households, out of which 31.0% had children under the age of 18 living with them, 74.9% were married couples living together, 4.6% had a female householder with no husband present, and 18.3% were non-families. 14.4% of all households were made up of individuals, and 5.1% had someone living alone who was 65 years of age or older. The average household size was 2.76 and the average family size was 3.04.

In the town, the population was spread out, with 24.2% under the age of 18, 7.3% from 18 to 24, 26.2% from 25 to 44, 28.0% from 45 to 64, and 14.4% who were 65 years of age or older. The median age was 40 years. For every 100 females, there were 107.7 males. For every 100 females age 18 and over, there were 109.0 males.

The median income for a household in the town was $49,226, and the median income for a family was $53,542. Males had a median income of $37,778 versus $26,429 for females. The per capita income for the town was $19,676. About 1.2% of families and 2.0% of the population were below the poverty line, including 0.8% of those under age 18 and 4.1% of those age 65 or over.
