= Lincoln, Wood County, Wisconsin =

Lincoln, Wisconsin
- Town
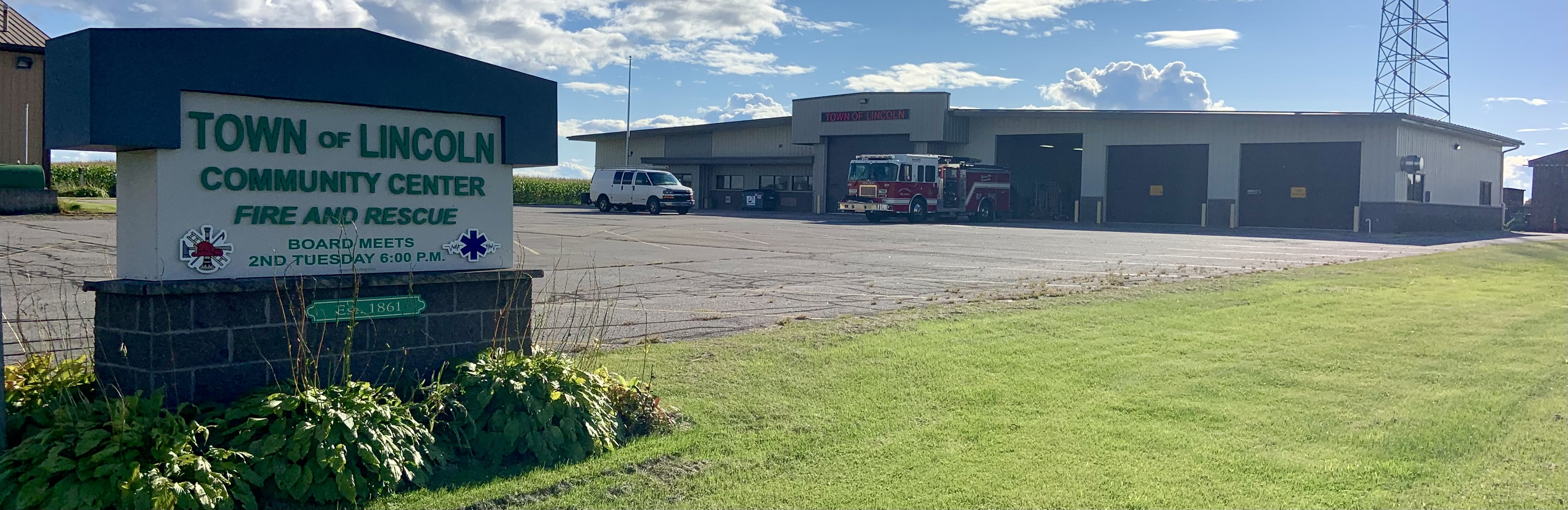
- Town hall

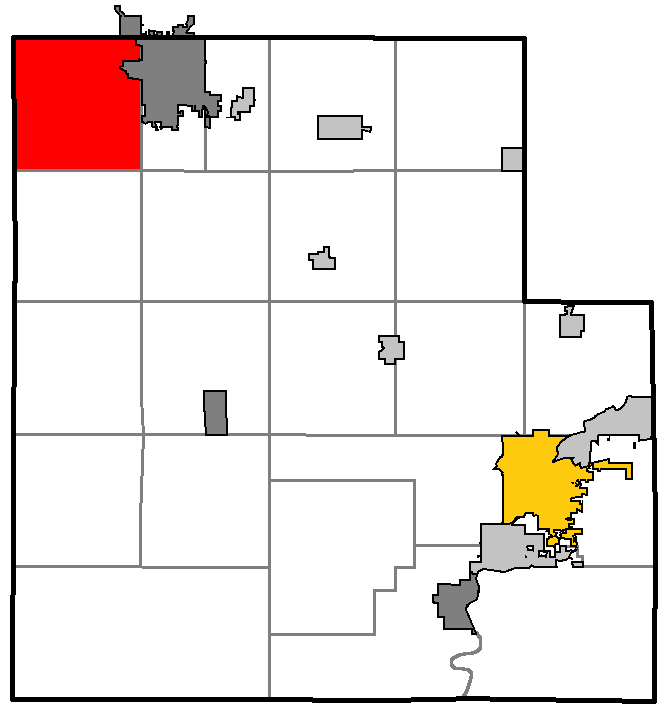
- Location of Lincoln, Wood County, Wisconsin

- Location of Wood County, Wisconsin
- Coordinates: 44°38′43″N 90°14′43″W
- Country: United States
- State: Wisconsin
- County: Wood

Area
  - Total: 34.2 sq mi (88.7 km^{2})
  - Land: 34.2 sq mi (88.6 km^{2})
  - Water: 0 sq mi (0 km^{2})
- Elevation: 1,191 ft (363 m)

Population (2020)
  - Total: 1,593
  - Density: 46.6/sq mi (18.0/km^{2})
- Time zone: UTC-6 (Central (CST))
  - Summer (DST): UTC-5 (CDT)
- Area codes: 715 & 534
- FIPS code: 55-44550
- GNIS feature ID: 1583571
- PLSS township: T25N R2E
- Website: https://tn.lincoln-wood.wi.gov/

Lincoln is a town in Wood County, Wisconsin, United States. The population was 1,593 at the 2020 census. The unincorporated community of Bakerville is located in the town.

== Geography ==
According to the United States Census Bureau, the town has a total area of 34.2 square miles (88.7 km^{2}), of which 34.2 square miles (88.6 km^{2}) is land and 0.03% is water.

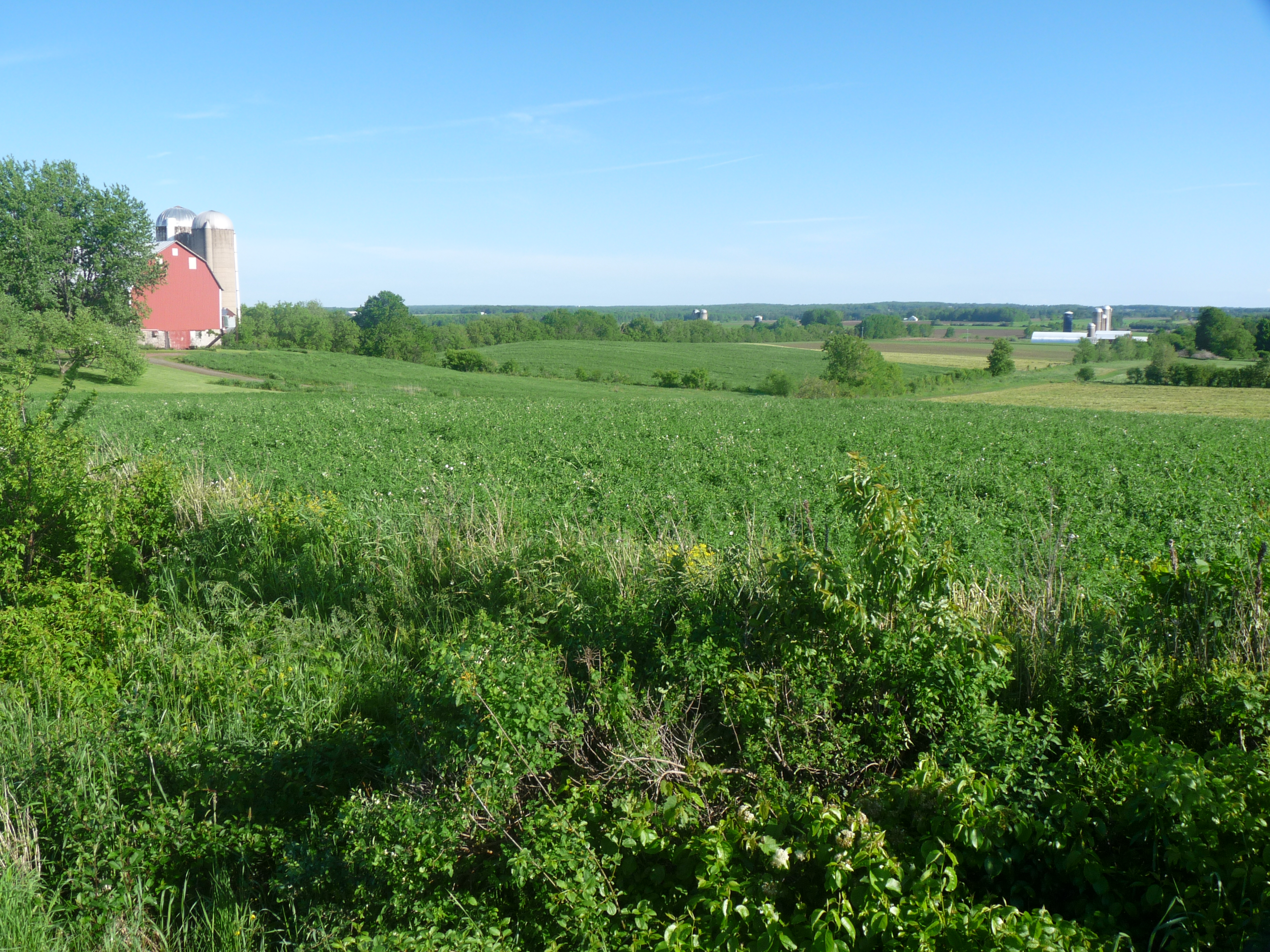
From the moraine near Bakerville, looking northwest across Lincoln

Geologists call the prominent range of hills running from Marshfield to Bakerville through Nasonville the "Marshfield moraine". It is probably a terminal moraine left where a continental glacier stopped advancing long ago. The rest of the town is flatter. The section northwest of the moraine is heavy clay soil on the till plain left by that glacier, with sandstone and granite beneath.

== History ==
The outline of the six mile square that would become Lincoln was first surveyed in the summer of 1851 by a crew working for the U.S. government. In November and December 1853 another crew marked its section corners, walking through the woods and wading the streams, measuring with chain and compass. When done, the deputy surveyor filed this general description:

This Township contains much good land and is clear from swamp The greater part of it is Rolling and good 2d Rate land. It is well watered and some of the streams are of sufficient size for Milling purposes The streams are all lined with good W P(?) which is the prevailing Timber. The upland is mostly Sugar & Lind.

Lincoln Township was established as "Johnson Township" in March 1868. A few months later in June 1868, the township was renamed for President Abraham Lincoln.

== Demographics ==
As of the census of 2000, there were 1,554 people, 539 households, and 433 families residing in the town. The population density was 45.4 people per square mile (17.5/km^{2}). There were 551 housing units at an average density of 16.1 per square mile (6.2/km^{2}). The racial makeup of the town was 98.71% White, 0.06% African American, 0.77% Asian, 0.06% from other races, and 0.39% from two or more races. Hispanic or Latino people of any race were 0.32% of the population.

There were 539 households, out of which 40.6% had children under the age of 18 living with them, 74.6% were married couples living together, 3% had a female householder with no husband present, and 19.5% were non-families. 15.2% of all households were made up of individuals, and 6.7% had someone living alone who was 65 years of age or older. The average household size was 2.88 and the average family size was 3.24.

In the town, the population was spread out, with 30.2% under the age of 18, 6.6% from 18 to 24, 28.3% from 25 to 44, 24.8% from 45 to 64, and 10% who were 65 years of age or older. The median age was 38 years. For every 100 females, there were 112 males. For every 100 females age 18 and over, there were 106.5 males.

The median income for a household in the town was $53,194, and the median income for a family was $59,904. Males had a median income of $37,019 versus $23,750 for females. The per capita income for the town was $27,617. About 2.3% of families and 3.8% of the population were below the poverty line, including 3.1% of those under age 18 and 7.9% of those age 65 or over.
