= Maple Works, Wisconsin =

Defunct hamlet in the town of Grant, Clark County, Wisconsin, United States

Coordinates: 44°35′47″N 90°27′23″W

Maple Works (also called Mapleworks) was a hamlet in the town of Grant, Clark County, Wisconsin, United States. At one time it was a busy rural center with two stores, a saloon, a post office and several residences. According to the tables contained in the 1895 The New 11 x 14 Atlas of the World (New York:Rand McNally Corporation, 1895), Maple Works had a population of 62, but it no longer has residents.

There is now a Mennonite Church at one of the corners and the nearby settlement of Granton has a small diner named after the settlement on the northern end of the village. The Windfall Cemetery is located a few blocks south of the Church on Romadka Road.

== History ==
Maple Works was located a half mile east of the village of Granton at the corner of Fremont and Romandka Roads. In 1857, Nelson Marsh from Pennsylvania settled in the area, coming with an ox team by way of Sparta and cutting a temporary road through the forest. He established a farm and tavern which served as a stagecoach stopping place on the old stage route from Neillsville to Stevens Point which was established in 1858. Marsh was the first postmaster of Maple Works, serving in that capacity until the post office was abolished in the 1890s. The name was initially intended to be Maplewood, but because of unclear handwriting the application for a post office was interpreted as Mapleworks and so remained. When Granton was established in 1890, many buildings were moved from Mapleworks to the new village.
