= Birch Bluff =

Coordinates: 44.2919074°N 90.3115222°W

Birch Bluff is a summit in the U.S. state of Wisconsin. The elevation is 1,037 feet (316 m).

Birch Bluff was so named for the abundant birch timber in the area.
