= Wood County, Wisconsin =

County in Wisconsin, United States

- County
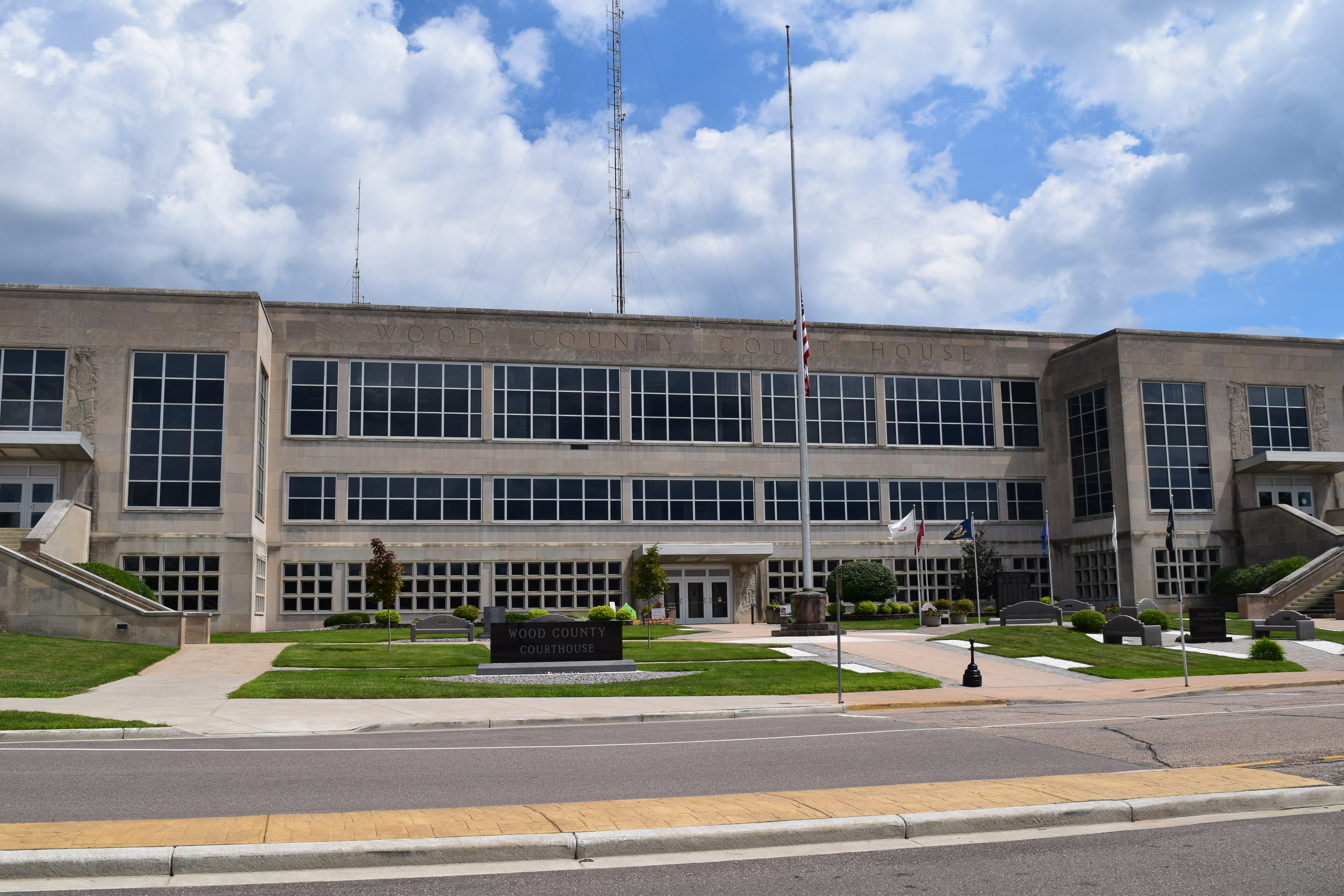
- Wood County Courthouse

- Location within the U.S. state of Wisconsin
- Coordinates: 44°27′N 90°02′W
- Country: United States
- State: Wisconsin
- Founded: 1856
- Named for: Joseph Wood
- Seat: Wisconsin Rapids
- Largest city: Marshfield

Area
  - Total: 809 sq mi (2,100 km^{2})
  - Land: 793 sq mi (2,050 km^{2})
  - Water: 16 sq mi (41 km^{2}) 2.0%

Population (2020)
  - Total: 74,207
  - Estimate (2025): 74,060 ▼
  - Density: 93.6/sq mi (36.1/km^{2})
- Time zone: UTC−6 (Central)
  - Summer (DST): UTC−5 (CDT)
- Congressional districts: 3rd, 7th
- Website: www.woodcountywi.gov

Wood County is a county located in the U.S. state of Wisconsin. As of the 2020 census, the population was 74,207. Its county seat is Wisconsin Rapids. The county is named after Joseph Wood, a member of the Wisconsin State Assembly. Wood County comprises the Wisconsin Rapids–Marshfield, WI Micropolitan Statistical Area and is included in the Wausau–Stevens Point–Wisconsin Rapids, WI Combined Statistical Area.

== Geography ==
According to the U.S. Census Bureau, the county has a total area of 809 square miles (2,100 km^{2}), of which 793 square miles (2,050 km^{2}) is land and 16 square miles (41 km^{2}) (2.0%) is water. The geographic center of Wisconsin is in Wood County, 9 miles (14 km) southeast of Marshfield.

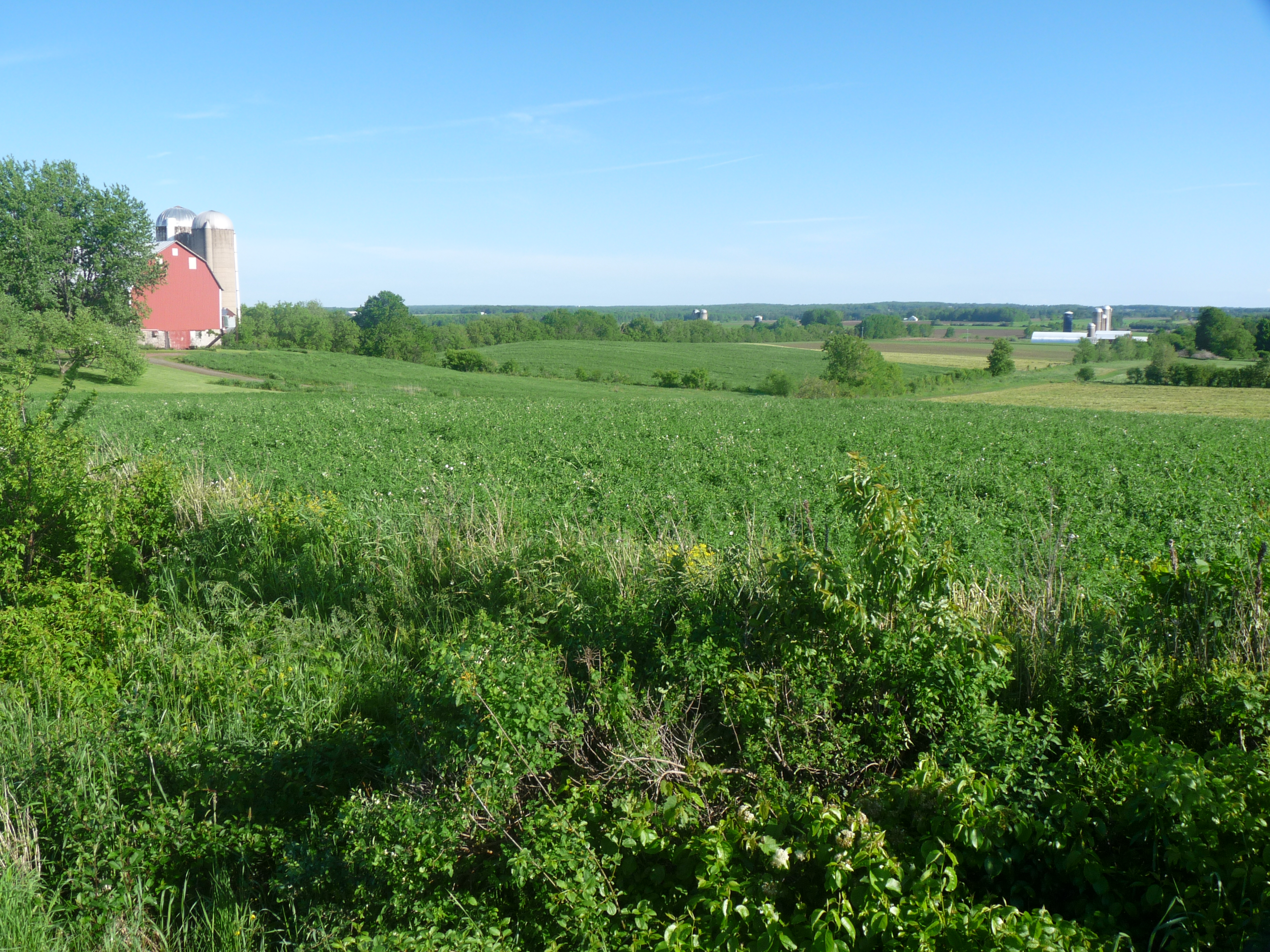
In the northwest corner of the county near Bakerville, facing northwest

Wood County spans two of Wisconsin's five geographical regions. The northern part of the county is in the Northern Highlands, with mostly rich cropland with heavy clay soil, used for corn, soybeans, hay and dairy. In the northwest corner the Marshfield moraine runs from Marathon County through Marshfield, Bakerville and Nasonville into Clark County. The south and central areas from Babcock through Cranmoor and Wisconsin Rapids are in the Central Plain, flat and marshy—one of the major cranberry-producing centers of the United States. The Wisconsin River cuts across the southeast corner, a corridor of sand flats, islands and oxbows. The river falls about 120 feet (37 m) as it flows through the county, driving several power dams (see Biron Flowage). The remainder of the county is drained by smaller streams and rivers, punctuated by isolated hills like Powers Bluff.

The flat, sandy southern third of the county was largely shaped by the last glacial advance. The ice did not reach Wood County, but it approached from the east into Portage County and butted up against the Baraboo Hills to the south. This blocked the Wisconsin River, damming it so that it backed up, forming Glacial Lake Wisconsin, a frigid lake that stretched from the Baraboo Hills north to the sites of Babcock and Wisconsin Rapids, submerging that part of the county. This area is generally flat and marshy now because meltwater rivers from the glacier and streams from land to the north carried sand and silt out into the glacial lake, where the sediment settled beneath its still waters. After the glacial dam melted enough to drain Glacial Lake Wisconsin around 13,000 years ago, the Wisconsin River cut new channels through the lake-bottom sands in the southeast corner of the county. In a later dry period, wind blew the sand into dunes. One dune in the town of Saratoga is eight meters thick. Later still, the area became wet and peat formed in places on top of the sand. The first surveyors in 1852 found a great marsh, like a Wisconsin Everglades. Here is their description of what is now Cranmoor:

"This Township is very nearly all covered either with Marsh or swamp there is not to exceed in the Township two Sections of land that would admit of cultivation... Timber on Swamp Tamarack & small Spruce(?) very thick. water from 6 to 20 inches (150 to 510 mm) deep, the marsh is covered with a light crop of grass, water from 12 to 40 inches deep, innumerable small Islands(?) interspered over this Town, the margins of which abound with Cranberries."

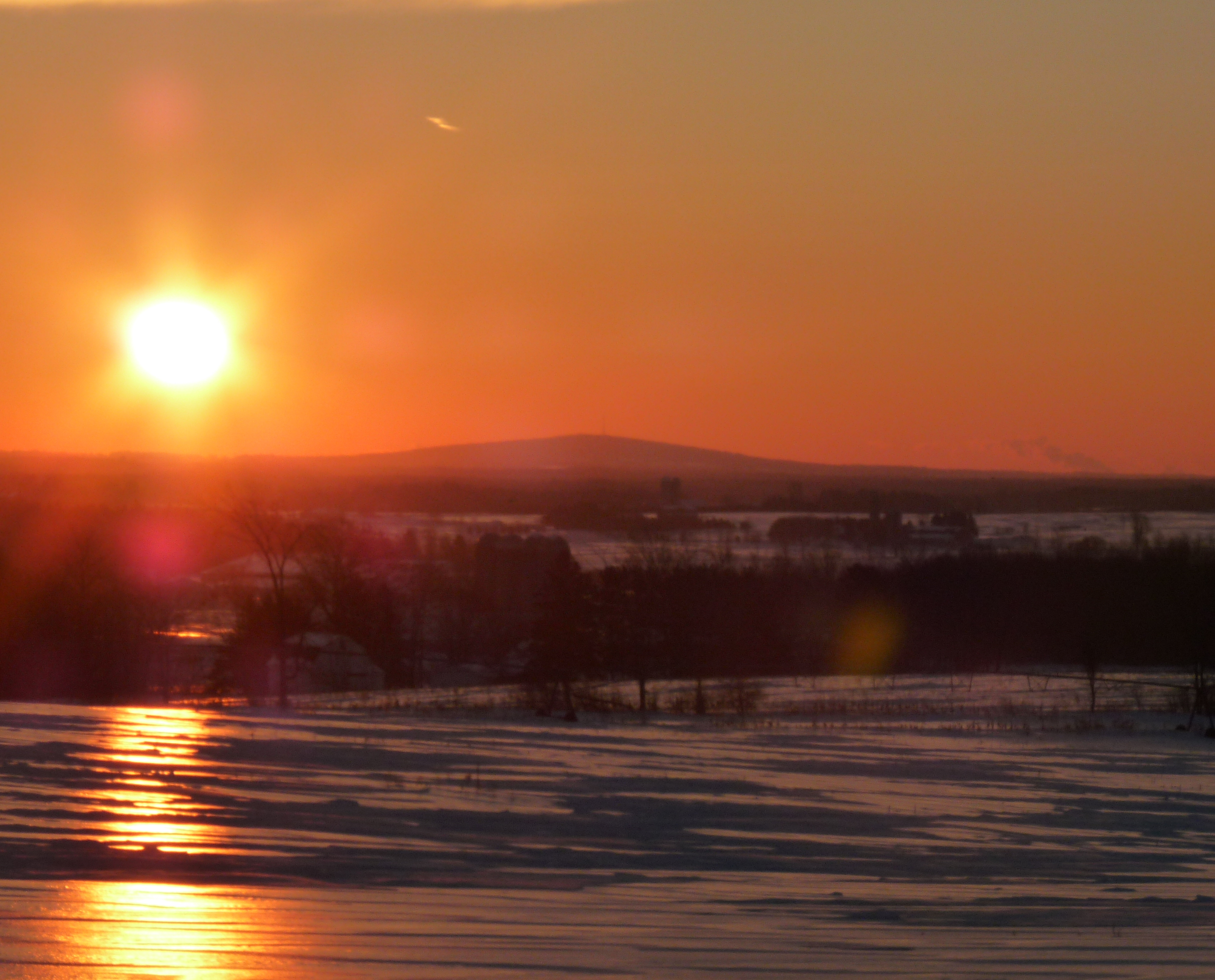
Looking southeast across Wood County from the Marshfield moraine at Nasonville, with Powers Bluff in the middle and a plume from a paper mill at Rapids or Nekoosa on the right, almost at the far end of the county.

The north of the county was shaped by earlier glaciers, which deposited glacial till, the basis for the heavy soil there. The Marshfield moraine in the northwest corner is probably a terminal moraine from one of these earlier glaciers, or from a series of them. Its age is unclear, but its relatively smooth surface indicates that it has eroded for a much longer time than the choppy terminal moraines left 13,000 years ago, like the Perkinstown moraine near Medford.

Much of the county except for the northeast corner is underlain by a layer of Cambrian sandstone, formed long before the last ice age. Most of the original sandstone layer has been eroded away and the remainder is usually buried under glacial till, but it can be seen in gravel pits and a few bluffs. The Lindsey bluffs (a.k.a. the Marshfield School Forest) and Birch Bluff and South Bluff in the Town of Remington are hard spots in this sandstone which have resisted erosion.

Powers Bluff is different from the sandstone bluffs, much older, with a hard core of Precambrian quartzite and a peak of chert. A marker on the bluff says it is a "worn down peak of an ancient mountain range which once covered northern Wisconsin."

=== Adjacent counties ===
- Marathon County – north
- Portage County – east
- Adams County – southeast
- Juneau County – south
- Jackson County – southwest
- Clark County – northwest

=== Natural wildlife refuges ===
- Mead Wildlife Area

== Demographics ==
Historical population
Census	Pop.	Note	%±
1860	2,425		—
1870	3,912		61.3%
1880	8,981		129.6%
1890	18,127		101.8%
1900	25,865		42.7%
1910	30,583		18.2%
1920	34,643		13.3%
1930	37,865		9.3%
1940	44,465		17.4%
1950	50,500		13.6%
1960	59,105		17.0%
1970	65,362		10.6%
1980	72,799		11.4%
1990	73,605		1.1%
2000	75,555		2.6%
2010	74,749		−1.1%
2020	74,207		−0.7%
2025 (est.)	74,060	▼	−0.2%
U.S. Decennial Census; 1790–1960 1900–1990; 1990–2000 2010 2020

=== Racial and ethnic composition ===
Wood County, Wisconsin – Racial and ethnic composition Note: the US Census treats Hispanic/Latino as an ethnic category. This table excludes Latinos from the racial categories and assigns them to a separate category. Hispanics/Latinos may be of any race.
Race / ethnicity (NH = Non-Hispanic)	Pop 1980	Pop 1990	Pop 2000	Pop 2010	Pop 2020	% 1980	% 1990	% 2000	% 2010	% 2020
White alone (NH)	71,818	71,961	72,438	70,177	67,055	98.65%	97.77%	95.87%	93.88%	90.36%
Black or African American alone (NH)	26	89	201	382	547	0.04%	0.12%	0.27%	0.51%	0.74%
Native American or Alaska Native alone (NH)	416	456	513	539	549	0.57%	0.62%	0.68%	0.72%	0.74%
Asian alone (NH)	214	698	1,220	1,304	1,382	0.29%	0.95%	1.61%	1.74%	1.86%
Native Hawaiian or Pacific Islander alone (NH)	x	x	5	8	29	x	x	0.01%	0.01%	0.04%
Other race alone (NH)	54	15	25	29	190	0.07%	0.02%	0.03%	0.04%	0.26%
Mixed race or Multiracial (NH)	x	x	444	630	2,079	x	x	0.59%	0.84%	2.80%
Hispanic or Latino (any race)	271	386	709	1,680	2,376	0.37%	0.52%	0.94%	2.25%	3.20%
Total	72,799	73,605	75,555	74,749	74,207	100.00%	100.00%	100.00%	100.00%	100.00%

=== 2020 census ===
As of the 2020 census, the county had a population of 74,207. The population density was 93.6 people per square mile (36.1 people/km^{2}). There were 34,549 housing units at an average density of 43.6 units per square mile (16.8 units/km^{2}).

The median age was 44.3 years. 21.1% of residents were under the age of 18 and 21.6% of residents were 65 years of age or older. For every 100 females there were 96.9 males, and for every 100 females age 18 and over there were 95.3 males age 18 and over.

The racial makeup of the county was 91.4% White, 0.8% Black or African American, 0.8% American Indian and Alaska Native, 1.9% Asian, <0.1% Native Hawaiian and Pacific Islander, 1.3% from some other race, and 3.8% from two or more races. Hispanic or Latino residents of any race comprised 3.2% of the population.

64.5% of residents lived in urban areas, while 35.5% lived in rural areas.

There were 32,238 households in the county, of which 24.7% had children under the age of 18 living in them. Of all households, 47.0% were married-couple households, 19.4% were households with a male householder and no spouse or partner present, and 25.6% were households with a female householder and no spouse or partner present. About 32.4% of all households were made up of individuals and 14.6% had someone living alone who was 65 years of age or older.

There were 34,549 housing units, of which 6.7% were vacant. Among occupied housing units, 71.6% were owner-occupied and 28.4% were renter-occupied. The homeowner vacancy rate was 1.2% and the rental vacancy rate was 7.5%.

2000 Census Age Pyramid for Wood County

=== 2000 census ===
As of the census of 2000, there were 75,555 people, 30,135 households, and 20,491 families residing in the county. The population density was 95 people per square mile (37 people/km^{2}). There were 31,691 housing units at an average density of 40 units per square mile (15 units/km^{2}). The racial makeup of the county was 96.43% White, 0.27% Black or African American, 0.70% Native American, 1.61% Asian, 0.01% Pacific Islander, 0.30% from other races, and 0.69% from two or more races. 0.94% of the population were Hispanic or Latino of any race. 50.8% were of German, 8.5% Polish, 6.2% Norwegian, 5.2% American and 5.1% Irish ancestry.

There were 30,135 households, out of which 32.20% had children under the age of 18 living with them, 56.70% were married couples living together, 8.00% had a female householder with no husband present, and 32.00% were non-families. 27.20% of all households were made up of individuals, and 11.40% had someone living alone who was 65 years of age or older. The average household size was 2.47 and the average family size was 3.01.

In the county, the population was spread out, with 25.70% under the age of 18, 7.70% from 18 to 24, 28.40% from 25 to 44, 22.90% from 45 to 64, and 15.30% who were 65 years of age or older. The median age was 38 years. For every 100 females there were 96.10 males. For every 100 females age 18 and over, there were 93.00 males.

In 2017, there were 843 births, giving a general fertility rate of 69.1 births per 1000 women aged 15–44, the 19th highest rate out of all 72 Wisconsin counties. Of these, 16 of the births occurred at home. Additionally, there were 59 reported induced abortions performed on women of Wood County residence in 2017, a figure higher than the records for the preceding four years.

== Transportation ==
=== Major highways ===
- U.S. Highway 10
- Highway 13 (Wisconsin)
- Highway 34 (Wisconsin)
- Highway 54 (Wisconsin)
- Highway 66 (Wisconsin)
- Highway 73 (Wisconsin)
- Highway 80 (Wisconsin)
- Highway 97 (Wisconsin)
- Highway 173 (Wisconsin)
- Highway 186 (Wisconsin)

=== Railroads ===
- Canadian National

=== Airports ===
- KMFI – Marshfield Municipal Airport
- KISW – South Wood County Airport

== Government ==
Wood County has a 19-member board of supervisors, each member representing a district.

== Communities ==
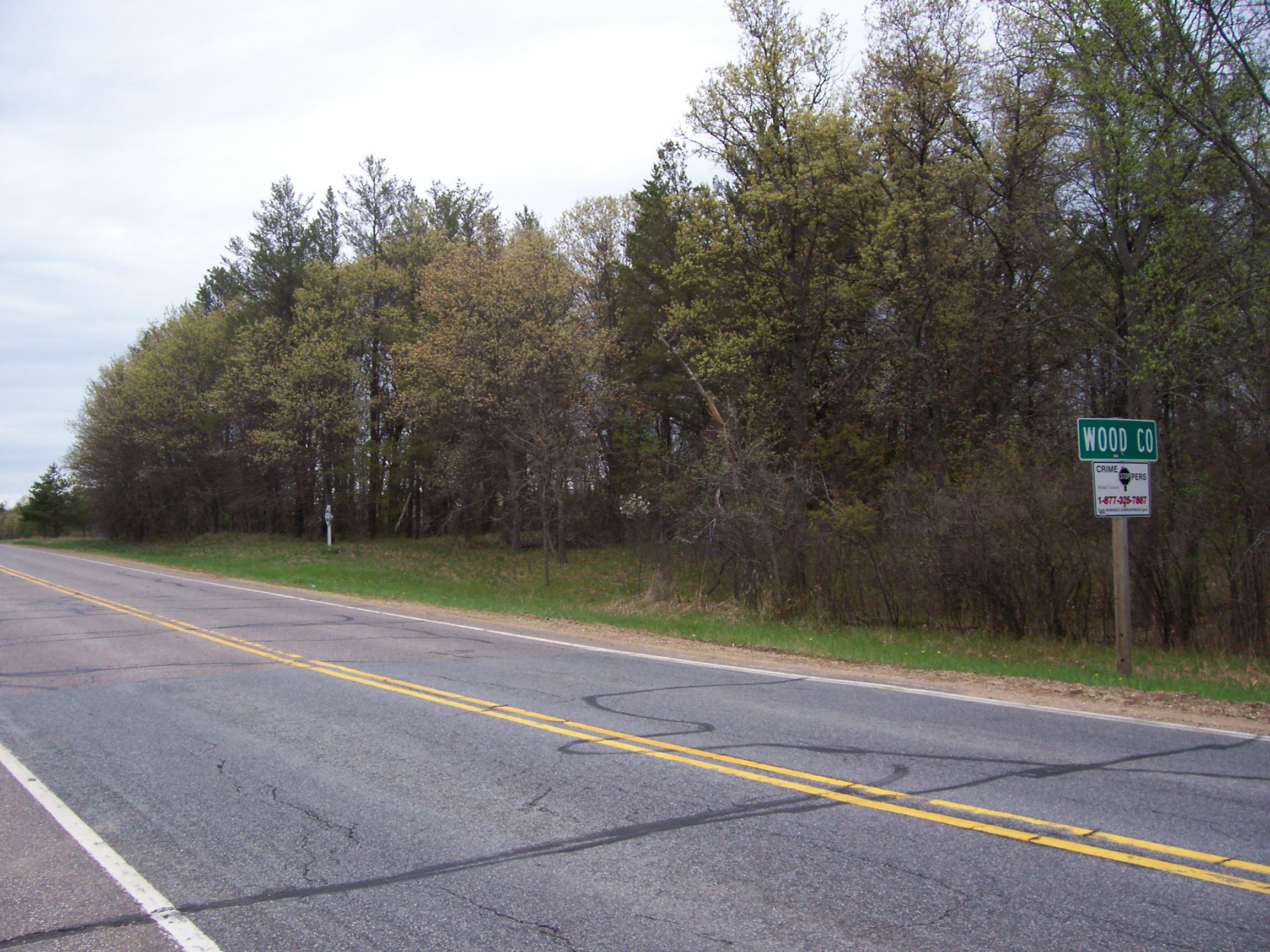
County line sign along the Wisconsin River

=== Cities ===
- Marshfield (partly in Marathon County)
- Nekoosa
- Pittsville
- Wisconsin Rapids (county seat)

=== Villages ===
- Arpin
- Auburndale
- Biron
- Hewitt
- Milladore (partly in Portage County)
- Port Edwards
- Rudolph
- Vesper

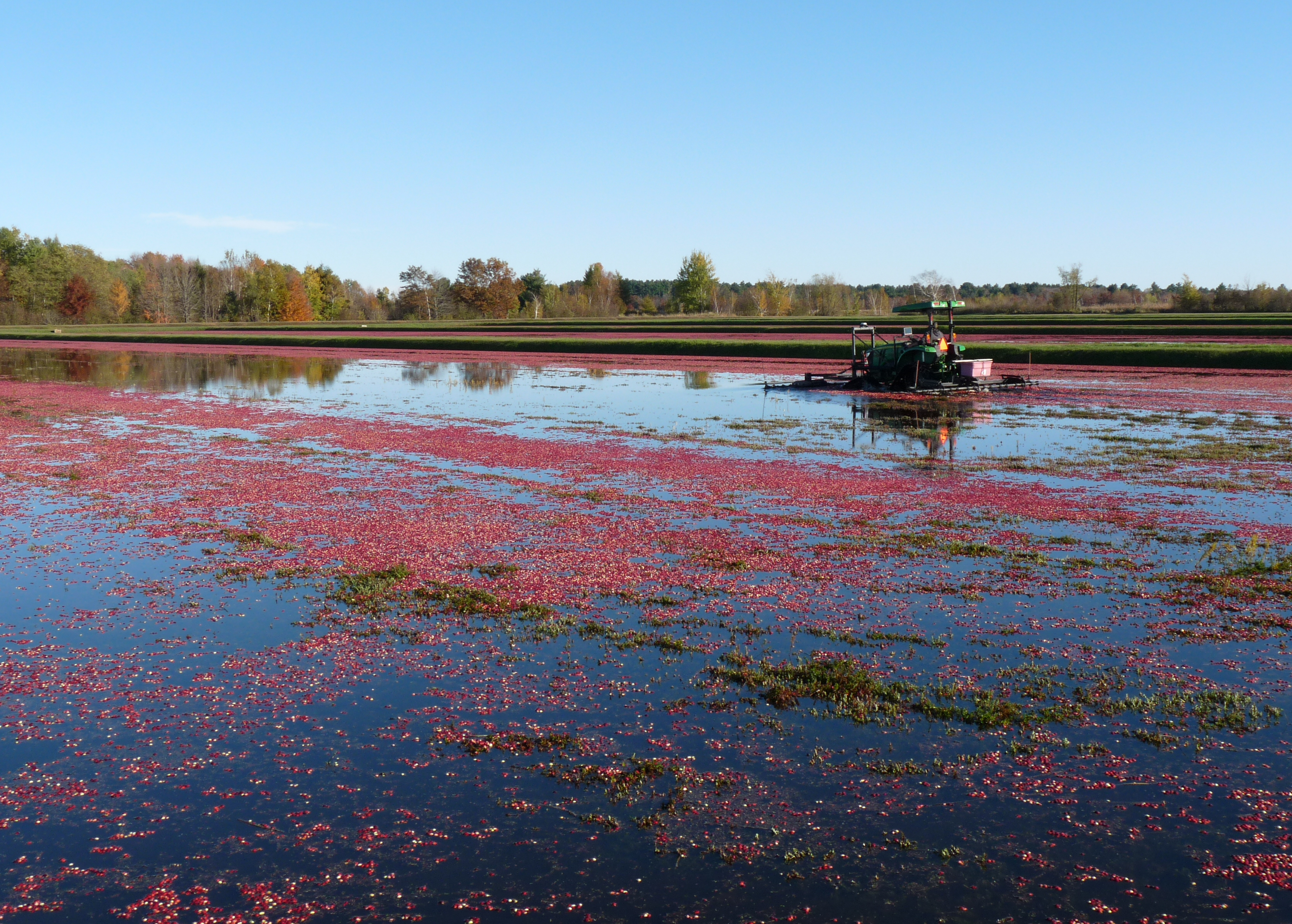
Harvesting cranberries in Cranmoor in October

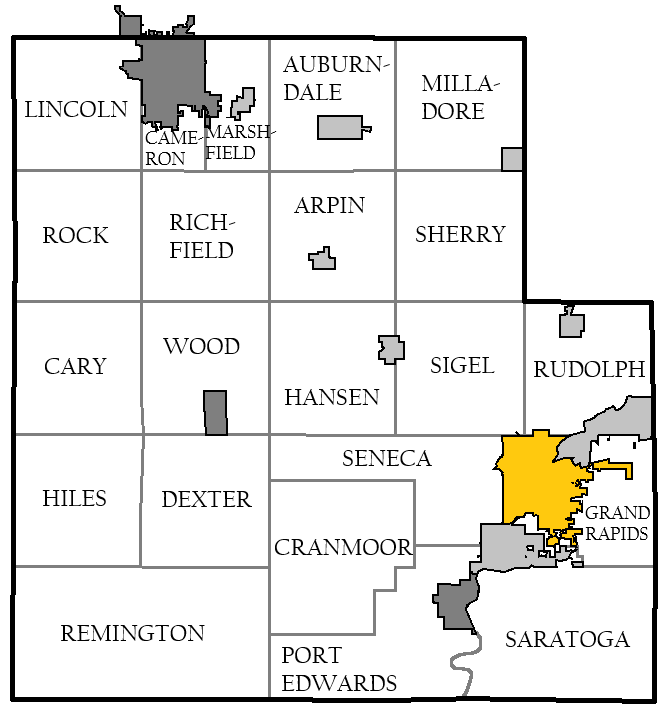
Towns of Wood County

=== Towns ===
- Arpin
- Auburndale
- Cameron
- Cary
- Cranmoor
- Dexter
- Grand Rapids
- Hansen
- Hiles
- Lincoln
- Marshfield
- Milladore
- Port Edwards
- Remington
- Richfield
- Rock
- Rudolph
- Saratoga
- Seneca
- Sherry
- Sigel
- Wood

=== Census-designated places ===
- Babcock
- Ceex Haci
- Lake Wazeecha

=== Unincorporated communities ===
- Altdorf
- Bakerville
- Bethel
- Blenker
- Cranmoor
- Dexterville
- Eight Corners
- Kellner (partial)
- Lindsey
- Nasonville
- Sherry
- Veedum
- Walker

== Politics ==
United States presidential election results for Wood County, Wisconsin
Year	Republican		Democratic		Third party(ies)	
Year	No.	%	No.	%	No.	%
1892	1,779	43.51%	2,220	54.29%	90	2.20%
1896	2,839	58.99%	1,877	39.00%	97	2.02%
1900	3,135	61.10%	1,878	36.60%	118	2.30%
1904	4,002	67.02%	1,673	28.02%	296	4.96%
1908	3,013	50.92%	2,498	42.22%	406	6.86%
1912	1,742	32.65%	2,523	47.28%	1,071	20.07%
1916	2,954	50.37%	2,625	44.76%	286	4.88%
1920	6,863	70.60%	1,051	10.81%	1,807	18.59%
1924	3,469	30.32%	548	4.79%	7,425	64.89%
1928	6,655	51.24%	6,167	47.48%	166	1.28%
1932	4,100	30.10%	9,215	67.65%	306	2.25%
1936	4,902	30.73%	9,982	62.57%	1,069	6.70%
1940	9,654	52.46%	8,574	46.59%	174	0.95%
1944	9,569	57.92%	6,861	41.53%	90	0.54%
1948	8,073	49.69%	7,999	49.23%	175	1.08%
1952	14,707	67.62%	6,914	31.79%	128	0.59%
1956	15,091	69.92%	6,412	29.71%	80	0.37%
1960	14,414	57.82%	10,483	42.05%	33	0.13%
1964	8,388	35.26%	15,378	64.65%	21	0.09%
1968	11,795	48.29%	10,921	44.71%	1,711	7.00%
1972	14,806	54.88%	10,415	38.60%	1,759	6.52%
1976	15,479	50.00%	14,728	47.58%	750	2.42%
1980	17,987	52.19%	13,804	40.05%	2,676	7.76%
1984	20,525	62.42%	12,118	36.85%	239	0.73%
1988	16,549	50.38%	16,074	48.93%	225	0.68%
1992	13,843	37.99%	13,208	36.25%	9,385	25.76%
1996	12,666	38.97%	14,650	45.08%	5,184	15.95%
2000	17,803	49.78%	15,936	44.56%	2,022	5.65%
2004	20,592	51.39%	18,950	47.29%	529	1.32%
2008	16,581	42.46%	21,710	55.59%	761	1.95%
2012	19,704	50.65%	18,581	47.77%	615	1.58%
2016	21,498	56.85%	14,225	37.61%	2,095	5.54%
2020	24,308	58.86%	16,365	39.63%	625	1.51%
2024	24,997	59.21%	16,599	39.32%	620	1.47%

Wood County voted Republican in presidential elections from 1940 to 1992, the only exception being Lyndon B. Johnson in 1964. The county became competitive between 1988 and 2012, during which time Wisconsin as a whole voted Democratic in every presidential race. In 1996, Bill Clinton ended a 28-year Republican streak in the county, taking 45.1% of the vote compared to Bob Dole's 39%, while the county gave 55% to Barack Obama in 2008. Since Donald Trump's 2016 win, in which Wood County gave him 56% of their votes, the county has reverted to its previous status as a more Republican county, as no Democratic presidential candidate has won more than 40% of the vote in the county since 2012.

== See also ==
- National Register of Historic Places listings in Wood County, Wisconsin
