= Rock, Wood County, Wisconsin =

Town of Rock, Wisconsin
- Town
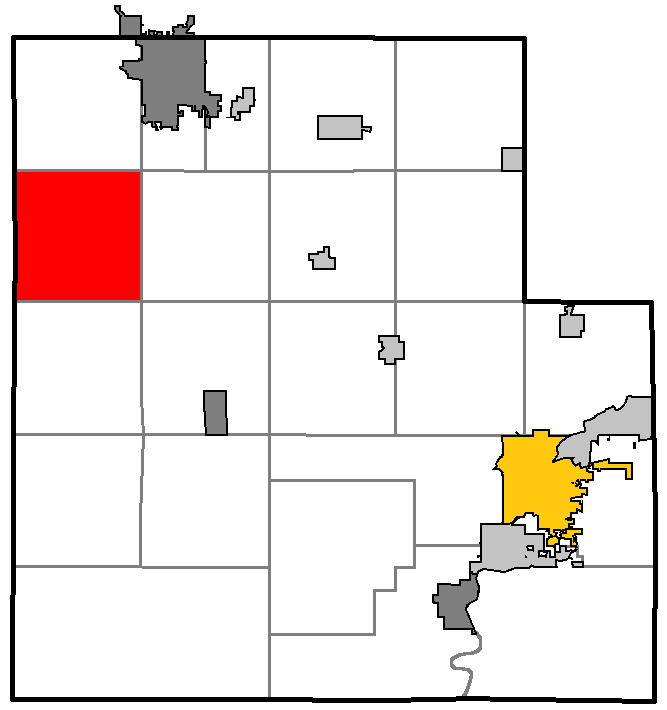
- Location of the Town of Rock, Wood County, Wisconsin

- Location of Wood County, Wisconsin
- Coordinates: 44°32′55″N 90°14′56″W
- Country: United States
- State: Wisconsin
- County: Wood

Area
  - Total: 34.6 sq mi (89.5 km^{2})
  - Land: 34.5 sq mi (89.4 km^{2})
  - Water: 0.039 sq mi (0.1 km^{2})
- Elevation: 1,158 ft (353 m)

Population (2020)
  - Total: 787
  - Density: 22.8/sq mi (8.80/km^{2})
- Time zone: UTC-6 (Central (CST))
  - Summer (DST): UTC-5 (CDT)
- Area codes: 715 & 534
- FIPS code: 55-68625
- GNIS feature ID: 1584049
- PLSS township: T24N R2E
- Website: https://www.townofrock.com/

The Town of Rock is located in Wood County, Wisconsin, United States. The population was 787 at the 2020 census. The unincorporated communities of Lindsey and Nasonville are located in the town.

== Geography ==
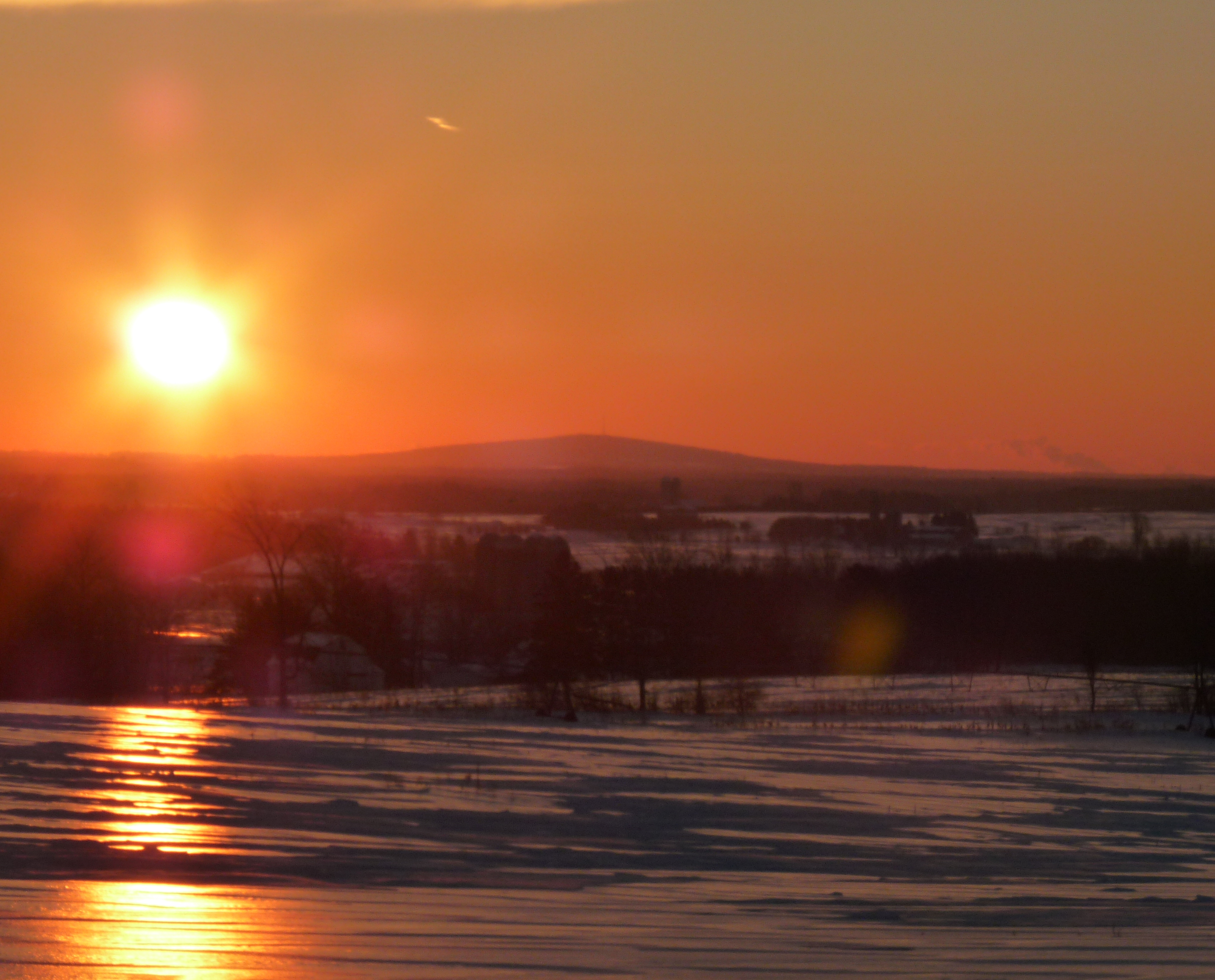
Looking southeast across Rock from the Nasonville ridge

According to the United States Census Bureau, the town has a total area of 34.5 square miles (89.5 km^{2}), of which 34.5 square miles (89.4 km^{2}) is land and 0.04 square miles (0.1 km^{2}) (0.12%) is water.

== History ==
The outline of the six-mile square that would become the town of Rock was first surveyed in the summer of 1851 by a crew working for the U.S. government. That fall another crew marked all the section corners of the six mile squares, walking through the woods and wading the swamps, measuring with chain and compass. When done, the deputy surveyor filed this general description:

The general character of this Township is 2d & 3d rate the soil is mostly poor loam & sand, the timber is mostly Birch Oak Aspen TamaracK & Pine the Pine is 2d growth & very poor. It is subject to fires(?) and If attended to would eventually alter the kinds of Timber to Oak as in places It can be distinctly seen where the fire has been the most severe. The streams are not durable being fed by the swamps the surface is generally level & somewhat stony The stone being a sandstone of a reddish color.

The Town of Rock was established in 1878.

== Demographics ==
As of the census of 2000, there were 856 people, 291 households, and 238 families residing in the town. The population density was 24.8 people per square mile (9.6/km^{2}). There were 316 housing units at an average density of 9.2 per square mile (3.5/km^{2}). The racial makeup of the town was 99.65% White, 0.12% Asian, 0.12% from other races, and 0.12% from two or more races. Hispanic or Latino of any race were 0.23% of the population.

There were 291 households, out of which 43.3% had children under the age of 18 living with them, 74.6% were married couples living together, 3.1% had a female householder with no husband present, and 17.9% were non-families. 13.7% of all households were made up of individuals, and 6.2% had someone living alone who was 65 years of age or older. The average household size was 2.94 and the average family size was 3.26.

In the town, the population was spread out, with 28.7% under the age of 18, 6.5% from 18 to 24, 30.5% from 25 to 44, 24.6% from 45 to 64, and 9.6% who were 65 years of age or older. The median age was 37 years. For every 100 females, there were 101.9 males. For every 100 females age 18 and over, there were 104.0 males.

The median income for a household in the town was $45,114, and the median income for a family was $47,361. Males had a median income of $29,833 versus $27,734 for females. The per capita income for the town was $18,783. About 3.6% of families and 5.1% of the population were below the poverty line, including 5.9% of those under age 18 and 8.3% of those age 65 or over.

== Notable people ==
- Lucian Pulvermacher, Pope Pius XIII
