= Granton, Wisconsin =

- Village
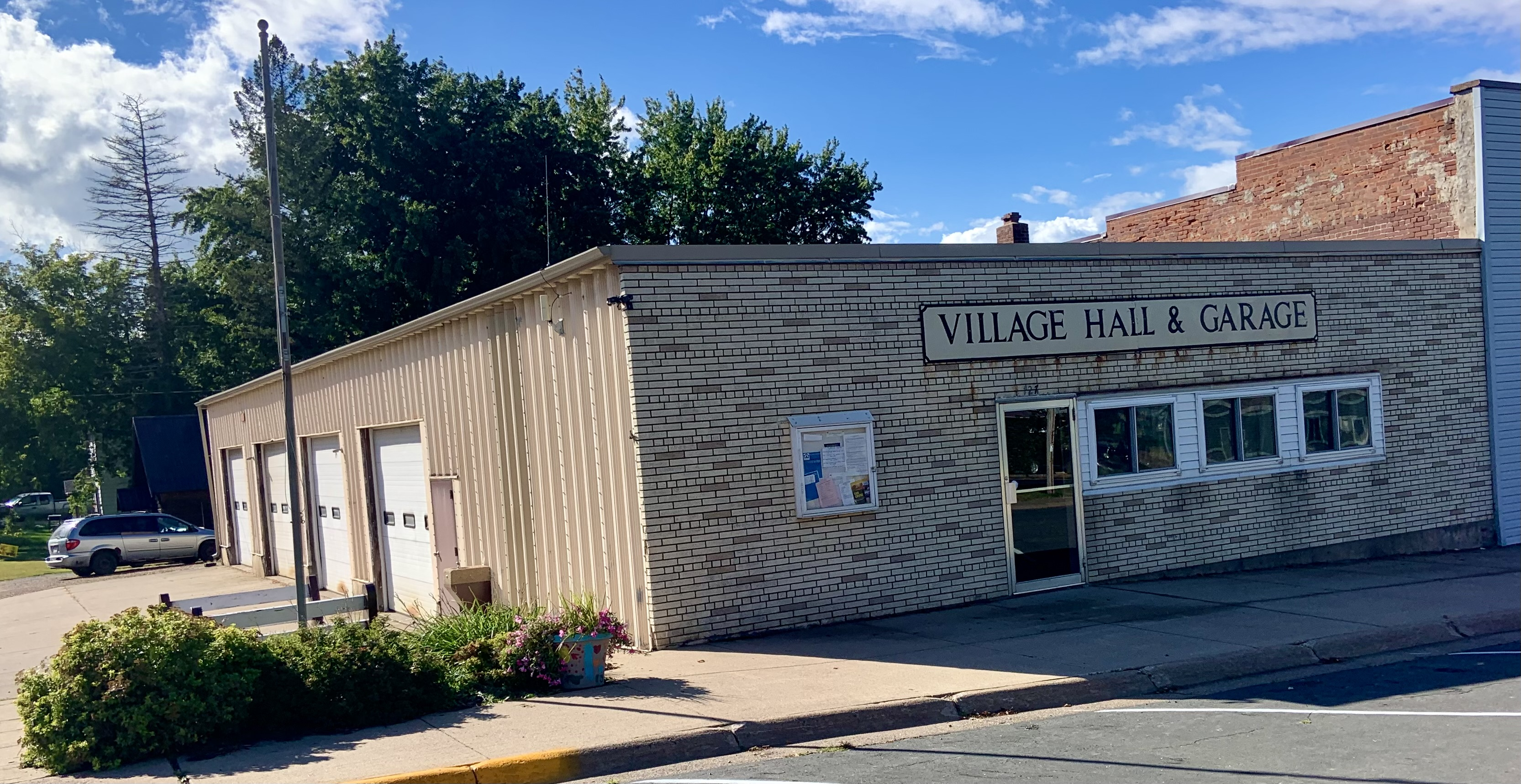
- Village hall

- Location of Granton in Clark County, Wisconsin.
- Coordinates: 44°35′14″N 90°27′42″W
- Country: United States
- State: Wisconsin
- County: Clark

Area
  - Total: 0.55 sq mi (1.42 km^{2})
  - Land: 0.54 sq mi (1.41 km^{2})
  - Water: 0.0039 sq mi (0.01 km^{2})
- Elevation: 1,119 ft (341 m)

Population (2020)
  - Total: 381
  - Density: 700/sq mi (270/km^{2})
- Time zone: UTC-6 (Central (CST))
  - Summer (DST): UTC-5 (CDT)
- Area codes: 715 & 534
- FIPS code: 55-30425
- GNIS feature ID: 1565749
- Website: https://villageofgranton.com/

Granton is a village in Clark County in the U.S. state of Wisconsin. The population was 381 at the 2020 census.

== History ==
Granton was founded in 1891. The village derived its name from the Town of Grant. A post office called Granton has been in operation since 1892.

== Geography ==
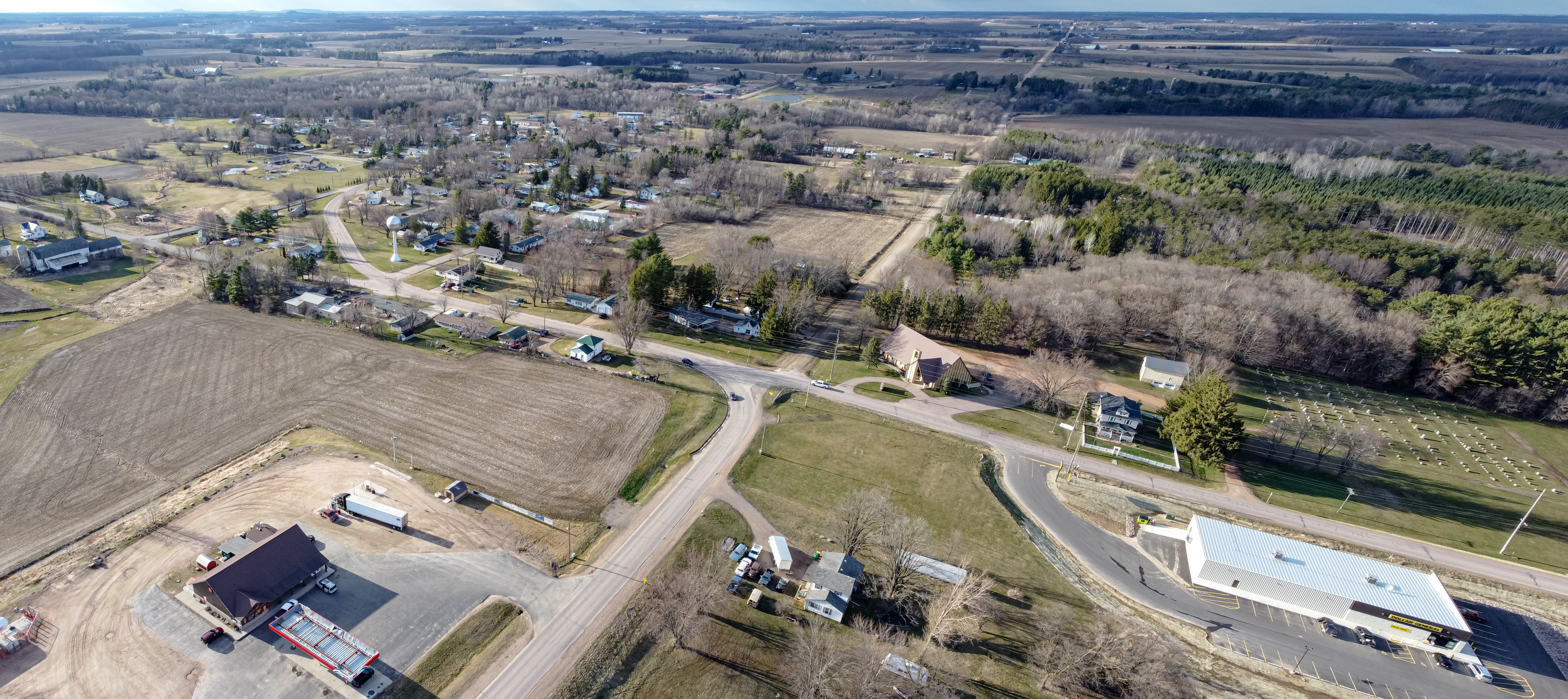

Granton is located at 44°35′14″N 90°27′42″W (44.587093, -90.461773).

According to the United States Census Bureau, the village has a total area of 0.56 square miles (1.45 km^{2}), all land.

== Demographics ==
Historical population
Census	Pop.	Note	%±
1920	334		—
1930	310		−7.2%
1940	300		−3.2%
1950	299		−0.3%
1960	278		−7.0%
1970	288		3.6%
1980	399		38.5%
1990	379		−5.0%
2000	406		7.1%
2010	355		−12.6%
2020	381		7.3%
U.S. Decennial Census

=== 2010 census ===
As of the census of 2010, there were 355 people, 151 households, and 93 families living in the village. The population density was 633.9 inhabitants per square mile (244.8/km^{2}). There were 165 housing units at an average density of 294.6 per square mile (113.7/km^{2}). The racial makeup of the village was 98.6% White, 0.6% Asian, 0.3% from other races, and 0.6% from two or more races. Hispanic or Latino of any race were 1.1% of the population.

There were 151 households, of which 25.8% had children under the age of 18 living with them, 46.4% were married couples living together, 11.9% had a female householder with no husband present, 3.3% had a male householder with no wife present, and 38.4% were non-families. 31.8% of all households were made up of individuals, and 13.9% had someone living alone who was 65 years of age or older. The average household size was 2.32 and the average family size was 2.92.

The median age in the village was 42.8 years. 25.6% of residents were under the age of 18; 6.5% were between the ages of 18 and 24; 20.8% were from 25 to 44; 31.9% were from 45 to 64; and 15.2% were 65 years of age or older. The gender makeup of the village was 51.3% male and 48.7% female.

=== 2000 census ===
As of the census of 2000, there were 406 people, 156 households, and 104 families living in the village. The population density was 718.0 people per square mile (275.0/km^{2}). There were 164 housing units at an average density of 290.0 per square mile (111.1/km^{2}). The racial makeup of the village was 98.03% White, 0.74% African American, 0.25% Native American, 0.49% Asian, and 0.49% from two or more races. Hispanic or Latino of any race were 0.25% of the population.

There were 156 households, out of which 32.7% had children under the age of 18 living with them, 52.6% were married couples living together, 8.3% had a female householder with no husband present, and 33.3% were non-families. 28.2% of all households were made up of individuals, and 12.2% had someone living alone who was 65 years of age or older. The average household size was 2.55 and the average family size was 3.19.

In the village, the population was spread out, with 30.5% under the age of 18, 9.6% from 18 to 24, 26.8% from 25 to 44, 18.7% from 45 to 64, and 14.3% who were 65 years of age or older. The median age was 33 years. For every 100 females, there were 107.1 males. For every 100 females age 18 and over, there were 95.8 males.

The median income for a household in the village was $30,288, and the median income for a family was $35,972. Males had a median income of $26,477 versus $21,354 for females. The per capita income for the village was $12,218. About 13.3% of families and 14.5% of the population were below the poverty line, including 20.4% of those under age 18 and 20.4% of those age 65 or over.
