= Wisconsin Highway 179 =

State highway in Wisconsin, United States

State Trunk Highway 179
- WIS 179highlighted in red

Route information
- Maintained by WisDOT
- Length: 8.80 mi (14.16 km)

Major junctions
- West end: WIS 27 in Eastman
- East end: WIS 131 in Steuben

Location
- Country: United States
- State: Wisconsin
- Counties: Crawford

Highway system
- Wisconsin State Trunk Highway System; Interstate; US; State; Scenic; Rustic
← WIS 178	→ WIS 180

State Trunk Highway 179 (often called Highway 179, STH-179 or WIS 179) is a state highway in the U.S. state of Wisconsin. It runs east–west in south Wisconsin from in Eastman to near Steuben.

== Route description ==
Starting from WIS 27/CTH-D north of Eastman, WIS 179 meanders eastward. As it travels east, it only intersects CTH-E before reaching WIS 131. At WIS 131 in Steuben, WIS 179 ends there.

== History ==
Initially, WIS 179 used to be part of CTH-D. Since 1947, a large part of CTH-D from Eastman to Steuben became WIS 179.

== Major intersections ==
The entire route is in Crawford County.

Location	mi	km	Destinations	Notes
Eastman	0.00	0.00	WIS 27 – Prairie du Chien, Mount Sterling	
Steuben	8.80	14.16	WIS 131 – Wauzeka, Bell Center	
1.000 mi = 1.609 km; 1.000 km = 0.621 mi
