= Wisconsin Highway 27 =

Highway in Wisconsin

State Trunk Highway 27
- WIS 27 highlighted in red

Route information
- Maintained by WisDOT
- Length: 294.08 mi (473.28 km)

Major junctions
- South end: US 18 / WIS 60 in Prairie du Chien
- US 14 / US 61 in Viroqua; US 14 / US 61 in Westby; I-90 in Sparta; US 12 in Black River Falls; I-94 in Black River Falls; US 10 in Fairchild; US 12 in Augusta; US 8 in Ladysmith; US 63 / WIS 77 in Hayward
- North end: US 2 in Brule

Location
- Country: United States
- State: Wisconsin
- Counties: Crawford, Vernon, Monroe, Jackson, Clark, Eau Claire, Chippewa, Rusk, Sawyer, Bayfield, Douglas

Highway system
- Wisconsin State Trunk Highway System; Interstate; US; State; Scenic; Rustic
← WIS 26	→ WIS 28

State Trunk Highway 27 (often called Highway 27, STH-27 or WIS 27) is a state highway in the US state of Wisconsin. The highway spans a length of 294 miles (473 km) and is generally two-lane local road with the exception of urban multilane arterials within some cities. Earlier routing of the highway had it reaching Superior along the present US Highway 53 (US 53) and Fennimore along the present US 61 and following Interstate 94 (I-94) between Black River Falls and Osseo.

== Route description ==
In southern Crawford County, WIS 27 begins at a junction with US 18, WIS 60 and WIS 35 in Prairie du Chien. The highway turns north after a three-mile (4.8 km) northeast stretch out of the city and passes through Eastman and Mount Sterling. After entering Vernon County, WIS 27 converges with WIS 82 and turns northeast in Fargo. The two highways continue concurrently for seven miles (11 km) and turn northwest onto US 14 and US 61. WIS 82 turns east off the concurrency in downtown Viroqua at the junction with WIS 56 west. WIS 27 turns north off the concurrency in Westby and crosses into Monroe County near Newry. The highway crosses WIS 33 in Cashton, Wisconsin and passes through Melvina before crossing I-90 just south of Sparta. In downtown Sparta, WIS 27 crosses WIS 16. The junction is also the west terminus of WIS 21 and the point where WIS 71 west joins WIS 27 heading north; WIS west follows WIS 16 east. WIS 71 turns westward off the highway near Four Corners. WIS 27 enters Jackson County seven miles (11 km) north of the WIS 71 west junction.

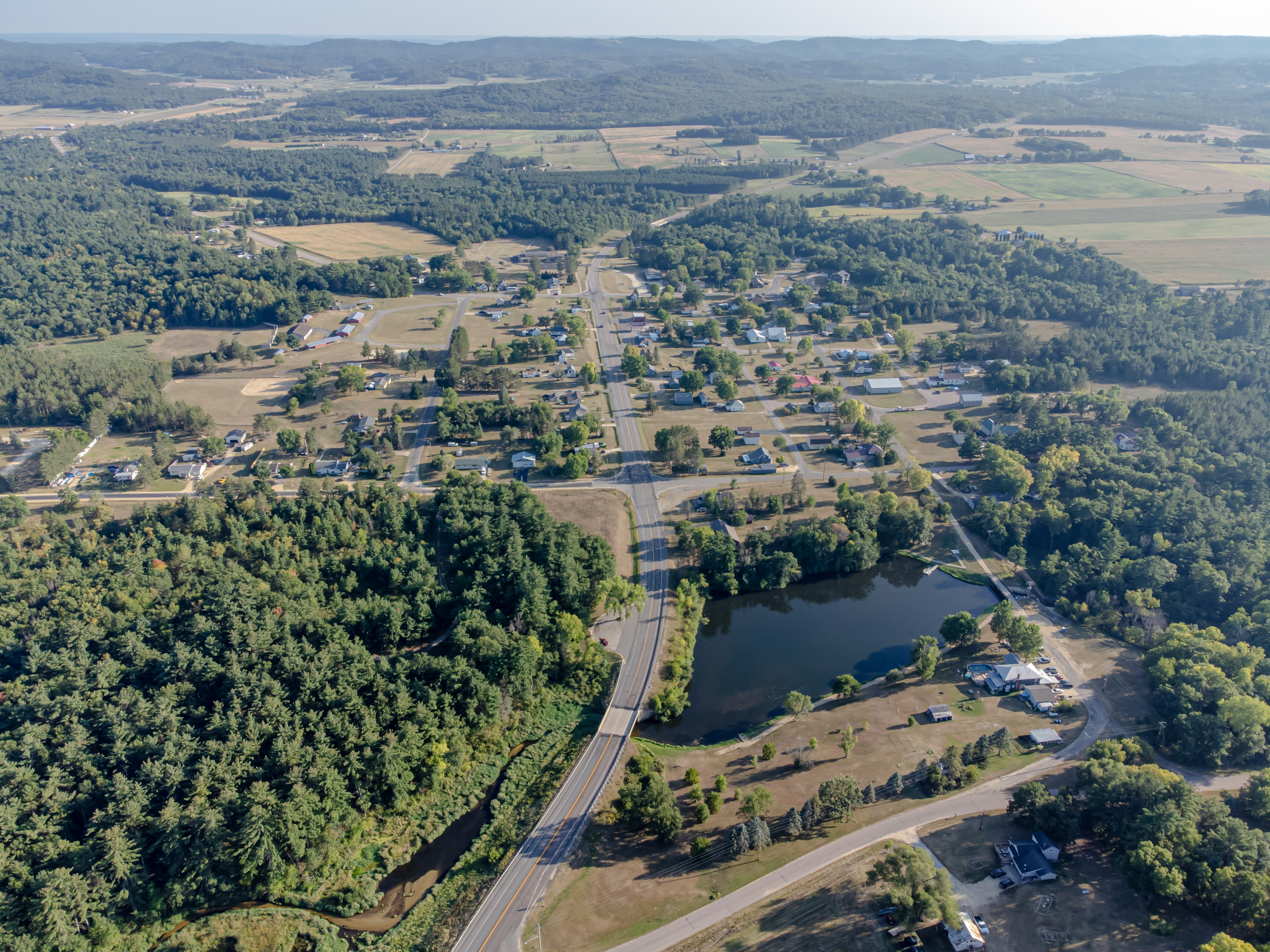
WIS 27 through Cataract

WIS 27 junctions with US 12 east on the south side of Black River Falls. The two highways run concurrently through the city and junction with WIS 54 in the city center and I-94 on the north side. US 12/WIS 27 crosses WIS 95 in Merrillan and entere Clark County four miles (6.4 km) north of Merrillan. The highway passes through Humbird and turns west onto US 10 and passes back into Jackson County. After entering Eau Claire County, US 12/WIS 27 turns northwest off US 10 in Fairchild. WIS 27 turns north off US 12 in Augusta. The highway crosses WIS 29 five miles (8.0 km) north of the Chippewa County line in Cadott and junctions with WIS 64 in Cornell. WIS 27 enters Rusk County five miles (8.0 km) north of Holcombe.

The entire stretch of WIS 27 is due north–south and passes through only one city, Ladysmith, midway through the county. WIS 27 crosses US 8 in Ladysmith. Eleven miles (18 km) after crossing into Sawyer County, WIS 27 turns west onto WIS 70 in Ojibwa. The highway passes through Radisson and Couderay along a stair-stepped northwest trek. WIS 27 turns north off the concurrency near Sand Lake The highway junctions with US 63 and WIS 77 in Hayward. WIS 77 west follows WIS 27 north for three miles (4.8 km) north of Hayward. WIS 27 enters Bayfield County seven miles (11 km) north of the WIS 77 west junction. WIS 27 passes through the county for 13 miles (21 km) before turning west into Douglas County WIS 27 turns north again and continues to its north terminus is at a junction with US 2 in Brule.

== History ==
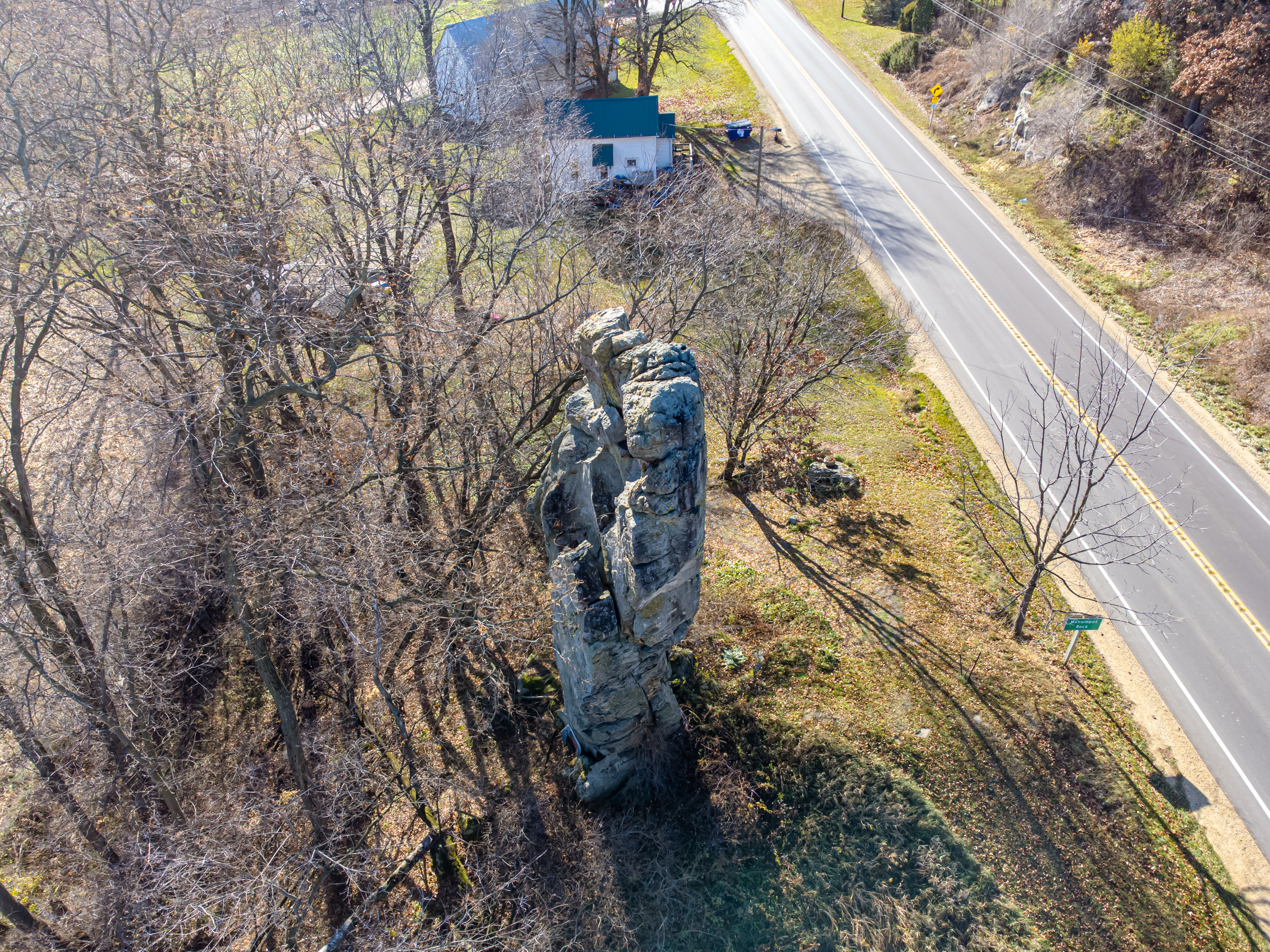
Monument Rock on WIS 27/WIS 82

When first added as part of the original Wisconsin state trunkline in 1918, WIS 27's northern terminus was at Sparta. It was extended further to WIS 12 at Shamrock in the early 1920s. It was extended to follow the current routing through Hayward (with the exception of the portion through Rusk and Sawyer counties to Radisson)—where it followed present day WIS 77 and US 53 (then WIS 11) to Superior in 1924. When US 61 was added in the late 1920s, WIS 27 was re-routed to Fennimore from Viroqua until 1932—when it was restored to its original routing to Prairie du Chien. The present route in Rusk and Sawyer counties was opened in the late 1940s and the section north of Hayward was rerouted along the present alignment in 1948. The section of WIS 27 between Black River falls and Augusta was rerouted to follow I-94 between Hixton and Osseo in 1967, but was relocated back to the section following US 12 in 1972.

== Major intersections ==
County	Location	mi	km	Destinations	Notes
Crawford	Prairie du Chien	0.0	0.0	US 18 / WIS 60 – Marquette	
Crawford	Prairie du Chien	0.4	0.64	WIS 35 south – Bloomington	Southern end of WIS 35 concurrency
Crawford	Prairie du Chien	0.6	0.97	WIS 35 north – Lynxville	Northern end of WIS 35 concurrency
Crawford	Eastman	13.7	22.0	WIS 179 east – Steuben	
Crawford	Seneca	20.6	33.2	CTH-E	
Crawford	Mount Sterling	25.7	41.4	WIS 171 – Ferryville, Gays Mills	
Crawford	Rising Sun	33.9	54.6	CTH-B	
Vernon	Fargo	36.6	58.9	WIS 82 west – De Soto	Southern end of WIS 82 concurrency
Vernon	Viroqua	43.6	70.2	US 14 east / US 61 south – Madison	Southern end of US 14/US 61 concurrency
Vernon	Viroqua	46.4	74.7	WIS 56 / WIS 82 east – Genoa, Viola, La Farge	Northern end of WIS 82 concurrency
Vernon	Westby	53.8	86.6	US 14 west / US 61 north – Coon Valley, La Crosse	Northern end of US 14/US 61 concurrency
Monroe	Cashton	60.7	97.7	WIS 33 – Middle Ridge, Cashton	
Monroe	Melvina	65.9	106.1	CTH-F	
Monroe	Sparta	75.6	121.7	I-90 – La Crosse, Madison	
Monroe	Sparta	76.9	123.8	WIS 16 / WIS 21 east / WIS 71 east – West Salem, Tomah	Southern end of WIS 71 concurrency
Monroe	Four Corners	86.0	138.4	WIS 71 west – Melrose	Northern end of WIS 71 concurrency
Monroe	Cataract	88.3	142.1	CTH-I	
Jackson	Black River Falls	102.6	165.1	US 12 east – Tomah	Southern end of US 12 concurrency
Jackson	Black River Falls	103.1	165.9	WIS 54 east – Wisconsin Rapids	Southern end of WIS 54 concurrency
Jackson	Black River Falls	103.3	166.2	WIS 54 west – Melrose	Northern end of WIS 54 concurrency
Jackson	Black River Falls	104.3	167.9	I-94 – Eau Claire, Madison	
Jackson	Merrillan	114.6	184.4	WIS 95 – Alma Center, Neillsville	
Clark	Humbird	120.9	194.6	CTH-B / CTH-F	
Clark	Fairchild	125.8	202.5	US 10 east – Neillsville	Southern end of US 10 concurrency
Jackson	Fairchild	128.3	206.5	US 10 west – Osseo	Northern end of US 10 concurrency
Eau Claire	Fairchild	128.4	206.6	CTH-H	
Eau Claire	Augusta	138.9	223.5	US 12 west – Eau Claire	Northern end of US 12 concurrency
Eau Claire		150.0	241.4	CTH-D	
Chippewa	Cadott	157.9	254.1	WIS 29 – Chippewa Falls, Wausau	
Chippewa	Cornell	174.1	280.2	WIS 64 west – Bloomer	Southern end of WIS 64 concurrency
Chippewa	Cornell	175.9	283.1	WIS 64 east – Gilman	Northern end of WIS 64 concurrency
Chippewa	Holcombe	181.2	291.6	CTH-M	
Rusk		185.4	298.4	CTH-D	
Rusk	Ladysmith	196.9	316.9	US 8 – Cameron, Prentice	
Sawyer	Ojibwa	220.0	354.1	WIS 70 east – Winter, Fifield	Southern end of WIS 70 concurrency
Sawyer	Radisson	225.5	362.9	WIS 40 south – Bruce	
Sawyer	Couderay	230.5	371.0	CTH-CC	
Sawyer	Sand Lake	243.1	391.2	WIS 70 west – Stone Lake, Spooner	Northern end of WIS 70 concurrency
Sawyer	Hayward	254.2	409.1	US 63 / WIS 77 east – Spooner, Mellen, Ashland	Southern end of WIS 77 concurrency
Sawyer	Hayward	258.1	415.4	WIS 77 west – Minong	Northern end of WIS 77 concurrency
Bayfield		279.3	449.5	CTH-N / CTH-Y	
Douglas	Winneboujou	292.0	469.9	CTH-B	
Douglas	Brule	294.08	473.28	US 2 – Superior, Ashland	
1.000 mi = 1.609 km; 1.000 km = 0.621 mi
