= Wisconsin Highway 171 =

State highway in Wisconsin, United States

State Trunk Highway 171
- WIS 171 highlighted in red

Route information
- Maintained by WisDOT
- Length: 33.39 mi (53.74 km)

Major junctions
- West end: WIS 35 in Ferryville
- US 61 in Rolling Ground
- East end: US 14 / CTH-E in Boaz

Location
- Country: United States
- State: Wisconsin
- Counties: Crawford, Richland

Highway system
- Wisconsin State Trunk Highway System; Interstate; US; State; Scenic; Rustic
← WIS 170	→ WIS 172

State Trunk Highway 171 (often called Highway 171, STH-171 or WIS 171) is a state highway in the U.S. state of Wisconsin. It runs east–west in southwest Wisconsin from near Ferryville to Boaz. A section of the route was initially designated as WIS 131 in 1924, but it was not signed as WIS 171 until sometime between 1948 and 1956, when the highway was extended east to US 14 near Boaz.

== Route description ==
The highway begins at an intersection with WIS 35 east of Lake Winneshiek, a lake along the Mississippi River. From there, it runs eastward, following Copper Creek until it ends just west of Mount Sterling, where it intersects WIS 27. The highway then runs eastward before curving to the north to run along an unnamed creek, which the highway follows to the southeast until it drains into the Kickapoo River, at which point the highway crosses it to run along Main Street in Gays Mills. East of Gays Mills, the highway curves up a hill and runs eastward, running concurrently with US 61 for 0.2 miles (0.32 km) in Rolling Ground. From there, the highway runs eastward to meet an unnamed creek and the English Run before curving to follow a different tributary of the English Run. After that tributary ends, the highway intersects with County Trunk Highway (CTH) UU and then curves southeast to another unnamed creek which begins near CTH-F. The highway follows it until reaching CTH-E in Boaz where it runs northward along Mill Creek before terminating at US 14.

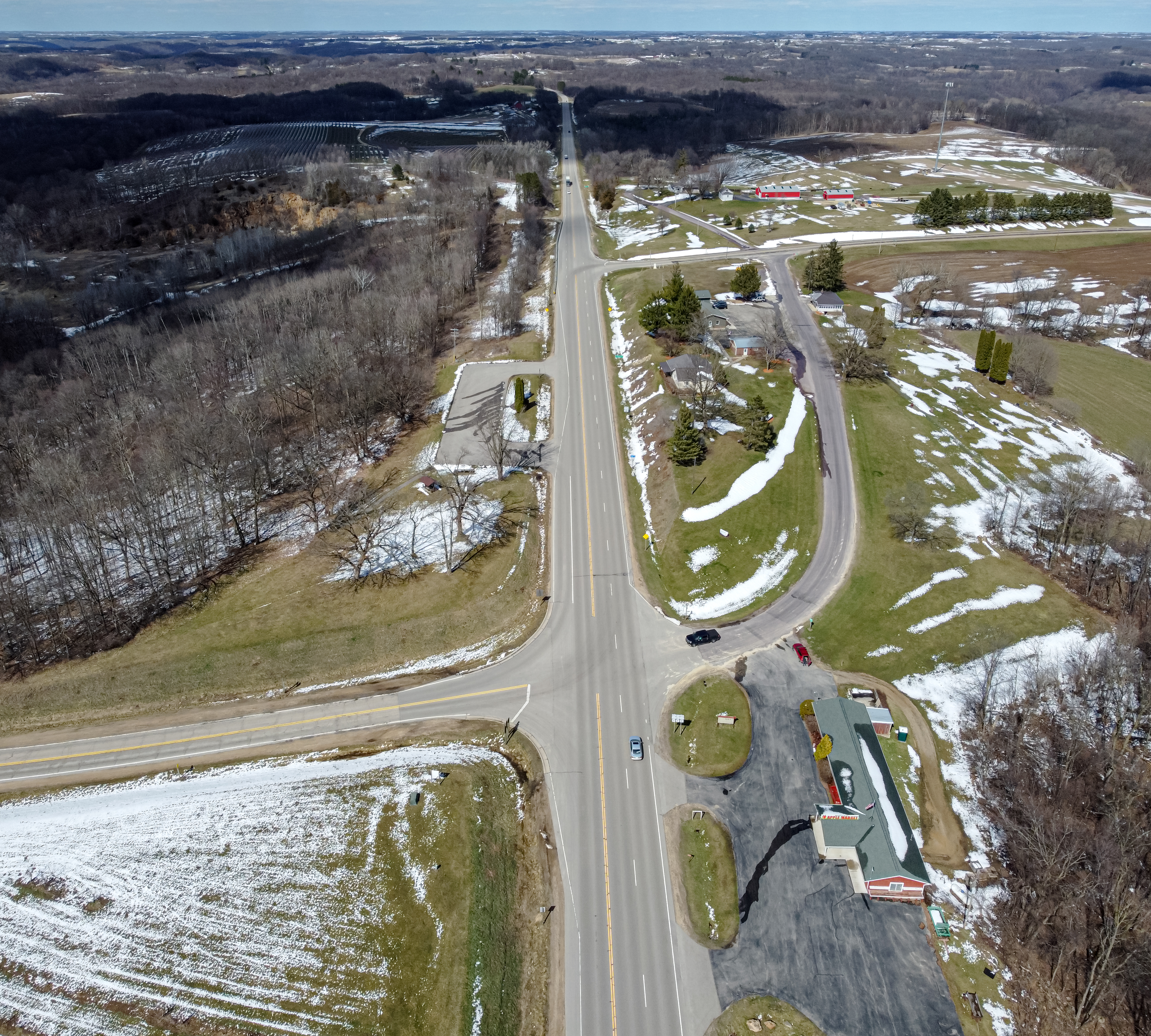
US 61/WIS-171 junction in Rolling Ground

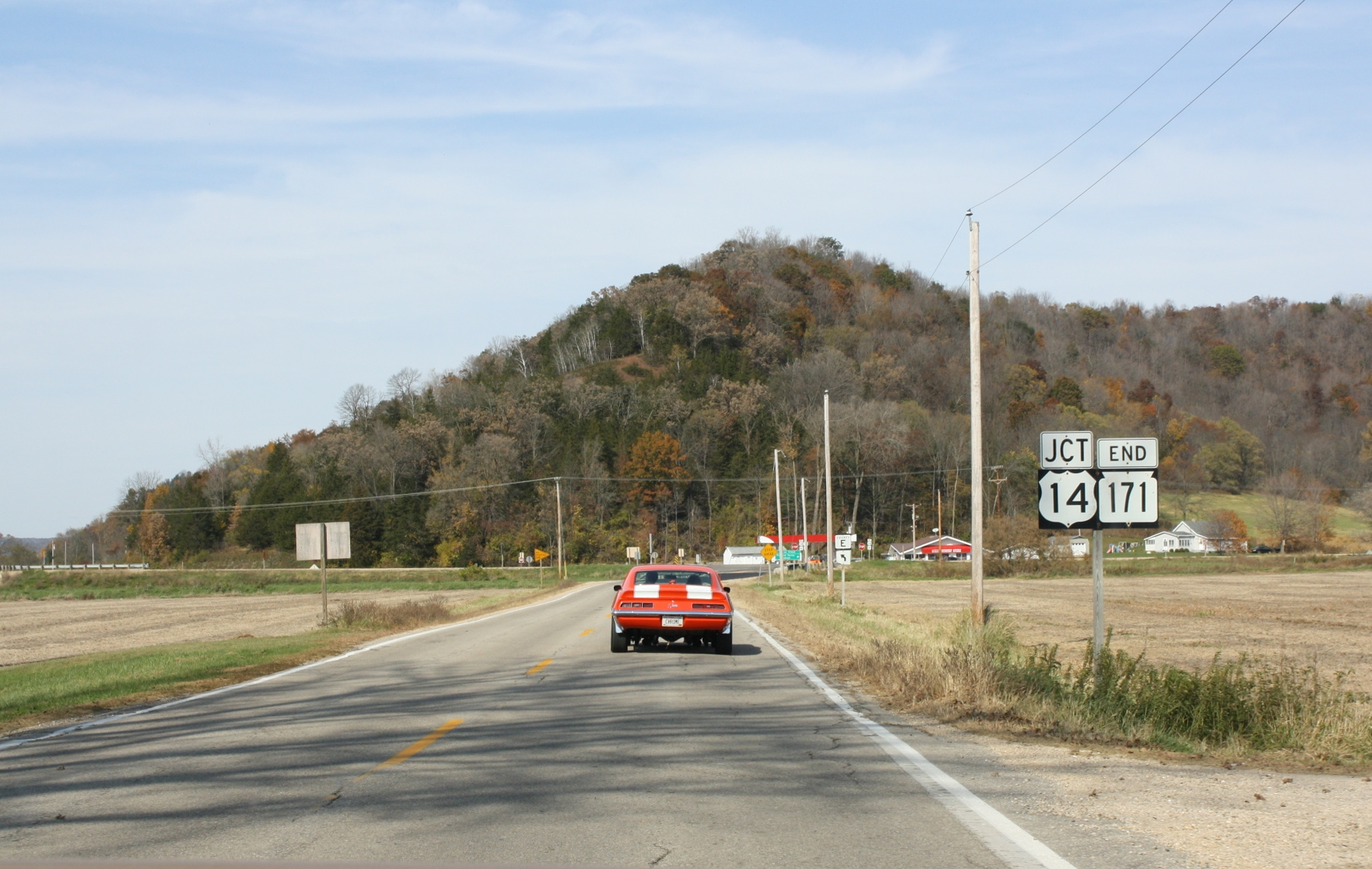
Eastern terminus

== History ==
In 1924, a route between Mount Sterling and Gays Mills was signed as WIS 131 and a route from Gays Mills to Boaz was signed as CTH-K. At the time, there was a western extension of WIS 131 to WIS 35 south of Ferrysville under construction. By 1925, the construction on the western extension was complete and the WIS 131 designation was extended north to Soldiers Grove. Sometime between 1948 and 1956, the route of CTH-K was signed as WIS 171 and the WIS 171 designation was extended along the former WIS 131 alignment to WIS 35. The highway was unpaved for its entire length.

== Major intersections ==
County	Location	mi	km	Destinations	Notes
Crawford	Seneca	0.0	0.0	WIS 35 / Great River Road – Ferryville, Lynxville	
Crawford	Mount Sterling	7.5	12.1	WIS 27 – Viroqua, Prairie du Chien	
Crawford	Gays Mills	12.9	20.8	WIS 131 – Soldiers Grove, Steuben	
Crawford	Clayton	19.1– 19.3	30.7– 31.1	US 61 – Soldiers Grove, Boscobel	Short concurrency with US 61
Crawford	Clayton	22.7	36.5	CTH-H north	
Richland	Akan	23.8	38.3	CTH-U north	Northern end of CTH-U concurrency
Richland	Akan	24.8	39.9	CTH-U south	Southern end of CTH-U concurrency
Richland	Akan	29.4	47.3	CTH-F south	
Richland	Boaz	32.3	52.0	CTH-E south	Southern end of CTH-E concurrency
Richland	Dayton	33.3	53.6	US 14 / CTH-E north – La Crosse, Richland Center, Madison	Northern end of CTH-E concurrency
1.000 mi = 1.609 km; 1.000 km = 0.621 mi: Concurrency terminus
