= Wisconsin Highway 56 =

State highway in Wisconsin, United States

State Trunk Highway 56
- WIS 56 highlighted in red

Route information
- Maintained by WisDOT
- Length: 50.56 mi (81.37 km)

Major junctions
- West end: WIS 35 in Genoa
- US 14 / US 61 / WIS 27 / WIS 82 in Viroqua
- East end: WIS 80 in Richland Center

Location
- Country: United States
- State: Wisconsin
- Counties: Vernon, Richland

Highway system
- Wisconsin State Trunk Highway System; Interstate; US; State; Scenic; Rustic
← WIS 55	→ WIS 57

State Trunk Highway 56 (often called Highway 56, STH-56 or WIS 56) is a state highway in the U.S. state of Wisconsin. It runs east–west in southwest Wisconsin from just north of Richland Center to Genoa. On some maps, it is listed as ending inside Richland Center, instead of just north of it.

== Route description ==
In Genoa, Wisconsin, WIS 56 begins at a non-signaled intersection with WIS 35, going northerly through town, before climbing the hill on the west side of town, not far from La Crosse Boiling Water Reactor. It winds its way and down several ridges, passing through the hamlet of Romance. WIS 56 then climbs onto a ridge, that takes it into Viroqua. WIS 56 enters Viroqua on Broadway Street, makes a right onto Hillyer Street, and rounds a corner onto Decker Street. At US Highway 14 (US 14), US 61, WIS 27, and WIS 82, WIS 56 encounters its only signalized intersection.

After crossing the highways, WIS 82 merges with WIS 56. This concurrency lasts for four miles (6.4 km). When this concurrency ends, WIS 56 continues straight along the road to Viola, Wisconsin. WIS 82 makes a 90° turn to the north.

After leaving WIS 82, WIS 56 climbs up, and then down Pea Vine Hill. It then traverses the hamlet of Liberty. About six miles (9.7 km) later, it enters the village of Viola, Wisconsin. WIS 56 then meets up with WIS 131, another concurrency. In downtown Viola, WIS 131/WIS 56 crosses the Vernon County line for WIS 56's first time. WIS 56 then continues straight, while WIS 131 turns northerly. WIS 56 continues south-south-easterly until its end at WIS 80.

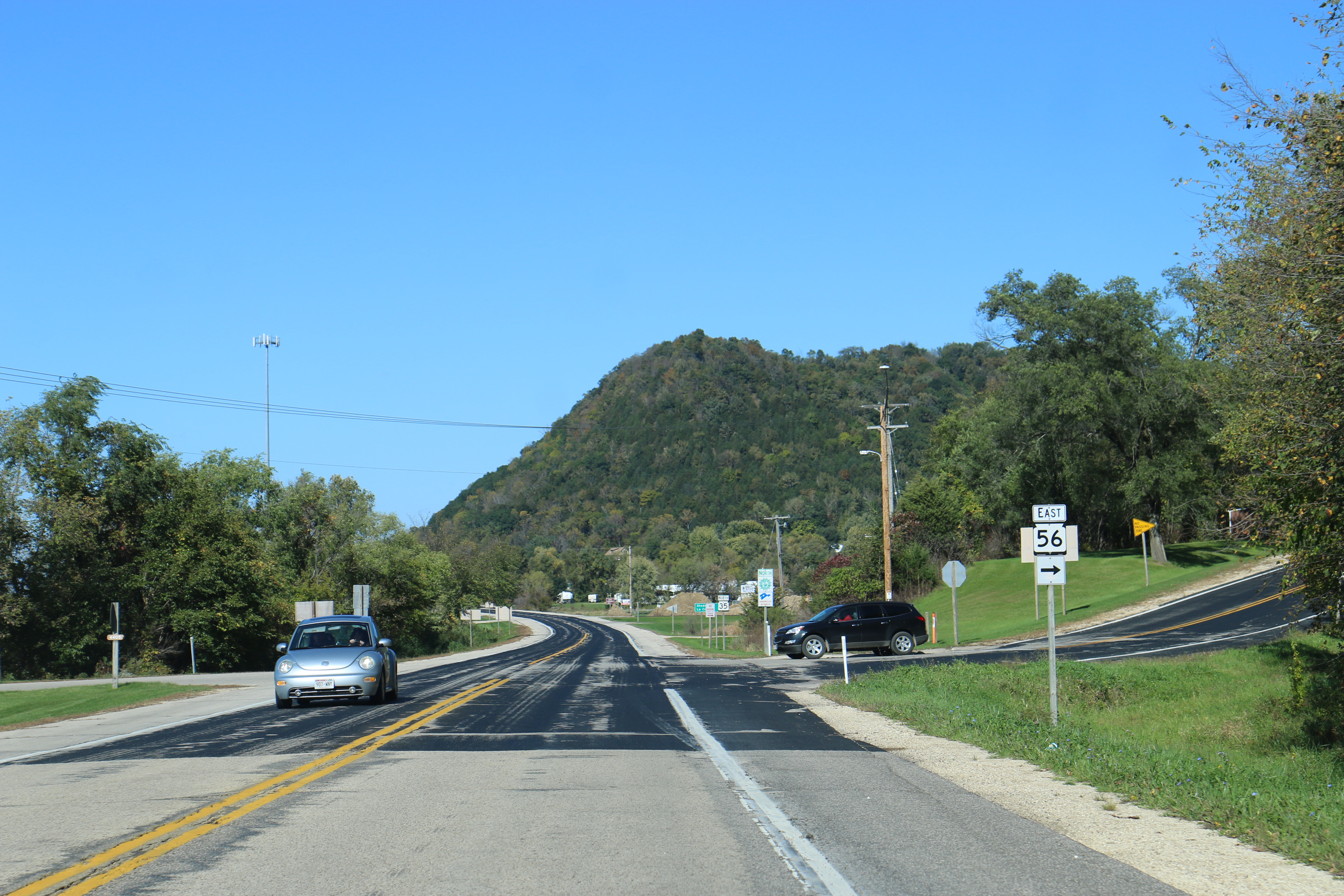
Western terminus on WIS 35

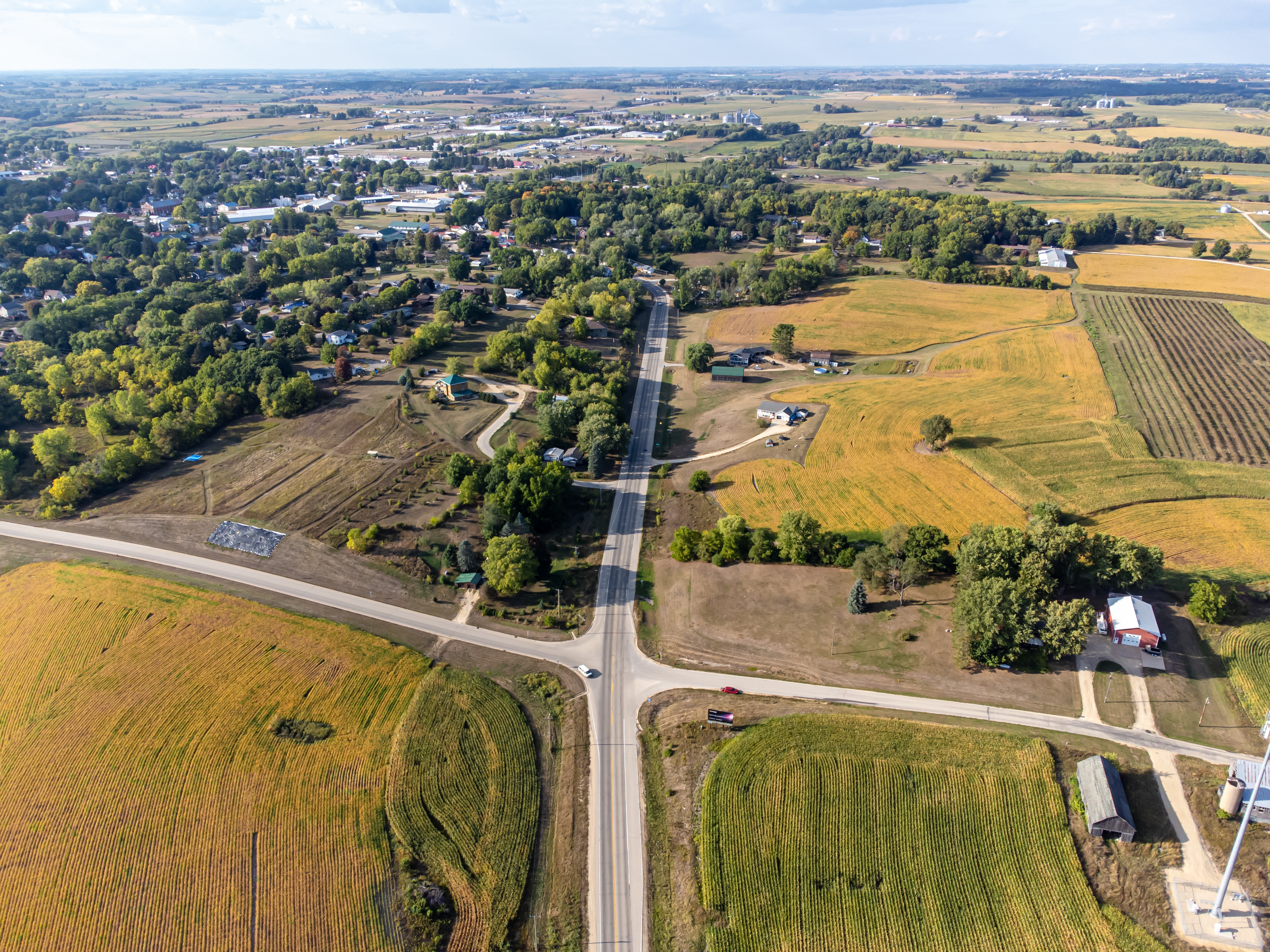
WIS 56 and WIS 82 heading west into the east side of Viroqua

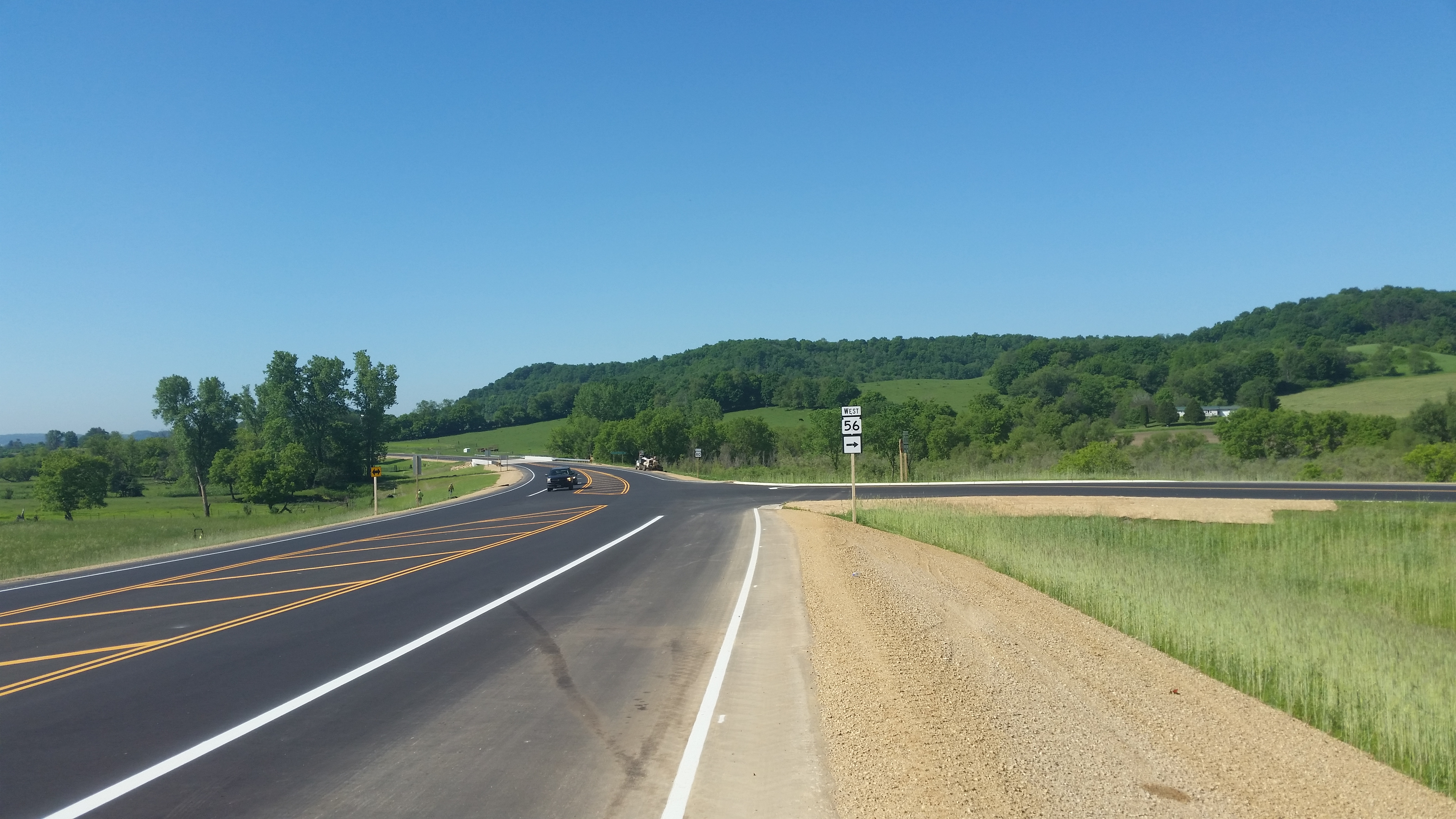
Eastern terminus on WIS 80

== Major intersections ==
County	Location	mi	km	Destinations	Notes
Vernon	Genoa			WIS 35 / Great River Road – Stoddard, De Soto	
Vernon	Viroqua			US 14 / US 61 / WIS 27 / WIS 82 west – La Crosse, Madison	Western end of WIS 82 overlap
Vernon	Town of Viroqua			WIS 82 east – La Farge	Eastern end of WIS 82 overlap
Vernon	Viola			WIS 131 south – Readstown	Western end of WIS 131 overlap
Richland	Viola			WIS 131 north – La Farge	Eastern end of WIS 131 overlap
Richland	Town of Rockbridge			WIS 80 – Richland Center, Hillsboro	
1.000 mi = 1.609 km; 1.000 km = 0.621 mi: Concurrency terminus
