= Wisconsin Highway 131 =

State highway in Wisconsin, United States

State Trunk Highway 131
- WIS 131 highlighted in red

Route information
- Maintained by WisDOT
- Length: 78.9 mi (127.0 km)
- Existed: 1924–present

Major junctions
- South end: WIS 60 in Wauzeka
- US 61 in Soldiers Grove; US 14 / US 61 in Readstown; I-90 in Tomah
- North end: US 12 / WIS 16 in Tomah

Location
- Country: United States
- State: Wisconsin
- Counties: Crawford, Vernon, Richland, Monroe

Highway system
- Wisconsin State Trunk Highway System; Interstate; US; State; Scenic; Rustic
← WIS 130	→ WIS 132

State Trunk Highway 131 (also called Highway 131, STH-131 or WIS 131) is a 78.9-mile (127.0 km) state highway in the U.S. state of Wisconsin. The highway is located in Wisconsin's Driftless Area, passing through Crawford, Vernon, Richland, and Monroe counties. It runs from WIS 60 near Wauzeka north to US Highway 12 (US 12) and WIS 16 in Tomah. WIS 131 is maintained by the Wisconsin Department of Transportation (WisDOT).

WIS 131 was designated by 1924 on a road between Ferryville and Gays Mills. It was realigned and extended several times in the next twenty-five years, and by 1948 it connected Wauzeka and Tomah roughly along its present route. The highway was rerouted in northern Vernon County in the 1970s in expectation of a new dam on the Kickapoo River; however, part of the rerouting between Rockton and Ontario was put on hold when the dam project stalled in 1975. WisDOT consequently performed very little maintenance on this section of WIS 131 for the next two decades, and it fell into disrepair. The state ultimately rebuilt the highway in the early 2000s, and the refurbished highway opened in 2003.

== Route description ==
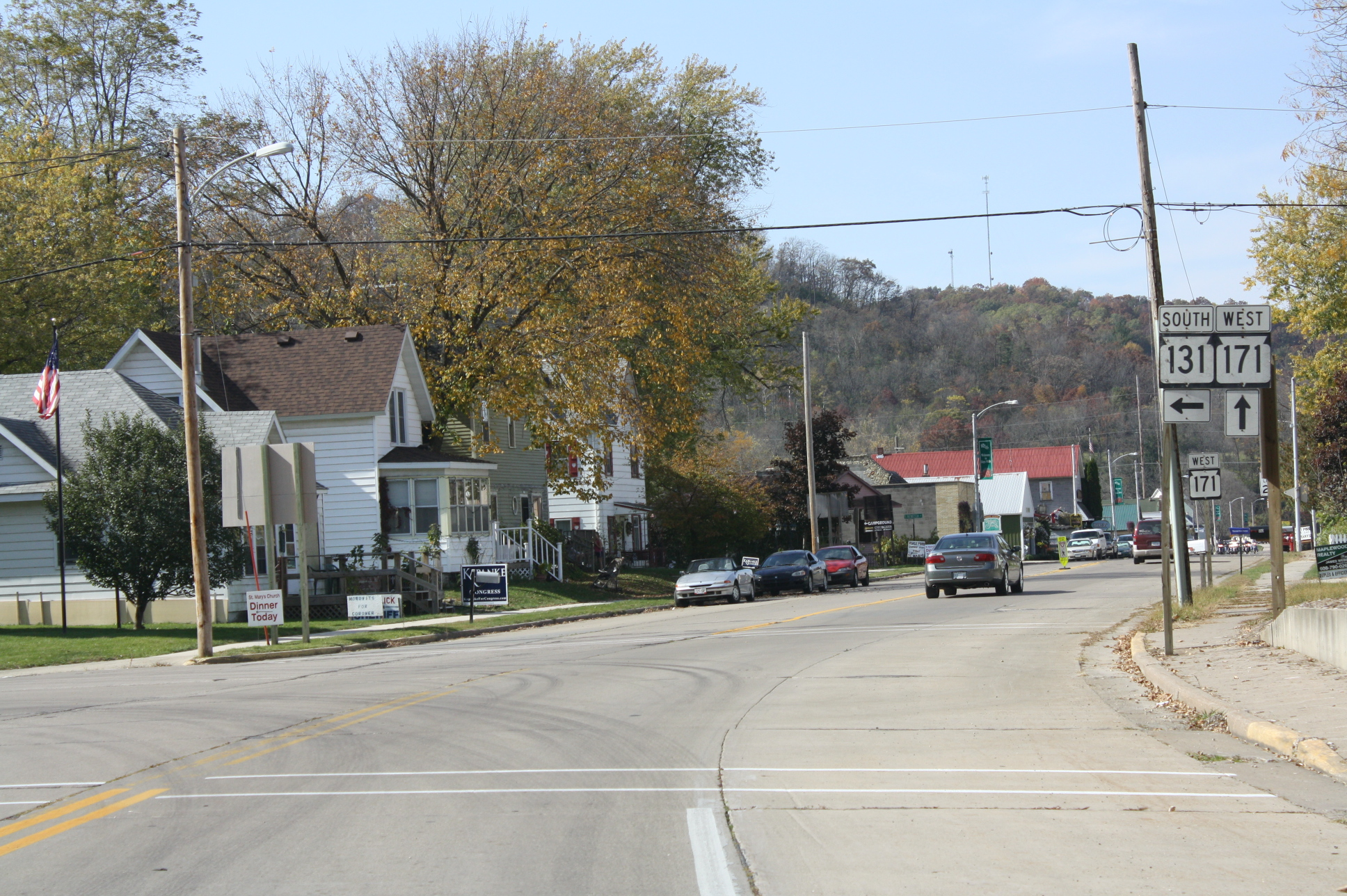
WIS 131 at its junction with WIS 171 in Gays Mills

=== Wauzeka to Viola ===
WIS 131 runs through hilly, rural terrain characteristic of the Driftless Area and Western Upland for its entire length. The route generally passes through farmland or wooded areas, though it also enters several small towns. WIS 131 begins in Crawford County at a three-way intersection with WIS 60 northeast of Wauzeka and north of the Wisconsin River. The highway heads northward from the intersection toward Steuben. WIS 131 begins to follow the Kickapoo River here and it runs within the river's valley until Wilton. The highway enters Steuben from the southeast and heads east as Farris Street toward another 3-way intersection with WIS 179. WIS 131 heads north from this intersection as Midway Street for about a block before turning east and leaving Steuben as Railroad Street.

WIS 131 turns north again outside of Steuben and passes through Barnum, Petersburg and Bell Center before intersecting WIS 171 in Gays Mills. North of Gays Mills, the highway heads north-northeast toward Soldiers Grove. The route enters Soldiers Grove as Church Street before turning east onto Pine Street and intersecting US 61. WIS 131 becomes concurrent with US 61 and heads north into Vernon County toward Readstown. WIS 131 and US 61 enter Readstown as Soldiers Grove Road and meet US 14 at a three-way intersection, where WIS 131 leaves US 61 and follows US 14 east across the Kickapoo River. The highway's concurrencies with US 61 and US 14 are the only parts of the highway which are part of the National Highway System. After 0.4 miles (0.64 km), WIS 131 turns north and leaves Readstown as 4th Street. Outside of Readstown, WIS 131 cuts east and passes through the community of Kickapoo Center before turning back north toward Viola. The highway enters Viola from the southwest as Commercial Street, passes Kickapoo High School and briefly becomes concurrent with WIS 56. WIS 131 enters northwest Richland County while in Viola and it remains in the county for a short distance northward.

=== La Farge to Tomah ===
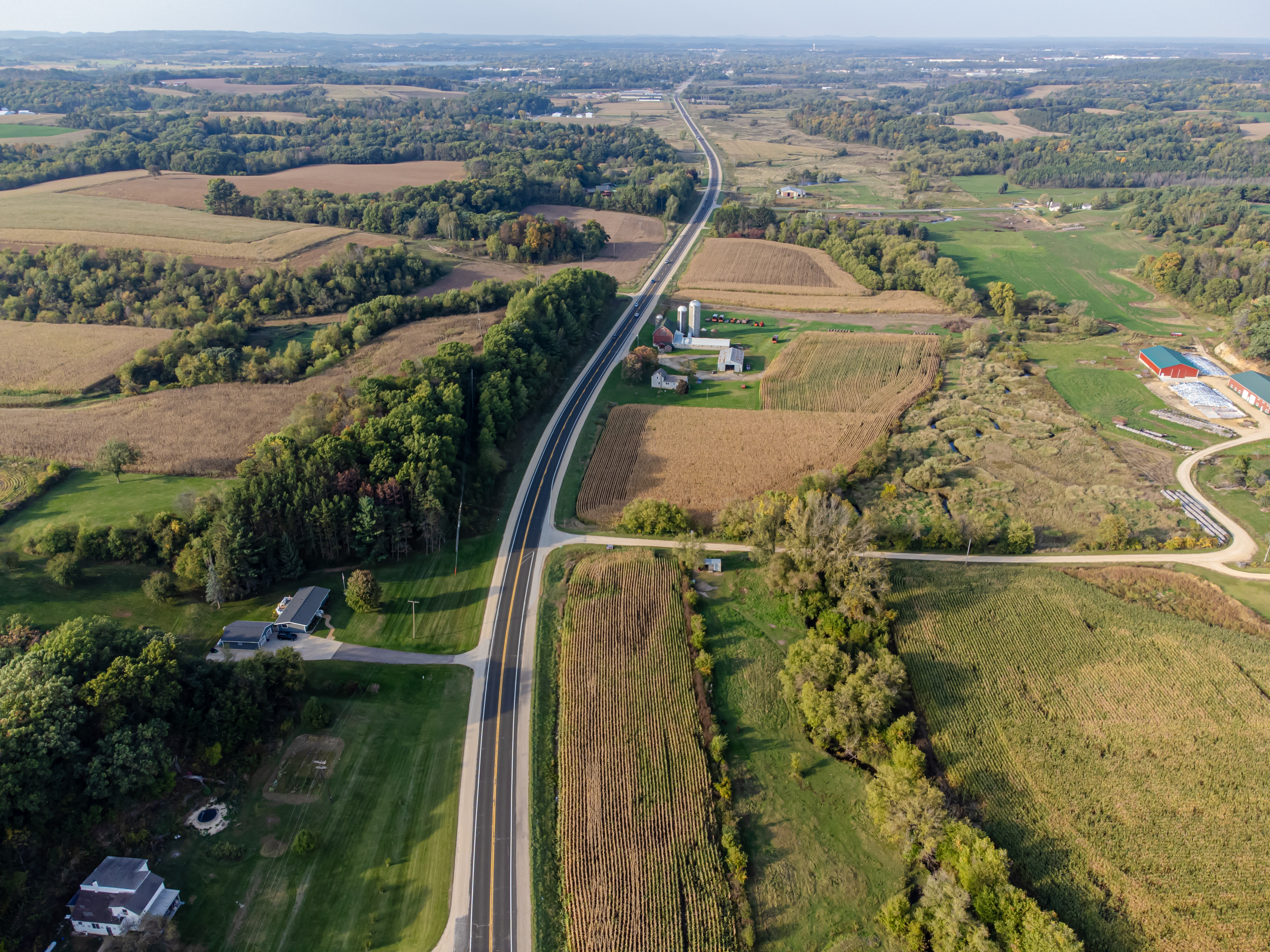
Wisconsin Highway 131 south of Tomah, looking north

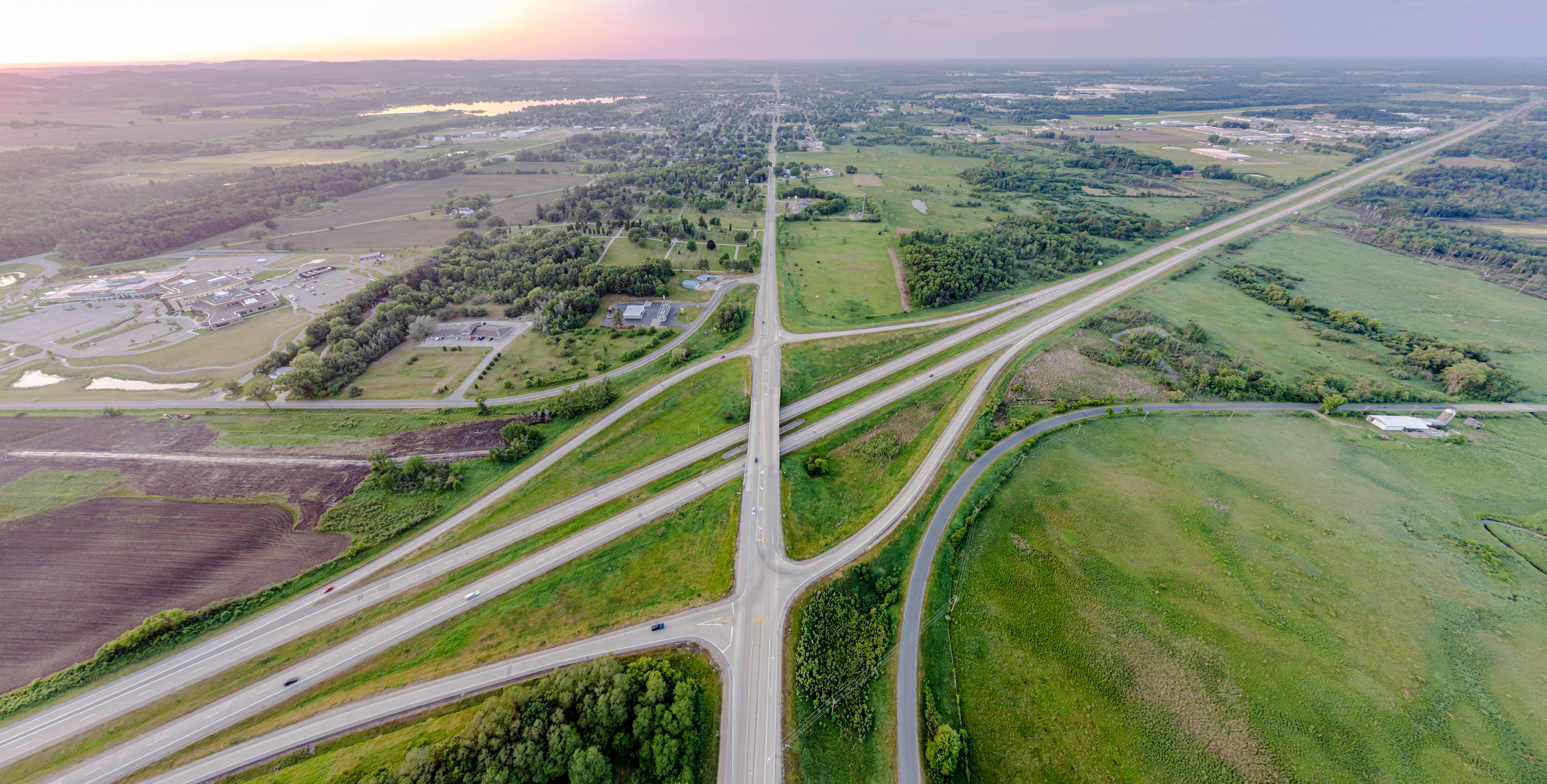
W-131 and I-90

After it returns to Vernon County, WIS 131 heads north toward La Farge. It enters La Farge from the south as State Street and follows WIS 82 west for four blocks before turning north and leaving the village as Mill Street. The highway enters the Kickapoo Valley Reserve north of La Farge; it continues through the Reserve until its northern border south of Ontario. WIS 131 passes through unincorporated Rockton and briefly enters the southwest corner of Wildcat Mountain State Park before reaching the village of Ontario. The road crosses the Kickapoo River seven times in the 7.3 miles (11.7 km) between Rockton and Ontario. In Ontario, WIS 131 meets WIS 33 and briefly follows it east before turning north and entering Monroe County. The highway heads north into Wilton, where it becomes concurrent with WIS 71. WIS 131 follows WIS 71 northeast out of Wilton as Walker Street, and the two highways are concurrent for 3.4 miles (5.5 km). The two highways parallel the Elroy-Sparta State Trail for most of their concurrency, and the trail crosses over the roads before they separate at a 3-way intersection northeast of Wilton. WIS 131 heads due north from this intersection toward Tomah. The highway intersects with Interstate 90 (I-90) in south Tomah and enters the city as Superior Avenue. This section of WIS 131 is the busiest of its entire route; according to WisDOT, this portion had an average daily traffic of 6800 vehicles in 2017. WIS 131 terminates at a four-way intersection with US 12 and WIS 16 in southern Tomah; traffic continues straight as US 12.

== History ==
WIS 131 was first designated by 1924 on a route from WIS 35 near Ferryville to WIS 11 in Gays Mills. When WIS 11 moved to a new route that bypassed Gays Mills in 1925, WIS 131 took on its route from there north to Soldiers Grove. The Wisconsin Highway Commission extended WIS 131 northward to La Farge in 1939 along a county highway that had been transferred to the state. In 1947, the Highway Commission switched the designations of WIS 131 and WIS 171 south and west of Gays Mills; WIS 131 took over the route between Gays Mills and Wauzeka, and its original route between Ferryville and Gays Mills became WIS 171. WIS 131 was extended from La Farge to its current terminus in Tomah in 1948.

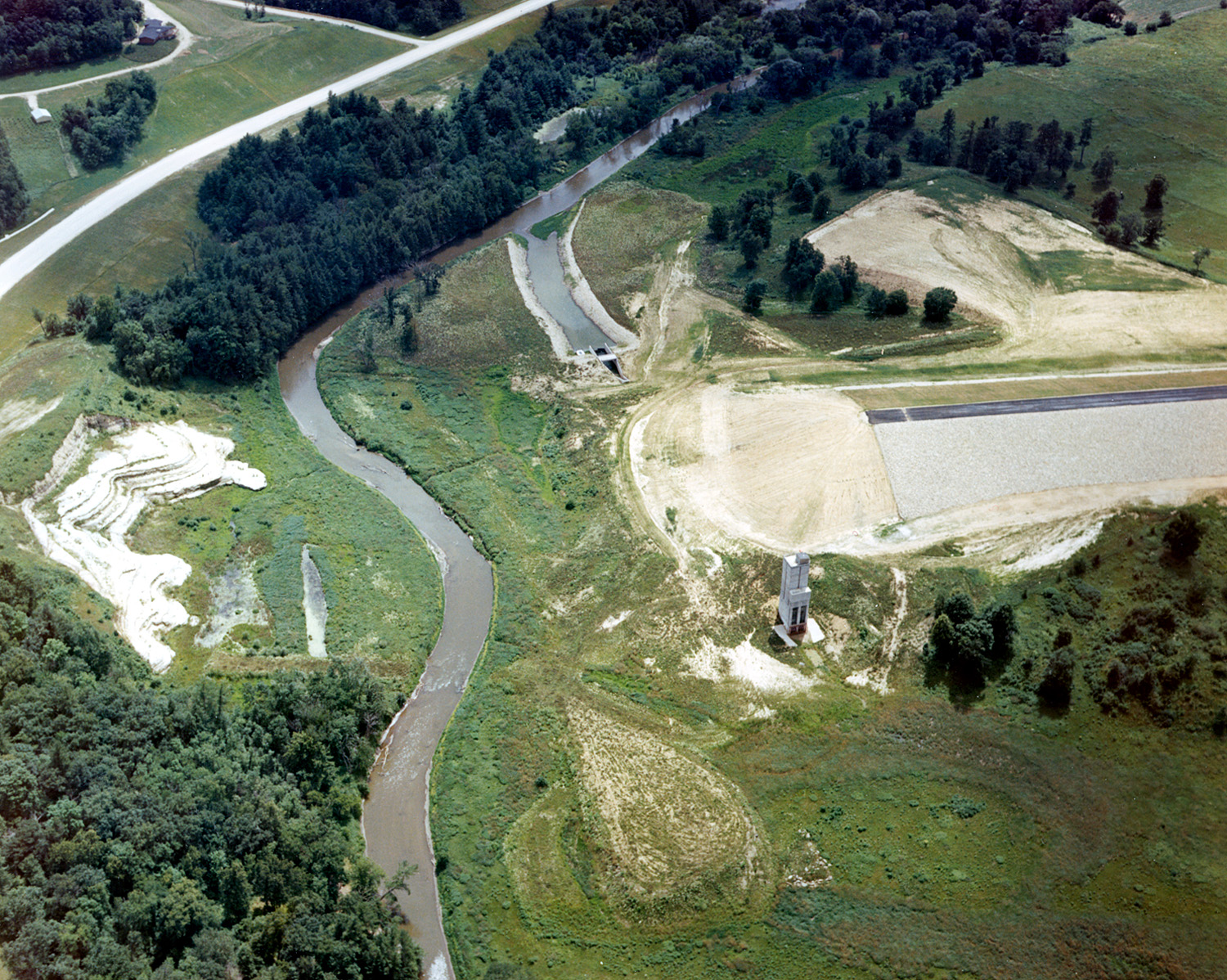
The incomplete Kickapoo River Dam in 1975, when construction stopped

In the 1970s, the federal government planned to dam the Kickapoo River between La Farge and Ontario. As WIS 131 crossed the river eleven times between these towns, the state had to relocate the highway to make way for the dam. The first section of WIS 131 to be moved, between La Farge and Rockton, was realigned away from the river to the east in 1976. The original highway was abandoned at first, as the dam was expected to flood the surrounding area, but was later converted to a recreational trail. The state planned to relocate the portion of WIS 131 between Rockton and Ontario as well; the proposed new highway would run along the east bank of the Kickapoo River to a realigned WIS 33, which it would follow into Ontario. The relocation plans were put on hold when work halted on the dam project, which was ultimately canceled in the 1990s; the federal government did not fully resolve the ownership of the underlying land until 2000.

Despite continued talks of reconstructing WIS 131 in the 1980s and 1990s, the ownership issues and local opposition delayed any plans to rebuild it. In the meantime, the section between Rockton and Ontario received little to no maintenance, leaving the road with a heightened accident rate and issues with flooding. Due to the opposition to the original relocation proposal, the state instead planned a $20 million project to rebuild the existing stretch of WIS 131; plans for this project were finalized in January 2000. The Kickapoo Valley Stewardship Alliance sued WisDOT to stop this plan as well, claiming it had violated the Water Resources Development Act of 1996 and the Transportation Act of 1966. The U.S. District Court for the Western District of Wisconsin struck down the lawsuit, and construction continued on the road. The improved section of WIS 131 was completed and dedicated in August 2003.

== Major intersections ==
County	Location	mi	km	Destinations	Notes
Crawford	Wauzeka	0.0	0.0	WIS 60 – Wauzeka, Prairie du Chien, Sauk City	
Crawford	Steuben	7.1	11.4	WIS 179 west – Eastman	
Crawford	Gays Mills	19.3	31.1	WIS 171 – Mount Sterling, Boaz	
Crawford	Soldiers Grove	27.0	43.5	US 61 south – Boscobel	Southern end of US 61 concurrency
Vernon	Readstown	31.1	50.1	US 14 west / US 61 north – Viroqua, La Crosse	Northern end of US 61 concurrency; western end of US 14 concurrency
Vernon	Readstown	31.5	50.7	US 14 east – Richland Center, Madison	Eastern end of US 14 concurrency
Vernon	Viola	38.9	62.6	WIS 56 west – Viroqua	Western end of WIS 56 concurrency
Richland	Viola	39.2	63.1	WIS 56 east – Richland Center	Eastern end of WIS 56 concurrency
Vernon	La Farge	45.2	72.7	WIS 82 east – Hillsboro	Eastern end of WIS 82 concurrency
Vernon	La Farge	45.4	73.1	WIS 82 west – Viroqua	Western end of WIS 82 concurrency
Vernon	Ontario	58.1	93.5	WIS 33 west – Cashton	Western end of WIS 33 concurrency
Vernon	Ontario	58.2	93.7	WIS 33 east – Hillsboro	Eastern end of WIS 33 concurrency
Monroe	Wilton	66.0	106.2	WIS 71 west – Norwalk, Sparta	Western end of WIS 71 concurrency
Monroe	Wilton	69.4	111.7	WIS 71 east – Kendall, Elroy	Eastern end of WIS 71 concurrency
Monroe	Tomah	78.3	126.0	I-90 – La Crosse, Madison	
Monroe	Tomah	78.9	127.0	US 12 / WIS 16 – Sparta, Black River Falls, Oakdale	
1.000 mi = 1.609 km; 1.000 km = 0.621 mi: Concurrency terminus
