= Eastman, Wisconsin =

- Village
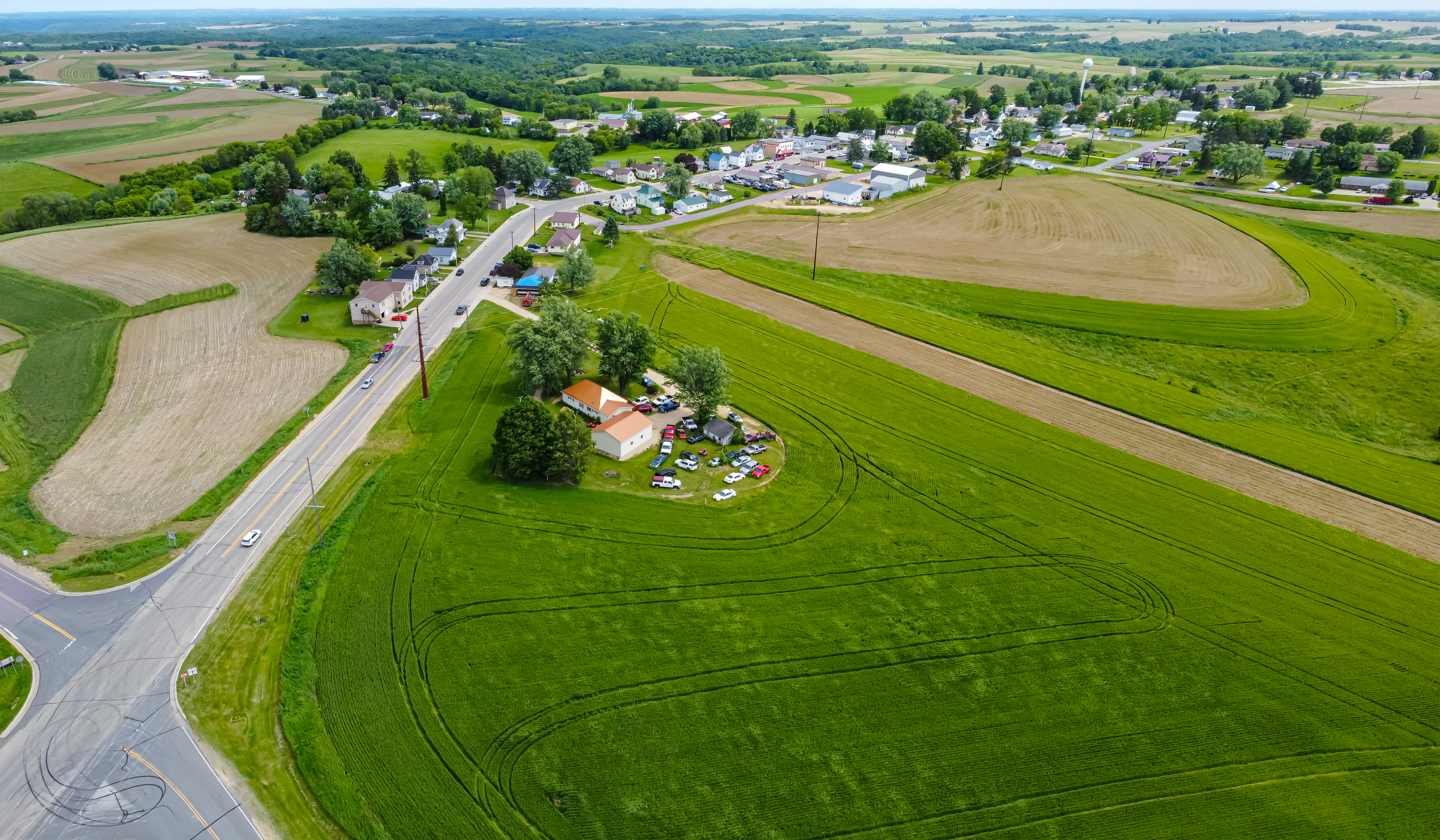
- Wis-27 & 179 junction on the north end of town

- Location of Eastman in Crawford County, Wisconsin.
- Coordinates: 43°9′28″N 90°59′50″W
- Country: United States
- State: Wisconsin
- County: Crawford

Area
  - Total: 3.61 sq mi (9.36 km^{2})
  - Land: 3.61 sq mi (9.35 km^{2})
  - Water: 0 sq mi (0.00 km^{2})
- Elevation: 1,145 ft (349 m)

Population (2020)
  - Total: 350
  - Density: 97/sq mi (37/km^{2})
- Time zone: UTC-6 (Central (CST))
  - Summer (DST): UTC-5 (CDT)
- Area code: 608
- FIPS code: 55-21925
- GNIS feature ID: 1564390
- Website: https://townofeastman.com/

Eastman is a village in Crawford County, Wisconsin, United States. The population was 350 at the 2020 census. The village is located within the Town of Eastman.

== Geography ==
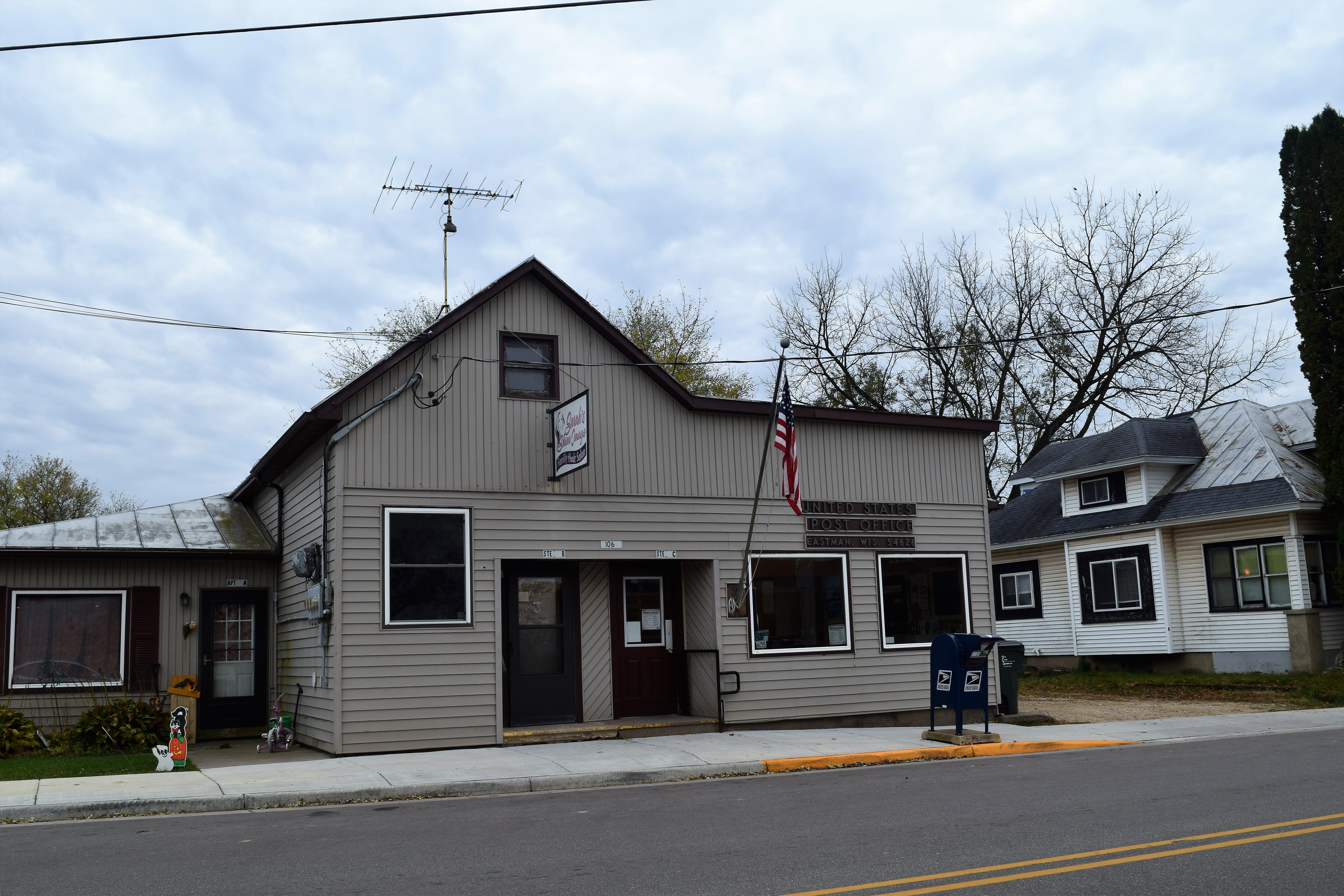
Eastman post office

Eastman is located at 43°9′49″N 91°1′9″W (43.163664, -91.019442).

According to the United States Census Bureau, the village has a total area of 3.61 square miles (9.35 km^{2}), all land.

== Demographics ==
Historical population
Census	Pop.	Note	%±
1910	233		—
1920	286		22.7%
1930	271		−5.2%
1940	348		28.4%
1950	359		3.2%
1960	348		−3.1%
1970	319		−8.3%
1980	371		16.3%
1990	369		−0.5%
2000	437		18.4%
2010	428		−2.1%
2020	350		−18.2%
U.S. Decennial Census

=== 2010 census ===
As of the census of 2010, there were 428 people, 168 households, and 117 families living in the village. The population density was 118.6 inhabitants per square mile (45.8/km^{2}). There were 179 housing units at an average density of 49.6 per square mile (19.2/km^{2}). The racial makeup of the village was 98.8% White and 1.2% from two or more races.

There were 168 households, of which 32.7% had children under the age of 18 living with them, 58.3% were married couples living together, 8.9% had a female householder with no husband present, 2.4% had a male householder with no wife present, and 30.4% were non-families. 25.6% of all households were made up of individuals, and 11.9% had someone living alone who was 65 years of age or older. The average household size was 2.55 and the average family size was 3.13.

The median age in the village was 37.8 years. 25.9% of residents were under the age of 18; 9.8% were between the ages of 18 and 24; 23.3% were from 25 to 44; 27.2% were from 45 to 64; and 13.6% were 65 years of age or older. The gender makeup of the village was 51.2% male and 48.8% female.

=== 2000 census ===
As of the census of 2000, there were 437 people, 163 households, and 109 families living in the village. The population density was 122.2 people per square mile (47.1/km^{2}). There were 170 housing units at an average density of 47.5 per square mile (18.3/km^{2}). The racial makeup of the village was 97.25% White, 0.23% Native American, 0.23% Asian, and 2.29% from two or more races. 1.83% of the population were Hispanic or Latino of any race.

There were 163 households, out of which 37.4% had children under the age of 18 living with them, 60.7% were married couples living together, 0.6% had a female householder with no husband present, and 33.1% were non-families. 30.7% of all households were made up of individuals, and 16.6% had someone living alone who was 65 years of age or older. The average household size was 2.68 and the average family size was 3.43.

In the village, the population was spread out, with 31.8% under the age of 18, 8.0% from 18 to 24, 26.5% from 25 to 44, 19.7% from 45 to 64, and 14.0% who were 65 years of age or older. The median age was 34 years. For every 100 females, there were 96.8 males. For every 100 females age 18 and over, there were 98.7 males.

The median income for a household in the village was $32,321, and the median income for a family was $41,250. Males had a median income of $29,583 versus $21,250 for females. The per capita income for the village was $12,922. About 5.7% of families and 10.7% of the population were below the poverty line, including 8.8% of those under age 18 and 20.6% of those age 65 or over.

== Education ==
Eastman is in the Prairie du Chien Area School District.

== Notable people ==
- Barbara Bedford, actress featured in films from 1920 to 1945, was born in Eastman.
