= Gays Mills, Wisconsin =

- Village
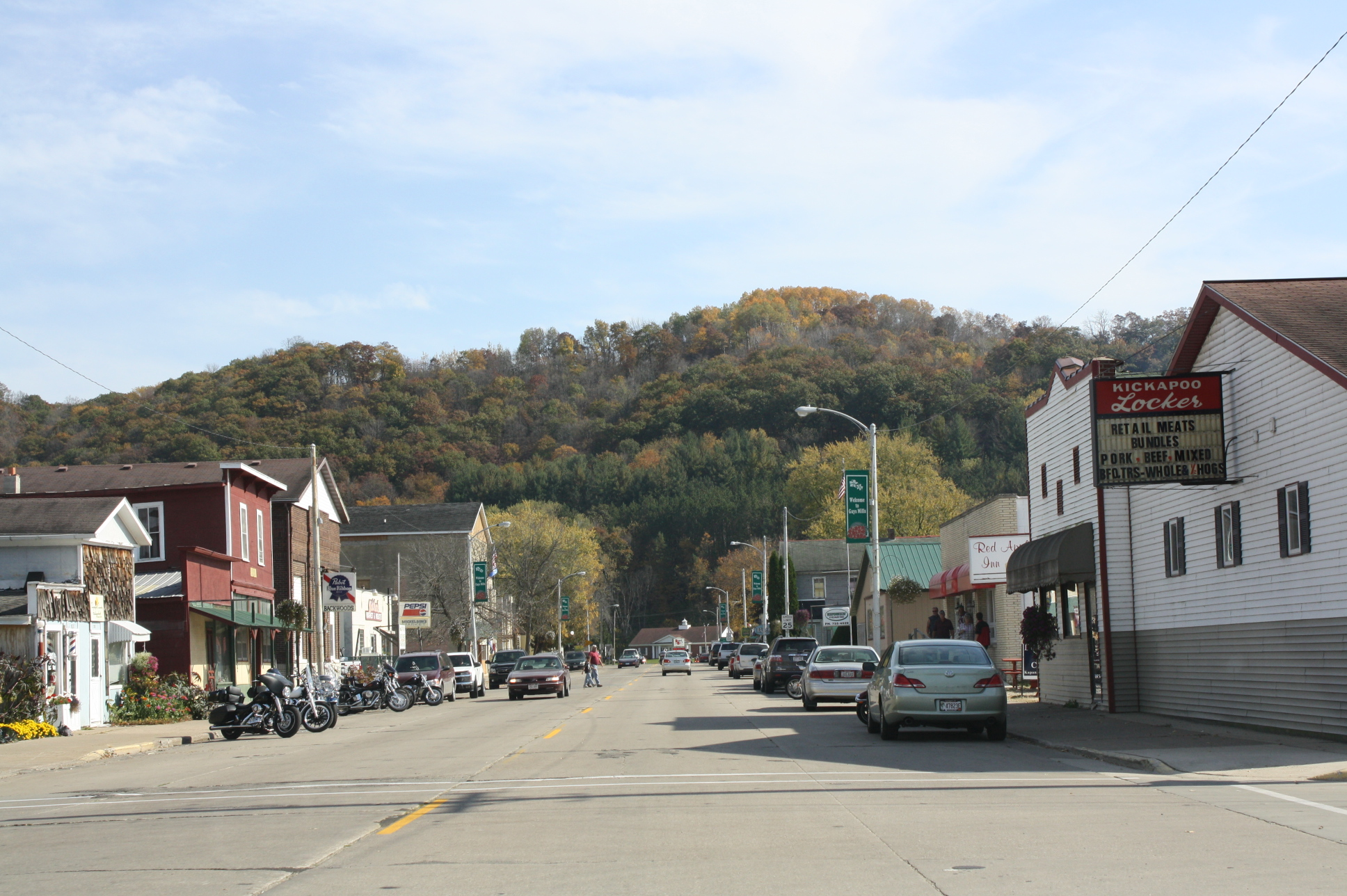
- Looking east at downtown Gays Mills in 2010

- Location of Gays Mills in Crawford County, Wisconsin.
- Coordinates: 43°19′6″N 90°50′48″W
- Country: United States
- State: Wisconsin
- County: Crawford

Area
  - Total: 4.90 sq mi (12.69 km^{2})
  - Land: 4.87 sq mi (12.62 km^{2})
  - Water: 0.027 sq mi (0.07 km^{2})
- Elevation: 702 ft (214 m)

Population (2020)
  - Total: 523
  - Density: 107/sq mi (41.4/km^{2})
- Time zone: UTC-6 (Central (CST))
  - Summer (DST): UTC-5 (CDT)
- Area code: 608
- FIPS code: 55-28450
- GNIS feature ID: 1565448
- Website: www.gaysmills.gov

Gays Mills is a village in Crawford County, Wisconsin, United States. The population was 523 at the 2020 census.

== History ==
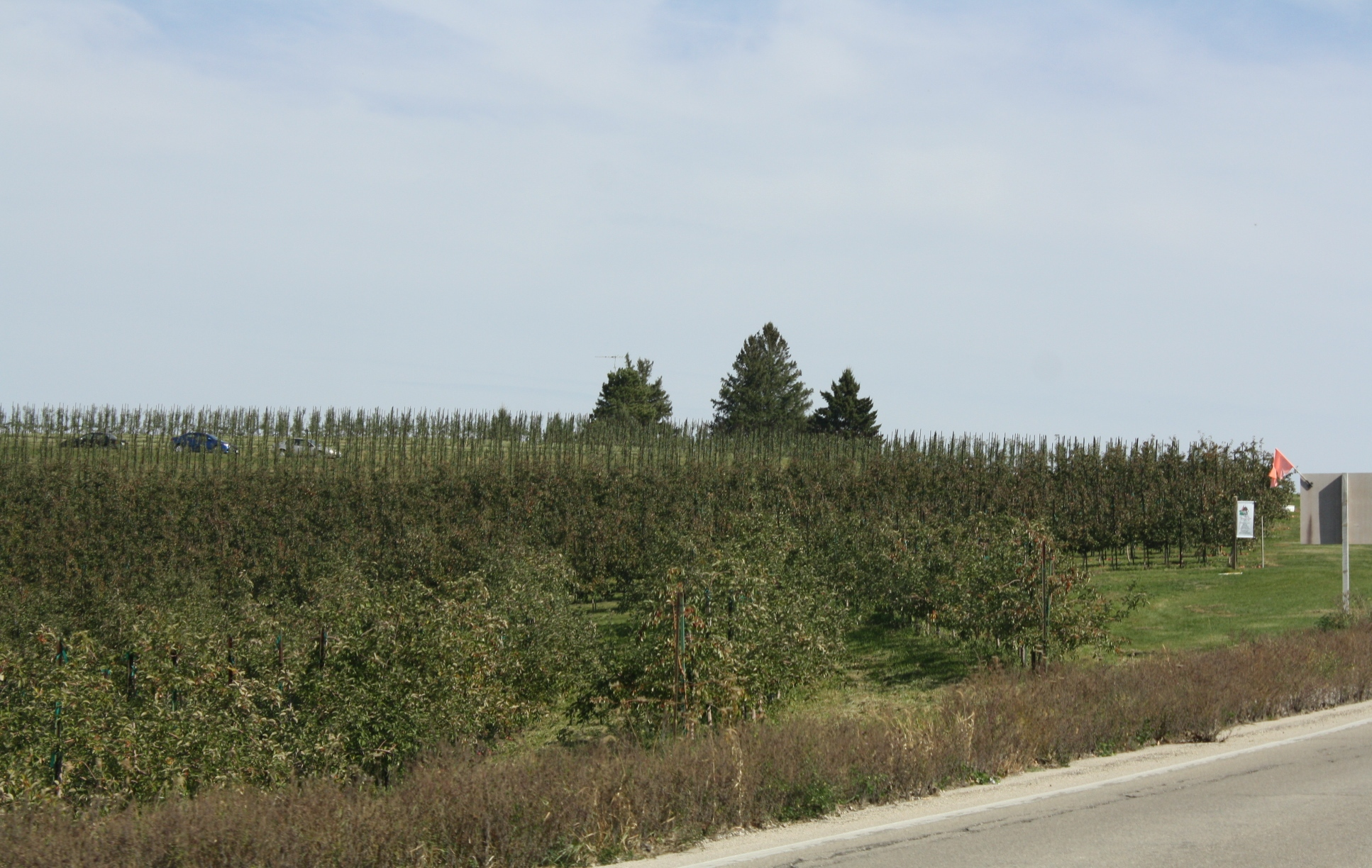
Orchards east of Gays Mills

In 1847 James B. Gay, a native of Indiana, built a dam and a sawmill on the Kickapoo River, which proved to be a flourishing success. When his health started to fail, James convinced his brothers John and Thomas to move to the area. In 1865 John Gay built the first flour mill south of the saw mill. In 1872 Thomas Gay and family organized the First Congregational Church, the first church in Gays Mills and in 1898 the church building itself was finished. In the years between 1848 and 1865, many families moved into the community, which came to be known as Gays Mills in honor of the founder and his brothers.

Gays Mills was also the home of the Twining apple-growing family. One of the Twinings took his apples to the World's Fair, where they were a great success, generating mild fame for Gays Mills. Twining and his companions are honored with a historical marker on a hill overlooking the village. Consequently, apples are grown heavily in Crawford County, with numerous commercial orchards surrounding the village.

=== Flooding ===
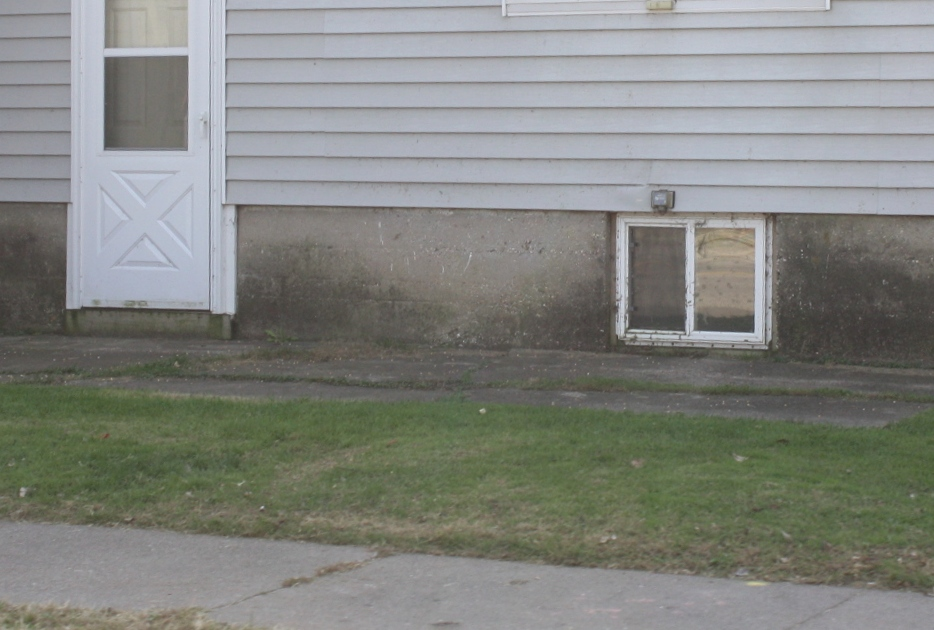
Flood damage in 2010

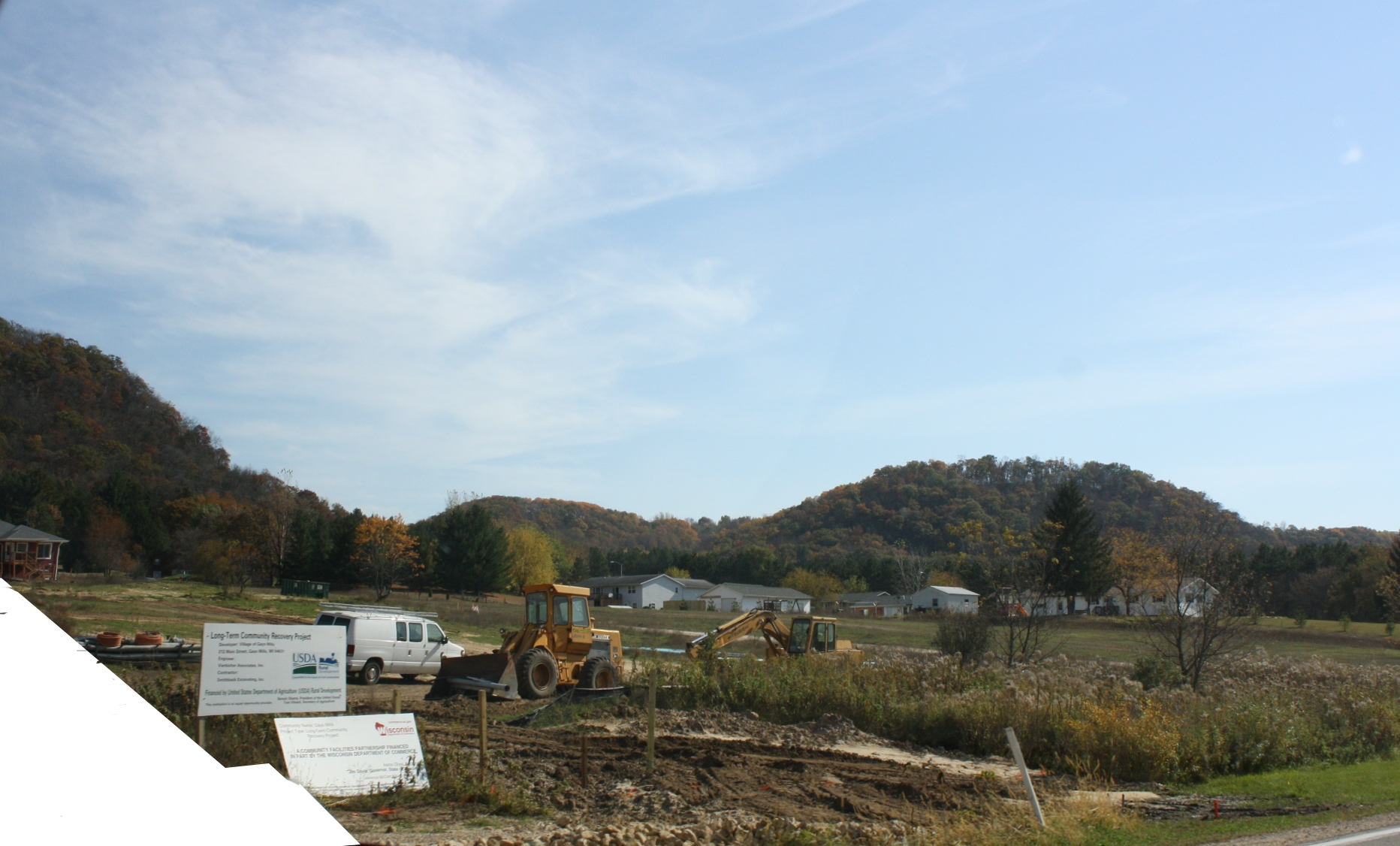
Relocation beginning in mid-2010

Almost 60 homes were substantially damaged by flooding on the Kickapoo River in 2007 and 2008. In 2008, a meeting was held to discuss moving the village to higher ground because of repeated flooding, which damaged the local economy. In October 2008, the Federal Emergency Management Agency (FEMA) released a 72-page report asking residents and businesses to relocate from the Kickapoo River flood plain. Relocation is estimated to cost $1.7 million to purchase 30 acres (120,000 m^{2}) 1-mile (1.6 km) north of the existing location. About 150 of the village's 230 houses lie in the flood plain. As of October 2008, village leaders were considering what course to take.

In March 2010, a grant of $4.31 million was awarded by the Economic Development Administration to the Village of Gays Mills and the Redevelopment Authority of Gays Mills to develop a strategy for relocating the Village’s commercial district outside of the floodplain.

In September 2016, July 2017, and August 2018 Gays Mills was once again hit by flooding.

== Geography ==
Gays Mills is located at 43°19′6″N 90°50′48″W (43.318241, -90.846554).

According to the United States Census Bureau, the village has a total area of 4.90 square miles (12.69 km^{2}), of which 4.87 square miles (12.61 km^{2}) is land and 0.03 square miles (0.08 km^{2}) is water.

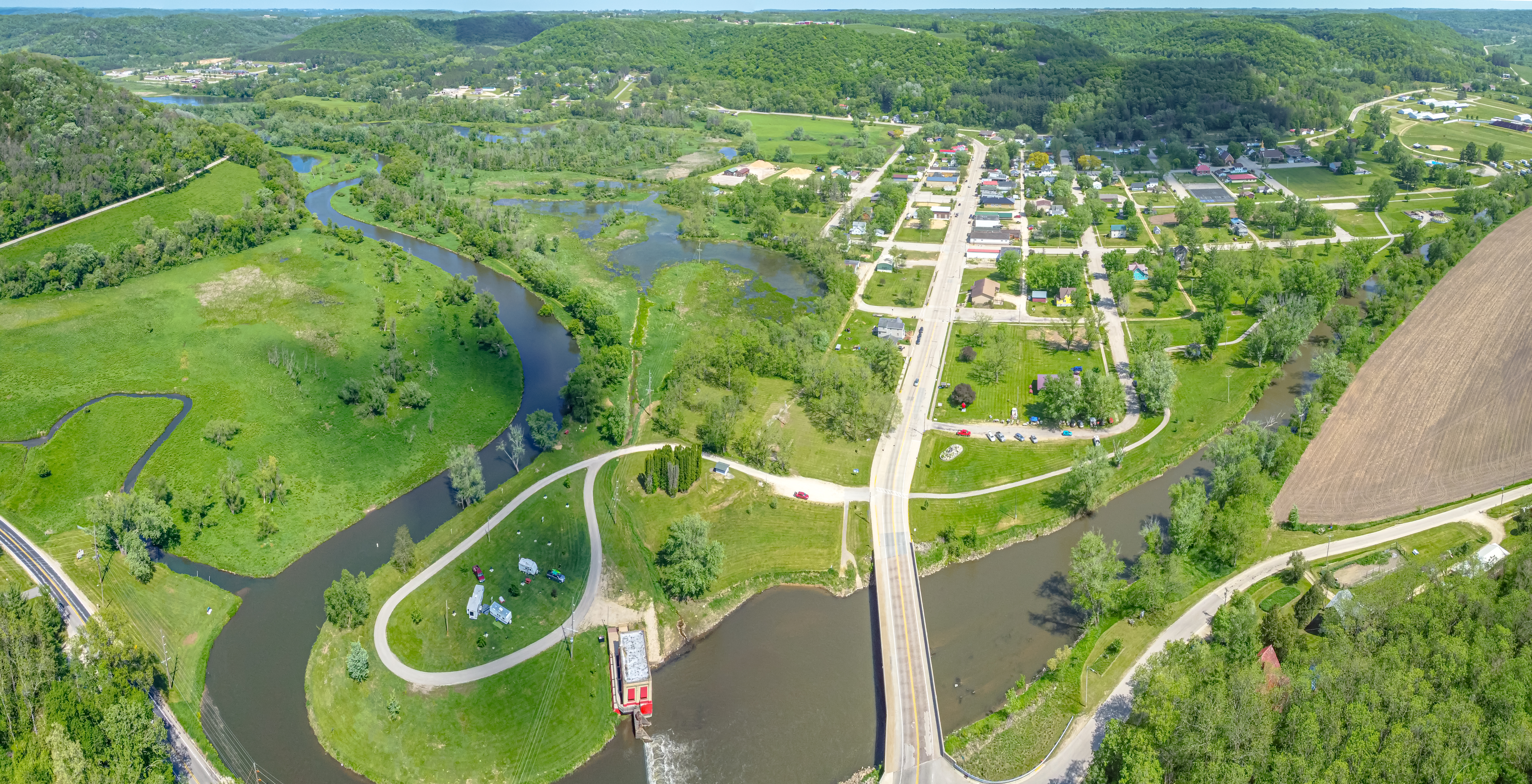
Kickapoo River, Wis-171, and Wis-131 run through town

== Climate ==
According to the Köppen Climate Classification system, Gays Mills has a hot-summer humid continental climate, abbreviated "Dfa" on climate maps. The hottest temperature recorded in Gays Mills was 103 °F (39.4 °C) on August 14, 1998, while the coldest temperature recorded was −48 °F (−44.4 °C) on February 3–4, 1996.

Climate data for Gays Mills, Wisconsin, 1991–2020 normals, extremes 1986–present
Month	Jan	Feb	Mar	Apr	May	Jun	Jul	Aug	Sep	Oct	Nov	Dec	Year
Record high °F (°C)	60 (16)	69 (21)	84 (29)	89 (32)	96 (36)	100 (38)	102 (39)	103 (39)	98 (37)	89 (32)	75 (24)	69 (21)	103 (39)
Mean maximum °F (°C)	45.8 (7.7)	51.5 (10.8)	66.4 (19.1)	79.2 (26.2)	86.3 (30.2)	91.1 (32.8)	92.1 (33.4)	90.9 (32.7)	87.3 (30.7)	80.5 (26.9)	64.5 (18.1)	50.8 (10.4)	94.1 (34.5)
Mean daily maximum °F (°C)	27.3 (−2.6)	32.1 (0.1)	44.8 (7.1)	58.3 (14.6)	70.1 (21.2)	79.7 (26.5)	83.2 (28.4)	81.5 (27.5)	74.2 (23.4)	60.9 (16.1)	45.3 (7.4)	32.7 (0.4)	57.5 (14.2)
Daily mean °F (°C)	17.1 (−8.3)	21.5 (−5.8)	34.1 (1.2)	46.4 (8.0)	58.0 (14.4)	68.2 (20.1)	72.0 (22.2)	70.2 (21.2)	62.0 (16.7)	49.1 (9.5)	35.8 (2.1)	23.9 (−4.5)	46.5 (8.1)
Mean daily minimum °F (°C)	7.0 (−13.9)	10.9 (−11.7)	23.4 (−4.8)	34.5 (1.4)	46.0 (7.8)	56.7 (13.7)	60.9 (16.1)	58.9 (14.9)	49.9 (9.9)	37.3 (2.9)	26.3 (−3.2)	15.1 (−9.4)	35.6 (2.0)
Mean minimum °F (°C)	−20.4 (−29.1)	−11.9 (−24.4)	−0.4 (−18.0)	18.9 (−7.3)	29.8 (−1.2)	41.7 (5.4)	49.1 (9.5)	47.4 (8.6)	34.0 (1.1)	21.9 (−5.6)	8.2 (−13.2)	−8.9 (−22.7)	−24.8 (−31.6)
Record low °F (°C)	−45 (−43)	−48 (−44)	−23 (−31)	10 (−12)	20 (−7)	34 (1)	44 (7)	38 (3)	24 (−4)	9 (−13)	−10 (−23)	−33 (−36)	−48 (−44)
Average precipitation inches (mm)	1.32 (34)	1.17 (30)	2.03 (52)	3.89 (99)	4.24 (108)	5.56 (141)	4.83 (123)	4.43 (113)	3.90 (99)	2.68 (68)	2.10 (53)	1.55 (39)	37.70 (958)
Average snowfall inches (cm)	10.8 (27)	7.8 (20)	5.9 (15)	1.6 (4.1)	0.0 (0.0)	0.0 (0.0)	0.0 (0.0)	0.0 (0.0)	0.0 (0.0)	0.1 (0.25)	1.9 (4.8)	9.7 (25)	37.8 (96.15)
Average precipitation days (≥ 0.01 in)	8.1	6.4	7.6	9.2	10.7	10.6	8.4	8.1	8.2	7.8	6.6	7.2	98.9
Average snowy days (≥ 0.1 in)	6.0	4.7	3.0	0.8	0.0	0.0	0.0	0.0	0.0	0.1	1.7	5.0	21.3
Source 1: NOAA
Source 2: National Weather Service

== Demographics ==
Historical population
Census	Pop.	Note	%±
1910	557		—
1920	652		17.1%
1930	579		−11.2%
1940	737		27.3%
1950	662		−10.2%
1960	634		−4.2%
1970	623		−1.7%
1980	627		0.6%
1990	578		−7.8%
2000	625		8.1%
2010	491		−21.4%
2020	523		6.5%
U.S. Decennial Census

=== 2010 census ===
As of the census of 2010, there were 491 people, 226 households, and 132 families residing in the village. The population density was 100.8 inhabitants per square mile (38.9/km^{2}). There were 270 housing units at an average density of 55.4 per square mile (21.4/km^{2}). The racial makeup of the village was 97.1% White, 1.4% African American, 0.2% Native American, and 1.2% from two or more races. Hispanic or Latino of any race were 0.2% of the population.

There were 226 households, of which 25.7% had children under the age of 18 living with them, 40.3% were married couples living together, 12.4% had a female householder with no husband present, 5.8% had a male householder with no wife present, and 41.6% were non-families. 38.5% of all households were made up of individuals, and 18.6% had someone living alone who was 65 years of age or older. The average household size was 2.17 and the average family size was 2.88.

The median age in the village was 47.5 years. 23.8% of residents were under the age of 18; 5.6% were between the ages of 18 and 24; 18.1% were from 25 to 44; 32.4% were from 45 to 64; and 20.2% were 65 years of age or older. The gender makeup of the village was 45.8% male and 54.2% female.

=== 2000 census ===
As of the census of 2000, there were 625 people, 261 households, and 169 families residing in the village. The population density was 136.0 people per square mile (52.5/km^{2}). There were 289 housing units at an average density of 62.9 per square mile (24.3/km^{2}). The racial makeup of the village was 99.68% White, 0.16% African American and 0.16% Asian. Hispanic or Latino of any race were 0.48% of the population.

There were 261 households, out of which 32.6% had children under the age of 18 living with them, 50.6% were married couples living together, 11.5% had a female householder with no husband present, and 35.2% were non-families. 32.2% of all households were made up of individuals, and 19.9% had someone living alone who was 65 years of age or older. The average household size was 2.39 and the average family size was 3.04.

In the village, the population was spread out, with 27.0% under the age of 18, 6.4% from 18 to 24, 25.1% from 25 to 44, 23.0% from 45 to 64, and 18.4% who were 65 years of age or older. The median age was 40 years. For every 100 females, there were 82.7 males. For every 100 females age 18 and over, there were 79.5 males.

The median income for a household in the village was $29,250, and the median income for a family was $36,607. Males had a median income of $32,875 versus $18,295 for females. The per capita income for the village was $17,786. About 11.2% of families and 15.8% of the population were below the poverty line, including 16.0% of those under age 18 and 13.2% of those age 65 or over.

== Images ==
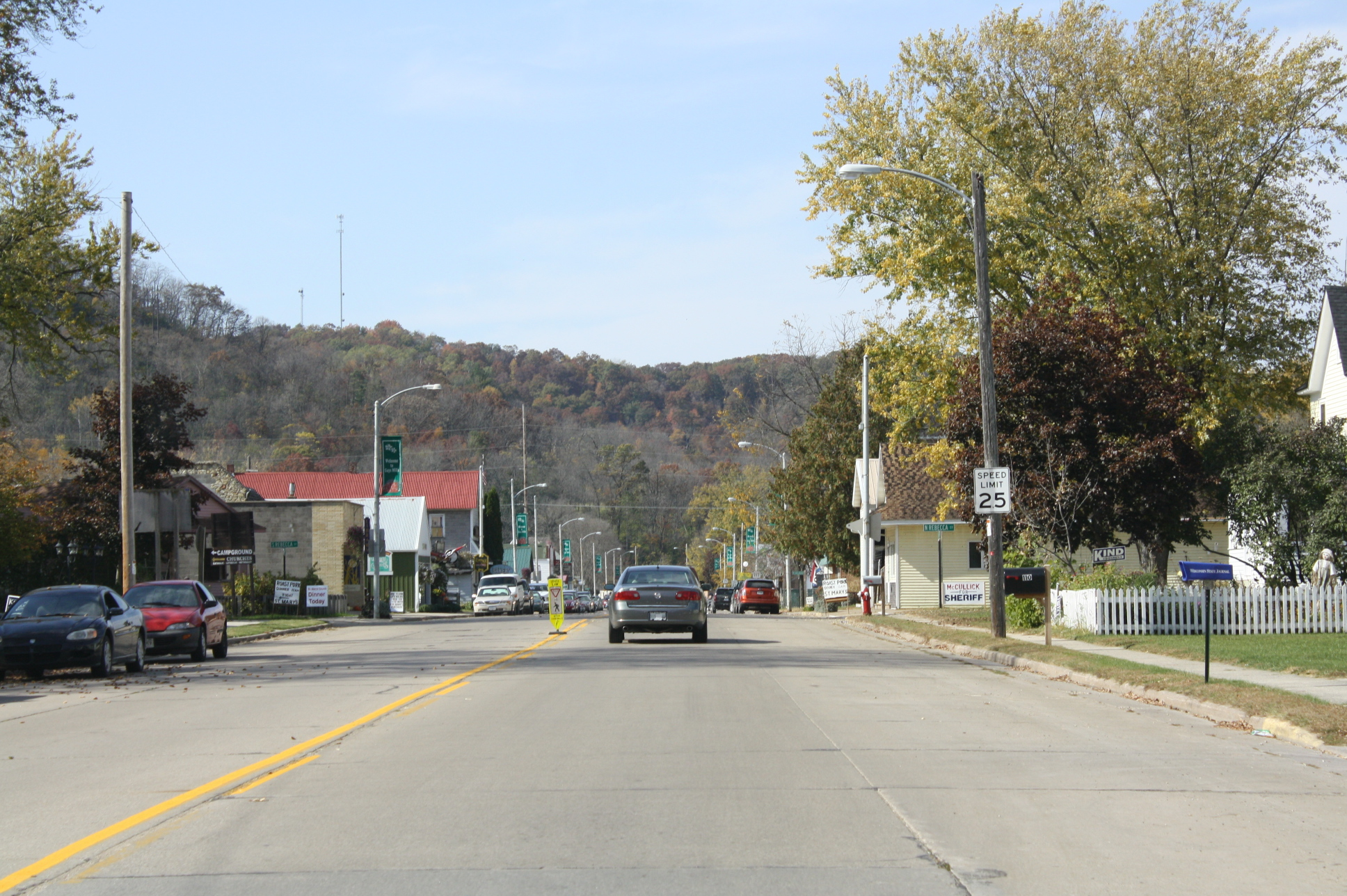
Looking west at downtown Gays Mills in 2010

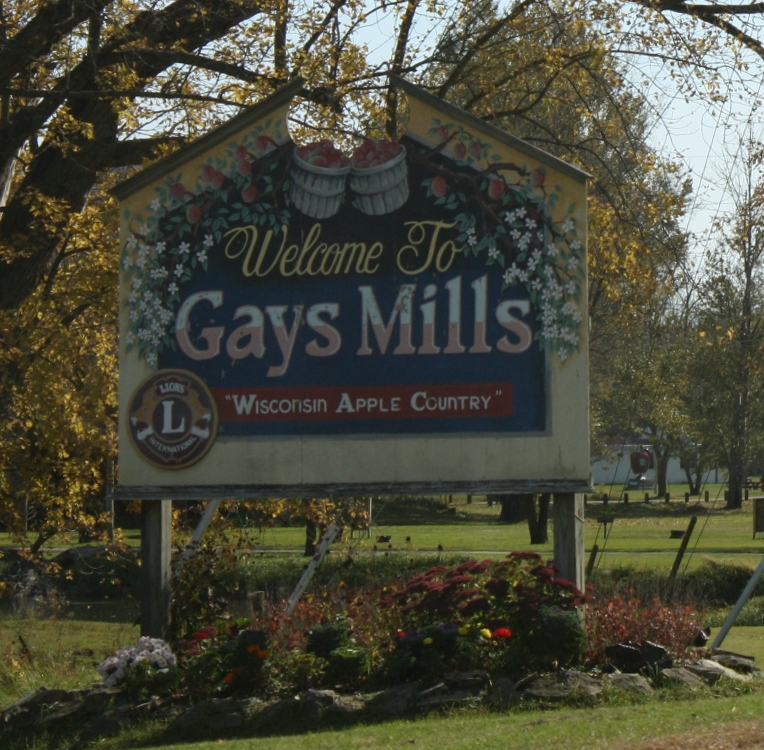
City welcome sign

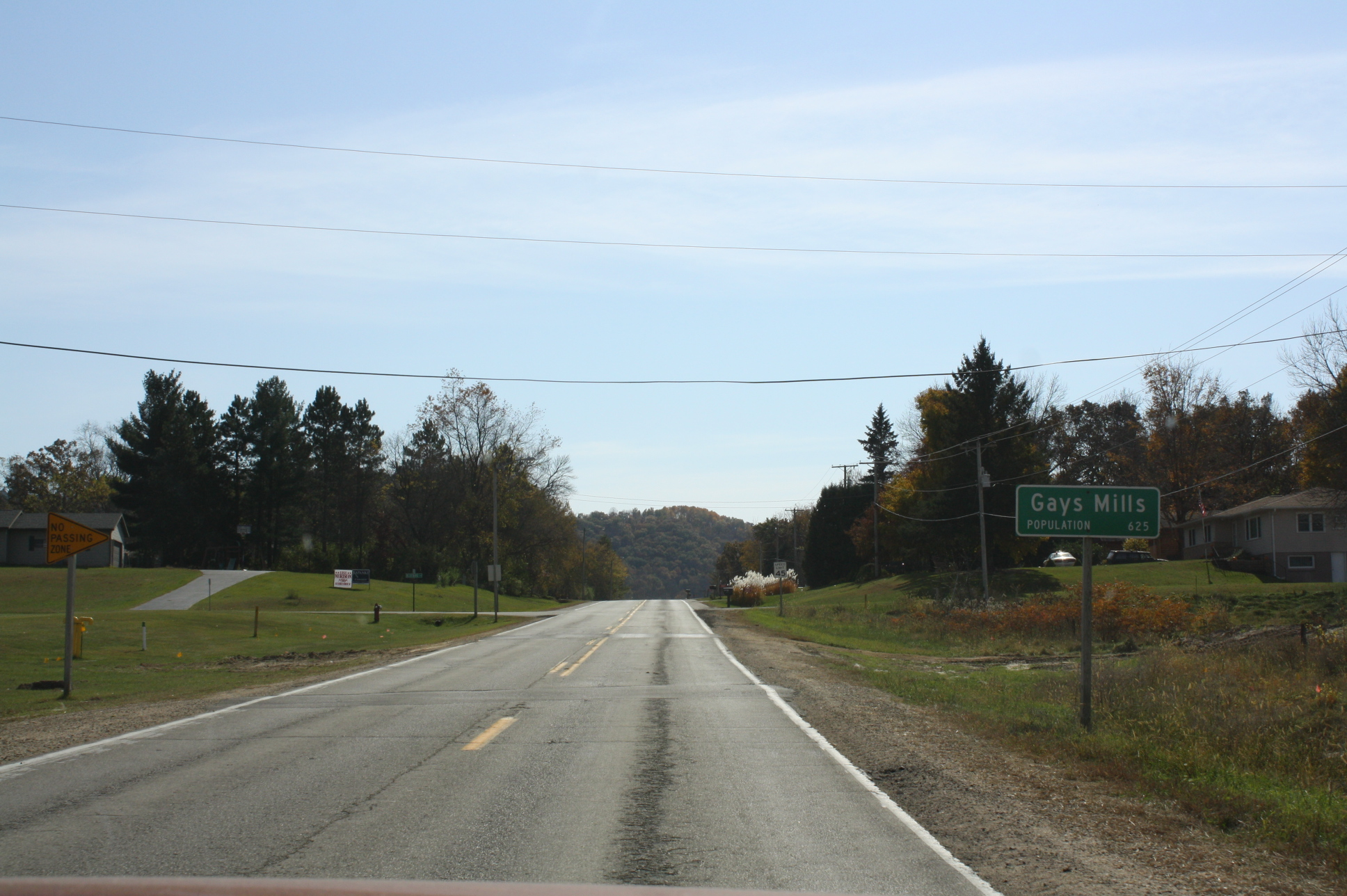
Sign for Gays Mills on WIS 131

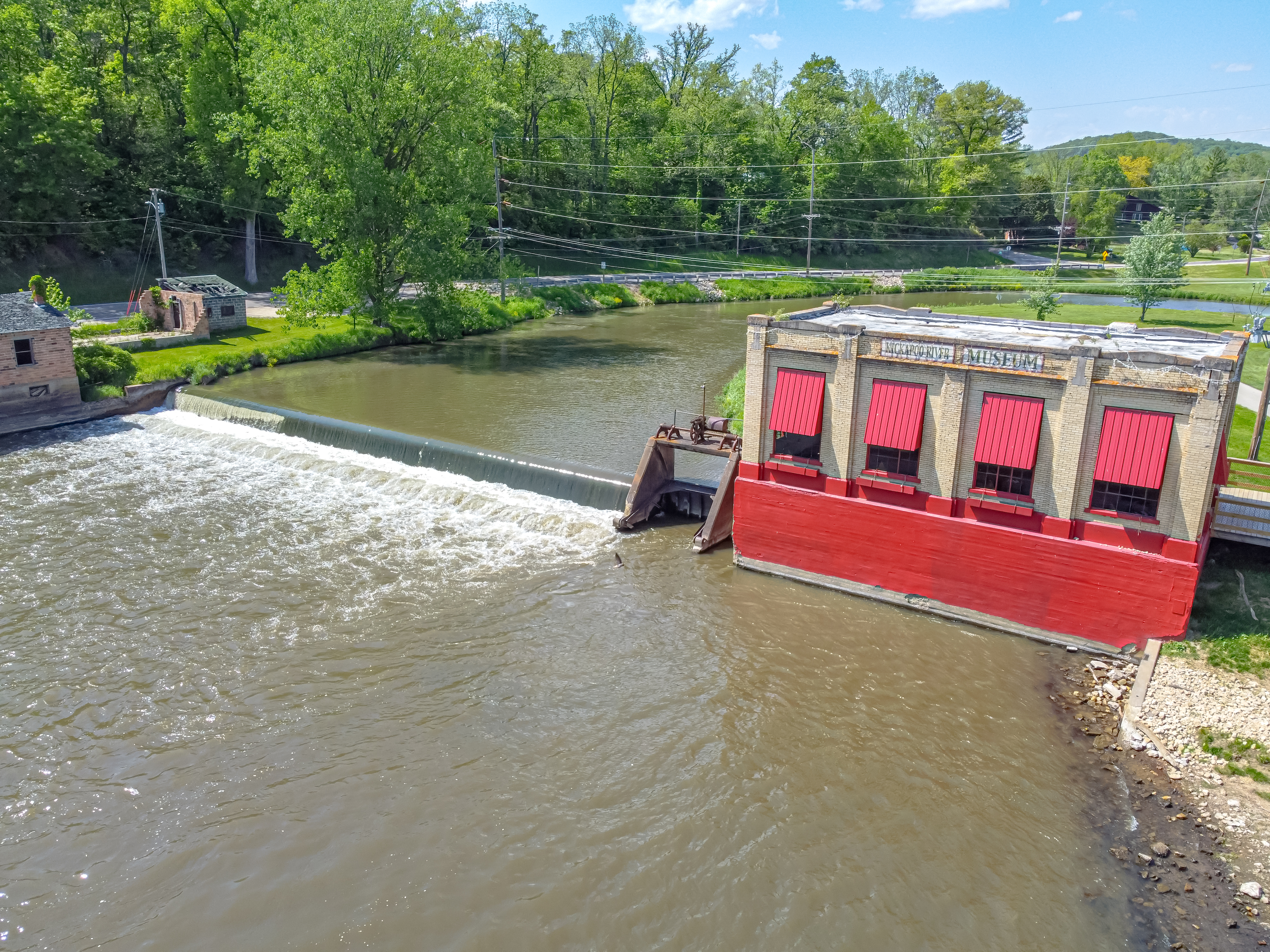
Dam on the Kickapoo River

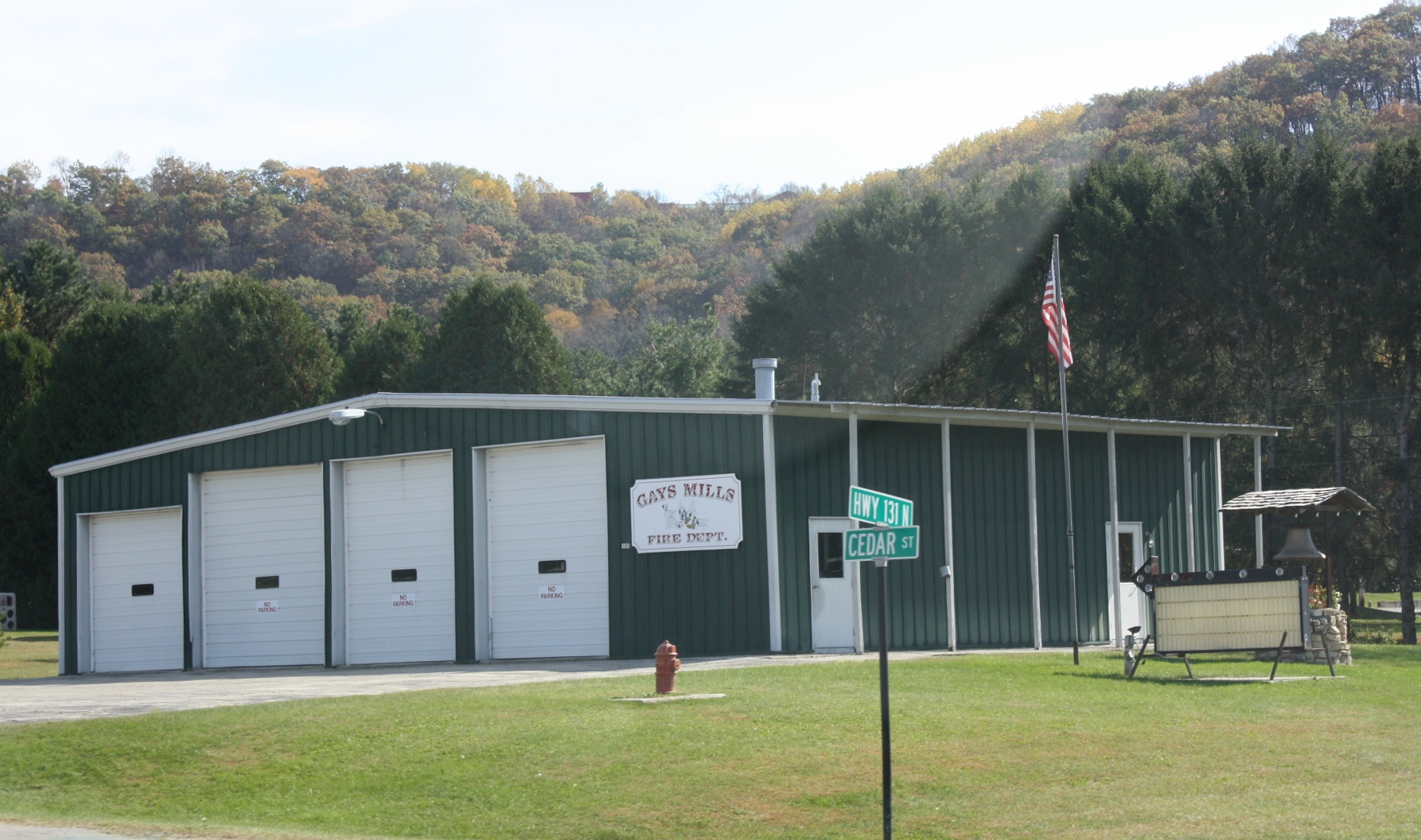
Fire department

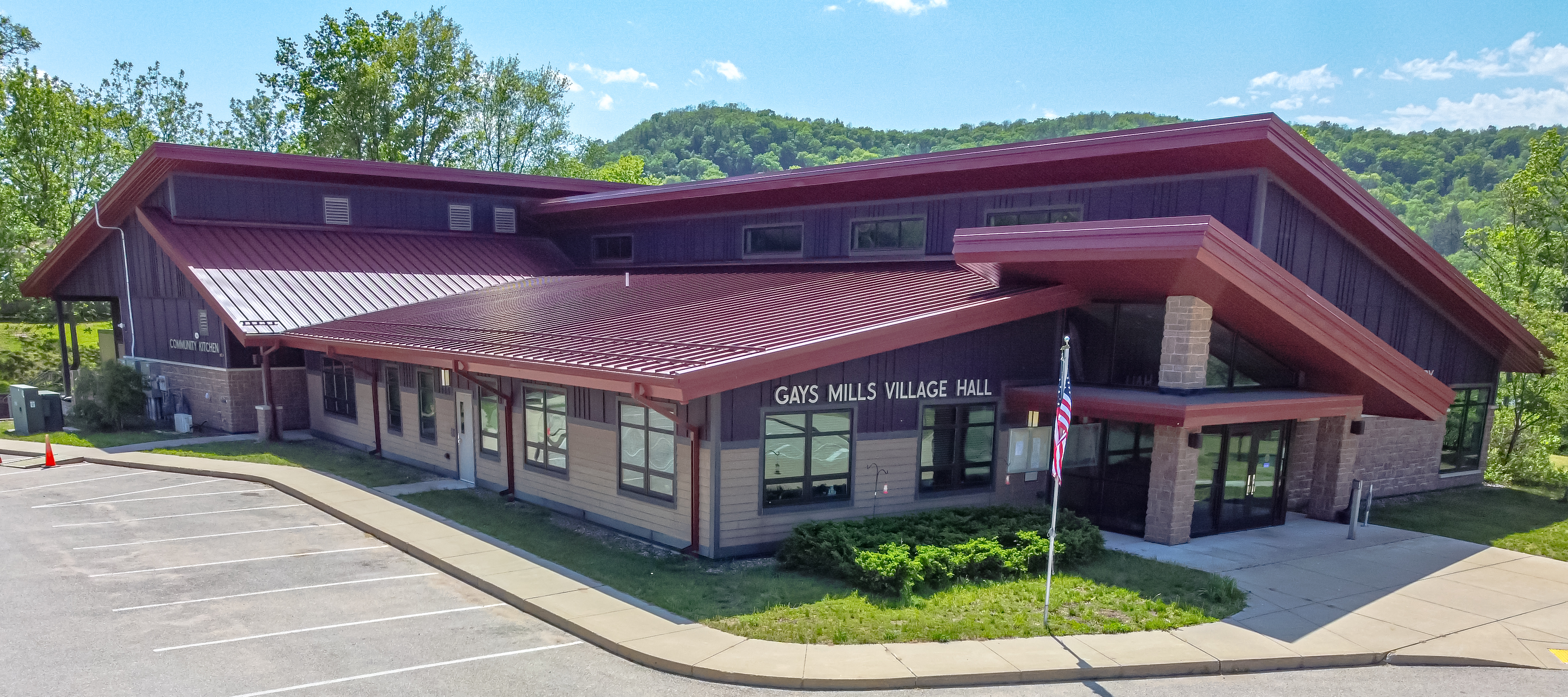
Village Hall, library, and community kitchen
