= Readstown, Wisconsin =

- Village
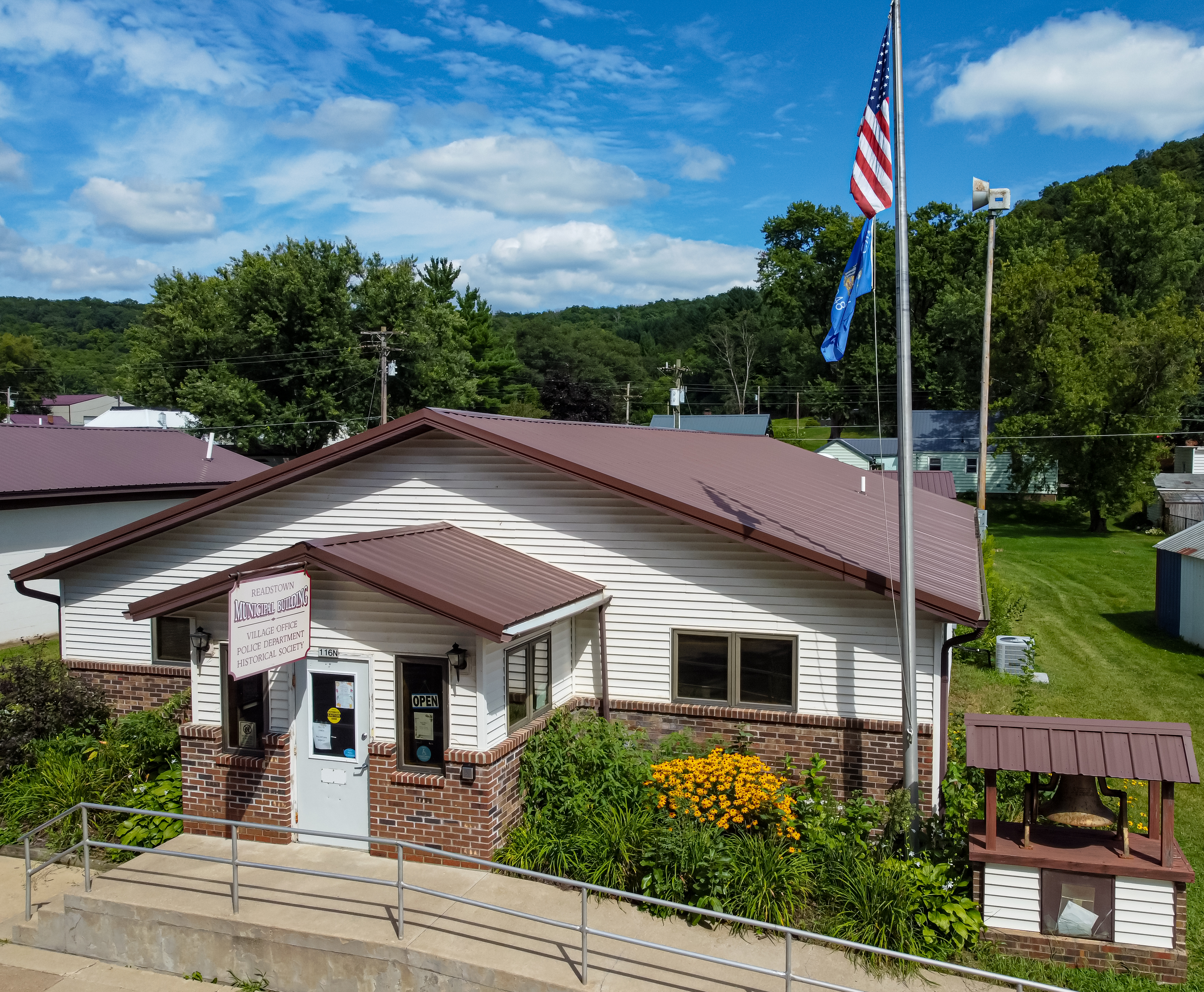
- Village hall

- Location of Readstown in Vernon County, Wisconsin.
- Coordinates: 43°26′55″N 90°45′39″W
- Country: United States
- State: Wisconsin
- County: Vernon

Area
  - Total: 1.73 sq mi (4.49 km^{2})
  - Land: 1.71 sq mi (4.43 km^{2})
  - Water: 0.019 sq mi (0.05 km^{2})
- Elevation: 761 ft (232 m)

Population (2020)
  - Total: 376
  - Density: 243.1/sq mi (93.86/km^{2})
- Time zone: UTC-6 (Central (CST))
  - Summer (DST): UTC-5 (CDT)
- Area code: 608
- FIPS code: 55-66450
- GNIS feature ID: 1572122
- Website: vi.readstown.wi.gov

Readstown is a village in Vernon County, Wisconsin, United States. The population was 376 at the 2020 census.

== Geography ==
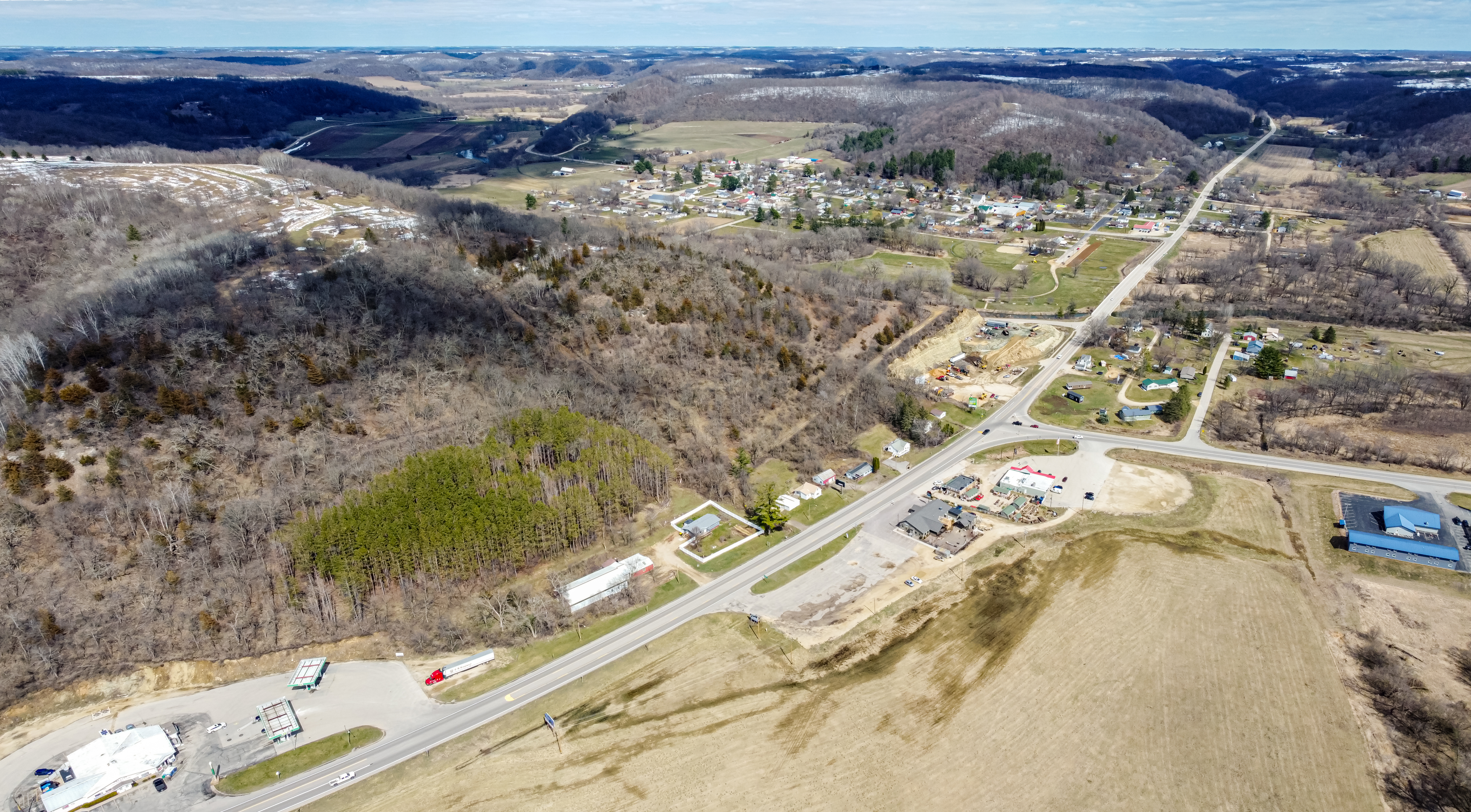
US-14/61 and Wis-131 junction in town

Readstown is located at 43°26′55″N 90°45′39″W (43.448544, -90.760708).

According to the United States Census Bureau, the village has a total area of 1.79 square miles (4.64 km^{2}), of which 1.77 square miles (4.58 km^{2}) is land and 0.02 square miles (0.05 km^{2}) is water.

== Demographics ==
Historical population
Census	Pop.	Note	%±
1900	403		—
1910	515		27.8%
1920	546		6.0%
1930	544		−0.4%
1940	584		7.4%
1950	541		−7.4%
1960	469		−13.3%
1970	395		−15.8%
1980	396		0.3%
1990	420		6.1%
2000	395		−6.0%
2010	415		5.1%
2020	376		−9.4%
U.S. Decennial Census

=== 2010 census ===
At the 2010 census there were 415 people, 186 households, and 99 families living in the village. The population density was 234.5 inhabitants per square mile (90.5/km^{2}). There were 213 housing units at an average density of 120.3 per square mile (46.4/km^{2}). The racial makup of the village was 96.4% White, 1.4% African American, 0.2% Native American, 1.0% Asian, and 1.0% from two or more races. Hispanic or Latino of any race were 1.2%.

Of the 186 households 25.3% had children under the age of 18 living with them, 39.2% were married couples living together, 9.7% had a female householder with no husband present, 4.3% had a male householder with no wife present, and 46.8% were non-families. 38.7% of households were one person and 23.1% were one person aged 65 or older. The average household size was 2.20 and the average family size was 2.99.

The median age in the village was 44.9 years. 20.7% of residents were under the age of 18; 5.5% were between the ages of 18 and 24; 24.1% were from 25 to 44; 30.7% were from 45 to 64; and 19% were 65 or older. The gender makeup of the village was 46.0% male and 54.0% female.

=== 2000 census ===
At the 2000 census there were 395 people, 187 households, and 104 families living in the village. The population density was 221.0 people per square mile (85.2/km^{2}). There were 216 housing units at an average density of 120.8 per square mile (46.6/km^{2}). The racial makup of the village was 100.00% White. Of the 187 households 22.5% had children under the age of 18 living with them, 41.7% were married couples living together, 8.0% had a female householder with no husband present, and 43.9% were non-families. 36.9% of households were one person and 25.1% were one person aged 65 or older. The average household size was 2.11 and the average family size was 2.73.

The age distribution was 21.0% under the age of 18, 7.6% from 18 to 24, 24.3% from 25 to 44, 24.8% from 45 to 64, and 22.3% 65 or older. The median age was 43 years. For every 100 females, there were 85.4 males. For every 100 females age 18 and over, there were 80.3 males.

The median household income was $21,250 and the median family income was $28,125. Males had a median income of $26,250 versus $18,889 for females. The per capita income for the village was $12,957. About 9.3% of families and 21.2% of the population were below the poverty line, including 27.8% of those under age 18 and 21.4% of those age 65 or over.

== See also ==
- Kickapoo River
- Kickapoo, Wisconsin
