= Bell Center, Wisconsin =

- Village
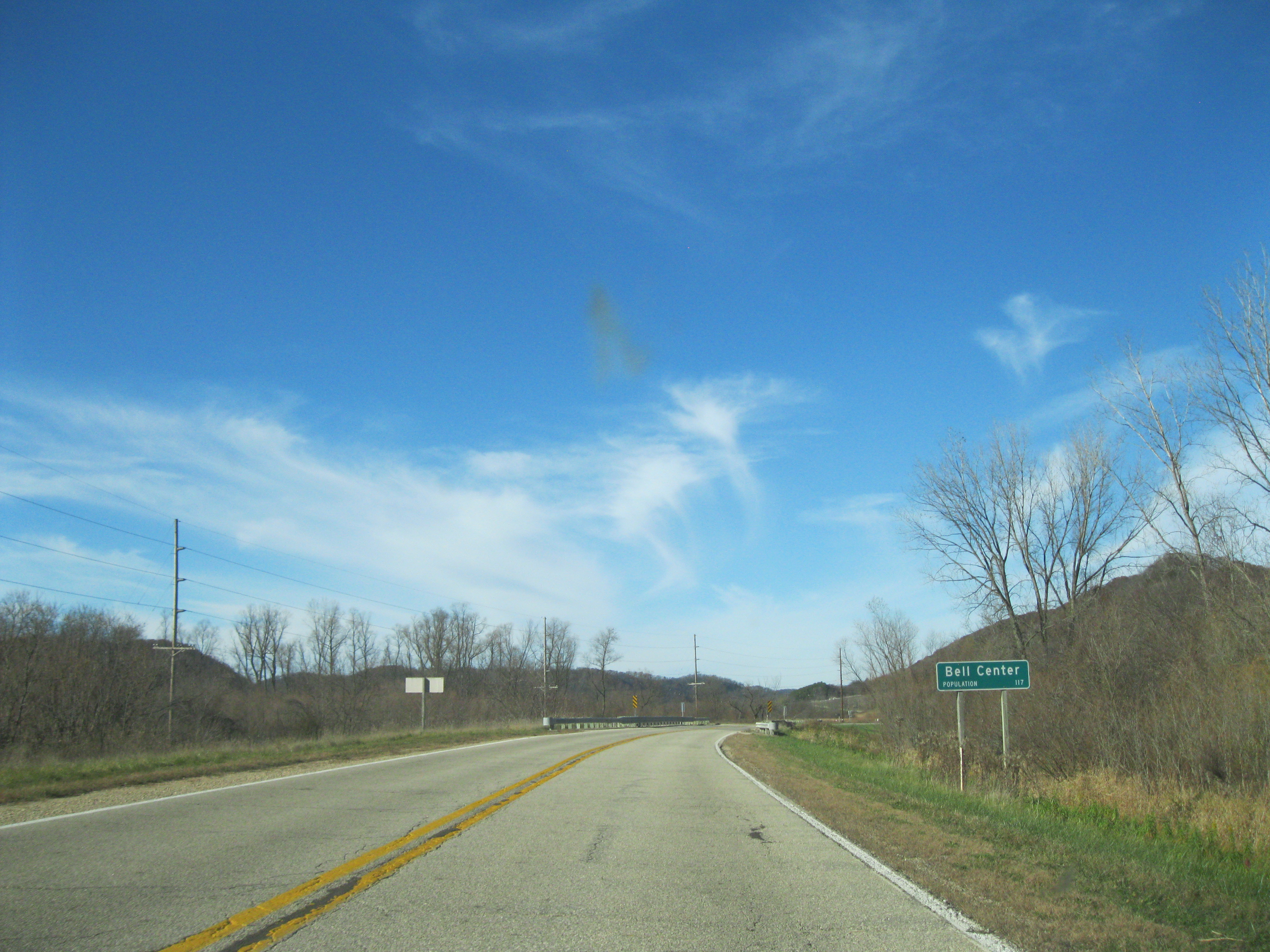
- Entering Bell Center from the south on WIS 131

- Location of Bell Center in Crawford County, Wisconsin.
- Coordinates: 43°17′31″N 90°49′50″W
- Country: United States
- State: Wisconsin
- County: Crawford

Area
  - Total: 5.59 sq mi (14.47 km^{2})
  - Land: 5.55 sq mi (14.37 km^{2})
  - Water: 0.039 sq mi (0.10 km^{2})
- Elevation: 719 ft (219 m)

Population (2020)
  - Total: 108
  - Density: 19.5/sq mi (7.52/km^{2})
- Time zone: UTC-6 (Central (CST))
  - Summer (DST): UTC-5 (CDT)
- Area code: 608
- FIPS code: 55-06225
- GNIS feature ID: 1561521

Bell Center is a village in Crawford County, Wisconsin, United States. The population was 108 at the 2020 census, down from 117 at the 2010 census.

== History ==
Bell Center was named after early settler Dennis Bell.

== Geography ==
Bell Center is located at 43°17′31″N 90°49′50″W (43.291992, -90.830489).

According to the United States Census Bureau, the village has a total area of 5.59 square miles (14.48 km^{2}), of which 5.55 square miles (14.37 km^{2}) is land and 0.04 square miles (0.10 km^{2}) is water.

== Demographics ==
Historical population
Census	Pop.	Note	%±
1880	94		—
1910	216		—
1920	210		−2.8%
1930	177		−15.7%
1940	264		49.2%
1950	195		−26.1%
1960	155		−20.5%
1970	110		−29.0%
1980	124		12.7%
1990	127		2.4%
2000	116		−8.7%
2010	117		0.9%
2020	108		−7.7%
U.S. Decennial Census

=== 2010 census ===
As of the census of 2010, there were 117 people, 45 households, and 33 families living in the village. The population density was 21.1 inhabitants per square mile (8.1/km^{2}). There were 64 housing units at an average density of 11.5 per square mile (4.4/km^{2}). The racial makeup of the village was 98.3% White, 0.9% African American, and 0.9% from two or more races.

There were 45 households, of which 31.1% had children under the age of 18 living with them, 48.9% were married couples living together, 15.6% had a female householder with no husband present, 8.9% had a male householder with no wife present, and 26.7% were non-families. 26.7% of all households were made up of individuals, and 11.1% had someone living alone who was 65 years of age or older. The average household size was 2.60 and the average family size was 2.97.

The median age in the village was 40.5 years. 29.9% of residents were under the age of 18; 2.6% were between the ages of 18 and 24; 20.4% were from 25 to 44; 27.4% were from 45 to 64; and 19.7% were 65 years of age or older. The gender makeup of the village was 54.7% male and 45.3% female.

=== 2000 census ===
As of the census of 2000, there were 116 people, 45 households, and 32 families living in the village. The population density was 21.0 people per square mile (8.1/km^{2}). There were 60 housing units at an average density of 10.9 per square mile (4.2/km^{2}). The racial makeup of the village was 99.14% White and 0.86% Asian.

There were 45 households, out of which 33.3% had children under the age of 18 living with them, 66.7% were married couples living together, 4.4% had a female householder with no husband present, and 26.7% were non-families. 22.2% of all households were made up of individuals, and 6.7% had someone living alone who was 65 years of age or older. The average household size was 2.58 and the average family size was 3.06.

In the village, the population was spread out, with 26.7% under the age of 18, 3.4% from 18 to 24, 25.9% from 25 to 44, 28.4% from 45 to 64, and 15.5% who were 65 years of age or older. The median age was 40 years. For every 100 females, there were 107.1 males. For every 100 females age 18 and over, there were 102.4 males.

The median income for a household in the village was $39,167, and the median income for a family was $50,000. Males had a median income of $30,000 versus $20,625 for females. The per capita income for the village was $23,177. There were 19.4% of families and 19.7% of the population living below the poverty line, including 21.6% of under eighteens and 33.3% of those over 64.

== Notable people ==
- Thomas Curley, former Union Civil War general from Missouri, became a farmer here, and was elected to the Wisconsin State Assembly for two terms.
