= Steuben, Wisconsin =

- Village
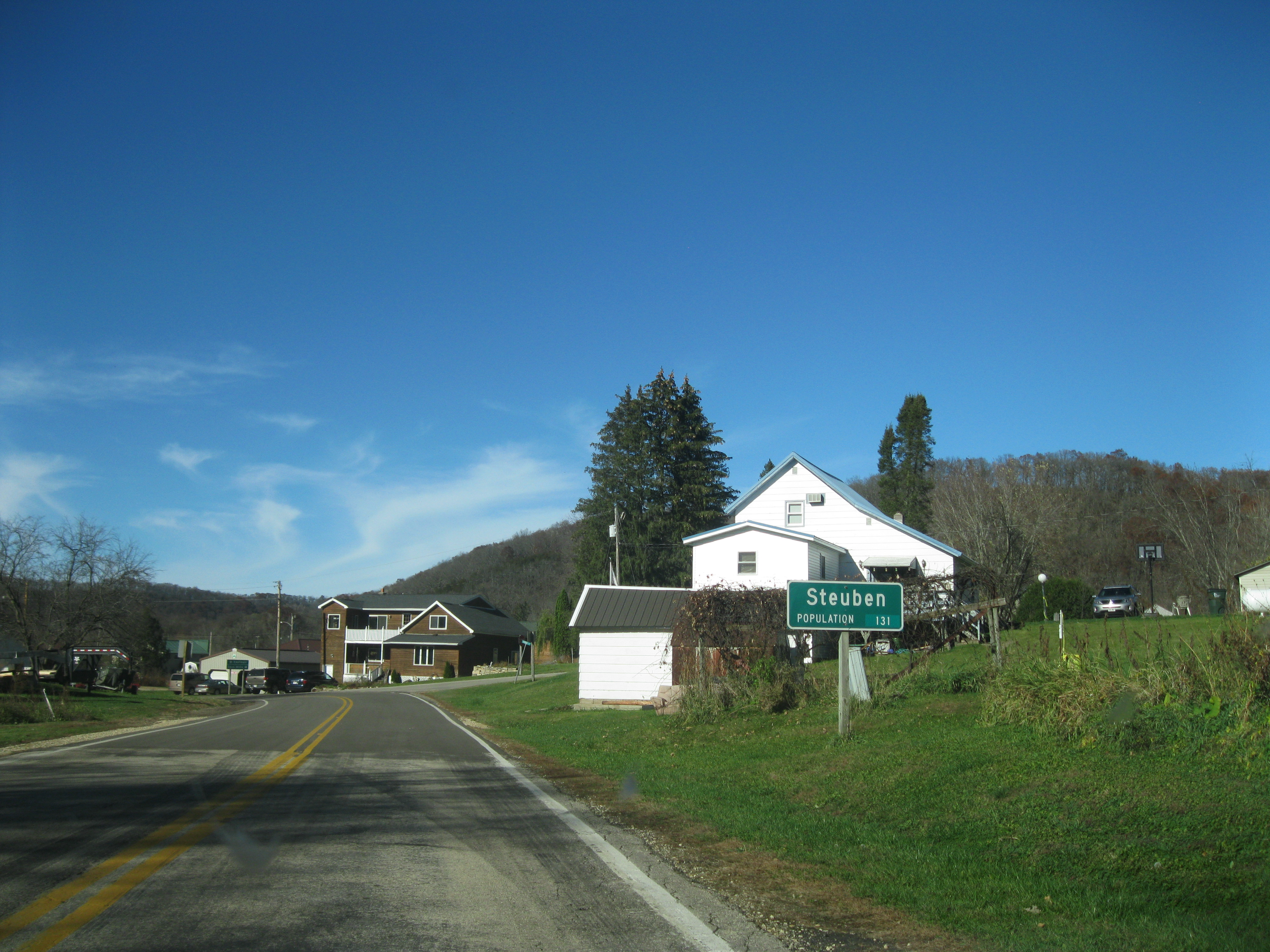
- Entering Steuben from the south on WIS 131

- Location of Steuben in Crawford County, Wisconsin.
- Coordinates: 43°10′52″N 90°51′33″W
- Country: United States
- State: Wisconsin
- County: Crawford

Government
  - Type: Village
  - Village President: Shawn Pickett

Area
  - Total: 6.19 sq mi (16.04 km^{2})
  - Land: 6.19 sq mi (16.04 km^{2})
  - Water: 0 sq mi (0.00 km^{2})
- Elevation: 676 ft (206 m)

Population (2020)
  - Total: 122
  - Density: 19.7/sq mi (7.61/km^{2})
- Time zone: UTC-6 (Central (CST))
  - Summer (DST): UTC-5 (CDT)
- Postal code: 54657
- Area code: 608
- FIPS code: 55-77175
- GNIS feature ID: 1574872

Steuben is a village in Crawford County, Wisconsin, United States. The population was 122 at the 2020 census.

== Geography ==
Steuben is located at 43°10′52″N 90°51′33″W (43.181190, -90.859068).

According to the United States Census Bureau, the village has a total area of 6.19 square miles (16.03 km^{2}), all land.

== Demographics ==
Historical population
Census	Pop.	Note	%±
1910	237		—
1920	305		28.7%
1930	262		−14.1%
1940	321		22.5%
1950	264		−17.8%
1960	193		−26.9%
1970	179		−7.3%
1980	175		−2.2%
1990	161		−8.0%
2000	177		9.9%
2010	131		−26.0%
2020	122		−6.9%
U.S. Decennial Census

=== 2010 census ===
As of the census of 2010, there were 131 people, 51 households, and 34 families living in the village. The population density was 21.2 inhabitants per square mile (8.2/km^{2}). There were 64 housing units at an average density of 10.3 per square mile (4.0/km^{2}). The racial makeup of the village was 99.2% White and 0.8% Native American.

There were 51 households, of which 41.2% had children under the age of 18 living with them, 52.9% were married couples living together, 9.8% had a female householder with no husband present, 3.9% had a male householder with no wife present, and 33.3% were non-families. 29.4% of all households were made up of individuals, and 19.6% had someone living alone who was 65 years of age or older. The average household size was 2.57 and the average family size was 3.12.

The median age in the village was 34.8 years. 30.5% of residents were under the age of 18; 5.4% were between the ages of 18 and 24; 32.1% were from 25 to 44; 19.8% were from 45 to 64; and 12.2% were 65 years of age or older. The gender makeup of the village was 51.1% male and 48.9% female.

=== 2000 census ===
As of the census of 2000, there were 177 people, 61 households, and 45 families living in the village. The population density was 28.6 people per square mile (11.0/km^{2}). There were 72 housing units at an average density of 11.6 per square mile (4.5/km^{2}). The racial makeup of the village was 99.44% White and 0.56% Native American. Hispanic or Latino of any race were 0.56% of the population.

There were 61 households, out of which 47.5% had children under the age of 18 living with them, 63.9% were married couples living together, 4.9% had a female householder with no husband present, and 24.6% were non-families. 23.0% of all households were made up of individuals, and 9.8% had someone living alone who was 65 years of age or older. The average household size was 2.90 and the average family size was 3.35.

In the village, the population was spread out, with 32.2% under the age of 18, 9.0% from 18 to 24, 29.9% from 25 to 44, 16.9% from 45 to 64, and 11.9% who were 65 years of age or older. The median age was 31 years. For every 100 females, there were 98.9 males. For every 100 females age 18 and over, there were 106.9 males.

The median income for a household in the village was $41,250, and the median income for a family was $42,500. Males had a median income of $27,500 versus $16,563 for females. The per capita income for the village was $11,657. About 7.4% of families and 7.2% of the population were below the poverty line, including 7.4% of those under the age of eighteen and 16.0% of those 65 or over.
