= William Henry Evans =

American politician

William Henry Evans (November 3, 1842 – January 5, 1923) was an American lawyer and farmer from Yankeetown, Wisconsin, who spent a single one-year term as a Liberal Reform Party member of the Wisconsin State Assembly from Crawford County.

Although a native of Virginia, he fought as a Union Army soldier in the American Civil War.

== Background ==
Evans was born in Petersburg, Virginia, on November 3, 1842, son of Joseph and Mary (Hall) Evans. His father was a mechanic, and moved the family to several cities in the south and west in search of work. William received a common school education. He had lived at one time or another in Philadelphia, New Orleans, Natchez, Mississippi, and Cincinnati, before coming to Wisconsin in 1860 and settling in Yankeetown.

== Civil War and after ==
Evans enlisted as a private in Company 'D' of the 31st Wisconsin Volunteer Infantry Regiment August 15 of 1862. He suffered a gunshot wound on the skirmish line outside Atlanta on July 30, 1864, and was sent to a hospital in Nashville. Evans was assigned as a mounted courier for the provost marshal's office in December, and remained in that post until May, 1865, when he was relieved and sent home to be discharged (Company 'D' was mustered out on June 20, 1865). Back home in Wisconsin, he farmed while reading the law, got married, and was admitted to the bar in the Wisconsin Circuit Court at Prairie du Chien in May 1873.

== Legislative service ==
In 1873, Evans was elected to the Assembly's Crawford County seat as the candidate of the Reform or Liberal Reform Party, a short-lived coalition of Democrats, reform and Liberal Republicans, and Grangers formed in 1873, which secured the election of a Governor of Wisconsin and a number of state legislators. (Incumbent Peter Doyle, who had served as a Democrat, was the [successful] Reform nominee for Secretary of State of Wisconsin). Evans won with 1,059 votes, to 720 for Republican J. D. Jones. He was assigned to the standing committee on enrolled bills.

He was not a candidate for re-election in 1874, and was succeeded by Republican Zenas Beach.

== Later career and personal life ==
Evans practiced law in the Town of Clayton, Wisconsin, until he was elected Crawford County's district attorney in 1876. In January 1877 he moved to Prairie du Chien, the better to discharge the duties of his office. Evans was re-elected to the same office repeatedly.

In Rising Sun, Wisconsin, in May 1867, Evans married Mary J. Flannagan, a native of Ireland who had come to the United States with her family while a child. As of 1884 the couple had seven living children, five sons and two daughters.

In 1912, he is described as being in Prairie du Chien "from Chicago on his annual visit to relatives and old time neighbors and friends," accompanied by his son Frank and wife.

He is reported on ancestry.com to have died January 5, 1923, in Ryan, Iowa. The entry for him asserts that he and Mary had a total of ten children.
