= Wauzeka =

Wauzeka may refer to a town or a village in Crawford County, Wisconsin:

- Wauzeka (town), Wisconsin
- Wauzeka (village), Wisconsin
