= Rolling Ground, Wisconsin =

- Unincorporated community
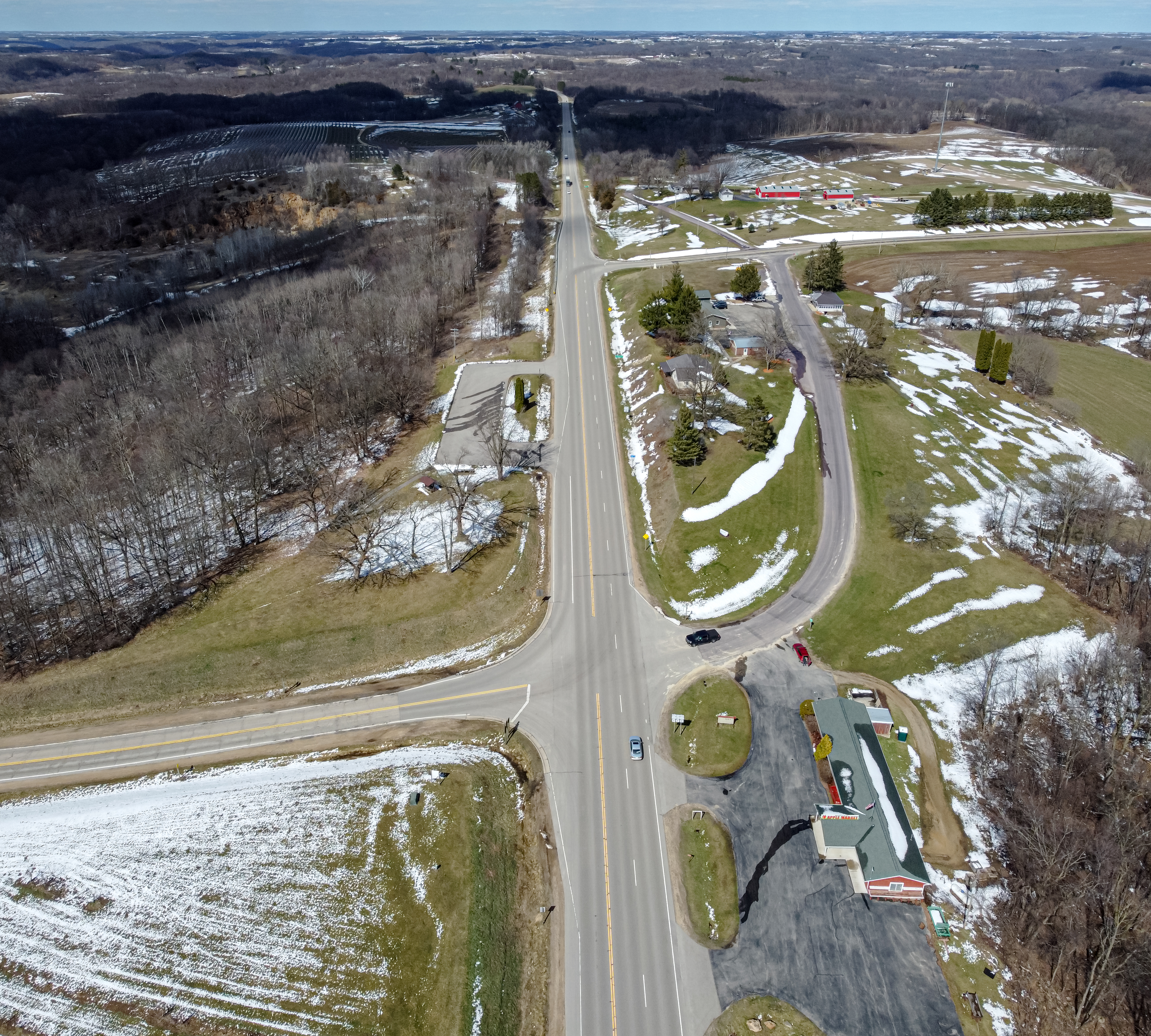

- Location within Wisconsin Location within the United States
- Coordinates: 43°19′46″N 90°44′25″W
- Country: United States
- State: Wisconsin
- County: Crawford
- Town: Clayton
- Elevation: 1,204 ft (367 m)
- Time zone: UTC-6 (Central (CST))
  - Summer (DST): UTC-5 (CDT)
- Area code: 608
- GNIS feature ID: 1572549

Rolling Ground is a small unincorporated community in the town of Clayton in Crawford County, Wisconsin, United States. Rolling Ground is a part of the Great Rivers Snowmobile Tour.

== Geography ==
The community is located at the intersection of State Highway 171 and US Route 61 between Soldiers Grove, and Mount Zion.
