= Utica, Wisconsin =

Utica is the name of some places in the U.S. state of Wisconsin:

- Utica, Crawford County, Wisconsin, a town
- Utica, Winnebago County, Wisconsin, a town
- Utica, Dane County, Wisconsin, an unincorporated community
