= Cyrus L. Lathrop =

American politician

Cyrus Lincoln Lathrop (June 13, 1862 – February 14, 1941) was an American politician and farmer.

Born in Wauzeka, Crawford County, Wisconsin. Lathrop was a farmer and was involved with the telephone company. He served as chairman of the Wauzeka town board, the school board, and on the Crawford County Board of Supervisors. In 1915, Lathrop served in the Wisconsin State Assembly and was a Democrat. Lathrop died at his home in Wauzeka, Wisconsin of a stroke.
