= Jeremiah O'Neil =

American politician

Jeremiah O'Neil (January 13, 1866 – November 19, 1947) was an American educator, newspaperman and judge from Wauzeka, Wisconsin who served one term as a member of the Wisconsin State Assembly from Crawford County.

== Background ==
O'Neil was born on a farm in the Town of Utica on January 13, 1866. He was educated in the public schools of Mt. Sterling; then attended the state normal school at Oshkosh (now the University of Wisconsin–Oshkosh), graduating from the course in elementary education in June 1893. He taught school and served as principal of the grade schools in Kewaskum from 1893 to 1896, then taught in Crawford County for five years.

On January 1, 1899, he became editor and publisher of the weekly newspaper The Kickapoo Chief in Wauzeka.

== Public office ==
O'Neil served two terms as president of the village board of Wauzeka. He ran for the Crawford County seat in the Assembly in 1904 as a Democrat, losing to Republican incumbent James Dinsdale, with 1770 votes to Dinsdale's 1998. Dinsdale was not a candidate in 1906, and O'Neil was victorious in his second attempt, with 1567 votes to 1,325 for Republican A. M. Laird. He was assigned to the standing committee on engrossed bills, and the joint committee on printing. He was defeated for reelection in 1908 by Republican George T. Atwood, who drew 1909 votes to 1706 for O'Neil and 73 for Prohibitionist R. Dobson.

In 1913 he quit as publisher of the Chief when he was elected the county judge for Crawford County. He was re-elected every six years until his death on November 19, 1947 in a hospital in Prairie du Chien, Wisconsin. His wife had died the previous spring.

== Personal life ==
He married Edna Charlotte Bellows; they had three children: John, Margaret, and William.
