= Dedrick Martin Langve =

American lawyer and politician

Dedrick Martin Langve (March 8, 1892 – April 2, 1959) was an American lawyer and politician.

Born in the town of Utica, Crawford County, Wisconsin, Langve served in the United States Army during World War I. Langve went to the Madison, Minnesota Normal School and to St. Olaf College. He then went to Valparaiso University Law School. Langve practiced law in Westby, Wisconsin from 1924 onward; he also practiced law in La Crosse, Wisconsin for one year. Langve served as clerk of Wisconsin Circuit Court for Crawford County. Langve served in the Wisconsin State Assembly in 1929 and 1931 and was a Progressive Republican. Langve died at his home in Westby, Wisconsin after one year of failing health. He was buried at Utica Lutheran Church Cemetery in Crawford County, Wisconsin.
