= Boydtown, Wisconsin =

- Unincorporated community
- Location within Wisconsin Location within the United States
- Coordinates: 43°06′38″N 90°48′13″W
- Country: United States
- State: Wisconsin
- County: Crawford
- Towns: Marietta, Wauzeka
- Elevation: 650 ft (200 m)
- Time zone: UTC-6 (Central (CST))
  - Summer (DST): UTC-5 (CDT)
- Area code: 608
- GNIS feature ID: 1577523

Boydtown is an unincorporated community in the towns of Marietta and Wauzeka, Crawford County, Wisconsin, United States. Boydtown is situated on Wisconsin Highway 60 and the north bank of the Wisconsin River, 4.5 miles (7.2 km) east-northeast of the village of Wauzeka. The community was named by and for Robert Boyd, who laid out the community in 1844 with the expectation of a railroad being built through the area.
