= Scott, Crawford County, Wisconsin =

Scott, Wisconsin
- Town
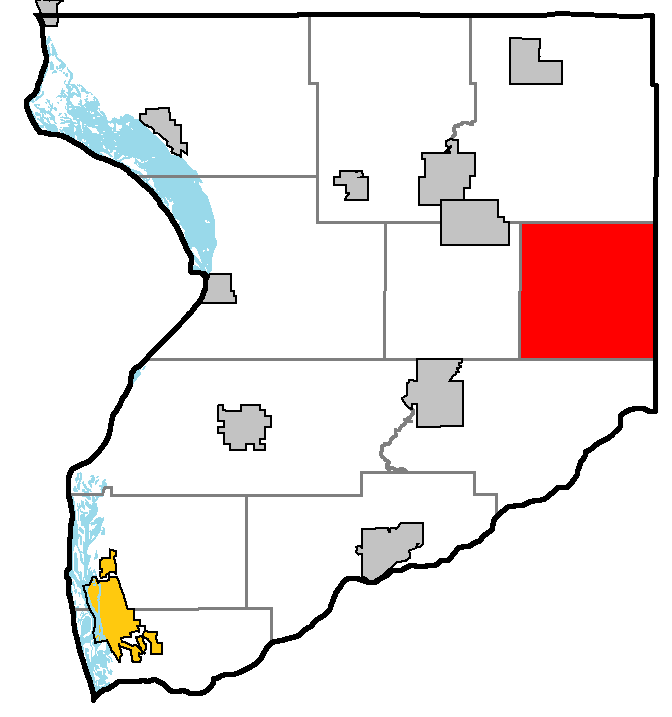
- Location of Scott, within Crawford County, Wisconsin

- Location of Crawford County, Wisconsin
- Coordinates: 43°15′13″N 90°43′10″W
- Country: United States
- State: Wisconsin
- County: Crawford

Area
  - Total: 35.7 sq mi (92.4 km^{2})
  - Land: 35.7 sq mi (92.4 km^{2})
  - Water: 0 sq mi (0.0 km^{2})
- Elevation: 1,050 ft (320 m)

Population (2020)
  - Total: 519
  - Density: 14.5/sq mi (5.62/km^{2})
- Time zone: UTC-6 (Central (CST))
  - Summer (DST): UTC-5 (CDT)
- Area code: 608
- FIPS code: 55-72275
- GNIS feature ID: 1584116

Scott is a town in Crawford County, Wisconsin, United States. The population was 519 at the 2020 census. The unincorporated communities of Harmony Hill, Mount Zion, and Plugtown are located in the town.

== Geography ==
According to the United States Census Bureau, the town has a total area of 35.7 square miles (92.5 km^{2}), all land.

== Demographics ==
As of the census of 2000, there were 503 people, 179 households, and 150 families residing in the town. The population density was 14.1 people per square mile (5.4/km^{2}). There were 224 housing units at an average density of 6.3 per square mile (2.4/km^{2}). The racial makeup of the town was 99.01% White, 0.20% African American, and 0.80% from two or more races. Hispanic or Latino of any race were 0.80% of the population.

There were 179 households, out of which 31.8% had children under the age of 18 living with them, 69.8% were married couples living together, 7.3% had a female householder with no husband present, and 16.2% were non-families. 10.6% of all households were made up of individuals, and 5.6% had someone living alone who was 65 years of age or older. The average household size was 2.81 and the average family size was 2.94.

In the town, the population was spread out, with 25.8% under the age of 18, 7.6% from 18 to 24, 22.5% from 25 to 44, 33.4% from 45 to 64, and 10.7% who were 65 years of age or older. The median age was 41 years. For every 100 females, there were 98.8 males. For every 100 females age 18 and over, there were 99.5 males.

The median income for a household in the town was $41,979, and the median income for a family was $42,159. Males had a median income of $27,143 versus $21,607 for females. The per capita income for the town was $15,804. About 8.7% of families and 8.8% of the population were below the poverty line, including 5.7% of those under age 18 and 13.5% of those age 65 or over.
