= Marietta, Wisconsin =

- Town
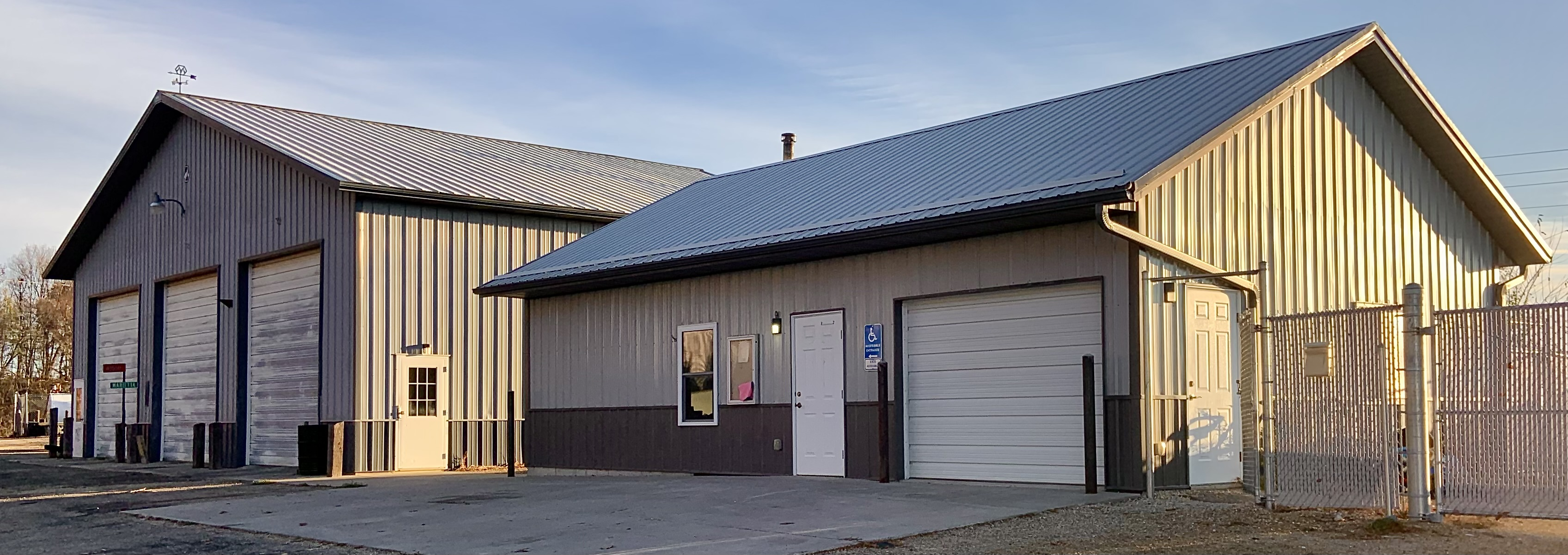
- Town hall

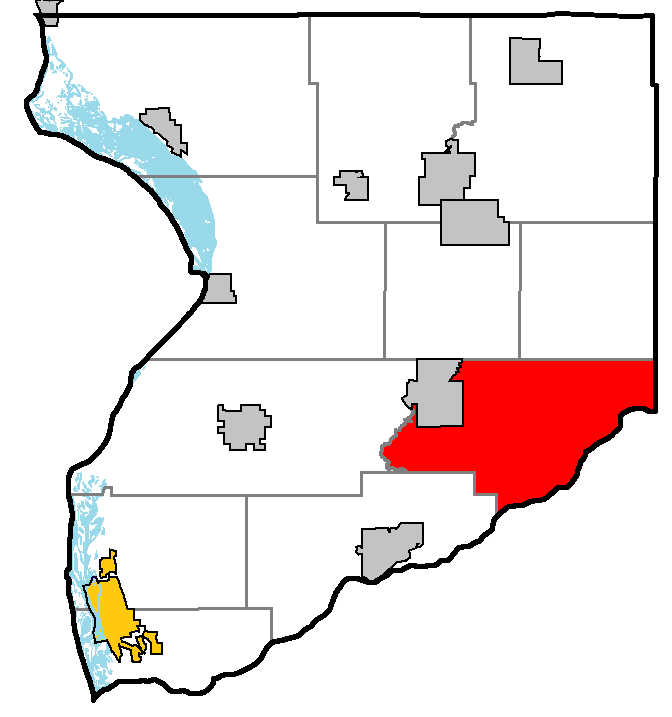
- Location of Marietta, within Crawford County, Wisconsin

- Location of Crawford County, Wisconsin
- Coordinates: 43°9′27″N 90°47′3″W
- Country: United States
- State: Wisconsin
- County: Crawford

Area
  - Total: 48.0 sq mi (124.4 km^{2})
  - Land: 47.0 sq mi (121.8 km^{2})
  - Water: 1.0 sq mi (2.7 km^{2})
- Elevation: 1,001 ft (305 m)

Population (2020)
  - Total: 507
  - Density: 10.8/sq mi (4.16/km^{2})
- Time zone: UTC-6 (Central (CST))
  - Summer (DST): UTC-5 (CDT)
- Area code: 608
- FIPS code: 55-49275
- GNIS feature ID: 1583653

Marietta is a town in Crawford County, Wisconsin, United States. The population was 507 at the 2020 census. The unincorporated community of Easter Rock is located in the town. The unincorporated community of Boydtown is located partially in the town.

== Geography ==
According to the United States Census Bureau, the town has a total area of 48.0 square miles (124.4 km^{2}), of which 47.0 square miles (121.8 km^{2}) is land and 1.0 square miles (2.7 km^{2}) (2.14%) is water.

== Demographics ==
As of the census of 2000, there were 510 people, 197 households, and 141 families residing in the town. The population density was 10.8 people per square mile (4.2/km^{2}). There were 248 housing units at an average density of 5.3 per square mile (2.0/km^{2}). The racial makeup of the town was 99.61% White, and 0.39% from two or more races.

There were 197 households, out of which 34.0% had children under the age of 18 living with them, 58.4% were married couples living together, 5.6% had a female householder with no husband present, and 28.4% were non-families. 23.9% of all households were made up of individuals, and 10.2% had someone living alone who was 65 years of age or older. The average household size was 2.56 and the average family size was 3.00.

In the town, the population was spread out, with 27.1% under the age of 18, 6.5% from 18 to 24, 24.5% from 25 to 44, 28.4% from 45 to 64, and 13.5% who were 65 years of age or older. The median age was 41 years. For every 100 females, there were 109.9 males. For every 100 females age 18 and over, there were 107.8 males.

The median income for a household in the town was $33,906, and the median income for a family was $41,563. Males had a median income of $26,406 versus $20,000 for females. The per capita income for the town was $14,341. About 9.0% of families and 10.5% of the population were below the poverty line, including 13.7% of those under age 18 and 12.3% of those age 65 or over.
