= Seneca (community), Crawford County, Wisconsin =

Seneca, Wisconsin
- Unincorporated community
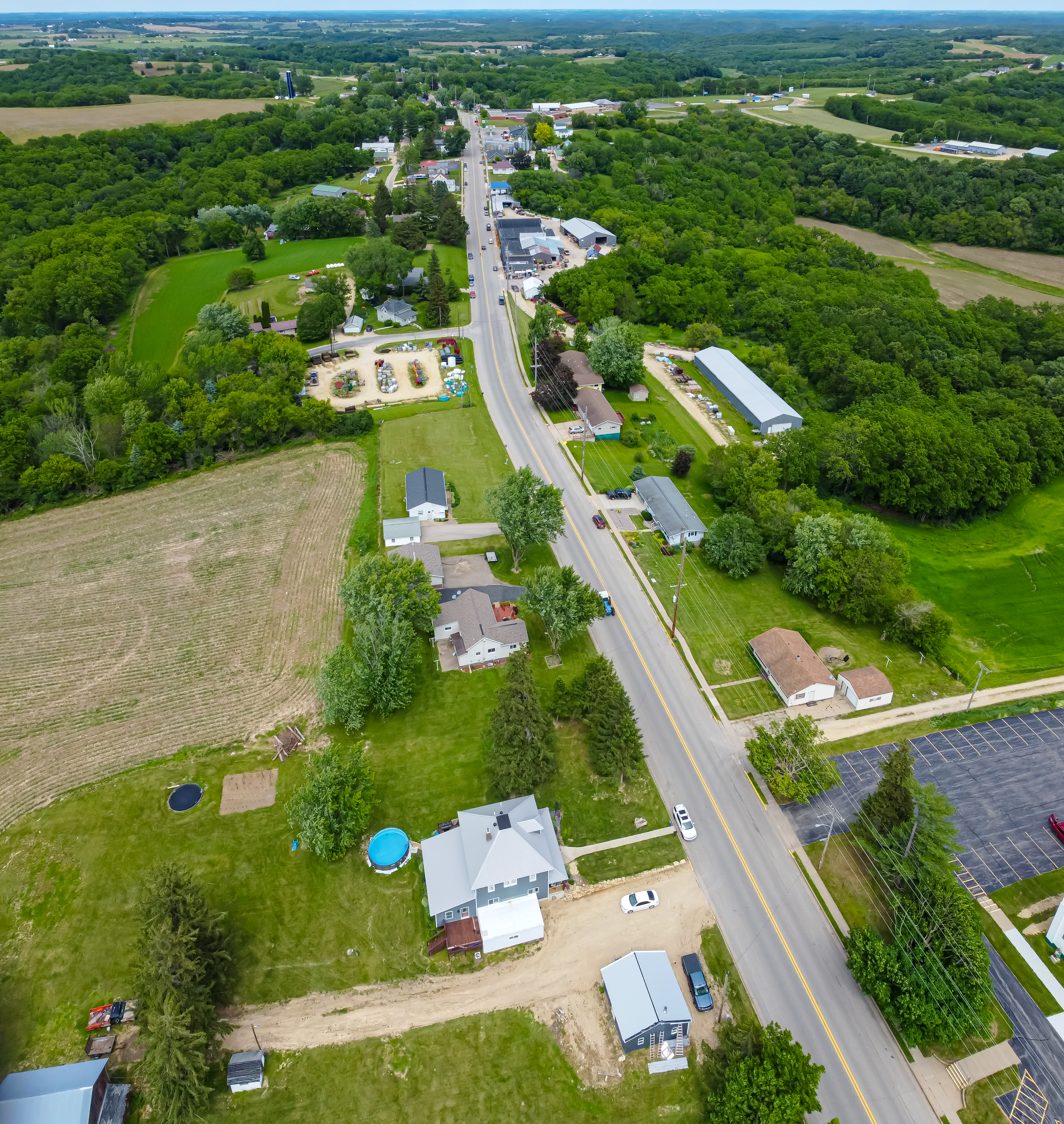
- Wis-27 runs through town

- Location within Wisconsin Location within the United States
- Coordinates: 43°15′54″N 90°57′30″W
- Country: United States
- State: Wisconsin
- County: Crawford
- Town: Seneca
- Elevation: 1,253 ft (382 m)
- Time zone: UTC-6 (Central (CST))
  - Summer (DST): UTC-5 (CDT)
- ZIP code: 54654
- Area code: 608
- GNIS feature ID: 1573899

Seneca is an unincorporated community in the town of Seneca, Crawford County, Wisconsin, United States. Seneca is on Wisconsin Highway 27, 4 miles (6.4 km) south-southwest of Mount Sterling. Seneca has a post office with ZIP code 54654. Seneca Area School District and Seneca High School is located in the community.

== Gallery ==
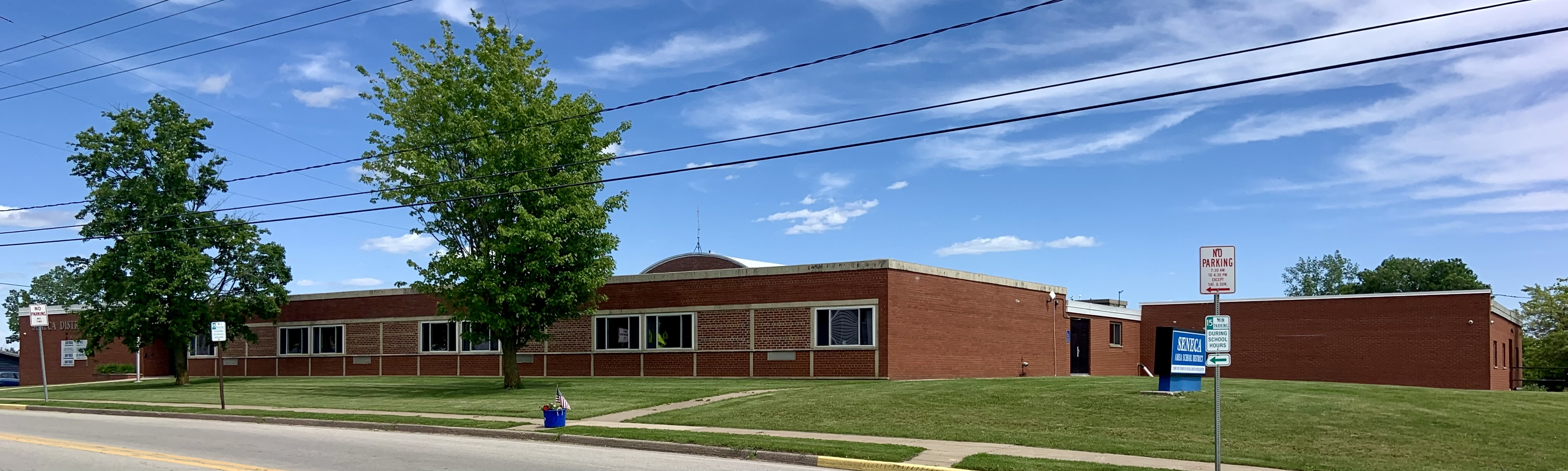
Seneca schools

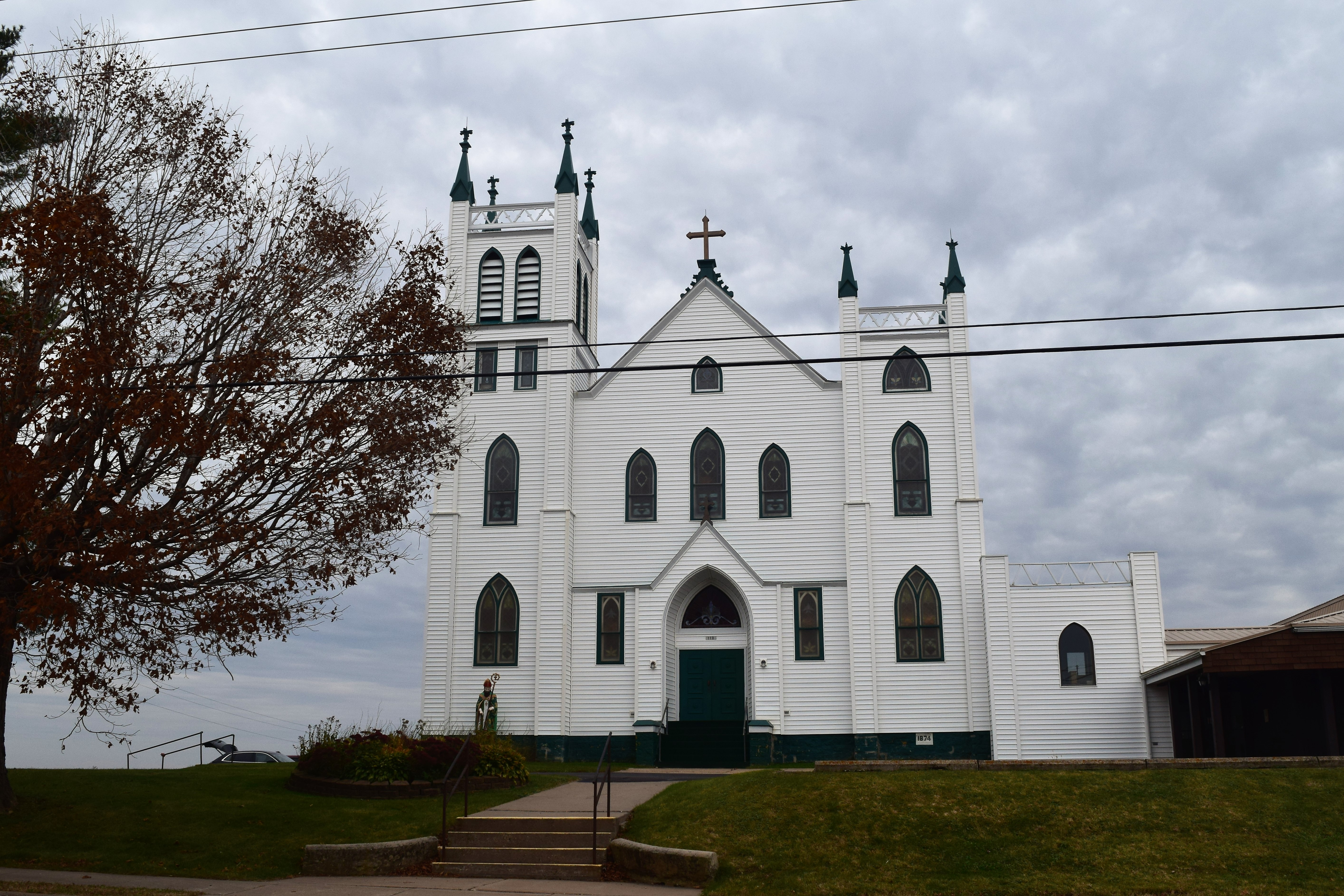
St. Patrick's Catholic Church
