= Yankeetown, Wisconsin =

- Unincorporated community
- Location within Wisconsin Location within the United States
- Coordinates: 43°22′48″N 90°47′52″W
- Country: United States
- State: Wisconsin
- County: Crawford
- Town: Clayton
- Elevation: 778 ft (237 m)
- Time zone: UTC-6 (Central (CST))
  - Summer (DST): UTC-5 (CDT)
- Area code: 608
- GNIS feature ID: 2760638

Yankeetown is an unincorporated community in the town of Clayton, Crawford County, Wisconsin, United States, approximately two miles southwest of Soldiers Grove on Wisconsin Highway 131.

== History ==
The cemetery there (still extant) was established around 1861; it is the oldest in the town of Clayton. In 1870 there was a schoolhouse there, which was used for services by a newly organized congregation of the Disciples of Christ.

William Henry Evans, a farmer, lawyer, and member of the Wisconsin State Assembly, lived in Yankeetown.

The Yankeetown post office ceased to be listed in the Wisconsin Blue Book as of the 1883 edition.
