= Eastman (town), Wisconsin =

Eastman, Wisconsin
- Town
- Town of Eastman
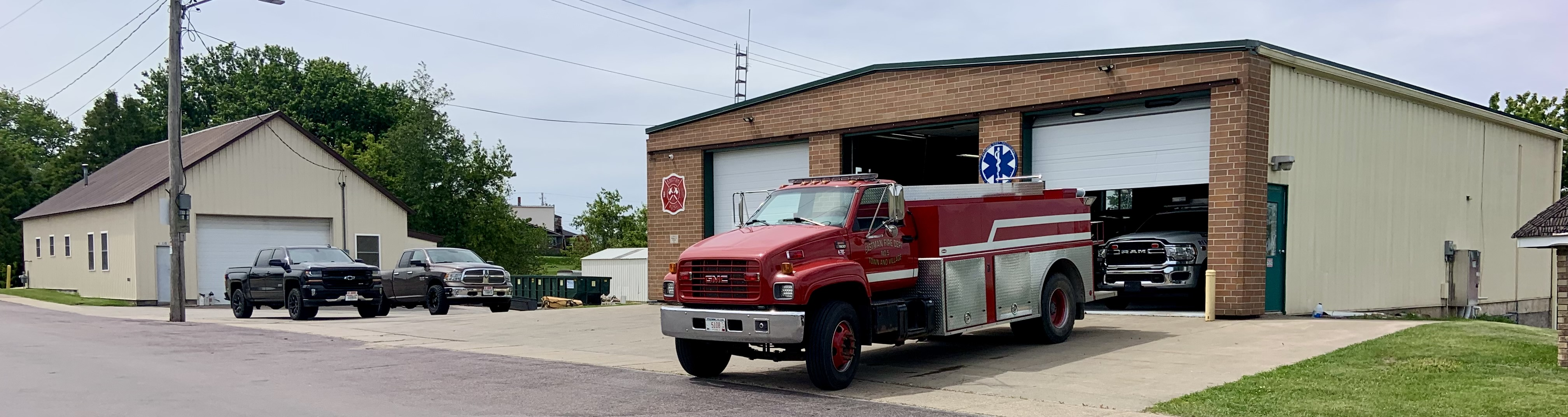
- Eastman Town Hall and fire department

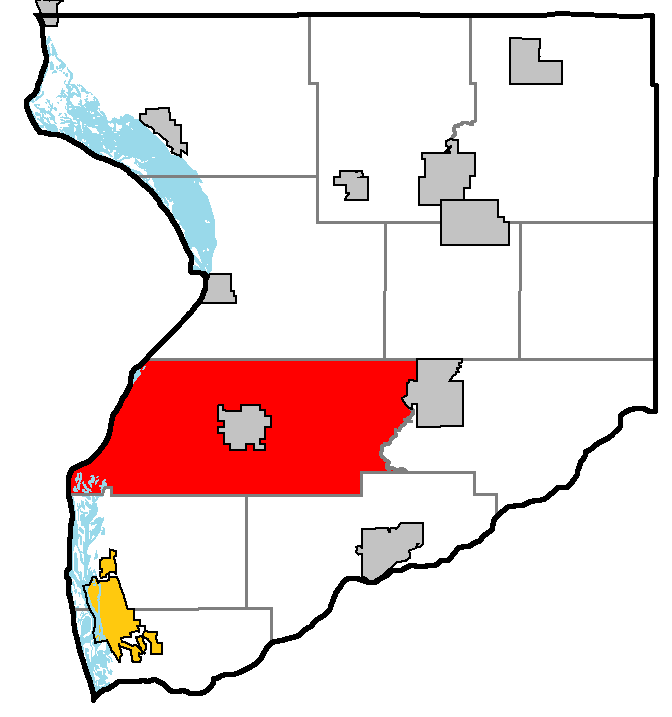
- Location of Eastman, within Crawford County, Wisconsin

- Location of Crawford County, Wisconsin
- Coordinates: 43°11′07″N 90°57′42″W
- Country: United States
- State: Wisconsin
- County: Crawford

Area
  - Total: 72.68 sq mi (188.2 km^{2})
  - Land: 71.35 sq mi (184.8 km^{2})
  - Water: 1.33 sq mi (3.4 km^{2})

Population (2020)
  - Total: 731
  - Density: 10.2/sq mi (3.96/km^{2})
- Time zone: UTC-6 (Central (CST))
  - Summer (DST): UTC-5 (CDT)
- Area code(s): 608 and 353
- GNIS feature ID: 1583116
- Website: https://townofeastman.com/

Eastman is a town in Crawford County, Wisconsin, United States. The population was 731 at the 2020 census. The village of Eastman and the unincorporated community of Charme are located within the town.

== Geography ==
According to the United States Census Bureau, the town has a total area of 72.6 square miles (188.0 km^{2}), of which 71.5 square miles (185.1 km^{2}) is land and 1.1 square miles (3.0 km^{2}) (1.57%) is water.

== Demographics ==
As of the census of 2000, there were 790 people, 287 households, and 225 families residing in the town. The population density was 11.1 people per square mile (4.3/km^{2}). There were 475 housing units at an average density of 6.6 per square mile (2.6/km^{2}). The racial makeup of the town was 99.37% White, 0.13% Black or African American, 0.13% Native American, and 0.38% from two or more races. 0.25% of the population were Hispanic or Latino of any race.

There were 287 households, out of which 35.2% had children under the age of 18 living with them, 69.0% were married couples living together, 5.2% had a female householder with no husband present, and 21.3% were non-families. 18.1% of all households were made up of individuals, and 8.4% had someone living alone who was 65 years of age or older. The average household size was 2.75 and the average family size was 3.11.

In the town, the population was spread out, with 28.5% under the age of 18, 7.2% from 18 to 24, 26.3% from 25 to 44, 26.2% from 45 to 64, and 11.8% who were 65 years of age or older. The median age was 38 years. For every 100 females, there were 105.7 males. For every 100 females age 18 and over, there were 111.6 males.

The median income for a household in the town was $38,750, and the median income for a family was $46,094. Males had a median income of $31,667 versus $21,080 for females. The per capita income for the town was $16,317. About 4.8% of families and 10.0% of the population were below the poverty line, including 9.8% of those under age 18 and 17.0% of those age 65 or over.

== Notable people ==
- Zenas Beach, farmer, soldier, and Wisconsin state legislator, lived in the town
