= Freeman, Wisconsin =

- Town
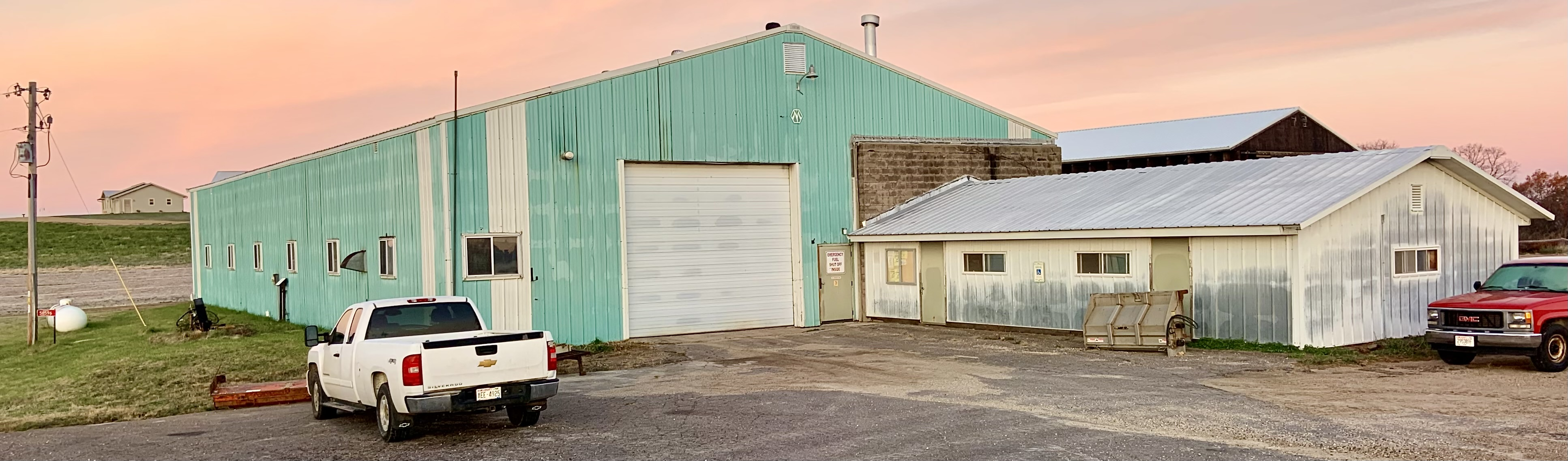
- Town hall

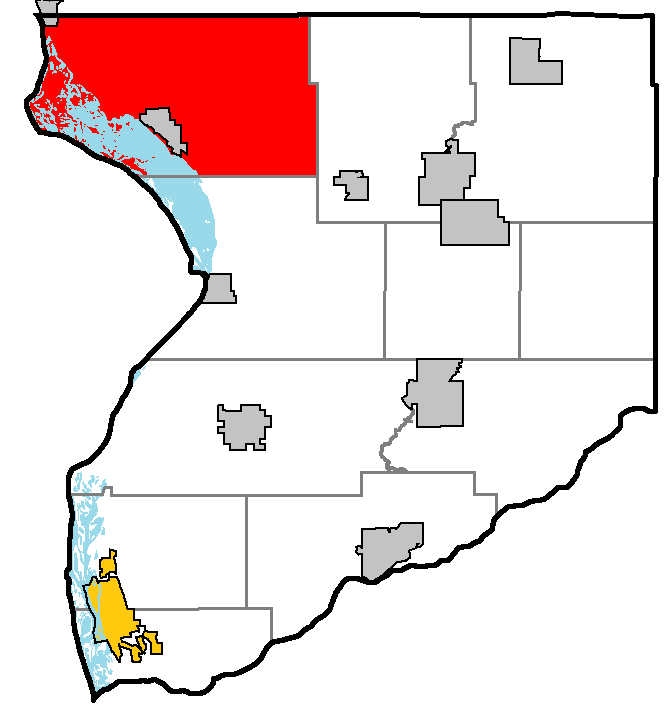
- Location of Freeman, within Crawford County, Wisconsin

- Location of Crawford County, Wisconsin
- Coordinates: 43°21′41″N 91°3′59″W
- Country: United States
- State: Wisconsin
- County: Crawford

Area
  - Total: 77.7 sq mi (201.2 km^{2})
  - Land: 68.2 sq mi (176.6 km^{2})
  - Water: 9.5 sq mi (24.6 km^{2})
- Elevation: 883 ft (269 m)

Population (2020)
  - Total: 727
  - Density: 10.7/sq mi (4.12/km^{2})
- Time zone: UTC-6 (Central (CST))
  - Summer (DST): UTC-5 (CDT)
- Area code: 608
- FIPS code: 55-27700
- GNIS feature ID: 1583244
- Website: townoffreeman.com

Freeman is a town in Crawford County, Wisconsin, United States. The population was 727 at the 2020 census. The villages of Ferryville and De Soto are located in the town. The unincorporated community of Reed is also located in the town.

== Geography ==
According to the United States Census Bureau, the town has a total area of 77.7 square miles (201.2 km^{2}), of which 68.2 square miles (176.6 km^{2}) is land and 9.5 square miles (24.6 km^{2}) (12.23%) is water.

== Demographics ==
As of the census of 2000, there were 719 people, 301 households, and 207 families residing in the town. The population density was 10.5 people per square mile (4.1/km^{2}). There were 493 housing units at an average density of 7.2 per square mile (2.8/km^{2}). The racial makeup of the town was 97.50% White, 0.28% African American, 0.70% Native American, 0.28% Asian, and 1.25% from two or more races. Hispanic or Latino of any race were 0.56% of the population.

There were 301 households, out of which 22.9% had children under the age of 18 living with them, 59.1% were married couples living together, 5.3% had a female householder with no husband present, and 30.9% were non-families. 24.6% of all households were made up of individuals, and 12.3% had someone living alone who was 65 years of age or older. The average household size was 2.39 and the average family size was 2.84.

In the town, the population was spread out, with 22.7% under the age of 18, 5.3% from 18 to 24, 23.4% from 25 to 44, 30.7% from 45 to 64, and 17.9% who were 65 years of age or older. The median age was 44 years. For every 100 females, there were 103.7 males. For every 100 females age 18 and over, there were 101.4 males.

The median income for a household in the town was $30,500, and the median income for a family was $39,375. Males had a median income of $27,625 versus $20,625 for females. The per capita income for the town was $16,609. About 8.3% of families and 16.3% of the population were below the poverty line, including 28.9% of those under age 18 and 15.1% of those age 65 or over.
