= Seneca, Crawford County, Wisconsin =

Seneca, Wisconsin
- Town
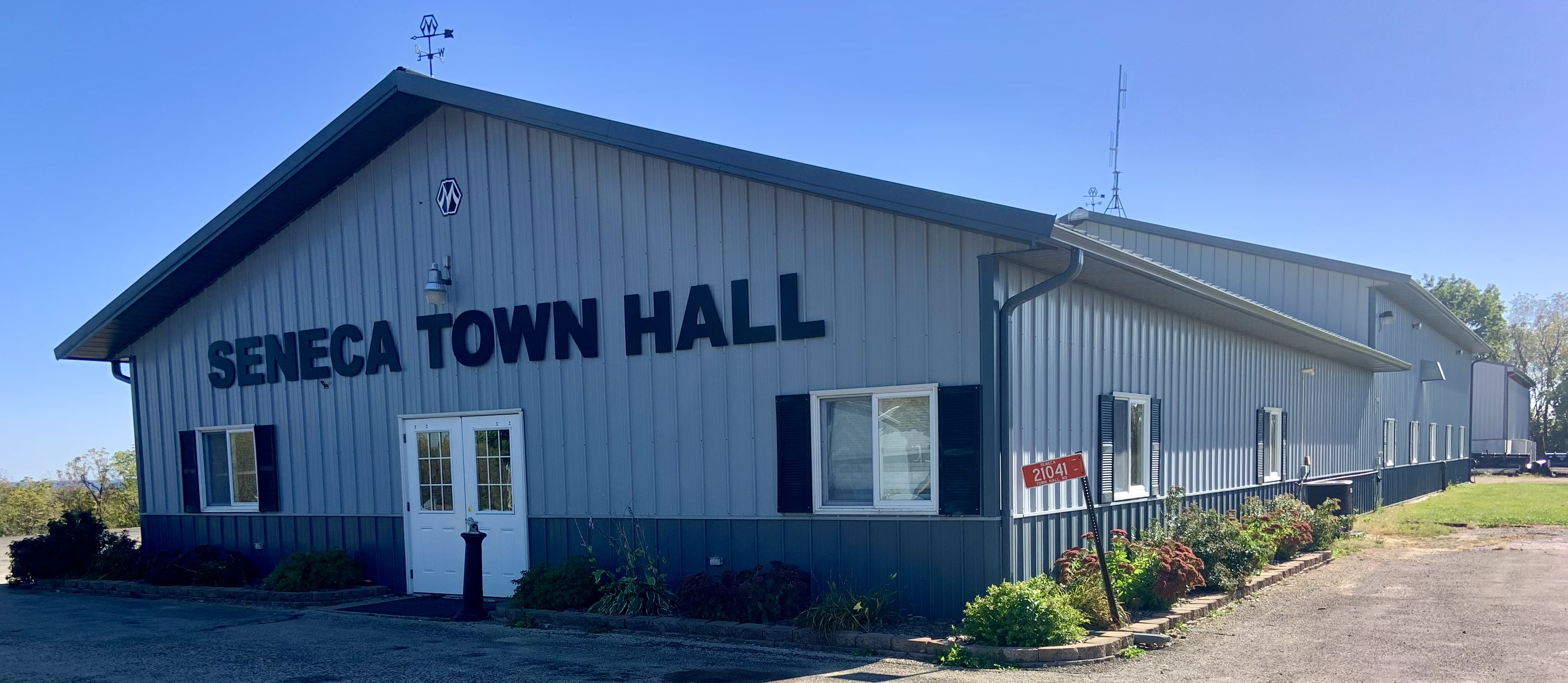
- Town hall

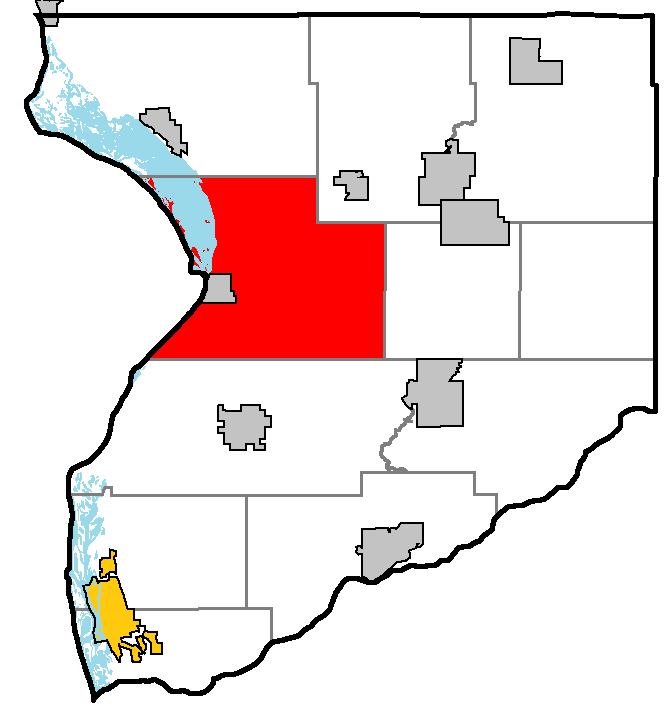
- Location of Seneca, within Crawford County, Wisconsin

- Location of Crawford County, Wisconsin
- Coordinates: 43°15′24″N 91°0′6″W
- Country: United States
- State: Wisconsin
- County: Crawford

Area
  - Total: 65.5 sq mi (169.7 km^{2})
  - Land: 58.6 sq mi (151.8 km^{2})
  - Water: 6.9 sq mi (17.9 km^{2})
- Elevation: 1,120 ft (340 m)

Population (2020)
  - Total: 932
  - Density: 15.9/sq mi (6.14/km^{2})
- Time zone: UTC-6 (Central (CST))
  - Summer (DST): UTC-5 (CDT)
- Area code: 608
- FIPS code: 55-72500
- GNIS feature ID: 1584121
- Website: https://thetownofseneca.com/

Seneca is a village in Crawford County, Wisconsin, United States. The population was 932 at the 2020 census. The unincorporated community of Seneca is located in the town.

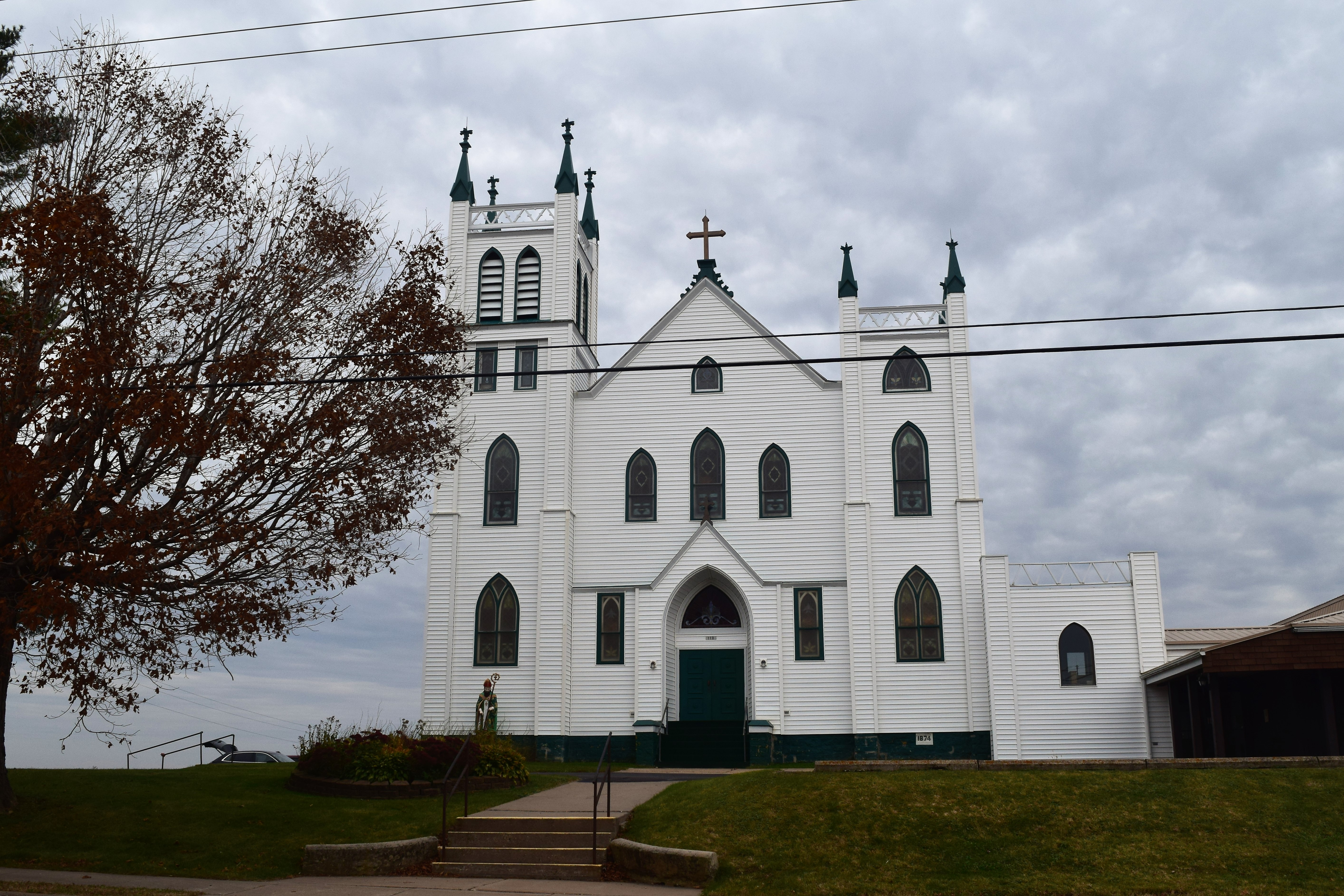
St. Patrick's Catholic Church in the community of Seneca

== Geography ==
According to the United States Census Bureau, the town has a total area of 65.5 square miles (169.7 km^{2}), of which 58.6 square miles (151.8 km^{2}) is land and 6.9 square miles (17.9 km^{2}) (10.53%) is water.

== Demographics ==
As of the census of 2000, there were 893 people, 311 households, and 251 families residing in the town. The population density was 15.2 people per square mile (5.9/km^{2}). There were 479 housing units at an average density of 8.2 per square mile (3.2/km^{2}). The racial makeup of the town was 98.88% White, 0.11% Asian, 0.11% Pacific Islander, 0.22% from other races, and 0.67% from two or more races. Hispanic or Latino of any race were 1.01% of the population.

There were 311 households, out of which 37.9% had children under the age of 18 living with them, 71.1% were married couples living together, 5.8% had a female householder with no husband present, and 19.0% were non-families. 15.8% of all households were made up of individuals, and 7.7% had someone living alone who was 65 years of age or older. The average household size was 2.87 and the average family size was 3.21.

In the town, the population was spread out, with 30.7% under the age of 18, 6.0% from 18 to 24, 24.0% from 25 to 44, 26.1% from 45 to 64, and 13.2% who were 65 years of age or older. The median age was 38 years. For every 100 females, there were 109.6 males. For every 100 females age 18 and over, there were 108.4 males.

The median income for a household in the town was $35,227, and the median income for a family was $42,321. Males had a median income of $28,333 versus $16,125 for females. The per capita income for the town was $16,434. About 4.0% of families and 6.7% of the population were below the poverty line, including 4.6% of those under age 18 and 4.7% of those age 65 or over.
