= Wauzeka (town), Wisconsin =

Wauzeka, Wisconsin
- Town
- Town of Wauzeka
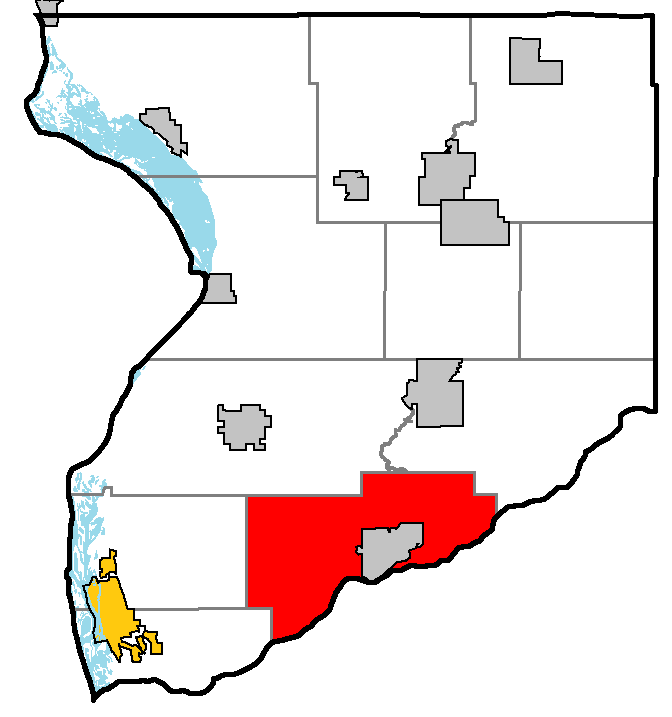
- Location of Wauzeka, within Crawford County, Wisconsin

- Location of Crawford County, Wisconsin
- Coordinates: 43°05′52″N 90°56′06″W
- Country: United States
- State: Wisconsin
- County: Crawford

Area
  - Total: 43.68 sq mi (113.1 km^{2})
  - Land: 42.19 sq mi (109.3 km^{2})
  - Water: 1.49 sq mi (3.9 km^{2})

Population (2020)
  - Total: 376
  - Density: 8.91/sq mi (3.44/km^{2})
- Time zone: UTC-6 (Central (CST))
  - Summer (DST): UTC-5 (CDT)
- Area code(s): 608 and 353
- GNIS feature ID: 1584387

Wauzeka is a town in Crawford County, Wisconsin, United States. The population was 376 at the 2020 census. The village of Wauzeka is located within the town. The unincorporated community of Boydtown is located partially in the town.

== Geography ==
According to the United States Census Bureau, the town has a total area of 43.6 square miles (112.9 km^{2}), of which 42.2 square miles (109.4 km^{2}) is land and 1.4 square miles (3.5 km^{2}) (3.12%) is water.

== Demographics ==
As of the census of 2000, there were 369 people, 140 households, and 110 families residing in the town. The population density was 8.7 people per square mile (3.4/km^{2}). There were 174 housing units at an average density of 4.1 per square mile (1.6/km^{2}). The racial makeup of the town was 100.00% White. 0.00% of the population were Hispanic or Latino of any race.

There were 140 households, out of which 31.4% had children under the age of 18 living with them, 65.0% were married couples living together, 6.4% had a female householder with no husband present, and 21.4% were non-families. 18.6% of all households were made up of individuals, and 5.0% had someone living alone who was 65 years of age or older. The average household size was 2.64 and the average family size was 2.96.

In the town, the population was spread out, with 27.6% under the age of 18, 6.8% from 18 to 24, 26.3% from 25 to 44, 27.4% from 45 to 64, and 11.9% who were 65 years of age or older. The median age was 39 years. For every 100 females, there were 121.0 males. For every 100 females age 18 and over, there were 110.2 males.

The median income for a household in the town was $33,750, and the median income for a family was $35,000. Males had a median income of $28,500 versus $16,771 for females. The per capita income for the town was $18,360. About 3.8% of families and 6.7% of the population were below the poverty line, including 2.3% of those under age 18 and 5.4% of those age 65 or over.
