= Zenas Beach =

American farmer, soldier, and politician

Zenas Beach (May 11, 1825 – July 28, 1898) was an American farmer, soldier, and politician.

Born in Wayne County, Illinois, he moved to Prairie du Chien, Wisconsin Territory in 1846 and then to the town of Eastman, Wisconsin, in 1853 where he was a farmer. In 1846, Beach served in the United States Army during the Mexican–American War. Then during the American Civil War, Beach served in the 8th Wisconsin Volunteer Infantry Regiment as a first lieutenant. In 1875, Beach served in the Wisconsin State Assembly as a Republican. He died in Eastman, Wisconsin.
