= Mount Zion, Wisconsin =

- Unincorporated community
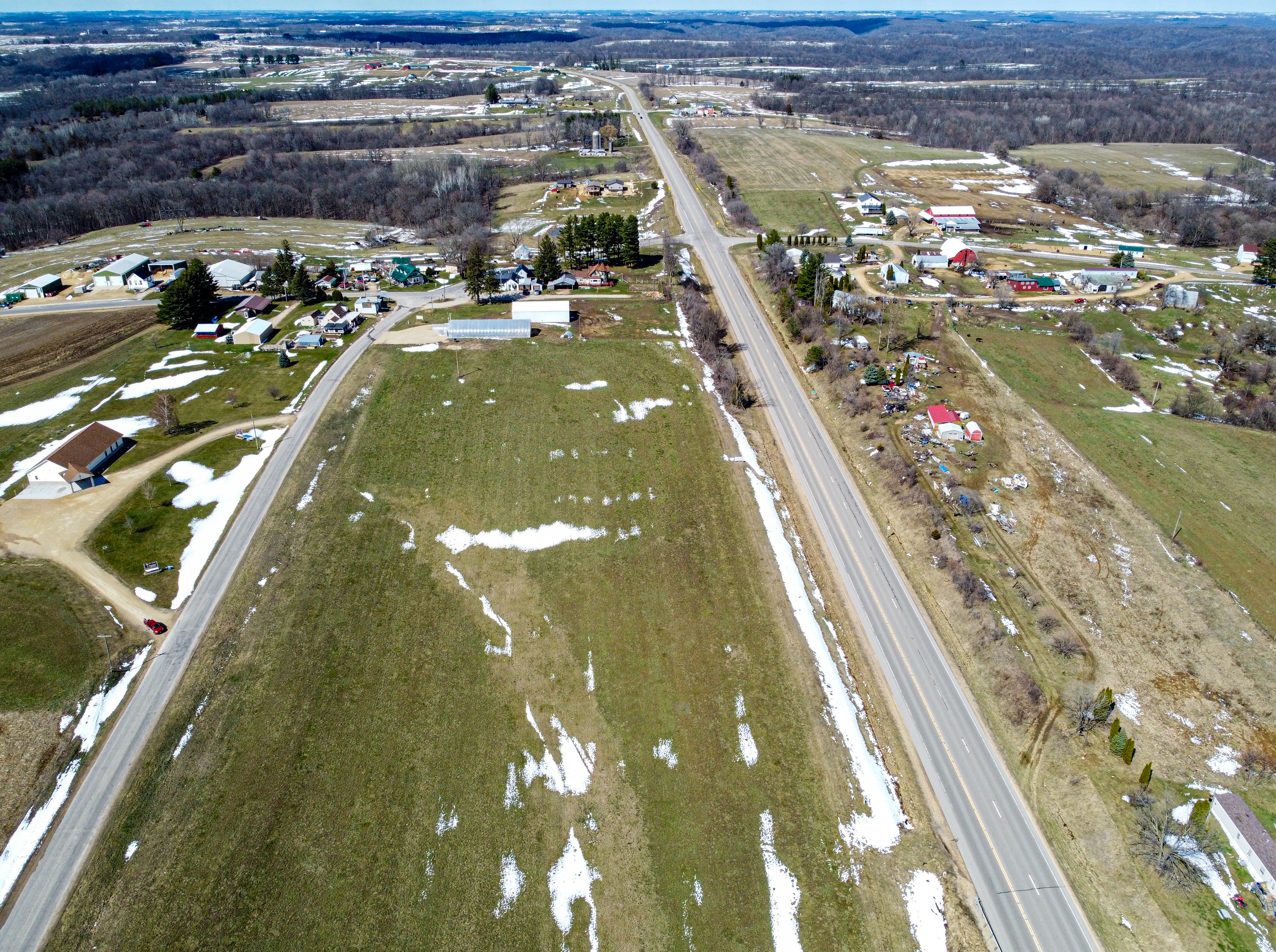
- US-61 goes through town

- Location within Wisconsin Location within the United States
- Coordinates: 43°15′24″N 90°44′01″W
- Country: United States
- State: Wisconsin
- County: Crawford
- Town: Scott
- Elevation: 1,181 ft (360 m)
- Time zone: UTC-6 (Central (CST))
  - Summer (DST): UTC-5 (CDT)
- Area code: 608
- GNIS feature ID: 1569861

Mount Zion is an unincorporated community in the town of Scott, Crawford County, Wisconsin, United States. Mount Zion is located on U.S. Route 61, 5.5 miles (8.9 km) east-southeast of Bell Center.

== Mount Zion in popular culture ==
Mount Zion was notable when Alvin Straight rode from his home in Laurens, Iowa on a John Deere riding lawn mower to visit his ailing older brother. It was a 240 miles (390 km) trip and took Straight six weeks to travel to Mount Zion.
