= Crawford County Courthouse (Wisconsin) =

- U.S. National Register of Historic Places
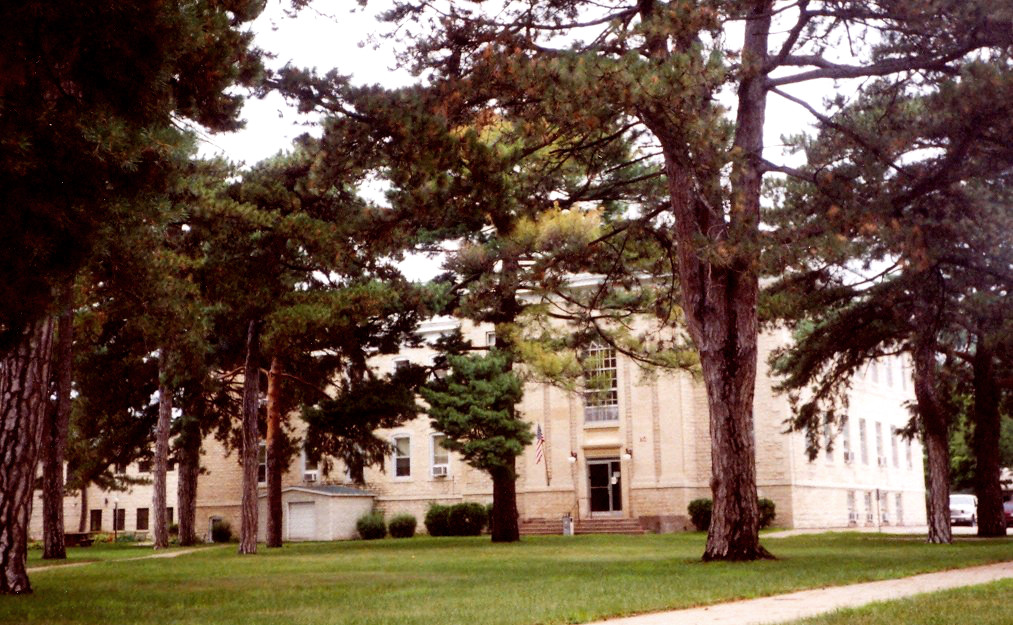
- Crawford County Courthouse

- Location within Wisconsin
- Interactive map showing the location for Crawford County Courthouse
- Location: 220 N. Beaumont Rd., Prairie du Chien, Wisconsin
- Coordinates: 43°03′17″N 91°08′44″W
- Area: 1 acre (0.40 ha)
- Built: 1867-1868, 1896, 1931
- Built by: Michael Menges
- Architectural style: Colonial Revival, Italianate, Georgian Revival
- MPS: County Courthouses of Wisconsin TR
- NRHP reference No.: 82000645
- Added to NRHP: March 9, 1982

The Crawford County Courthouse is located in Prairie du Chien, Wisconsin.

== History ==
The courthouse was built with dolomitic limestone quarried in Bridgeport, Wisconsin. The basement was originally a jail that likely predated the rest of the building. It was used as such until 1896, when a separate building was completed. The courthouse was listed on the National Register of Historic Places in 1982, and on the State Register of Historic Places in 1989.
