= Utica, Crawford County, Wisconsin =

Utica, Wisconsin
- Town
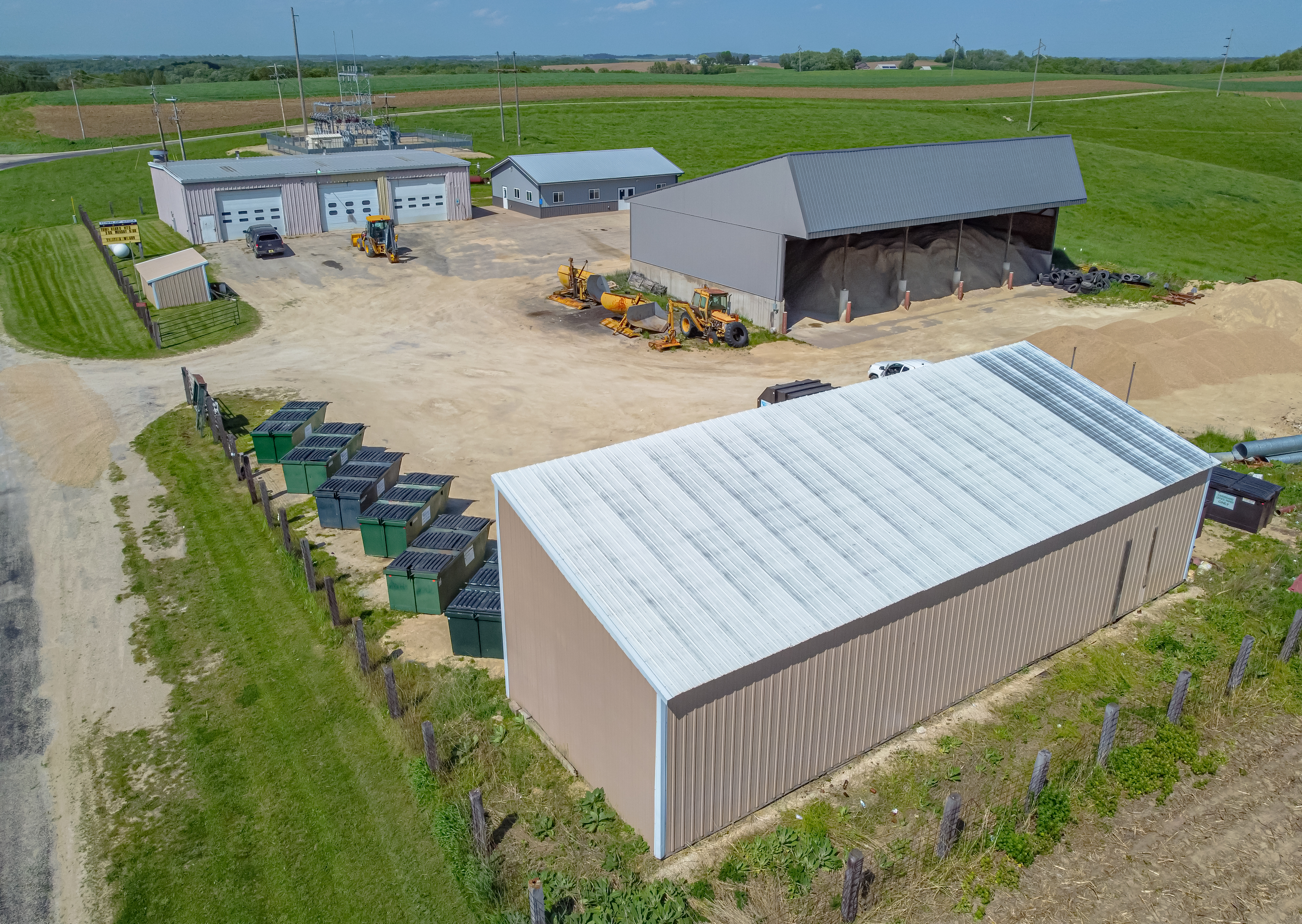
- Utica Town Hall

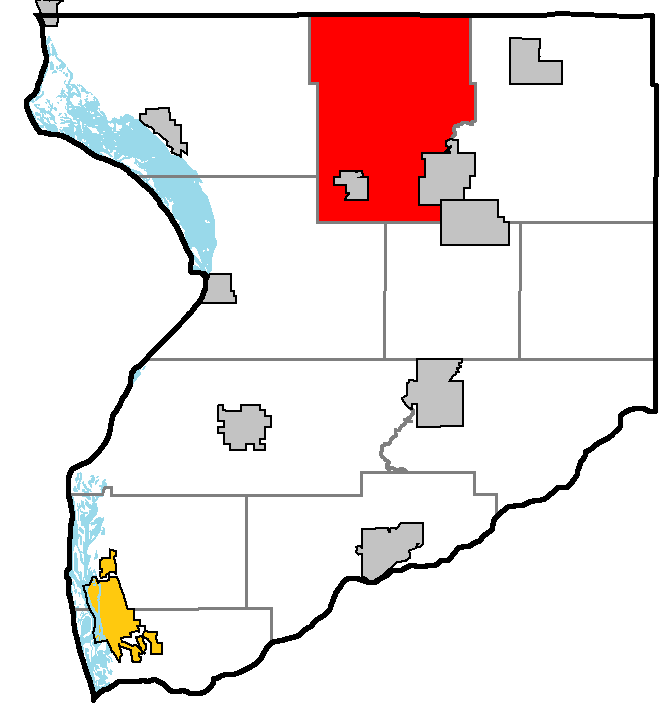
- Location of Utica, within Crawford County, Wisconsin

- Location of Crawford County, Wisconsin
- Coordinates: 43°22′10″N 90°54′40″W
- Country: United States
- State: Wisconsin
- County: Crawford

Area
  - Total: 54.1 sq mi (140.1 km^{2})
  - Land: 54.1 sq mi (140.1 km^{2})
  - Water: 0 sq mi (0.0 km^{2})
- Elevation: 899 ft (274 m)

Population (2020)
  - Total: 623
  - Density: 11.5/sq mi (4.45/km^{2})
- Time zone: UTC-6 (Central (CST))
  - Summer (DST): UTC-5 (CDT)
- Area code: 608
- FIPS code: 55-82100
- GNIS feature ID: 1584322

Utica is a town in Crawford County, Wisconsin, United States. The population was 623 at the 2020 census. The unincorporated communities of Fairview, Pine Knob, Rising Sun, and Towerville are located within the town.

== Geography ==
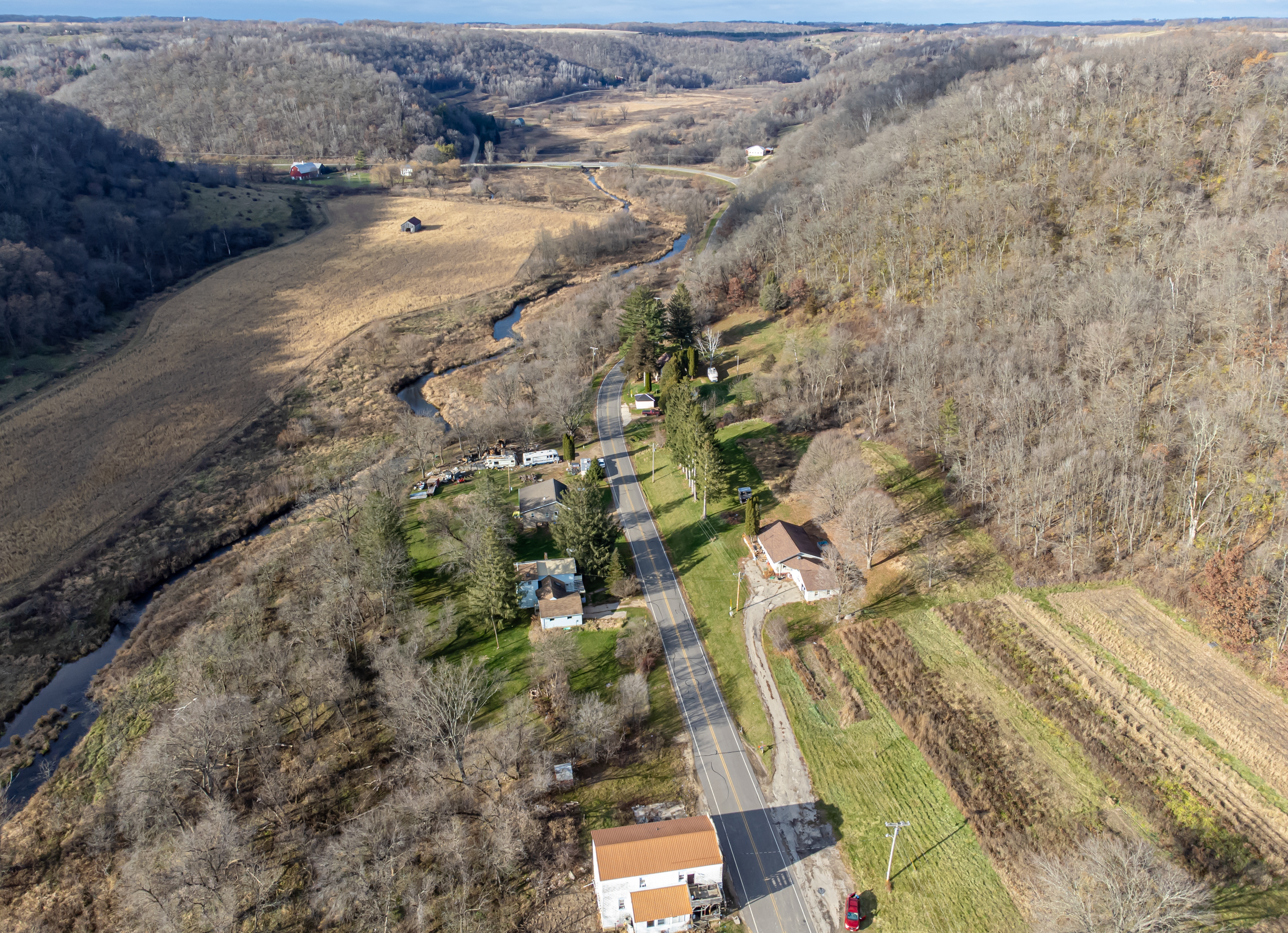
Towerville

According to the United States Census Bureau, the town has a total area of 54.1 square miles (140.1 km^{2}), all land.

== Demographics ==
As of the census of 2000, there were 674 people, 257 households, and 193 families residing in the town. The population density was 12.5 people per square mile (4.8/km^{2}). There were 317 housing units at an average density of 5.9 per square mile (2.3/km^{2}). The racial makeup of the town was 99.70% White, 0.15% from other races, and 0.15% from two or more races. Hispanic or Latino people of any race were 0.15% of the population.

There were 257 households, out of which 31.1% had children under the age of 18 living with them, 65.0% were married couples living together, 5.1% had a female householder with no husband present, and 24.9% were non-families. 18.7% of all households were made up of individuals, and 6.2% had someone living alone who was 65 years of age or older. The average household size was 2.62 and the average family size was 2.99.

In the town, the population was spread out, with 24.5% under the age of 18, 8.2% from 18 to 24, 22.6% from 25 to 44, 31.2% from 45 to 64, and 13.6% who were 65 years of age or older. The median age was 42 years. For every 100 females, there were 110.0 males. For every 100 females age 18 and over, there were 112.1 males.

The median income for a household in the town was $30,000, and the median income for a family was $33,015. Males had a median income of $18,750 versus $16,161 for females. The per capita income for the town was $12,177. About 10.9% of families and 19.2% of the population were below the poverty line, including 28.7% of those under age 18 and 10.7% of those age 65 or over.

== Notable people ==
- Dedrick Martin Langve, Wisconsin legislator and lawyer; born in the town
- Jeremiah O'Neil, Wisconsin legislator and judge; born in the town
- Thorleif T. Peterson, Wisconsin legislator and farmer; born in the town
