= Rising Sun, Wisconsin =

- Unincorporated community
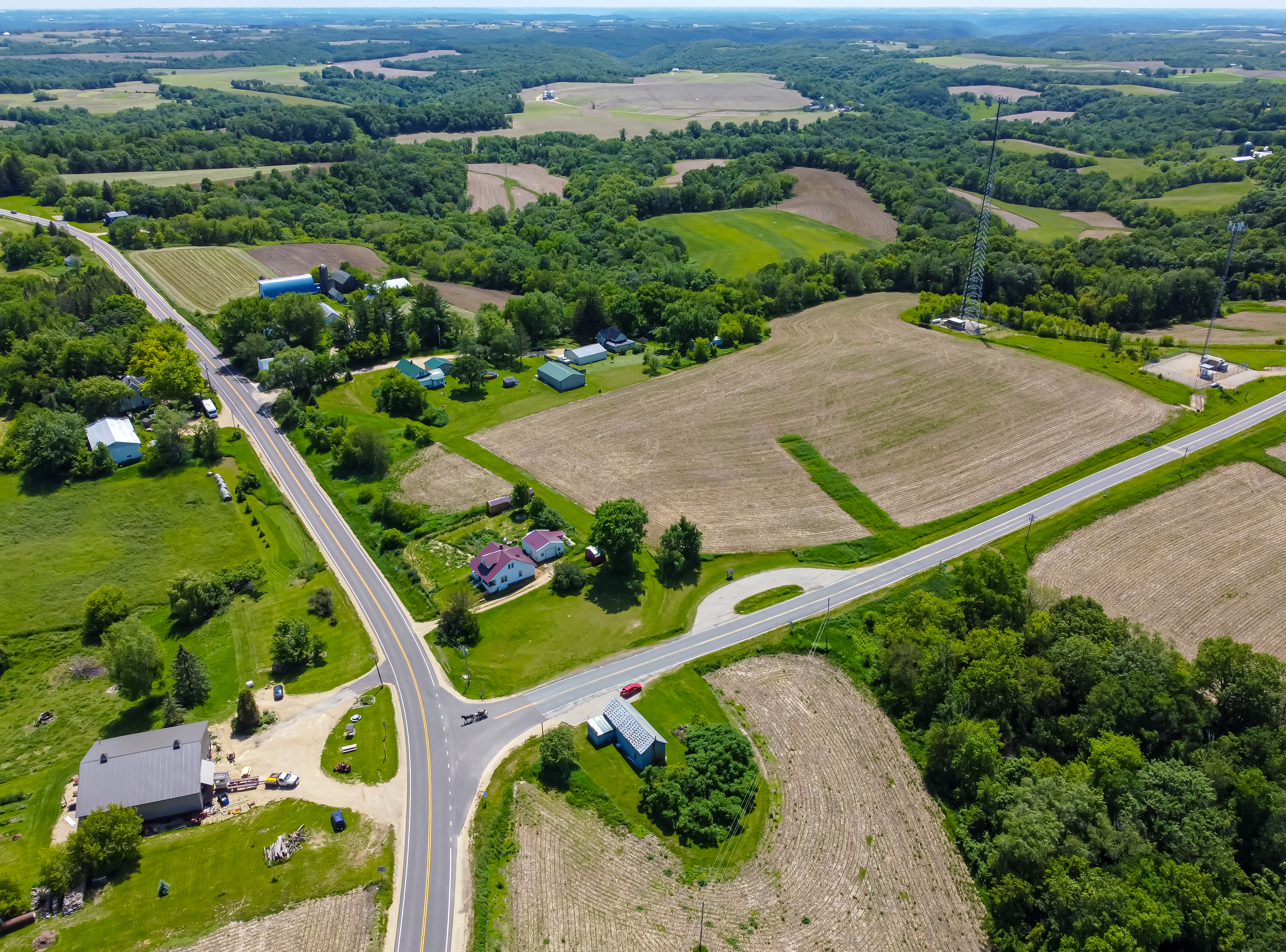
- Wis-27 runs through town

- Location within Wisconsin Location within the United States
- Coordinates: 43°25′05″N 90°57′29″W
- Country: United States
- State: Wisconsin
- County: Crawford
- Town: Utica
- Elevation: 1,299 ft (396 m)
- Time zone: UTC-6 (Central (CST))
  - Summer (DST): UTC-5 (CDT)
- Zip: 53823
- Area code: 608
- GNIS feature ID: 1572342

Rising Sun is an unincorporated community in the town of Utica, in Crawford County, Wisconsin, United States.

== History ==
"The village was named from the following incident: When Mr. Wilder first located there it had been raining for two weeks, and the sun had not made its appearance during all that time, but the next day, the sun made its appearance and from this the locality was named "Rising Sun."

A post office was established in Rising Sun on March 14, 1856 with Truman H. Wilder as postmaster. It was located in the NW quarter of the SW quarter of Section 22, Township 11N, Range 5W. It was discontinued April 20, 1904, and patrons subsequently received mail from the post office at Ferryville.
