= Clayton, Crawford County, Wisconsin =

Clayton, Wisconsin
- Town
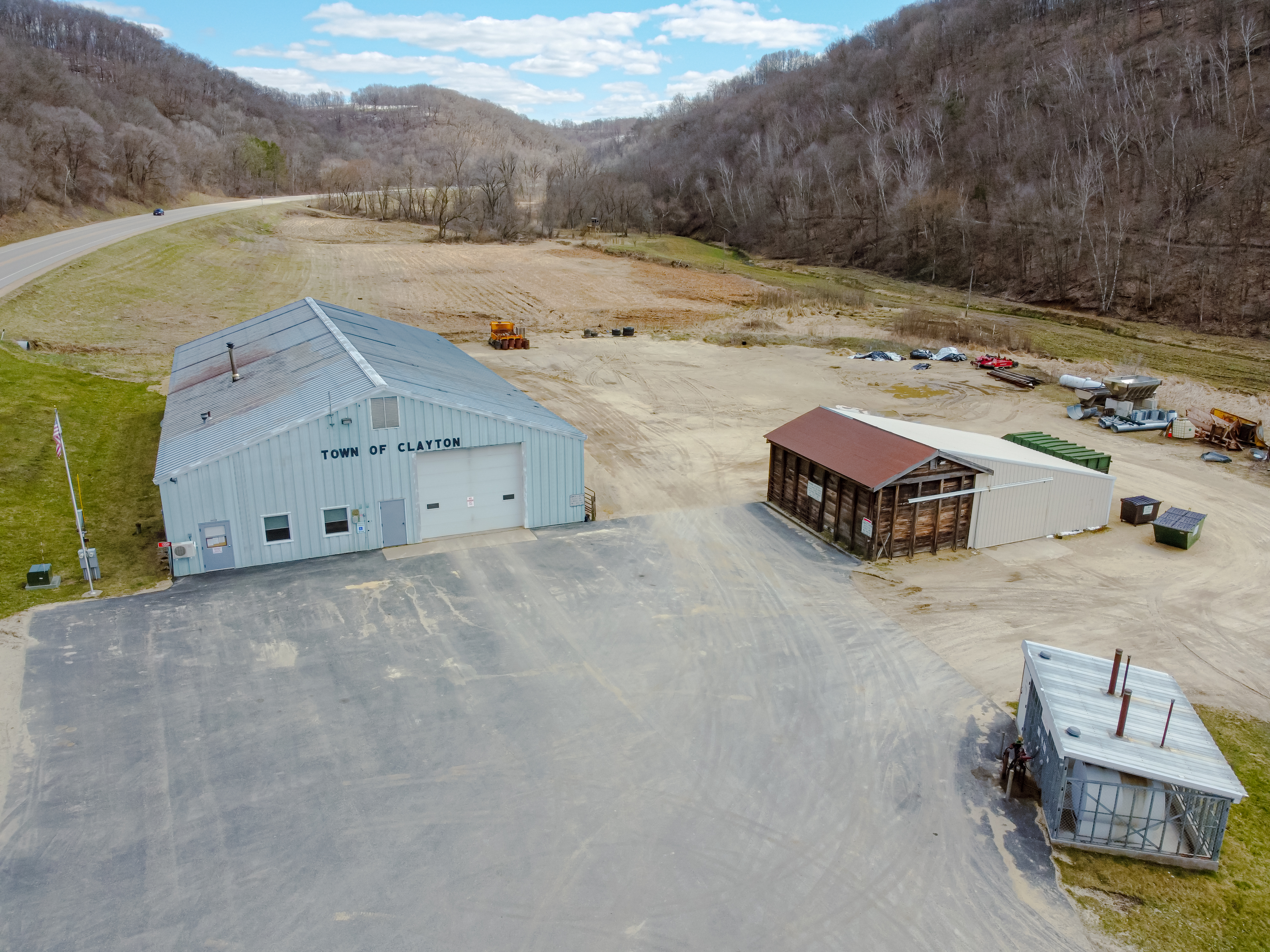
- Clayton town hall. US-61 runs by.

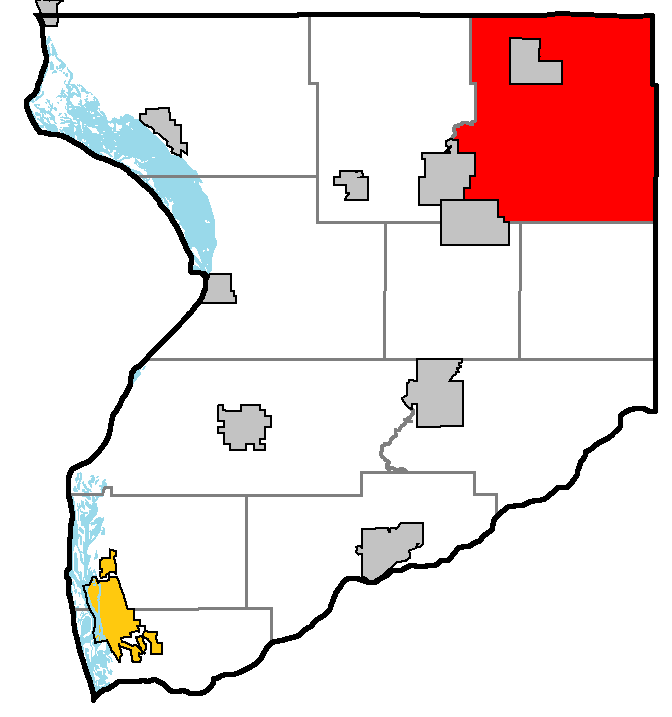
- Location of Clayton, within Crawford County, Wisconsin

- Location of Crawford County, Wisconsin
- Coordinates: 43°22′10″N 90°44′44″W
- Country: United States
- State: Wisconsin
- County: Crawford

Area
  - Total: 69.2 sq mi (179.3 km^{2})
  - Land: 69.2 sq mi (179.3 km^{2})
  - Water: 0 sq mi (0.0 km^{2})
- Elevation: 1,120 ft (340 m)

Population (2020)
  - Total: 1,052
  - Density: 15.20/sq mi (5.867/km^{2})
- Time zone: UTC-6 (Central (CST))
  - Summer (DST): UTC-5 (CDT)
- Area code: 608
- FIPS code: 55-15075
- GNIS feature ID: 1582966
- Website: https://claytontownshipcrawfordcowi.gov/

Clayton is a town in Crawford County, Wisconsin, United States. The population was 1,052 at the 2020 census. The unincorporated communities of Montgomeryville, North Clayton, and Yankeetown are located in the town.

== Geography ==
According to the United States Census Bureau, the town has a total area of 69.2 square miles (179.3 km^{2}), all land.

== Demographics ==
As of the census of 2000, there were 956 people, 364 households, and 279 families residing in the town. The population density was 13.8 people per square mile (5.3/km^{2}). There were 524 housing units at an average density of 7.6 per square mile (2.9/km^{2}). The racial makeup of the town was 96.03% White, 0.42% African American, 0.42% Native American, 0.42% Asian, 1.57% from other races, and 1.15% from two or more races. Hispanic or Latino of any race were 2.51% of the population.

There were 364 households, out of which 32.1% had children under the age of 18 living with them, 62.6% were married couples living together, 9.3% had a female householder with no husband present, and 23.1% were non-families. 20.3% of all households were made up of individuals, and 6.9% had someone living alone who was 65 years of age or older. The average household size was 2.63 and the average family size was 2.99.

In the town, the population was spread out, with 26.3% under the age of 18, 6.2% from 18 to 24, 26.0% from 25 to 44, 28.6% from 45 to 64, and 13.0% who were 65 years of age or older. The median age was 40 years. For every 100 females, there were 105.6 males. For every 100 females age 18 and over, there were 106.7 males.

The median income for a household in the town was $30,433, and the median income for a family was $31,875. Males had a median income of $23,182 versus $20,221 for females. The per capita income for the town was $13,786. About 13.1% of families and 18.1% of the population were below the poverty line, including 26.2% of those under age 18 and 12.3% of those age 65 or over.
