= Wauzeka, Wisconsin =

Wauzeka, Wisconsin.
- Village
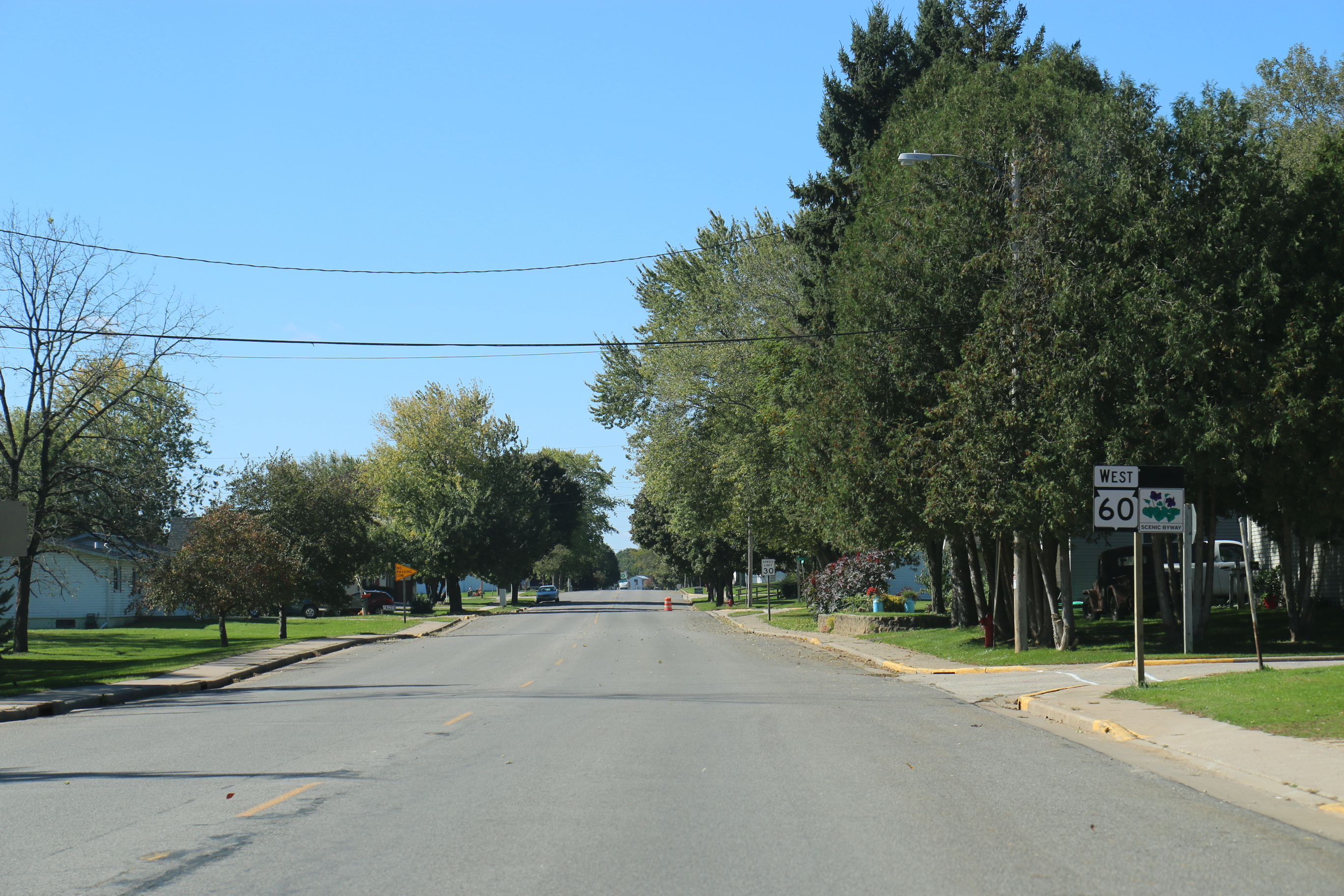

- Location of Wauzeka in Crawford County, Wisconsin.
- Coordinates: 43°5′6″N 90°53′1″W
- Country: United States
- State: Wisconsin
- County: Crawford

Area
  - Total: 4.84 sq mi (12.53 km^{2})
  - Land: 4.82 sq mi (12.49 km^{2})
  - Water: 0.015 sq mi (0.04 km^{2})
- Elevation: 863 ft (263 m)

Population (2020)
  - Total: 628
  - Density: 130/sq mi (50.3/km^{2})
- Time zone: UTC-6 (Central (CST))
  - Summer (DST): UTC-5 (CDT)
- Area code: 608
- FIPS code: 55-84725
- GNIS feature ID: 1576337
- Website: https://www.wauzekavillage.com/

Wauzeka is a village in Crawford County, Wisconsin, United States. The population was 628 at the 2020 census. The village is located within the Town of Wauzeka near the confluence of the Kickapoo River and Wisconsin River.

== History ==
The village of Wauzeka was platted in 1856 by Hercules L. Dousman, with an addition in 1857 by local Mexican–American War veteran John McHarg. It was named after a Native American leader whose Ho-Chunk name, Waaziga, means Pine Tree. The village was connected to the Milwaukee & Mississippi Railroad in 1857 and possessed various sawmills in the nineteenth century to process pine lumber rafted down the Kickapoo River.

== Geography ==
Wauzeka is located at 43°5′6″N 90°53′1″W (43.085232, −90.883614).

According to the United States Census Bureau, the village has a total area of 4.84 square miles (12.54 km^{2}), of which 4.82 square miles (12.48 km^{2}) is land and 0.02 square miles (0.05 km^{2}) is water.

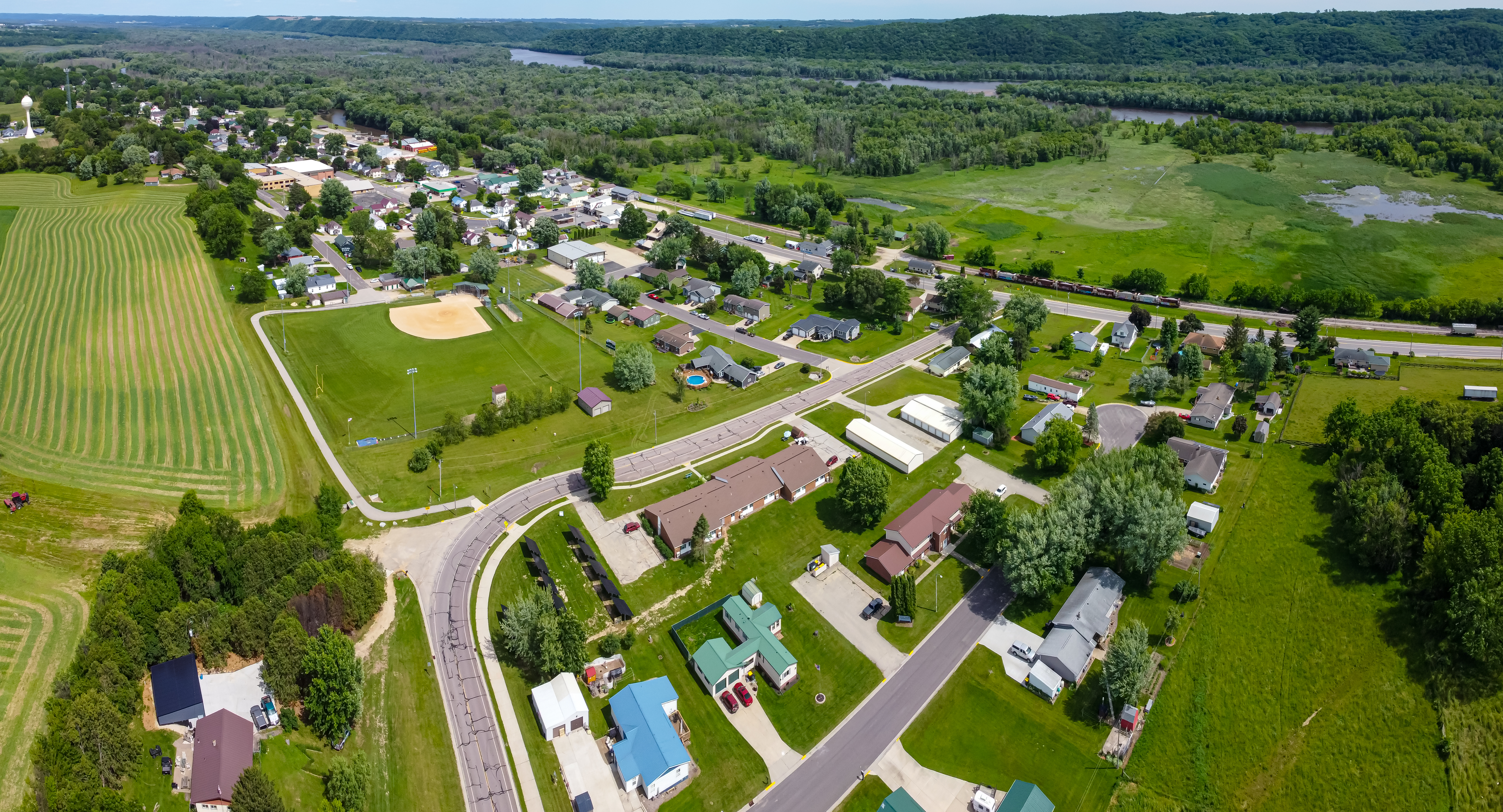
Wis-60 runs through town

== Demographics ==
Historical population
Census	Pop.	Note	%±
1900	471		—
1910	476		1.1%
1920	479		0.6%
1930	519		8.4%
1940	513		−1.2%
1950	564		9.9%
1960	494		−12.4%
1970	437		−11.5%
1980	580		32.7%
1990	595		2.6%
2000	768		29.1%
2010	711		−7.4%
2020	628		−11.7%
U.S. Decennial Census

=== 2020 census ===
As of the 2020 census, the population was 628. The population density was 130.2 inhabitants per square mile (50.3/km^{2}). There were 305 housing units at an average density of 63.3 per square mile (24.4/km^{2}). The racial makeup of the village was 94.4% White, 0.6% Asian, 0.5% Native American, 0.2% Black or African American, 0.3% from other races, and 4.0% from two or more races. Ethnically, the population was 0.5% Hispanic or Latino of any race.

=== 2010 census ===
As of the 2010 census there were 711 people, 273 households, and 184 families living in the village. The population density was 147.5 inhabitants per square mile (57.0/km^{2}). There were 304 housing units at an average density of 63.1 per square mile (24.4/km^{2}). The racial makeup of the village was 95.8% White, 1.0% African American, 0.1% Native American, 0.3% Asian, 1.1% from other races, and 1.7% from two or more races. Hispanic or Latino of any race were 1.8% of the population.

There were 273 households, of which 37.0% had children under the age of 18 living with them, 46.9% were married couples living together, 13.9% had a female householder with no husband present, 6.6% had a male householder with no wife present, and 32.6% were non-families. 24.2% of all households were made up of individuals, and 9.9% had someone living alone who was 65 years of age or older. The average household size was 2.60 and the average family size was 3.04.

The median age in the village was 33 years. 28.8% of residents were under the age of 18; 8.1% were between the ages of 18 and 24; 27.5% were from 25 to 44; 26% were from 45 to 64; and 9.6% were 65 years of age or older. The gender makeup of the village was 49.8% male and 50.2% female.

=== 2000 census ===
As of the 2000 census there were 768 people, 271 households, and 188 families living in the village. The population density was 155.1 people per square mile (59.9/km^{2}). There were 298 housing units at an average density of 60.2 per square mile (23.2/km^{2}). The racial makeup of the village was 98.18% White, 1.43% Asian, 0.13% from other races, and 0.26% from two or more races. 0.65% of the population were Hispanic or Latino of any race.

There were 271 households, out of which 43.5% had children under the age of 18 living with them, 52.4% were married couples living together, 10.7% had a female householder with no husband present, and 30.6% were non-families. 26.6% of all households were made up of individuals, and 13.3% had someone living alone who was 65 years of age or older. The average household size was 2.82 and the average family size was 3.39.

In the village, the population was spread out, with 33.5% under the age of 18, 8.7% from 18 to 24, 29.3% from 25 to 44, 17.1% from 45 to 64, and 11.5% who were 65 years of age or older. The median age was 31 years. For every 100 females, there were 97.9 males. For every 100 females age 18 and over, there were 95.0 males.

The median income for a household in the village was $40,556, and the median income for a family was $46,000. Males had a median income of $29,737 versus $19,815 for females. The per capita income for the village was $16,115. About 8.9% of families and 11.4% of the population were below the poverty line, including 13.8% of those under age 18 and 12.8% of those age 65 or over.

== Notable people ==
- Cyrus L. Lathrop, Wisconsin farmer and legislator, was born in Wauzeka.
- Jeremiah O'Neil, Wisconsin judge and legislator, lived in Wauzeka.

== Images ==
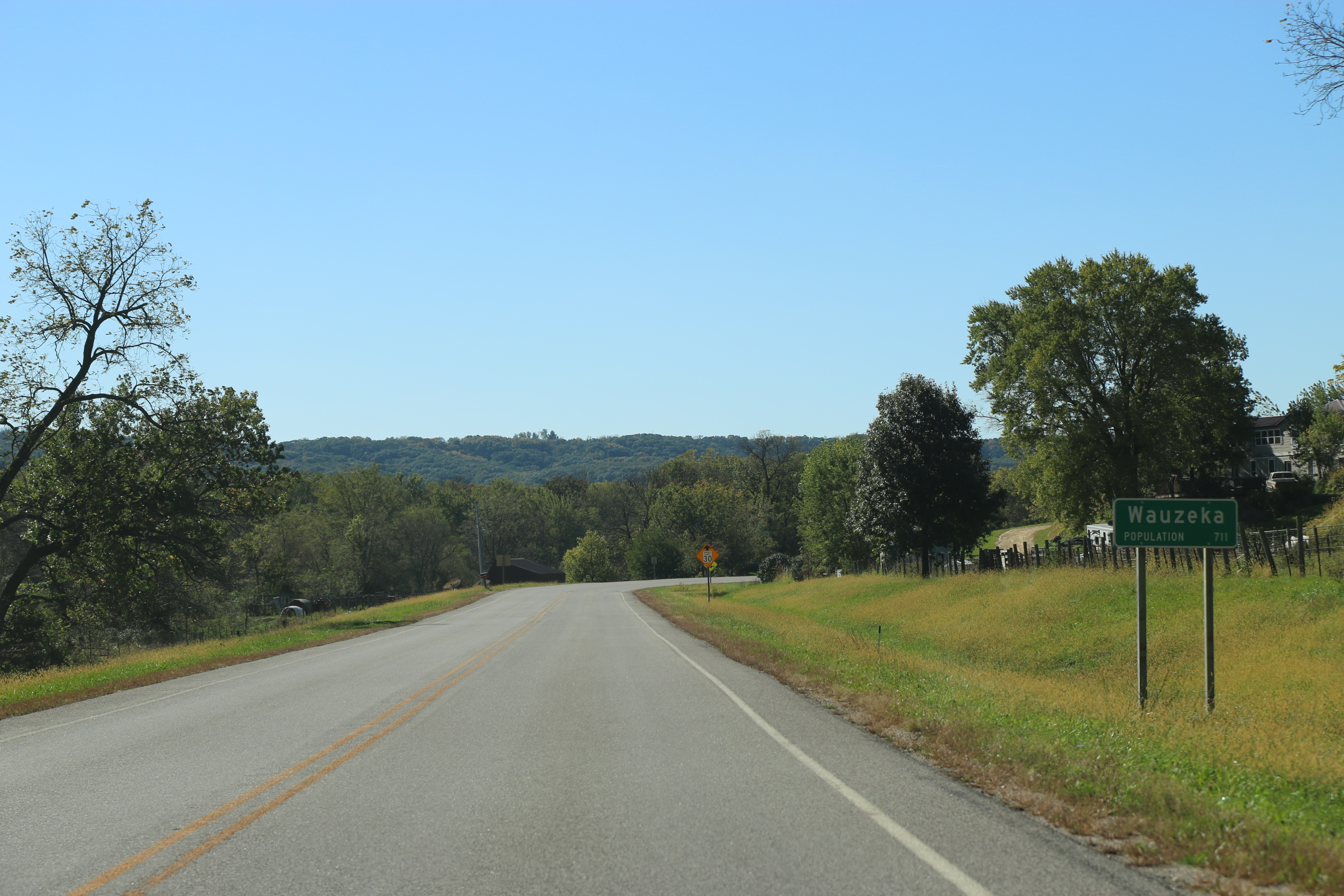
Sign on WIS60

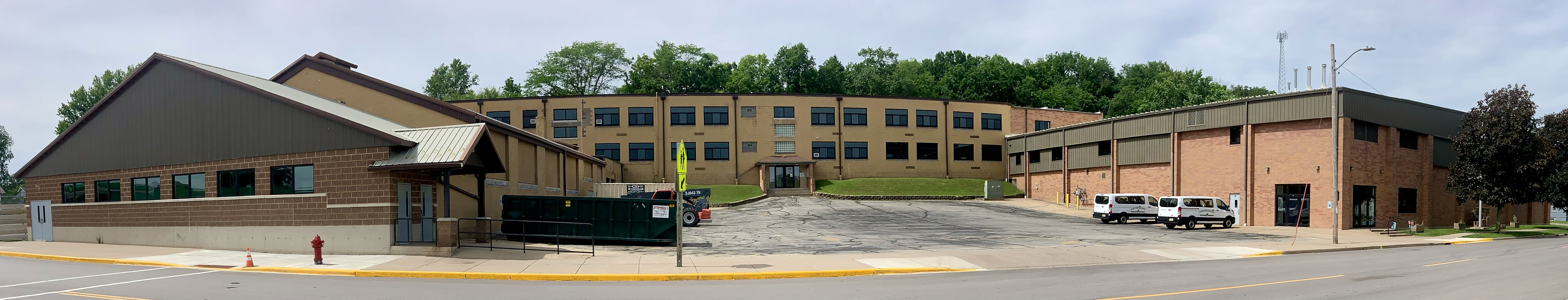
Wauzeka-Steuben Schools

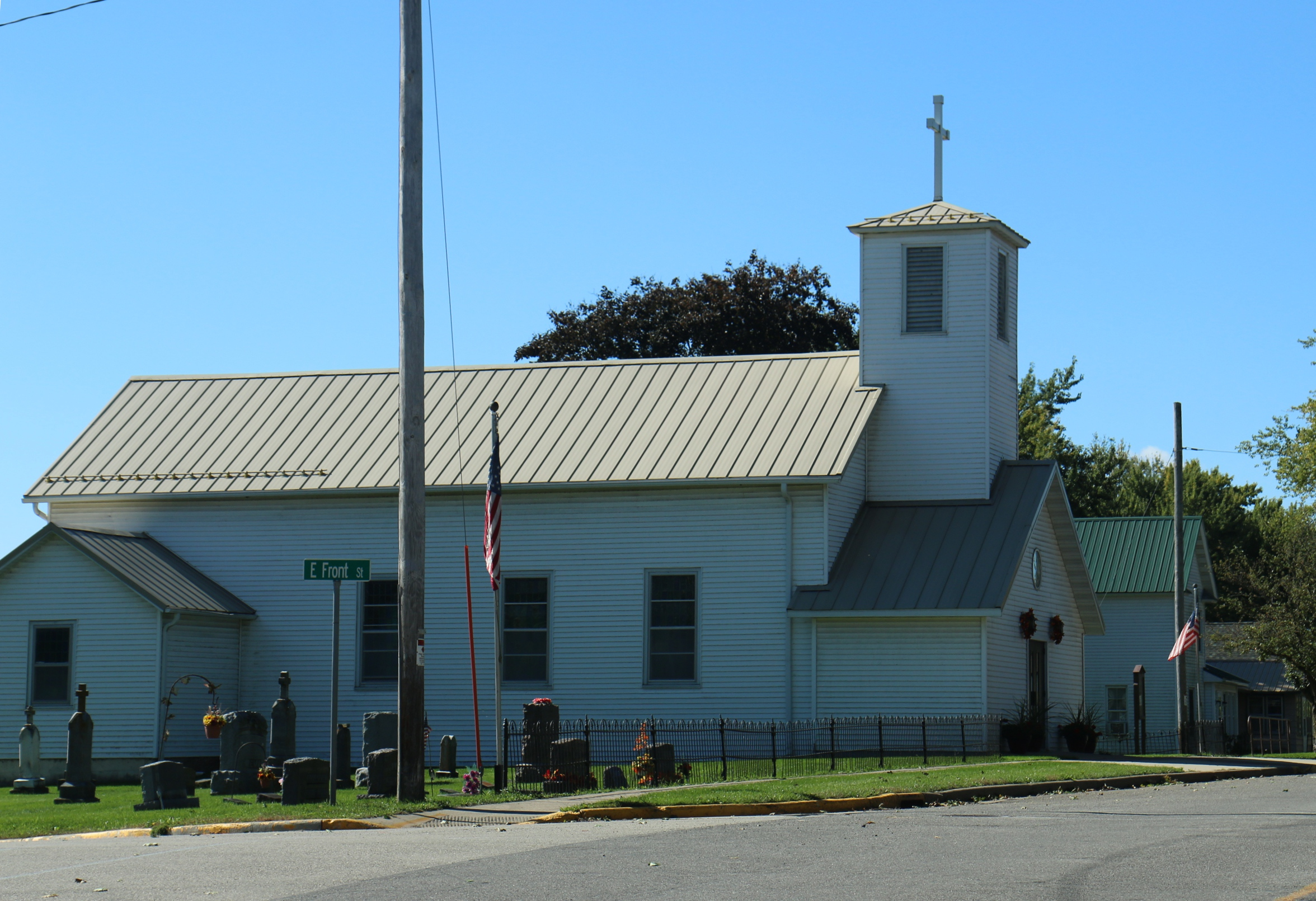
Sacred Heart Catholic Church

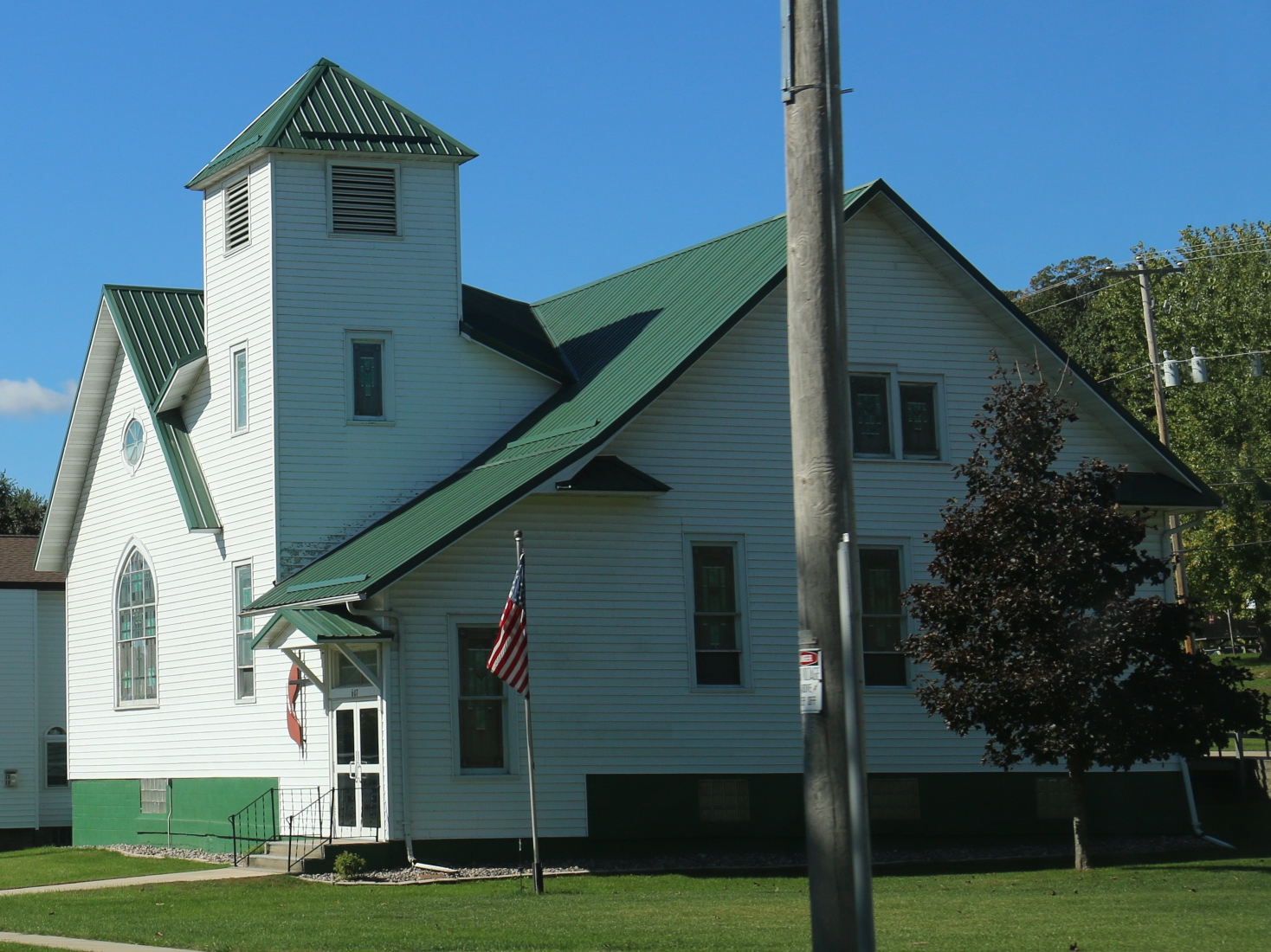
Wauzeka United Methodist Church
