= Crawford County, Wisconsin =

County in Wisconsin, United States

- County
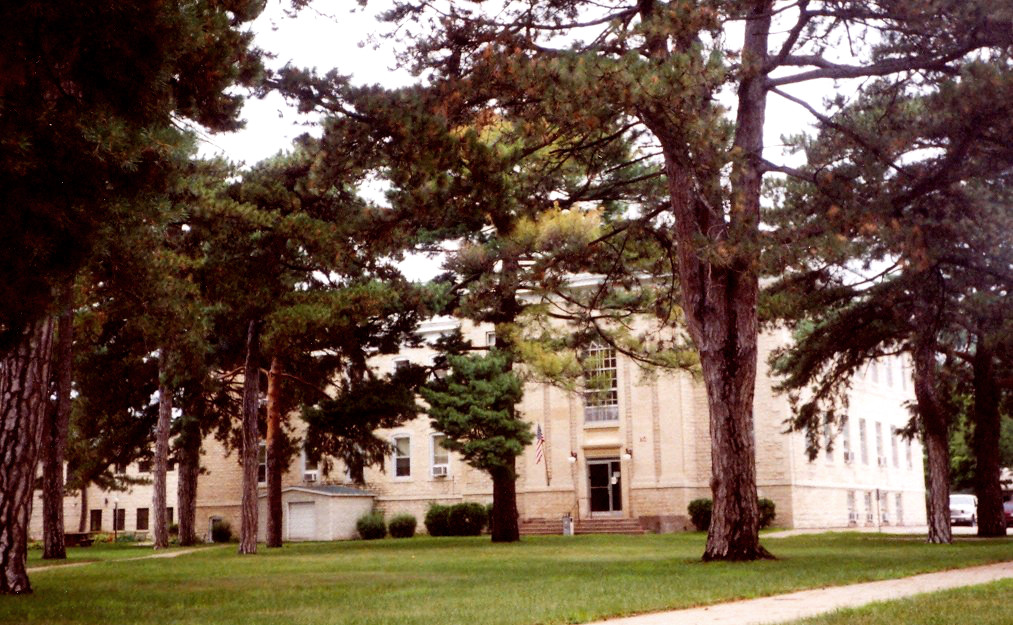
- Crawford County Courthouse

- Location within the U.S. state of Wisconsin
- Coordinates: 43°14′N 90°56′W
- Country: United States
- State: Wisconsin
- Founded: 1818
- Named for: William H. Crawford
- Seat: Prairie du Chien
- Largest city: Prairie du Chien

Area
  - Total: 599 sq mi (1,550 km^{2})
  - Land: 571 sq mi (1,480 km^{2})
  - Water: 29 sq mi (75 km^{2}) 4.8%

Population (2020)
  - Total: 16,113
  - Estimate (2025): 15,910 ▼
  - Density: 27.8/sq mi (10.7/km^{2})
- Time zone: UTC−6 (Central)
  - Summer (DST): UTC−5 (CDT)
- Congressional district: 3rd
- Website: www.crawfordcountywi.gov

Crawford County is a county in the southwestern part of the U.S. state of Wisconsin. As of the 2020 census, the population was 16,113. Its county seat is Prairie du Chien.

== History ==
Along with Brown County, Crawford County is one of Wisconsin's original counties, established by the Michigan Territorial legislature in 1818, and named after William H. Crawford, James Monroe's Treasurer at the time. It originally covered the western half of Wisconsin's present area. In 1836, it was transferred to the newly formed Wisconsin Territory as Michigan prepared for statehood and has gradually been subdivided into its present area.

== Geography ==
According to the U.S. Census Bureau, the county has an area of 599 square miles (1,550 km^{2}), of which 571 square miles (1,480 km^{2}) is land and 29 square miles (75 km^{2}) (4.8%) is water. The county's highest point is near St. James Church in Rising Sun.

Three rivers run through the county: The Kickapoo River, nicknamed "the crookedest river in Wisconsin" was carved out by glacial run-off. It is considered one of the best Class 1 paddling rivers in the Midwest.

- The Wisconsin River borders the county's southern edge. Although it is the state's busiest river, its run within the county is tranquil, with high bluff escarpments and sandy islands.
- The Mississippi River, serves as the county's western border. The steep limestone cliffs are interspersed with bluffs and prairies.

=== Adjacent counties ===
- Vernon County – north
- Richland County – east
- Grant County – south
- Clayton County, Iowa – southwest
- Allamakee County, Iowa – west

== Demographics ==
Historical population
Census	Pop.	Note	%±
1840	1,502		—
1850	2,498		66.3%
1860	8,068		223.0%
1870	13,075		62.1%
1880	15,644		19.6%
1890	15,987		2.2%
1900	17,286		8.1%
1910	16,288		−5.8%
1920	16,772		3.0%
1930	16,781		0.1%
1940	18,328		9.2%
1950	17,652		−3.7%
1960	16,351		−7.4%
1970	15,252		−6.7%
1980	16,556		8.5%
1990	15,940		−3.7%
2000	17,243		8.2%
2010	16,644		−3.5%
2020	16,113		−3.2%
2025 (est.)	15,910	▼	−1.3%
U.S. Decennial Census:

=== Racial and ethnic composition ===
Crawford County, Wisconsin – Racial and ethnic composition Note: the US Census treats Hispanic/Latino as an ethnic category. This table excludes Latinos from the racial categories and assigns them to a separate category. Hispanics/Latinos may be of any race.
Race / ethnicity (NH = Non-Hispanic)	Pop 1980	Pop 1990	Pop 2000	Pop 2010	Pop 2020	% 1980	% 1990	% 2000	% 2010	% 2020
White alone (NH)	16,452	15,747	16,693	15,991	15,018	99.37%	98.79%	96.81%	96.08%	93.20%
Black or African American alone (NH)	14	46	230	288	265	0.08%	0.29%	1.33%	1.73%	1.64%
Native American or Alaska Native alone (NH)	20	23	37	36	41	0.12%	0.14%	0.21%	0.22%	0.25%
Asian alone (NH)	18	56	45	63	68	0.11%	0.35%	0.26%	0.38%	0.42%
Native Hawaiian or Pacific Islander alone (NH)	x	x	2	3	1	x	x	0.01%	0.02%	0.01%
Other race alone (NH)	9	1	5	3	34	0.05%	0.01%	0.03%	0.02%	0.21%
Mixed race or Multiracial (NH)	x	x	102	110	426	x	x	0.59%	0.66%	2.64%
Hispanic or Latino (any race)	43	67	129	150	260	0.26%	0.42%	0.75%	0.90%	1.61%
Total	16,556	15,940	17,243	16,644	16,113	100.00%	100.00%	100.00%	100.00%	100.00%

=== 2020 census ===
As of the 2020 census, the county had a population of 16,113. The median age was 46.6 years, with 20.5% of residents under the age of 18 and 24.0% aged 65 years or older. For every 100 females there were 109.0 males, and for every 100 females age 18 and over there were 108.8 males age 18 and over.

The population density was 28.2 people per square mile (10.9 people/km^{2}). There were 8,658 housing units at an average density of 15.2 units per square mile (5.9 units/km^{2}), of which 21.9% were vacant.

The racial makeup of the county was 93.8% White, 1.7% Black or African American, 0.3% American Indian and Alaska Native, 0.4% Asian, <0.1% Native Hawaiian and Pacific Islander, 0.4% from some other race, and 3.4% from two or more races. Hispanic or Latino residents of any race comprised 1.6% of the population.

37.0% of residents lived in urban areas, while 63.0% lived in rural areas.

There were 6,760 households in the county, of which 24.2% had children under the age of 18 living in them. Of all households, 49.3% were married-couple households, 20.7% were households with a male householder and no spouse or partner present, and 22.5% were households with a female householder and no spouse or partner present. About 31.4% of all households were made up of individuals and 15.3% had someone living alone who was 65 years of age or older.

Among occupied housing units, 75.3% were owner-occupied and 24.7% were renter-occupied. The homeowner vacancy rate was 2.3% and the rental vacancy rate was 9.2%.

=== 2020 American Community Survey Estimates ===
According to the most recent American Community Survey estimates available in 2020, the five largest ancestries, whether partially claimed or claimed in full, were: 36.37% were of German; 19.15% Irish; 13.87% Norwegian; 7.57% English; and 4.77% Czech or Czechoslovak.

There were 6,676 households, out of which 20.78% had children under the age of 18 living with them, 49.30% were married couples living together, 23.20% had a female householder with no husband present, and 42.99% were non-families. 17.20% of all households were made up of individuals, and 6.10% had someone living alone who was 65 years of age or older. The average household size was 2.30 and the average family size was 2.93. Of all households in the county, 74.4% of households were owner-occupied, and 25.6% were renter-occupied households.

In the county, the population age distribution is 21.90% under the age of 20, 15.86% from 20 to 34, 10.54% from 35 to 44, 28.38% from 45 to 64, and 23.38% who were 65 years of age or older. The median age was 47 years. For every 100 females there were 108 males. For every 100 females age 18 and over, there were 107.9 males. In total, 52% of the population was male, and 48% of the population was female.

=== 2010 Census ===
2000 Census Age Pyramid for Crawford County

As of the census of 2010, there were 16,644 people, 6,677 households, and 4,613 families residing in the county. The population density was 12 people per square mile (4.6 people/km^{2}). There were 8,480 housing units at an average density of 6 units per square mile (2.3 units/km^{2}). The racial makeup of the county was 96.61% White, 1.78% Black or African American, 0.23% Native American, 0.38% Asian, 0.01% Pacific Islander, 0.17% from other races, and 0.68% from two or more races. 0.9% of the population were Hispanic or Latino of any race. 33.6% were of German, 16.0% Norwegian, 11.4% Irish, 7.2% Czech, 7.2% English and 6.4% United States or American ancestry.

There were 6,677 households, out of which 31.60% had children under the age of 18 living with them, 56.70% were married couples living together, 8.40% had a female householder with no husband present, and 30.90% were non-families. 26.70% of all households were made up of individuals, and 13.00% had someone living alone who was 65 years of age or older. The average household size was 2.48 and the average family size was 3.00.

In the county, the population age distribution is 24.25% under the age of 20, 8.10% from 18 to 24, 26.20% from 20 to 44, 31.16% from 45 to 64, and 18.40% who were 65 years of age or older. The median age was 39 years. For every 100 females there were 102.20 males. For every 100 females age 18 and over, there were 99.30 males.

== Transportation ==
=== Major highways ===
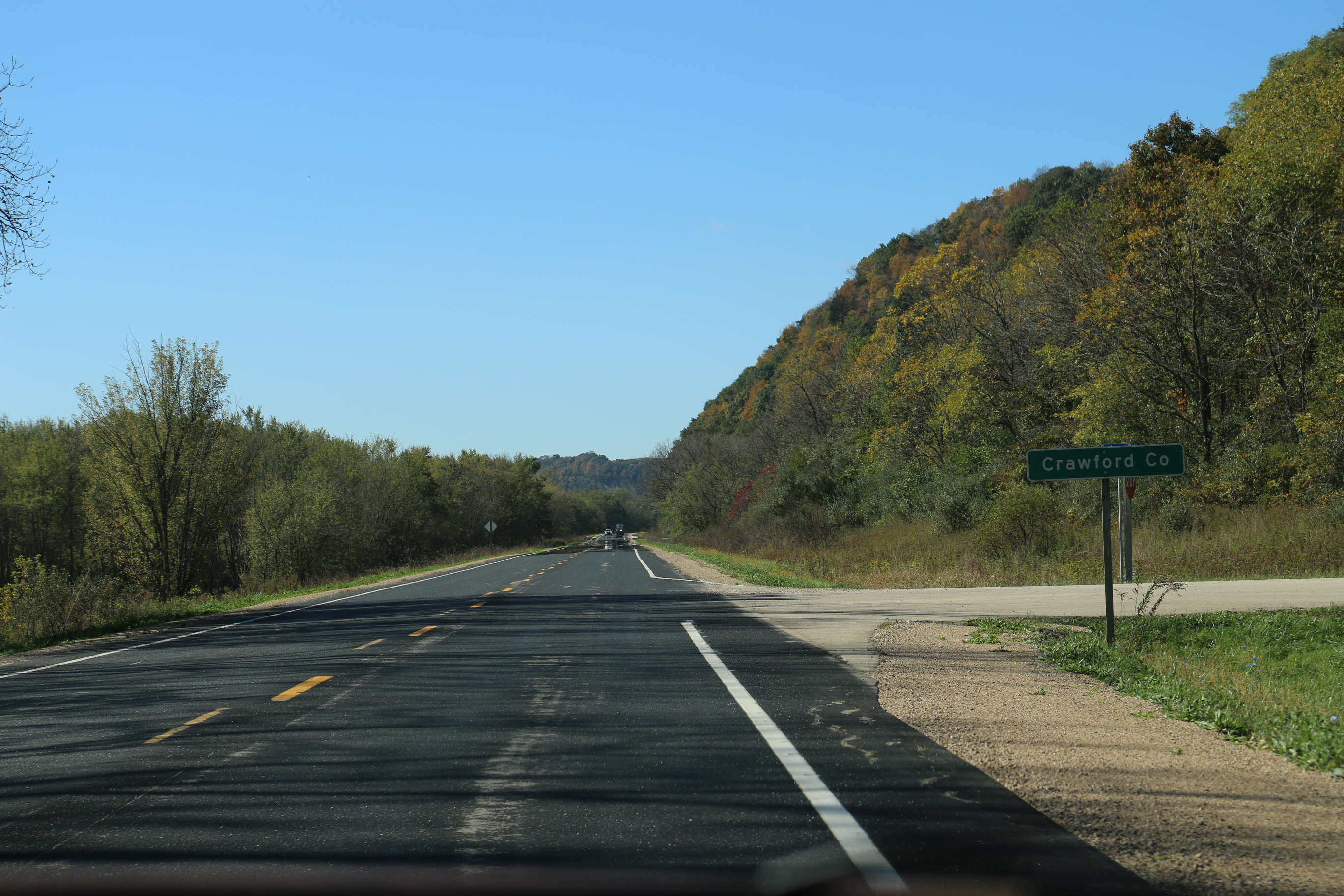
The sign for Crawford County on WIS60

- U.S. Highway 18
- U.S. Highway 61
- Highway 27 (Wisconsin)
- Highway 35 (Wisconsin)
- Highway 60 (Wisconsin)
- Highway 82 (Wisconsin)
- Highway 131 (Wisconsin)
- Highway 171 (Wisconsin)
- Highway 179 (Wisconsin)

=== Railroads ===
- BNSF
- Wisconsin and Southern Railroad

=== Buses ===
- Scenic Mississippi Regional Transit

=== Airport ===
Prairie du Chien Municipal Airport (KPDC) serves Crawford County and the surrounding communities.

== Communities ==
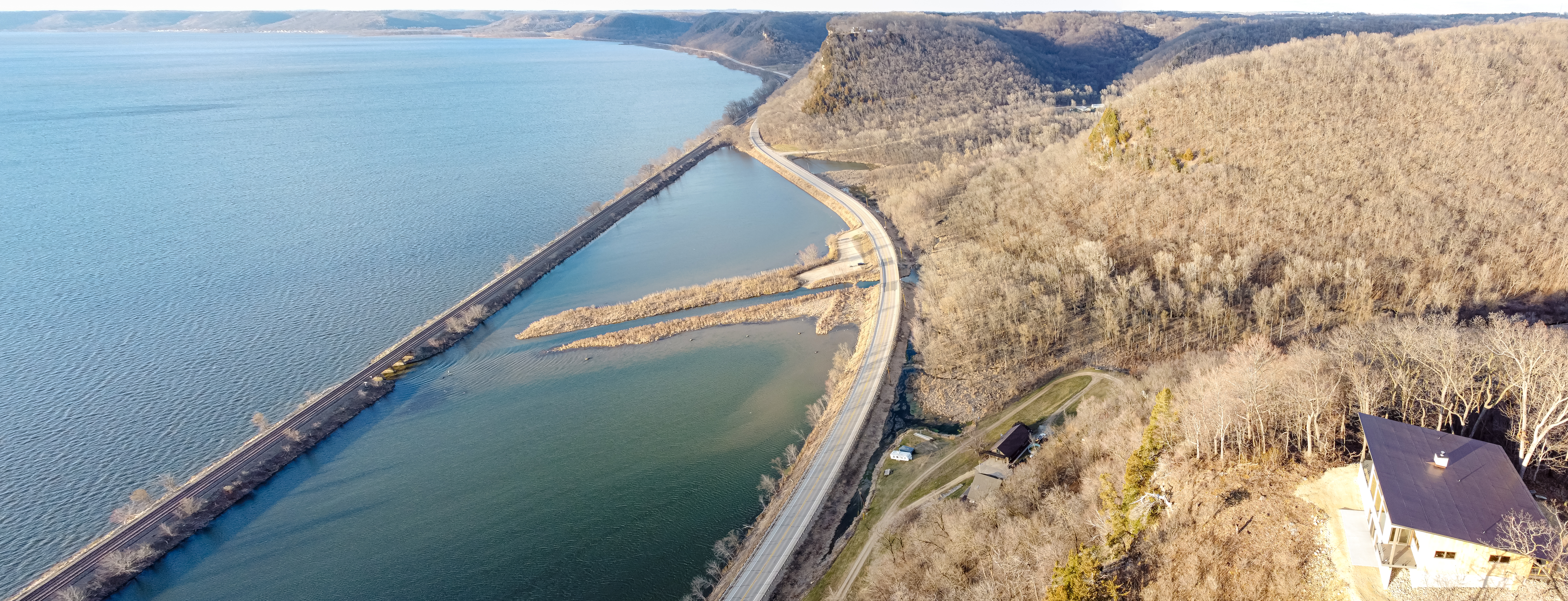
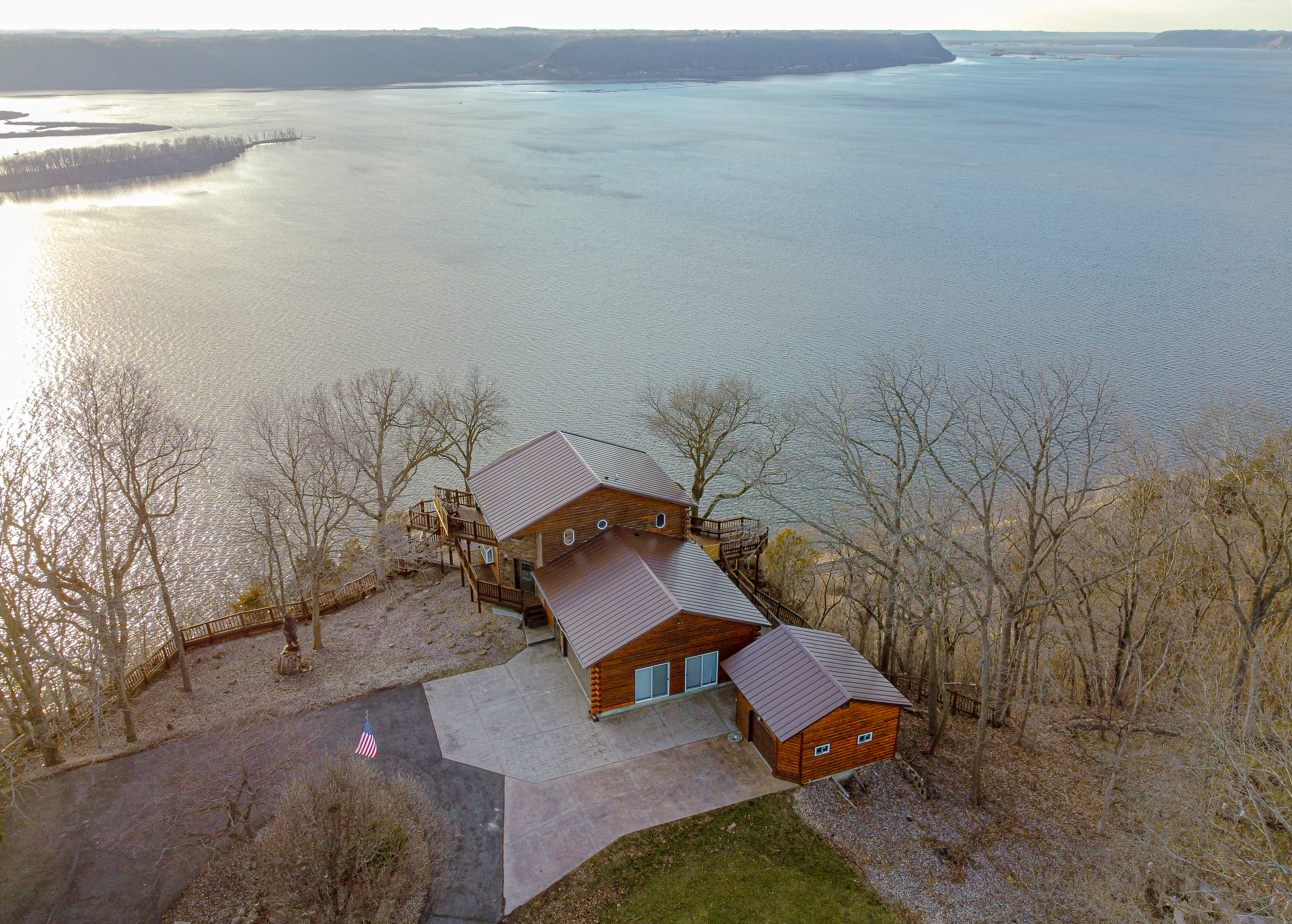
Houses in the Driftless Area on the Upper Mississippi River north of Lynxville

=== Cities ===
- Prairie du Chien (county seat)

=== Villages ===
- Bell Center
- De Soto (Mostly in Vernon County)
- Eastman
- Ferryville
- Gays Mills
- Lynxville
- Mount Sterling
- Soldiers Grove
- Steuben
- Wauzeka

=== Towns ===
- Bridgeport
- Clayton
- Eastman
- Freeman
- Haney
- Marietta
- Prairie du Chien
- Scott
- Seneca
- Utica
- Wauzeka

=== Census-designated place ===
- Seneca

=== Unincorporated communities ===
- Barnum
- Boydtown
- Bridgeport
- Charme
- Easter Rock
- Fairview
- Harmony Hill
- Montgomeryville
- Mount Zion
- North Clayton
- Petersburg
- Pine Knob
- Plugtown
- Reed
- Rising Sun
- Rolling Ground
- Towerville
- White Corners
- Yankeetown

== Politics ==
United States presidential election results for Crawford County, Wisconsin
Year	Republican		Democratic		Third party(ies)	
Year	No.	%	No.	%	No.	%
1892	1,727	49.91%	1,615	46.68%	118	3.41%
1896	2,323	59.61%	1,509	38.72%	65	1.67%
1900	2,333	62.53%	1,353	36.26%	45	1.21%
1904	2,279	61.08%	1,362	36.50%	90	2.41%
1908	2,041	54.25%	1,586	42.16%	135	3.59%
1912	1,407	41.66%	1,515	44.86%	455	13.47%
1916	1,883	50.63%	1,764	47.43%	72	1.94%
1920	3,600	74.29%	1,112	22.95%	134	2.77%
1924	1,687	29.82%	936	16.54%	3,035	53.64%
1928	3,452	51.18%	3,238	48.01%	55	0.82%
1932	1,943	28.71%	4,754	70.24%	71	1.05%
1936	2,857	35.91%	4,377	55.02%	722	9.07%
1940	4,667	56.28%	3,595	43.35%	31	0.37%
1944	4,199	57.12%	3,130	42.58%	22	0.30%
1948	3,465	48.23%	3,639	50.65%	81	1.13%
1952	5,323	70.15%	2,256	29.73%	9	0.12%
1956	4,123	61.71%	2,522	37.75%	36	0.54%
1960	3,719	52.60%	3,342	47.26%	10	0.14%
1964	2,726	40.91%	3,930	58.98%	7	0.11%
1968	3,316	54.09%	2,391	39.00%	423	6.90%
1972	3,705	58.67%	2,487	39.38%	123	1.95%
1976	3,393	47.11%	3,629	50.39%	180	2.50%
1980	3,934	50.08%	3,392	43.18%	530	6.75%
1984	4,412	55.87%	3,436	43.51%	49	0.62%
1988	3,238	46.98%	3,608	52.34%	47	0.68%
1992	2,390	30.59%	3,540	45.31%	1,882	24.09%
1996	2,149	30.44%	3,658	51.81%	1,253	17.75%
2000	3,024	40.90%	4,005	54.17%	365	4.94%
2004	3,680	43.50%	4,656	55.04%	123	1.45%
2008	2,830	35.46%	4,987	62.49%	164	2.05%
2012	3,067	39.24%	4,629	59.22%	121	1.55%
2016	3,836	49.64%	3,419	44.24%	473	6.12%
2020	4,620	53.13%	3,953	45.46%	122	1.40%
2024	5,113	56.16%	3,860	42.39%	132	1.45%

When the county was founded, Crawford County was a Republican stronghold, having voted for the Republican presidential candidate every year from 1892 to 1908, and having only voted Democrat once from 1892 to 1920. The county leaned Republican for many years, until 1988 when Michael Dukakis won it by a margin of 5.3 percentage points. The county voted for the Democratic presidential candidate every year from 1988 to 2012. In 2016, Donald Trump won Crawford County by 5.4 percentage points. Trump would win it again in 2020 by a larger margin of 7.8 percentage points, marking the first time the county voted for a Republican back to back election cycles since 1984 when Ronald Reagan carried Crawford County. Trump won Crawford County for a third time in 2024, once again increasing his margin of victory, this time to 13.8 percentage points, the best Republican performance in the county since the 1972 landslide reelection of Richard Nixon.

== Education ==
School districts include:

- Boscobel Area School District
- De Soto Area School District
- Kickapoo Area School District
- North Crawford School District
- Prairie du Chien Area School District
- Riverdale School District
- Seneca School District
- Wauzeka-Steuben School District

== See also ==
- National Register of Historic Places listings in Crawford County, Wisconsin
- Upper Mississippi River National Wildlife and Fish Refuge
