= Wisconsin tornado outbreak of 2005 =

Weather event in the United States

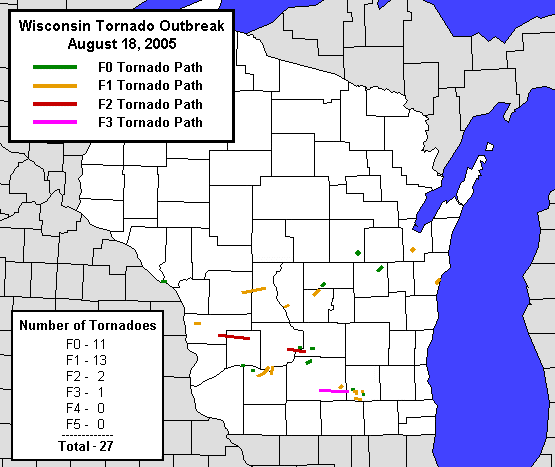
- Paths of the August 18th Tornadoes.

Meteorological history
- Duration: August 18, 2005

Tornado outbreak
- Tornadoes: 28 confirmed
- Max. rating: F3 tornado
- Duration: 8 hours, 40 minutes

Overall effects
- Fatalities: 1
- Injuries: 27
- Damage: $42.537 million
- Areas affected: Minnesota, Wisconsin

The Wisconsin tornado outbreak of 2005 was an outbreak of tornadoes that occurred primarily in southern Wisconsin on August 18, 2005. A system of storms unleashed a total of 28 tornadoes, 27 of which were confirmed in southern Wisconsin, and 1 confirmed in Minnesota. This outbreak set a new record for the most tornadoes observed in the state in a single day, breaking the previous record of 24 tornadoes set on May 8, 1988. The system generating the Stoughton tornado was accompanied by severe winds and hail throughout the entire region. The Stoughton tornado was documented on an episode of The Weather Channel's Storm Stories.

== Tornadoes ==
Confirmed tornadoes by Fujita rating
FU	F0	F1	F2	F3	F4	F5	Total
0	11	14	2	1	0	0	28

=== August 18 event ===
List of confirmed tornadoes - Thursday, August 18, 2005
F#	Location	County	Time (UTC)	Path Length	Comments/Damage
Minnesota
F0	N of Dexter	Mower	1750–1751	0.1 miles (0.16 km)	A brief tornado damaged a single livestock barn and flattened part of a corn field.
Wisconsin
F0	W of Centerville	Trempealeau	1918–1919	0.1 miles (0.16 km)	Tornado knocked down several trees in a grove along its extremely short path.
F1	W of Esofea	Vernon	2046–2048	1.2 miles (1.9 km)	One mobile home, which was on cement blocks, was completely destroyed, injuring one person. Another residence had minor damage, where windows were blown out, outbuildings were destroyed and a car was turned 90 degrees. Power poles were snapped, corn was flattened, and significant tree damage occurred as well.
F2	W of Liberty to W of Hub City	Vernon, Richland	2105–2140	20 miles (32 km)	Considerable damage occurred in the village of Viola, with most homes in the village sustaining at least minor damage, while a few sustained major damage, including roofs blown off. Many garages facing west or southwest were destroyed by the direct impact of the winds. Almost every tree in town was damaged or downed, and three people were injured. Minor damage also occurred in rural areas and in Bloom City.
F1	Muscoda to Orion	Grant, Richland	2140	4 miles (6.4 km)	Tornado touched down in Muscoda, where many trees were downed and homes sustained minor damage. In Orion, the tornado damaged several mobile homes, some of which were tossed into the air.
F1	Necedah area	Monroe, Juneau	2154	2 miles (3.2 km)	There was tree, agricultural, and structural damage along the path. A home, which was under construction, was completely destroyed. Three other homes sustained minor damage. Corn was flattened and there was significant tree damage as well.
F0	ENE of Avoca	Iowa	2155	0.1 miles (0.16 km)	Minor trees damage occurred.
F1	NNE of Clyde	Iowa, Sauk	2218	6.5 miles (10.5 km)	Tornado damaged trees, power lines, and corn.
F1	SSW of Spring Green	Sauk	2230	1.9 miles (3.1 km)	Tornado damaged trees, power lines, and crops.
F0	WSW of Wautoma	Waushara	2232	2 miles (3.2 km)	Tornado snapped off and uprooted numerous trees, and caused damage to a few buildings and some farm equipment before dissipating. A tree fell onto a large pole building, causing major damage to one of its sides, and the porch at a residence was destroyed by a fallen tree limb. A portion of the metal roof of a barn was torn away and thrown about 200 feet. An irrigation system was damaged and a home suffered minor shingle damage as well.
F1	S of Adams	Adams	2239	0.75 miles (1.21 km)	Several mobile homes and trees were damaged.
F2	NE of Leland to SE of Okee	Sauk, Columbia	2240	10 miles (16 km)	Rain-wrapped tornado moved through old Badger Ammunition Plant grounds and damaged many structures, trees, and power-lines. As for residential buildings, 10 received minor damage, 1 had major damage, and one was destroyed. One business building had minor damage. As for agricultural buildings, 5 received minor damage, and 6 were destroyed. Damage in Columbia County was limited to trees, power lines, and crops.
F0	W of Merrimac	Sauk	2300	1 mile (1.6 km)	Tornado spotted along the Wisconsin River damaged trees and power lines.
F1	NNE of Westfield	Marquette	2308	5.5 miles (8.9 km)	On one property, a residential home sustained minor roof damage, and there was minor damage to two out-buildings and farm equipment/machinery. On another property, minor damage to a silo was noted. Extensive tree and power-line damage was reported along the entire path of the tornado.
F0	NNE of Lodi	Columbia	2310	0.1 miles (160 m)	Minor vegetative damage occurred.
F3	N of Oregon to SE of Utica	Dane, Jefferson	2315	20 miles (32 km)	1 death - See section on this tornado.
F0	WSW of Dane	Dane	2317	2 miles (3.2 km)	Corn crop was damaged.
F0	SW of New London	Waupaca	2338	1.2 miles (1.9 km)	Tornado snapped off large trees and damaged a few buildings along its path. It shifted a large barn, and destroyed a small metal shed and threw it about a quarter mile. It also overturned an outbuilding and threw it 30 to 40 feet into a stand of trees.
F0	W of Neenah	Winnebago	2340	4 miles (6.4 km)	Many trees were uprooted or snapped. The tornado ripped the siding from a home and flattened a corn crib.
F1	SSW of Rockdale	Dane	0010	1.6 miles (2.6 km)	Many large trees were uprooted, destroyed or twisted, and minor damage was inflicted on 3 homes and one pole shed. In addition, power-lines were knocked down.
F0	W of Fort Atkinson	Jefferson	0010	0.5 miles (0.80 km)	Two mobile homes sustained minor damage. One residential home was also damaged and its 3-car garage was destroyed. One farm shed was destroyed, many large trees were uprooted, and minor crop damage was noted.
F1	W of Fort Atkinson	Jefferson	0020	0.7 miles (1.1 km)	A trailer with a truck inside was tipped over, resulting to damage to both. One residential home sustained minor damage, many large trees were uprooted or twisted, and minor crop damage was noted.
F1	WSW of Fort Atkinson	Jefferson	0027	1.2 miles (1.9 km)	One residential home sustained minor damage, two shed used for horses sustained roof and siding damage, many large trees were uprooted or twisted, and minor crop damage was noted.
F1	Fort Atkinson area	Jefferson	0037	1.4 miles (2.3 km)	This tornado moved due east through the southern part of the city of Fort Atkinson. Twenty residential homes and 5 businesses sustained minor damage, one business was destroyed, numerous many large trees were uprooted or twisted, some power-lines were damaged, and minor crop damage was noted. As for business losses, a portion of the roof of the Rock River Lanes was peeled back, the Best Western Motel had minor sign and roofing damage, and the Fort Plaza Mini Warehouse was destroyed.
F1	SSW of Fort Atkinson	Jefferson	0044	3 miles (4.8 km)	Tree damage and some minor crop damage was noted.
F0	SE of Fort Atkinson	Jefferson	0045	0.2 miles (320 m)	Several large trees were uprooted, one corn bin was ripped apart, and two other corn bins were damaged. Minor crop damage was noted as well.
F1	NE of Wrightstown	Brown	0045	1 mile (1.6 km)	About 75 trees were snapped or uprooted along the tornado path. Two wooden garages were destroyed, and the walls of a house under construction were blown down. A part of a steel roof was damaged, and a heavy wooden bench was lifted in the air and thrown several hundred feet away from the house.
F1	SW of Manitowoc	Manitowoc	0135	1.5 miles (2.4 km)	A farm was damaged and several dozen trees were snapped or uprooted. Several hay wagons and trailers were overturned, while a concrete silo was destroyed. One other silo was damaged, and the roof of a barn also sustained significant damage.

=== Stoughton, Wisconsin ===
Stoughton, Wisconsin
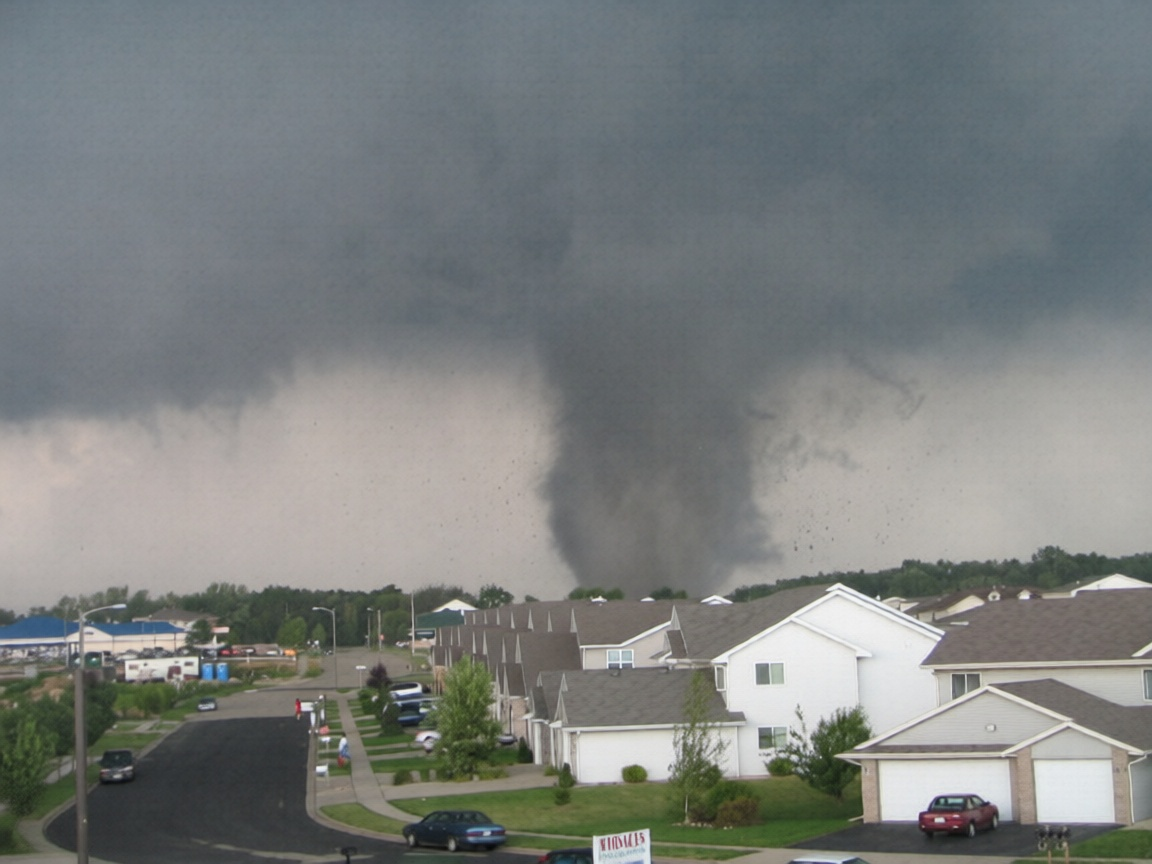
- The tornado as seen north of Stoughton.

Meteorological history
- Formed: August 18, 2005, 6:15 p.m. CDT (UTC−05:00)
- Dissipated: August 18, 2005, 7:08 p.m. CDT (UTC−05:00)
- Duration: 53 minutes

F3 tornado
- on the Fujita scale
- Highest winds: 158–206 mph (254–332 km/h)

Overall effects
- Fatalities: 1
- Injuries: 23
- Damage: $34.31 million

By far the most significant tornado of the day developed 2.0 miles (3.2 km) north of Oregon at 6:15 p.m.. This large, intense multiple-vortex tornado tracked 20.0 miles (32.2 km) into Jefferson County from Dane County, devastating the town of Stoughton.

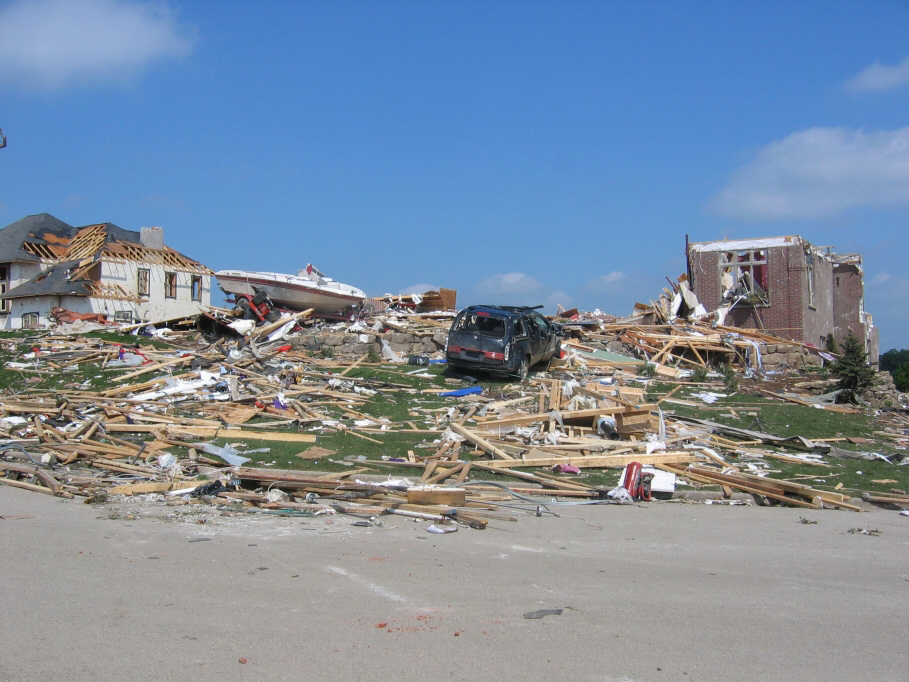
F3 damage to a house in Stoughton

East of Oregon the tornado tore through several farms before impacting residential subdivisions in Stoughton. One person was crushed to death in their basement from fireplace and chimney bricks that crashed through the floor. Numerous homes, businesses, farm buildings, vehicles, power-lines, trees, and other personal effects were either damaged or destroyed along its path that grew to a maximum width of about 600 yards north of Stoughton. As for residential structures, 220 sustained minor damage, 84 had major damage, and 69 were destroyed. As for business structures, 6 sustained minor damage, 1 had major damage, and 1 was destroyed. As for agricultural structures, 5 sustained minor damage, 5 had major damage, and 40 were destroyed. Several vehicles were flipped and tossed as well. Some homes in town were completely leveled, and an F4 rating was considered. Further investigation revealed that the homes were not well-built, and the slow (sometimes nearly stationary) forward movement of the tornado negated a rating higher than F3. After striking Stoughton, the tornado caused damage to trees and crops southeast of Utica before dissipating. Debris from this tornado was lofted by the parent updraft and carried downstream to scattered locations in the counties of Jefferson, Waukesha, Milwaukee, Walworth, Racine, and Kenosha. 23 people were injured.

Ten years later to the day, three tornadoes touched down outside of Lake Geneva, Big Bend, and Waukesha. There were no injuries or fatalities from those tornadoes.

== See also ==
- List of North American tornadoes and tornado outbreaks
- Tornadoes of 2005
- Southern Ontario tornado outbreak of 2005 – An outbreak the following day produced by the same area of low pressure.
