= Robert A. Nixon =

American lawyer and politician

Robert Arliegh Nixon (June 25, 1900 – November 17, 1948) was an American lawyer and politician.

Born in the town of Sterling, Vernon County, Wisconsin, Nixon went to Viroqua High School and George Washington University. While at the university Nixon served as secretary to Wisconsin congressmen Joseph D. Beck and Hubert H. Peavey. From 1927, Nixon practiced law in Washburn, Wisconsin. In 1930, Nixon served as secretary for the Republican State Platform Convention. Nixon served in the Wisconsin State Assembly from 1929 to 1934 and was the Progressive floor leader. Nixon then served as district attorney of Bayfield County, Wisconsin. In 1937, Wisconsin Governor Philip La Follette appointed Nixon to the Public Service Commission of Wisconsin, serving until 1942. In 1942, Nixon moved to Washington, D.C. and worked in the Office of Price Administration and then the National Housing Administration. Nixon died in a hospital in Washington, D.C. and was buried in Retreat, Wisconsin.
