= Webster, Wisconsin =

There are two municipalities named Webster in Wisconsin:

- Webster, Burnett County, Wisconsin, a village
- Webster, Vernon County, Wisconsin, a town
