= Wheatland, Wisconsin =

Wheatland is the name of some places in the U.S. state of Wisconsin:

- Wheatland, Kenosha County, Wisconsin, a town
- Wheatland, Vernon County, Wisconsin, a town
