= Francis A. Wallar =

Union Army officer, medal of honor recipient

Sheriff of Vernon County, Wisconsin
- In office January 1881 – January 1883
- Preceded by: James H. Hewey
- Succeeded by: S. R. Pollard

Personal details
- Born: August 15, 1840 Guernsey County, Ohio, U.S.
- Died: April 30, 1911 (aged 70) South Dakota, U.S.
- Resting place: Walnut Mound Cemetery, Retreat, Wisconsin
- Party: Republican

Military service
- Allegiance: United States
- Branch/service: United States Volunteers; Union Army
- Years of service: 1861–1865
- Rank: 1st Lieutenant, USV
- Unit: 6th Reg. Wis. Vol. Infantry
- Battles/wars: American Civil War
- Awards: Medal of Honor

Francis Asbury Wallar (August 15, 1840 – April 30, 1911) was a Union Army volunteer in the American Civil War and received the Medal of Honor for actions on the first day of the Battle of Gettysburg, July 1, 1863. He was a corporal in Company I of the 6th Wisconsin Infantry Regiment, in the Iron Brigade of the Army of the Potomac. During the battle, he engaged a Confederate soldier of the 2nd Mississippi Infantry Regiment in single combat, capturing him and seizing his battle flag.

Following the war he became Sheriff of Vernon County, Wisconsin. Wallar died in 1911 and was buried in Walnut Mound Cemetery in Retreat, Wisconsin. A plaque commemorating Wallar was installed at the cemetery in Retreat in 1961.

== Medal of Honor citation ==
Rank and organization: Corporal, Company I, 6th Wisconsin Infantry. Place and date: At Gettysburg, Pa., July 1, 1863. Entered service at: DeSoto, Vernon County, Wis. Birth: Guernsey County, Ohio. Date of issue: December 1, 1864.

Citation:

Capture of flag of 2d Mississippi Infantry (C.S.A.)

== See also ==
- List of Medal of Honor recipients for the Battle of Gettysburg
- List of American Civil War Medal of Honor recipients: T–Z
