= West Prairie, Wisconsin =

West Prairie, Wisconsin may refer to the following places in the U.S. state of Wisconsin:

- West Prairie, Trempealeau County, Wisconsin, an unincorporated community
- West Prairie, Vernon County, Wisconsin, an unincorporated community
