= Southern Ontario tornado outbreak of 2005 =

Series of thunderstorms in Southern Ontario in 2005

Southern Ontario Tornado Outbreak of 2005
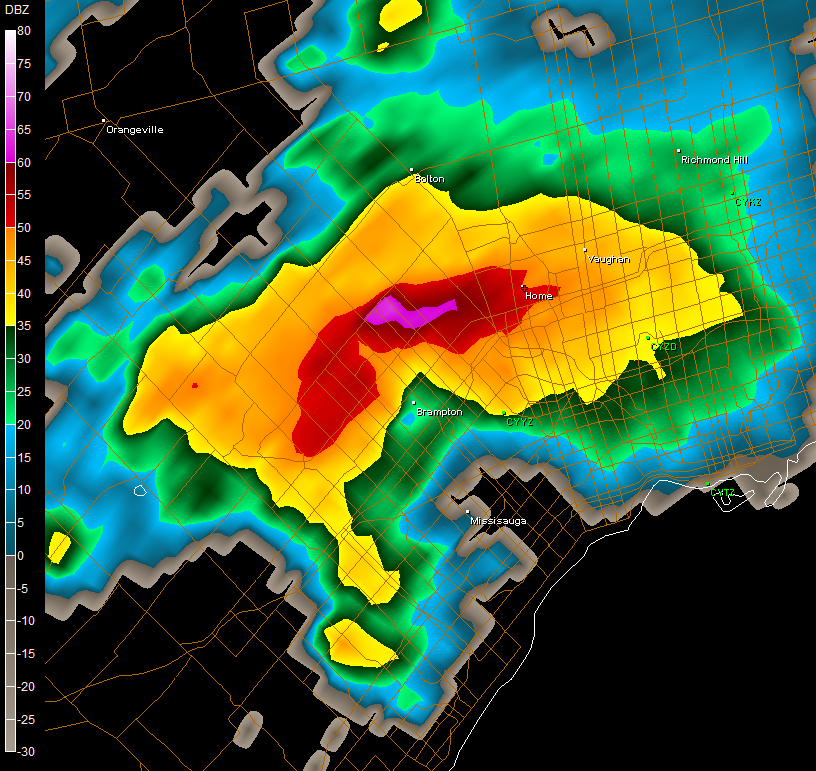
- Supercell thunderstorm hitting Toronto and the surrounding suburbs

Meteorological history
- Duration: August 19, 2005

Tornado outbreak
- Tornadoes: 3 confirmed, 1 unconfirmed
- Max. rating: F2 tornado
- Duration: 3 hours, 10 minutes

Overall effects
- Fatalities: None
- Damage: in excess of $500 million CAD
- Areas affected: Southern Ontario

The Southern Ontario tornado outbreak of 2005 was a series of thunderstorms on the afternoon of August 19, 2005, that spawned tornadoes damaging homes in the Conestoga Lake, Fergus, and Tavistock areas. A tornado was reported within the Toronto city limits, although this was never officially confirmed by the Meteorological Service of Canada. The storms morphed into heavy rain cells when reaching Toronto. The Insurance Bureau of Canada has estimated that insured losses were the highest in the province's history, exceeding 500 million Canadian dollars, two and a half times that of Ontario's losses during the 1998 ice storm and the second largest loss event in Canadian history until another event of torrential rain of July 8, 2013 (1 billion CAD).

== Meteorological events ==
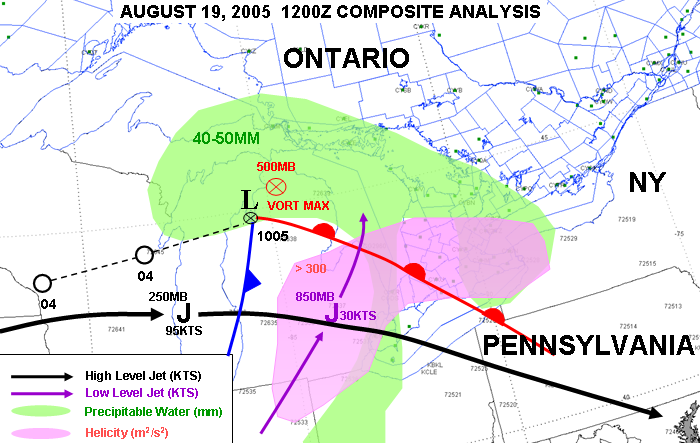
Composite weather map on the morning of August 19, 2005

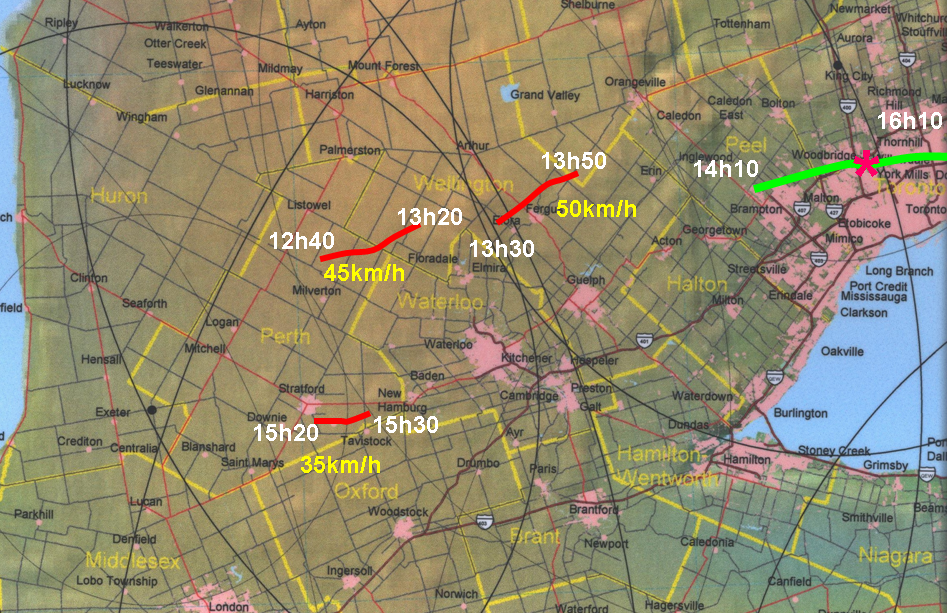
Tornadoes and downpour cells tracks with time shown in local time and their motion speed in yellow

On the early morning of August 19, a low-pressure area was sitting over Northern Michigan with a cold front southwestward. This same system had been causing an outbreak of tornadoes over Wisconsin the day before. As shown in the map to the left, there was up to 50 mm (2.0 in) of precipitable water in the warm air mass invading Southern Ontario with a strong southwesterly low level jet parallel to the cold front and the presence of an upper jet-stream. All of these were very favorable for the development of severe thunderstorms. Furthermore, the wind shear in the lower troposphere was creating a large helicity value conducive to a tornado potential.

With the advancing cold front, two lines of thunderstorms developed. The first one was near Stratford, Ontario (20 km (12 mi) west of Kitchener), and spread as far north as Georgian Bay near Collingwood, Ontario while the second one was following behind near the shores of Lake Huron. They tracked eastward and reached as far as Oshawa during the afternoon. Dozens of storm cells populated the line, two of them developing into tornadic supercells. At their worst, the tornadoes reached the F2 level, with gusts between 180 and 250 km/h (110 and 160 mph). Severe thunderstorm warnings were sent, mentioning the possibility of tornadoes in view of the radar output and the potential analysis.

The main storm, later dubbed the Toronto Supercell, spawned a first tornado tracking through Milverton (43°34′00″N 80°56′00″W) to Conestogo Lake (43°41′10″N 80°43′50″W) (west of Elmira) from 12:40 to 1:20 pm local time. A second twister moved from Salem (43°41′36″N 80°26′49″W) to Lake Belwood (43°46′05″N 80°20′08″W) (north of Guelph), passing just to the north of Fergus 10 minutes later. When the storm came close to the Greater Toronto Area, a tornado warning was issued, but the storm changed its characteristics. It produced winds of well over 100 km/h (62 mph), golf ball sized hail, but mostly heavy rain flooding many parts of the city between 2 and 4 pm.

Finally, another severe storm passing Southeast of Stratford, in the Tavistock area (43°12′45″N 80°50′51″W), gave an F1 tornado with winds between 120 and 150 kilometres per hour (75 and 93 mph) by 3:20 pm.

== Storm's characteristics ==
The Toronto Supercell maintained all the characteristics of a tornado producer as it approached the city. Convective storm detection showed on weather radars a hook echo, a BWER and a strong mesocyclone but the vortex left the ground after the second tornado. Studies were made to try to explain the change in behavior to an extremely high producer of rain. One area of Thornhill, just north of the Toronto City limits recorded 175 millimetres (7 in) of rain in less than one hour.

Toronto is situated by Lake Ontario and a lake breeze often develops during the day. This wind brings cooler air at the surface and causes a marine temperature inversion which could have been enough to keep the rotation aloft. To the west of the city, there is the Niagara Escarpment, reaching 1,500 feet (460 m) above sea level (ASL), while the shores of Lake Ontario are just 250 feet (76 m) ASL. This drop could equally have cut off the rotation from the surface.

The lightning shows that there was a strong peak during the F2 tornadoes, dominated by the positive cloud-to-ground strikes. Studies have shown that this is often the case in tornadic storms. It was followed by a sharp drop and then another peak, but this one dominated by negative lightning during the flooding phase of the storm.

== Impacts ==
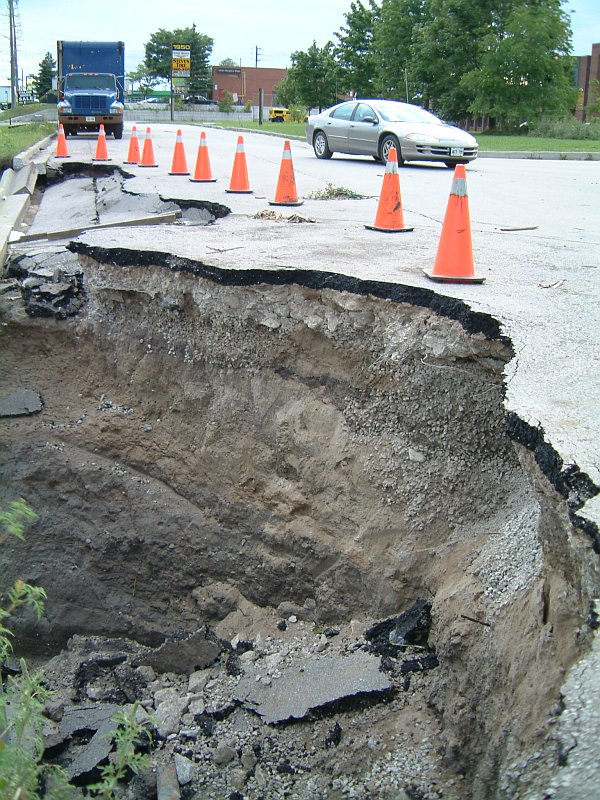
Flood waters washed away a portion of a parking lot near Keele St. and Highway 7 in Vaughan.

The twisters uprooted hundreds of trees, chewed the limbs off of countless others, downed power lines, tossed cars and trucks aside, and ripped into several homes, cottages and barns. In Guelph and Orangeville, 10,000 residents were left without power. No deaths or injuries were reported.

In Toronto, 103 mm (4.1 in) of rain fell in one hour in North York and surrounding area, double the amount left by Hurricane Hazel in 1954 (the heaviest rain from Hazel fell over Etobicoke and the Airport area). At the Meteorological Service of Canada (MSC) Downsview headquarters, 130 mm (5.1 in) of rain fell, 100 mm (3.9 in) of which occurred in less than an hour, a record for any storm in Toronto. A block or two to the north in Thornhill, a weather watcher emptied her rain gauge at 175 mm (6.9 in). Rainfall totals from the storm exceeded 140 mm (5.5 in) in parts in Vaughan. A volunteer storm spotter reported a tornado in the north part of the city but it was not confirmed by Environment Canada.

The rain washed out a portion of Finch Avenue near Sentinel Ave in North York. It overflowed storm drains which caused severe basement flooding to many thousands of homes and two floors of the MSC building. Around Toronto, torrential rains snarled traffic and stranded drivers. Fire services responded to more than 1,000 calls. Marine services personnel rescued four people who fell into the fast-moving currents of the Don River.

== See also ==
- Heat wave of 2006 derecho series – Series of weather events in Southern Ontario and the United States
- Southern Ontario Tornado Outbreak of 2009 – Largest single-day tornado outbreak in Ontario history
- 1985 United States–Canada tornado outbreak – Record-breaking tornado outbreak
