= Esofea, Wisconsin =

- Unincorporated community
- Location within Wisconsin Location within the United States
- Coordinates: 43°37′52″N 90°57′47″W
- Country: United States
- State: Wisconsin
- County: Vernon
- Elevation: 978 ft (298 m)
- Time zone: UTC-6 (Central (CST))
  - Summer (DST): UTC-5 (CDT)
- Area code: 608
- GNIS feature ID: 1564696

Esofea is an unincorporated community in the town of Jefferson in Vernon County, Wisconsin, United States, located along County Road B.

== History ==
In the early 1900s Esofea was a stopping point for travelers on horse going between Viroqua and La Crosse. The community had a creamery, general store, school house, and post office, most of which were destroyed in the early 1990s to make way for road construction along County Road B. The church, Bethany Lutheran, and a park, Rentz Memorial Park (commonly called Esofea Park), still exist. Two main roads run through the community, County Road B and Park Road.

A tornado landed near Esofea on August 18, 2005 at the time of The that month's tornado outbreak.

== Gallery ==
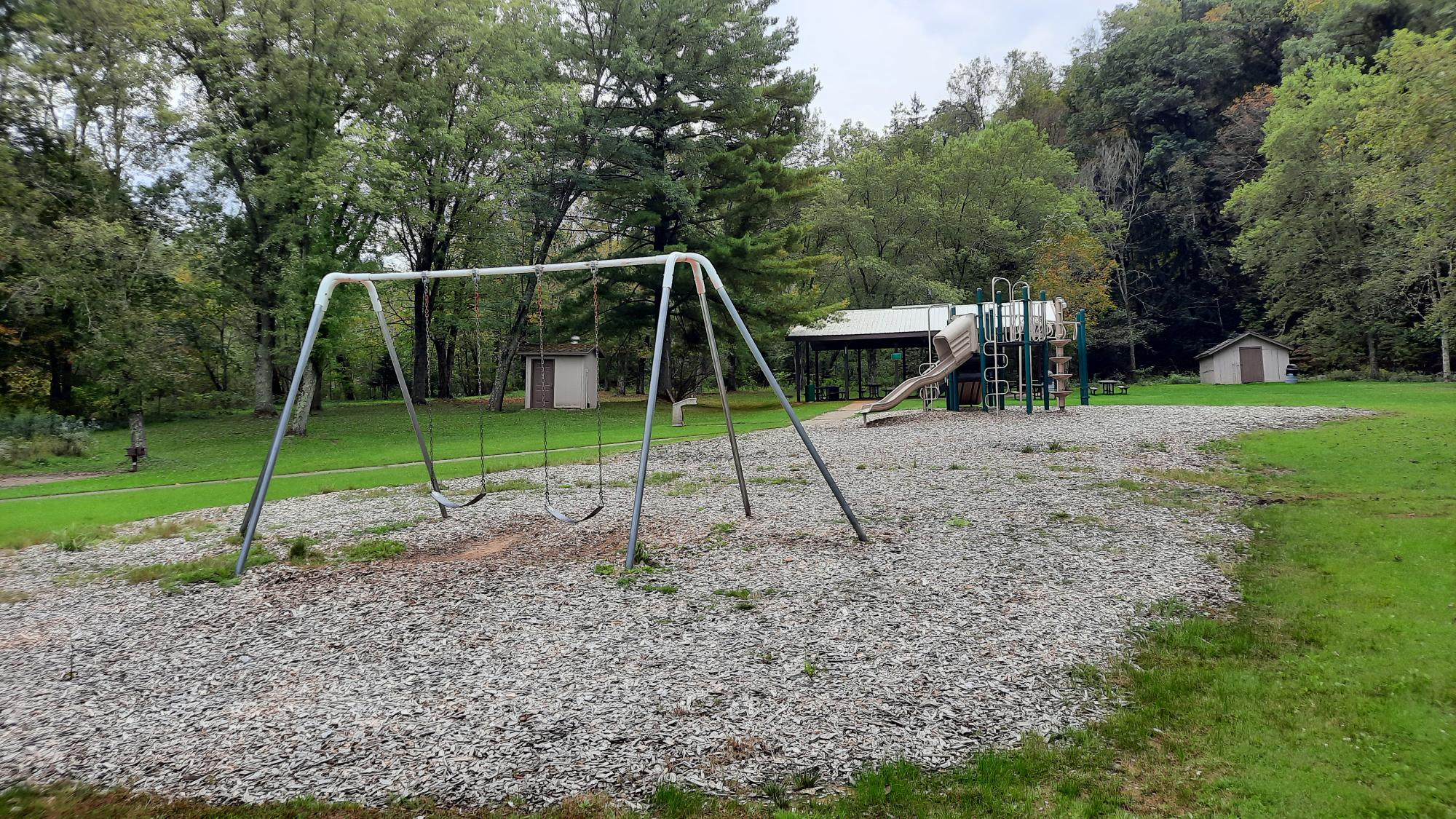
Esofea playground 2024Sept21 1:12pm

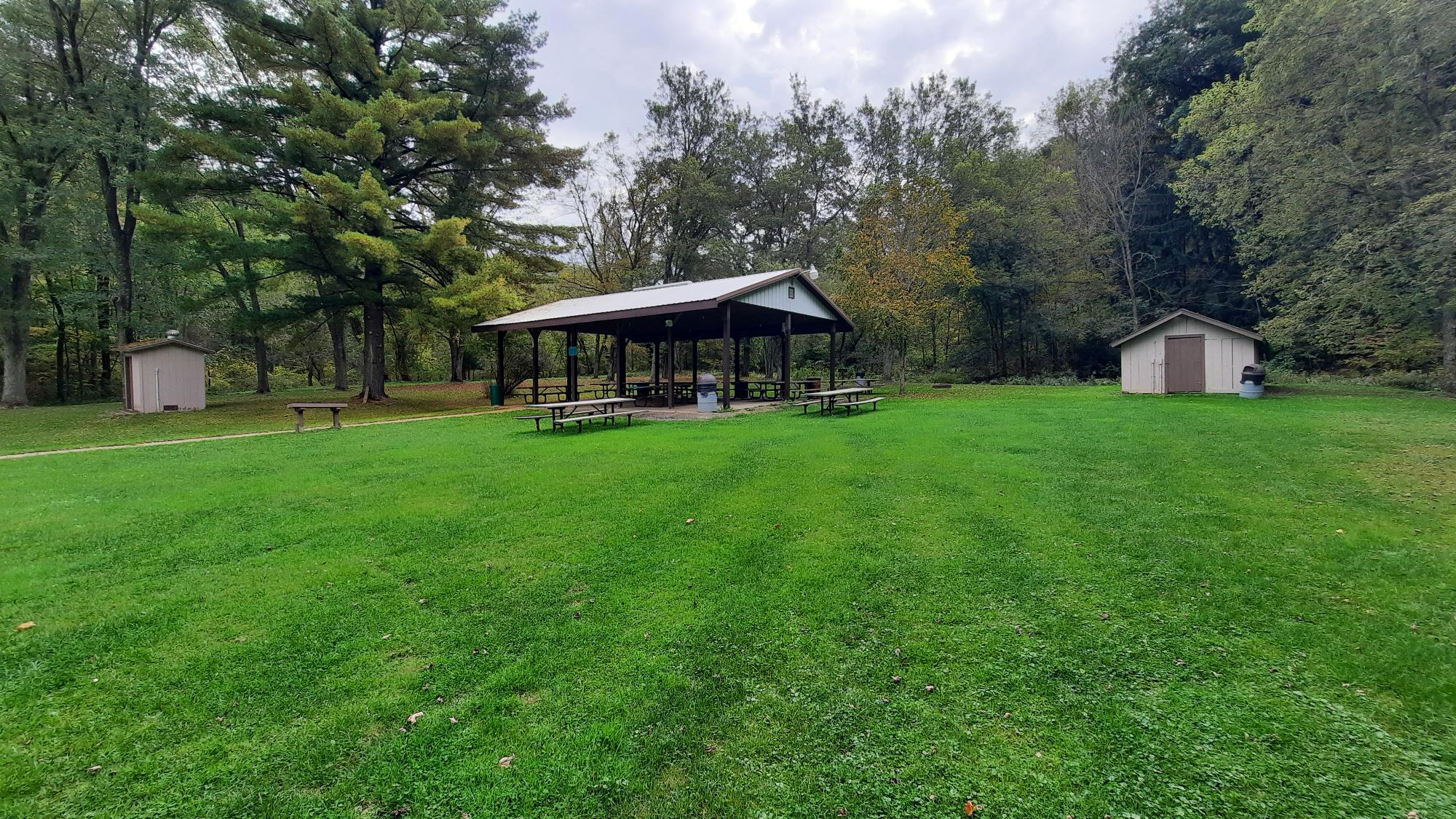
Esofea picnic shelter 2024Sept21 1:14pm

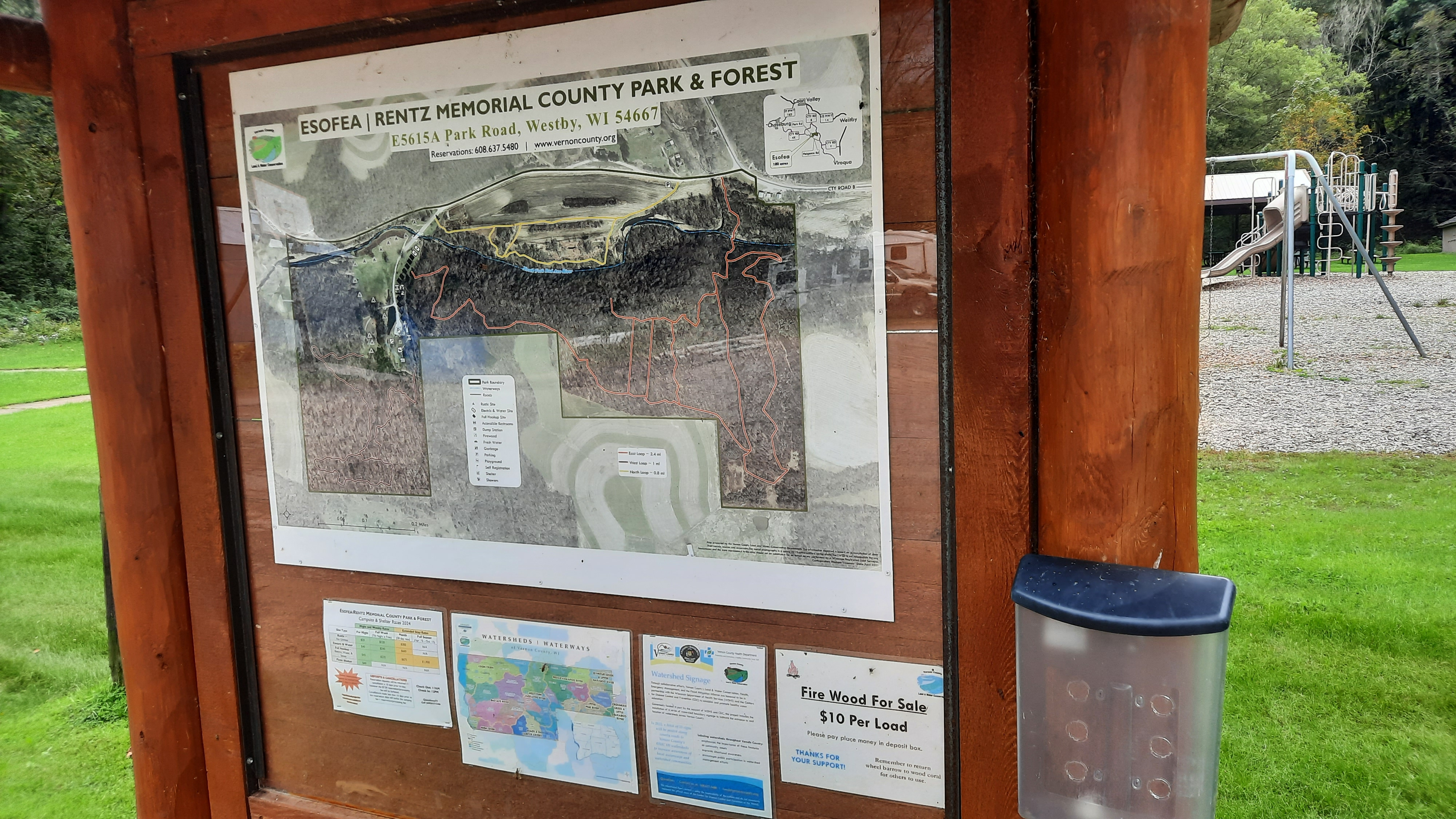
Esofea Park Information Board 2024Sept21 1:12pm
