= Bergen, Vernon County, Wisconsin =

Bergen, Wisconsin
- Town
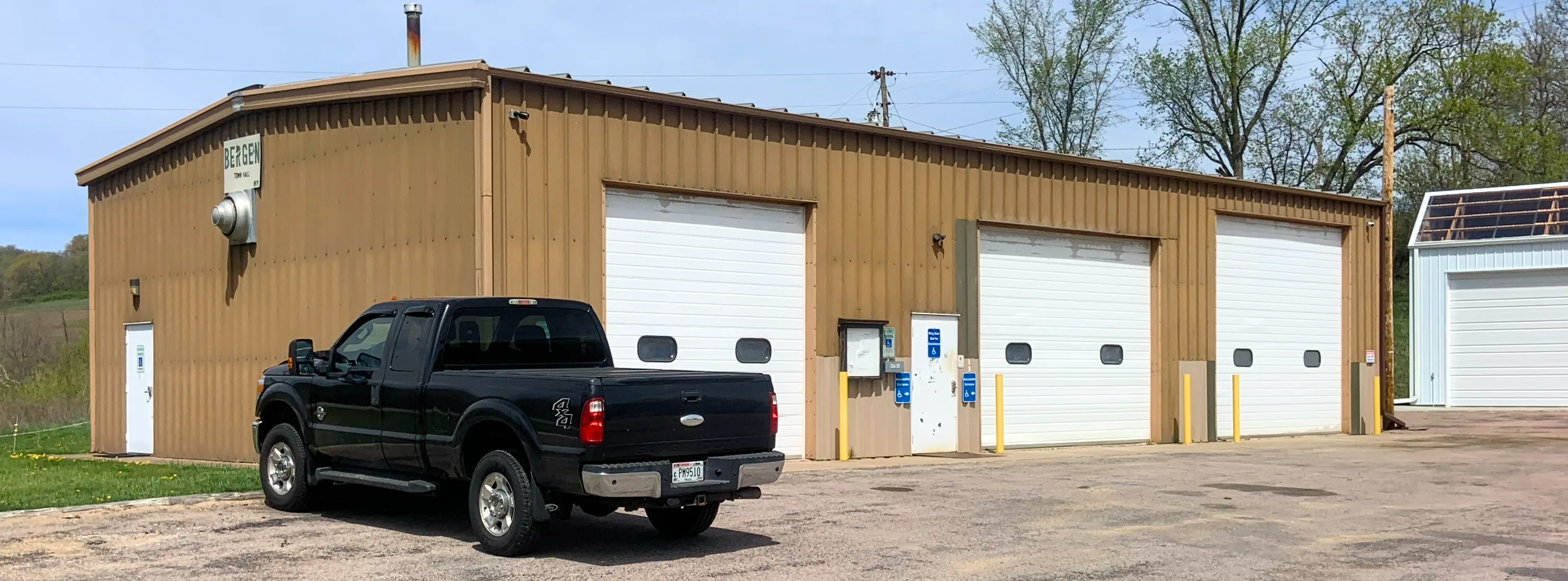
- Bergen Town Hall

- Location in Vernon County and the state of Wisconsin.
- Coordinates: 43°40′24″N 91°11′52″W
- Country: United States
- State: Wisconsin
- County: Vernon

Area
  - Total: 52.8 sq mi (136.7 km^{2})
  - Land: 34.2 sq mi (88.6 km^{2})
  - Water: 18.6 sq mi (48.1 km^{2})
- Elevation: 643 ft (196 m)

Population (2020)
  - Total: 1,365
  - Density: 39/sq mi (14.9/km^{2})
- Time zone: UTC-6 (Central (CST))
  - Summer (DST): UTC-5 (CDT)
- Area code: 608
- FIPS code: 55-06900
- GNIS feature ID: 1582798

Bergen (/ˈbɜːrɡən/ BUR-ghən) is a town in Vernon County, Wisconsin, United States. The population was 1,365 at the 2020 census. The unincorporated community of Pleasant Valley is located in the town.

== Geography ==
According to the United States Census Bureau, the town has a total area of 52.8 square miles (136.7 km^{2}), of which 34.2 square miles (88.6 km^{2}) is land and 18.6 square miles (48.1 km^{2}) (35.18%) is water.

== Demographics ==
As of the census of 2000, there were 1,317 people, 491 households, and 399 families residing in the town. The population density was 38.5 people per square mile (14.9/km^{2}). There were 535 housing units at an average density of 15.6 per square mile (6.0/km^{2}). The racial makeup of the town was 98.63% White, 0.08% Native American, 0.46% Asian, 0.08% from other races, and 0.76% from two or more races. Hispanic or Latino of any race were 0.38% of the population.

There were 491 households, out of which 34.8% had children under the age of 18 living with them, 72.9% were married couples living together, 4.5% had a female householder with no husband present, and 18.7% were non-families. 16.5% of all households were made up of individuals, and 5.3% had someone living alone who was 65 years of age or older. The average household size was 2.68 and the average family size was 3.01.

In the town, the population was spread out, with 25.7% under the age of 18, 6.5% from 18 to 24, 28.2% from 25 to 44, 28.1% from 45 to 64, and 11.5% who were 65 years of age or older. The median age was 40 years. For every 100 females, there were 108.7 males. For every 100 females age 18 and over, there were 106.3 males.

The median income for a household in the town was $51,779, and the median income for a family was $57,054. Males had a median income of $35,417 versus $24,375 for females. The per capita income for the town was $21,172. About 3.0% of families and 3.8% of the population were below the poverty line, including 6.1% of those under age 18 and 3.9% of those age 65 or over.
