= Red Mound, Wisconsin =

- Unincorporated community
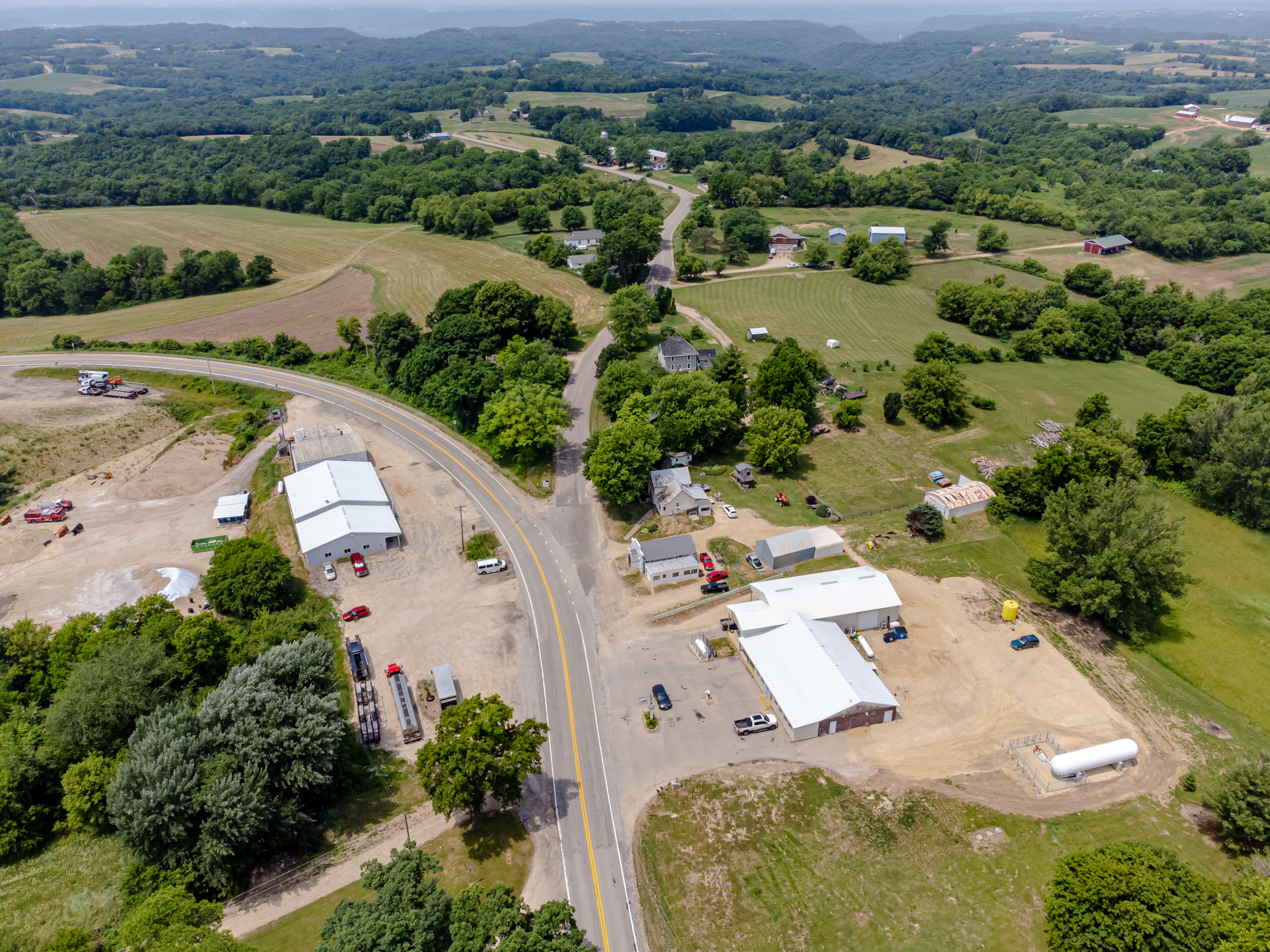

- Location within Wisconsin Location within the United States
- Coordinates: 43°28′21″N 91°08′41″W
- Country: United States
- State: Wisconsin
- County: Vernon
- Elevation: 1,312 ft (400 m)
- Time zone: UTC-6 (Central (CST))
  - Summer (DST): UTC-5 (CDT)
- Area code: 608
- GNIS feature ID: 1577788

Red Mound is an unincorporated community in the Town of Wheatland, Vernon County, Wisconsin, United States.

== History ==
The post office was established in Red Mound on March 15, 1872. L.J. Miller was the first postmaster.
