= Kickapoo, Wisconsin =

- Town
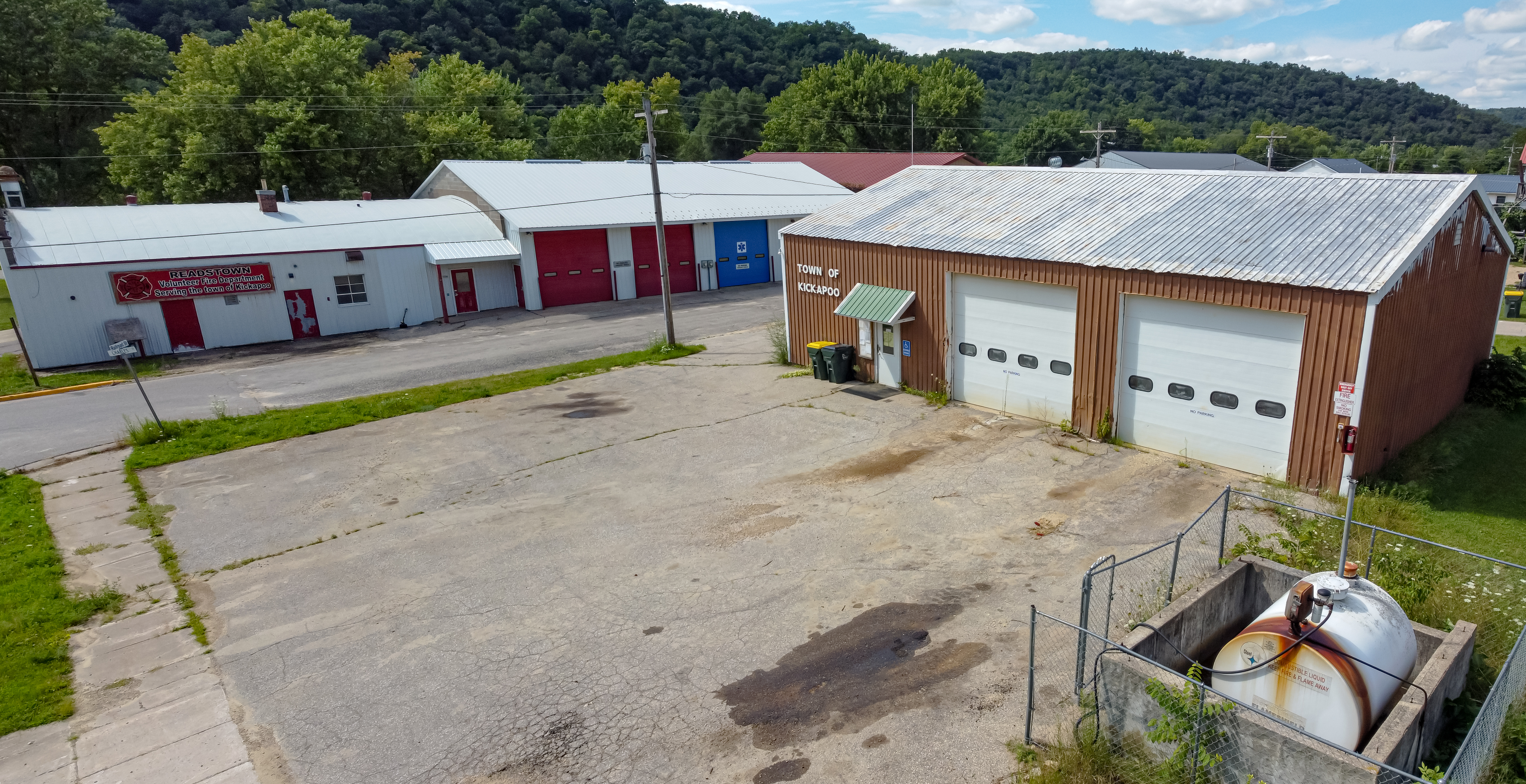
- Town hall in Readstown

- Location in Vernon County and the state of Wisconsin
- Coordinates: 43°27′44″N 90°45′17″W
- Country: United States
- State: Wisconsin
- County: Vernon

Area
  - Total: 37.9 sq mi (98.1 km^{2})
  - Land: 37.9 sq mi (98.1 km^{2})
  - Water: 0.039 sq mi (0.1 km^{2})
- Elevation: 735 ft (224 m)

Population (2020)
  - Total: 722
  - Density: 19.1/sq mi (7.36/km^{2})
- Time zone: UTC-6 (Central (CST))
  - Summer (DST): UTC-5 (CDT)
- Area code: 608
- FIPS code: 55-39475
- GNIS feature ID: 1583477

Kickapoo is a town in Vernon County, Wisconsin, United States. The population was 722 at the 2020 census. The unincorporated communities of Kickapoo Center and Sugar Grove are located in the town.

== Geography ==
According to the United States Census Bureau, the town has a total area of 37.9 square miles (98.1 km^{2}), of which 37.9 square miles (98.1 km^{2}) is land and 0.04 square mile (0.1 km^{2}) (0.08%) is water.

== Demographics ==
At the 2000 census there were 566 people, 194 households, and 156 families in the town. The population density was 14.9 people per square mile (5.8/km^{2}). There were 251 housing units at an average density of 6.6 per square mile (2.6/km^{2}). The racial makeup of the town was 99.65% White, 0.18% Native American, and 0.18% from two or more races. Hispanic or Latino people of any race were 0.35%.

Of the 194 households 31.4% had children under the age of 18 living with them, 73.2% were married couples living together, 4.1% had a female householder with no husband present, and 19.1% were non-families. 14.9% of households were one person and 4.6% were one person aged 65 or older. The average household size was 2.92 and the average family size was 3.28.

The age distribution was 30.4% under the age of 18, 4.9% from 18 to 24, 23.9% from 25 to 44, 27.4% from 45 to 64, and 13.4% 65 or older. The median age was 39 years. For every 100 females, there were 111.2 males. For every 100 females age 18 and over, there were 108.5 males.

The median household income was $36,023/year, and the median family income was $38,125/year. Males had a median income of $23,929/year versus $19,453/year for females. The per capita income for the town was $15,543/year. About 5.7% of families and 7.2% of the population were below the poverty line, including 6.6% of those under age 18 and 2.8% of those age 65 or over.

== See also ==
- Kickapoo High School
