= Kickapoo Center, Wisconsin =

- Unincorporated community
- Location within Wisconsin Location within the United States
- Coordinates: 43°28′18″N 90°41′56″W
- Country: United States
- State: Wisconsin
- County: Vernon
- Elevation: 791 ft (241 m)
- Time zone: UTC-6 (Central (CST))
  - Summer (DST): UTC-5 (CDT)
- Area code: 608
- GNIS feature ID: 1567454

Kickapoo Center is an unincorporated community located in the town of Kickapoo, Vernon County, Wisconsin, United States. Kickapoo Center is located on Wisconsin Highway 131 near the Kickapoo River, 3 miles (4.8 km) south-southwest of Viola.

== History ==
The first post office opened in Kickapoo in 1853; Robert Wilson was the first postmaster. Kickapoo was planned in 1857 by Joseph Wood on land belonging to Wilson, and the first schoolhouse was built of logs in the same year. However, it soon burnt down. Another schoolhouse was built on the same spot and still stands at a nearby location and is used as a residence. It was used as a schoolhouse until the 1960s. The early community had a store and a hotel, the latter of which closed in 1873; a sawmill opened across the river from Kickapoo Center in 1883. The community was named for the Kickapoo people. Now, the Kickapoo River has reclaimed all of the streets and buildings and the only remnant of the once thriving town is a depression that once was the basement of the store owned by Knox and St John.
