= Avalanche, Wisconsin =

- Unincorporated community
- Location within Wisconsin Location within the United States
- Coordinates: 43°36′08″N 90°46′49″W
- Country: United States
- State: Wisconsin
- County: Vernon
- Elevation: 853 ft (260 m)
- Time zone: UTC-6 (Central (CST))
  - Summer (DST): UTC-5 (CDT)
- Area code: 608
- GNIS feature ID: 1561029

Avalanche is an unincorporated community in the town of Webster, Vernon County, Wisconsin, United States. The community took its name from a geographic feature east of the village that looked like an avalanche.

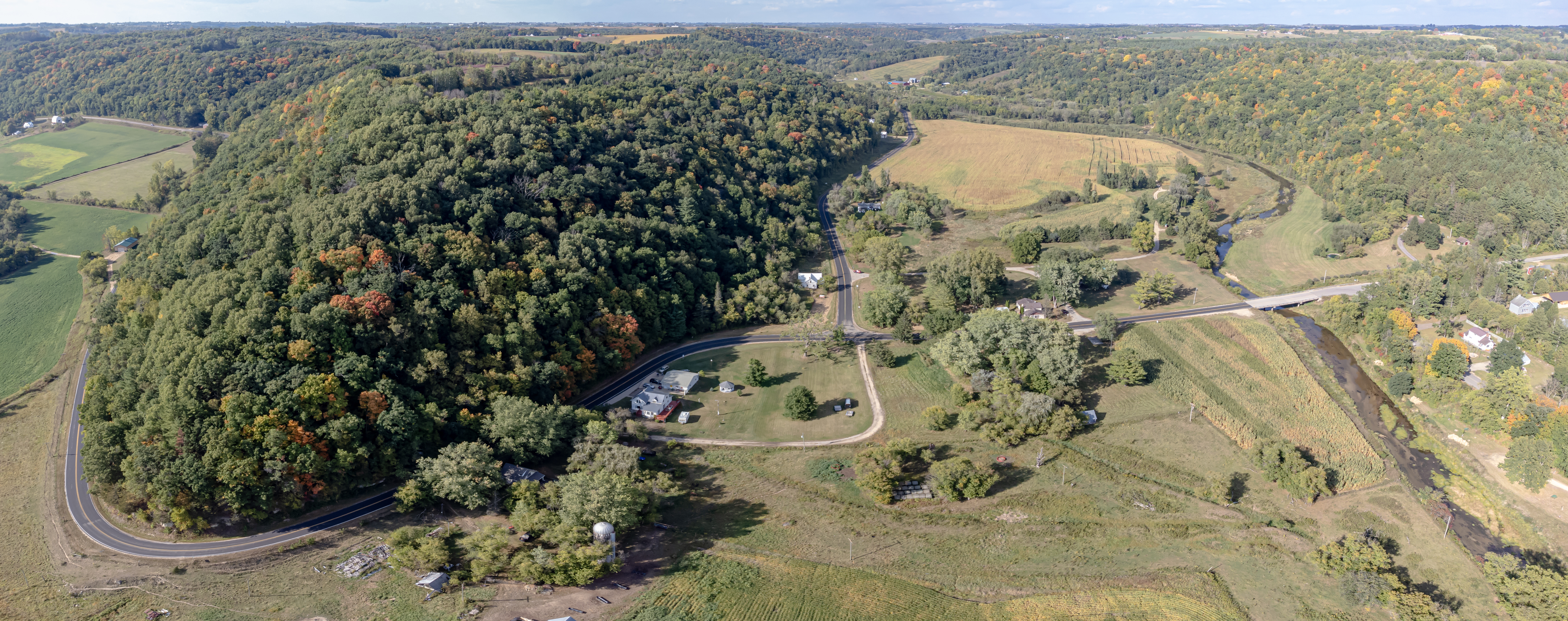
Avalanche, Wisconsin
