= Retreat, Wisconsin =

- Unincorporated community
- Location within Wisconsin Location within the United States
- Coordinates: 43°26′44″N 91°04′50″W
- Country: United States
- State: Wisconsin
- County: Vernon
- Elevation: 1,280 ft (390 m)
- Time zone: UTC-6 (Central (CST))
  - Summer (DST): UTC-5 (CDT)
- Area code: 608
- GNIS feature ID: 1572222

Retreat is an unincorporated community in Vernon County, Wisconsin, United States, in the town of Sterling.

== Notable people ==
- Francis A. Wallar; awarded the Medal of Honor for his actions during the Battle of Gettysburg
