= Wheatland, Vernon County, Wisconsin =

Town in Vernon County, Wisconsin, United States

Wheatland
- Town
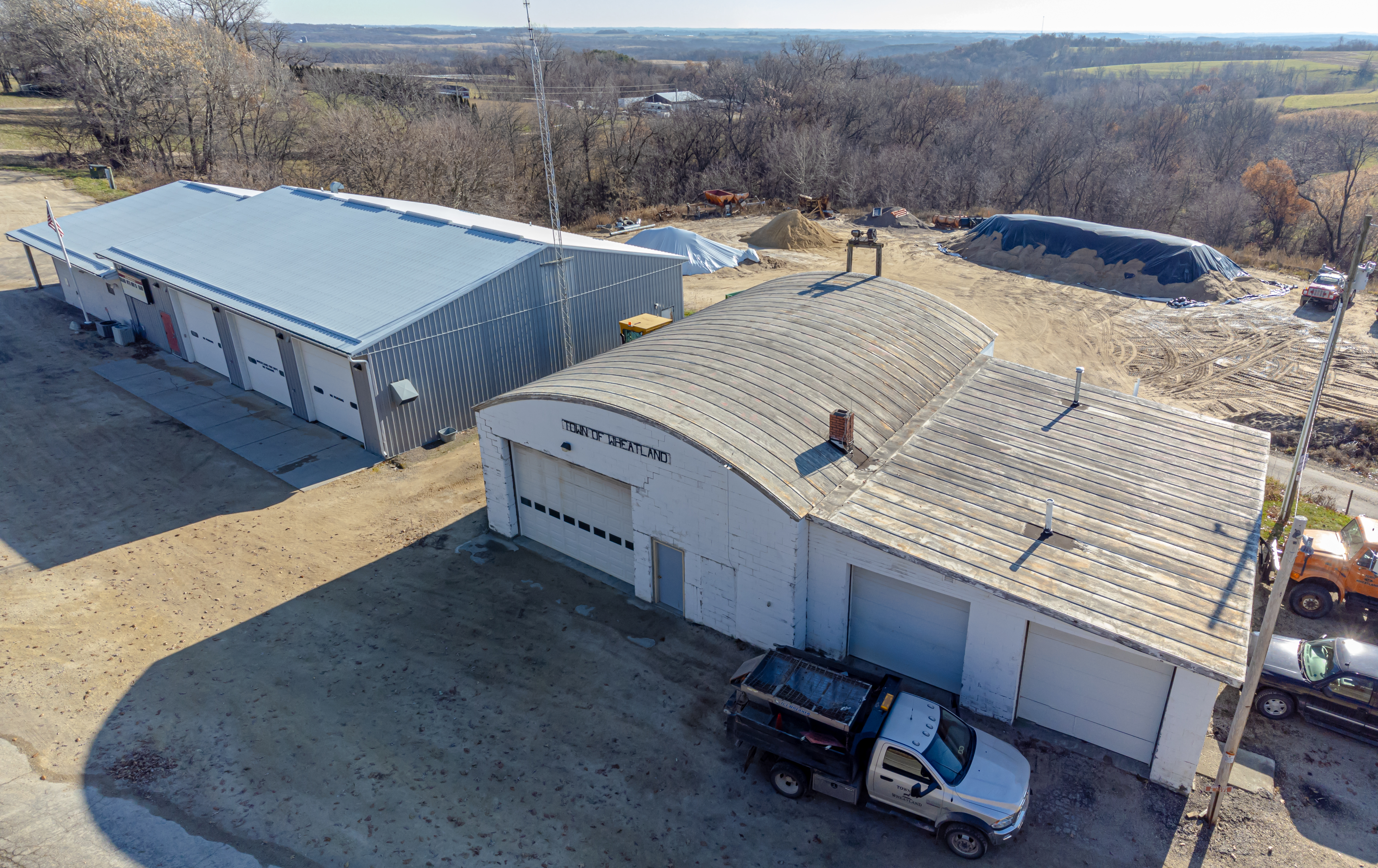
- Town of Wheatland town hall

- Location in Vernon County and the state of Wisconsin.
- Coordinates: 43°26′47″N 91°10′57″W
- Country: United States
- State: Wisconsin
- County: Vernon

Area
  - Total: 27.6 sq mi (71.5 km^{2})
  - Land: 26.5 sq mi (68.7 km^{2})
  - Water: 1.1 sq mi (2.9 km^{2})
- Elevation: 1,155 ft (352 m)

Population (2020)
  - Total: 588
  - Density: 22.2/sq mi (8.56/km^{2})
- Time zone: UTC-6 (Central (CST))
  - Summer (DST): UTC-5 (CDT)
- Area code: 608
- FIPS code: 55-86525
- GNIS feature ID: 1584422
- Website: https://www.town-of-wheatland.com/

Wheatland is a town in Vernon County, Wisconsin, United States. The population was 588 at the 2020 census. The unincorporated communities of Red Mound and Victory are located in Wheatland.

== Geography ==
According to the United States Census Bureau, the town has a total area of 27.6 square miles (71.5 km^{2}), of which 26.5 square miles (68.7 km^{2}) is land and 1.1 square miles (2.8 km^{2}) (3.98%) is water.

== Demographics ==
At the 2000 census there were 533 people in 236 households, including 160 families, in the town. The population density was 20.1 people per square mile (7.8/km^{2}). There were 360 housing units at an average density of 13.6 per square mile (5.2/km^{2}). The racial makeup of the town was 98.31% White, 0.19% Native American, 0.19% Asian, 0.56% from other races, and 0.75% from two or more races. Hispanic or Latino of any race were 1.31%.

Of the 236 households 20.8% had children under the age of 18 living with them, 58.1% were married couples living together, 6.4% had a female householder with no husband present, and 31.8% were non-families. 27.1% of households were one person and 12.3% were one person aged 65 or older. The average household size was 2.26 and the average family size was 2.74.

The age distribution was 19.9% under the age of 18, 4.3% from 18 to 24, 19.7% from 25 to 44, 37.3% from 45 to 64, and 18.8% 65 or older. The median age was 47 years. For every 100 females, there were 105.0 males. For every 100 females age 18 and over, there were 103.3 males.

The median household income was $35,500 and the median family income was $40,000. Males had a median income of $30,583 versus $17,708 for females. The per capita income for the town was $19,247. About 4.9% of families and 7.9% of the population were below the poverty line, including 16.3% of those under age 18 and 7.5% of those age 65 or over.

== Gallery ==
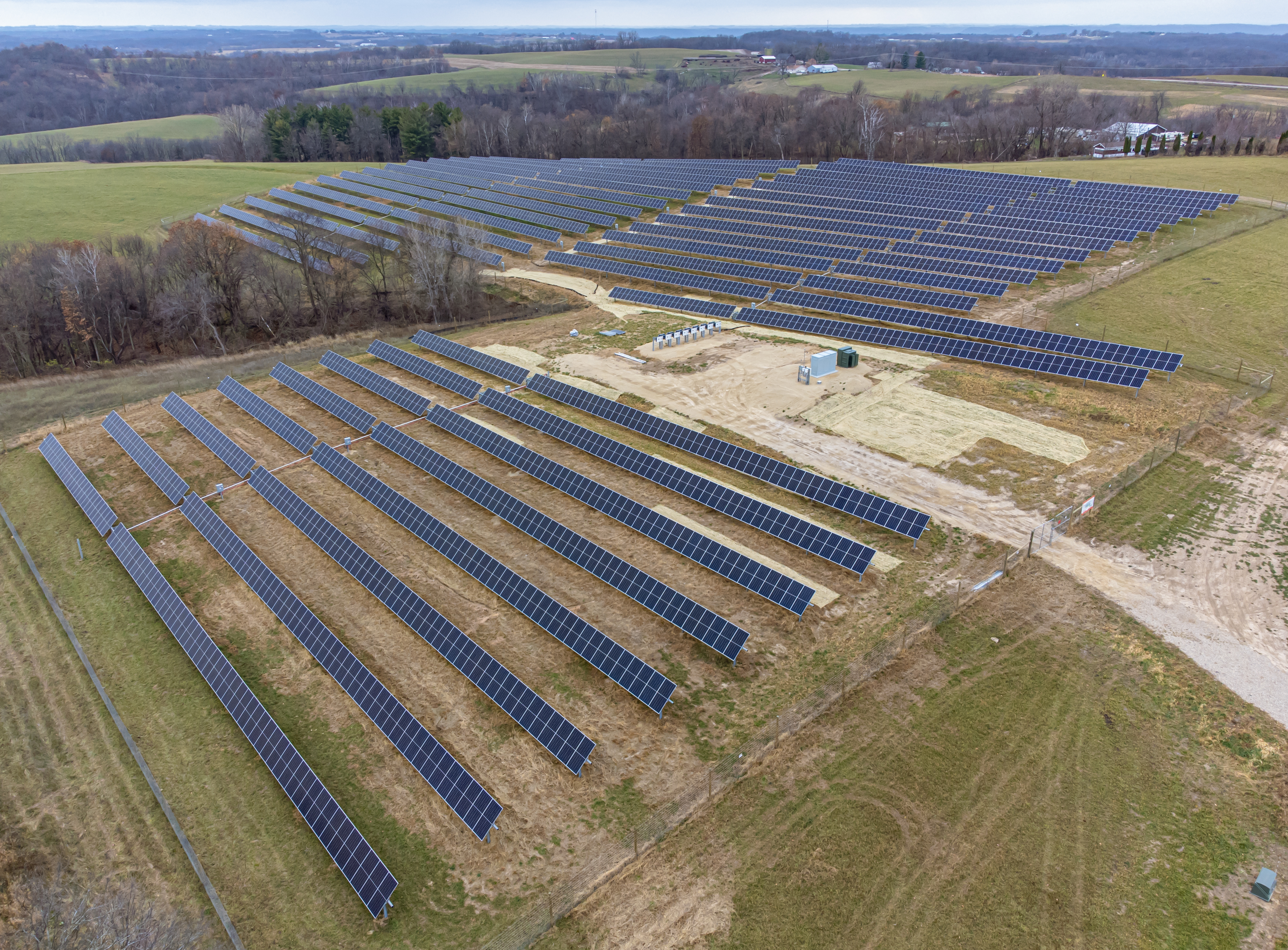
Solar farm in the town of Wheatland, Wisconsin
