= Sterling, Vernon County, Wisconsin =

Sterling, Wisconsin
- Town
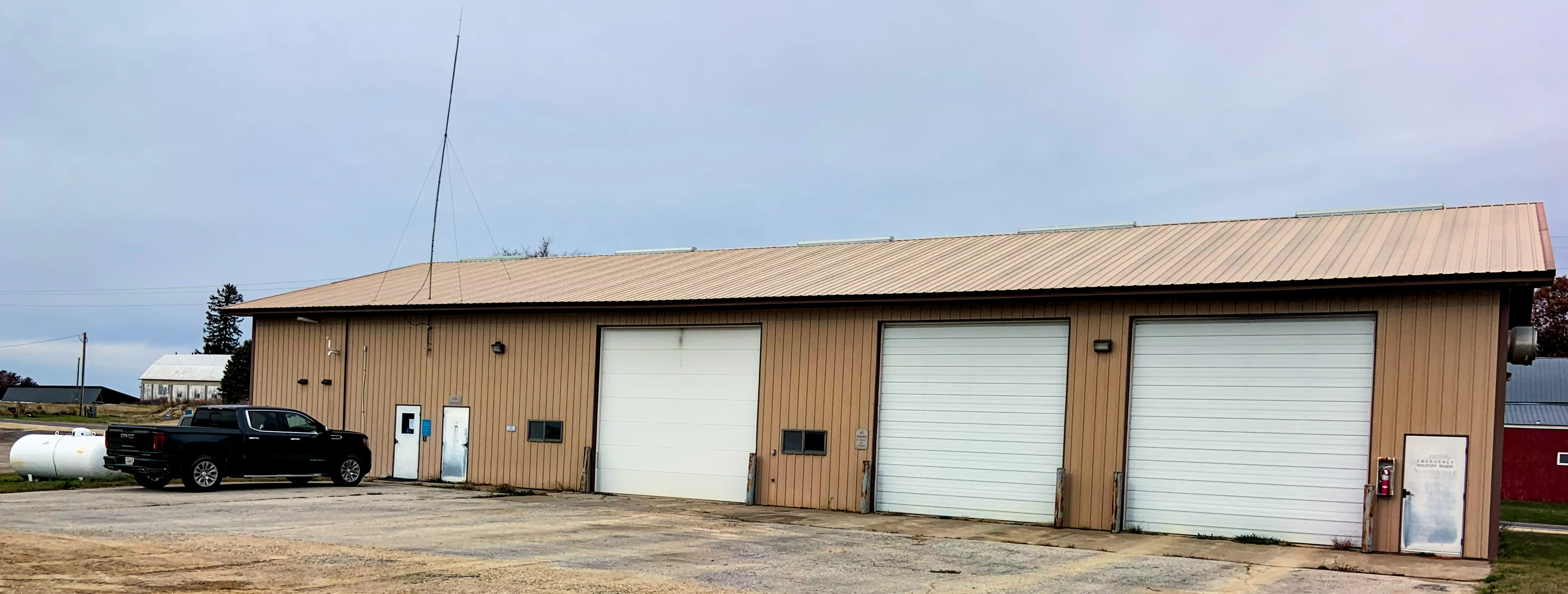
- Town hall

- Location in Vernon County and the state of Wisconsin.
- Coordinates: 43°29′0″N 91°2′29″W
- Country: United States
- State: Wisconsin
- County: Vernon

Area
  - Total: 45.4 sq mi (117.7 km^{2})
  - Land: 45.4 sq mi (117.7 km^{2})
  - Water: 0 sq mi (0.0 km^{2})
- Elevation: 1,122 ft (342 m)

Population (2020)
  - Total: 550
  - Density: 12/sq mi (4.7/km^{2})
- Time zone: UTC-6 (Central (CST))
  - Summer (DST): UTC-5 (CDT)
- Area code: 608
- FIPS code: 55-77075
- GNIS feature ID: 1584219

Sterling is a town in Vernon County, Wisconsin, United States. The population was 550 at the 2020 census. The unincorporated communities of Purdy, Retreat, and West Prairie are located in the town.

== Geography ==
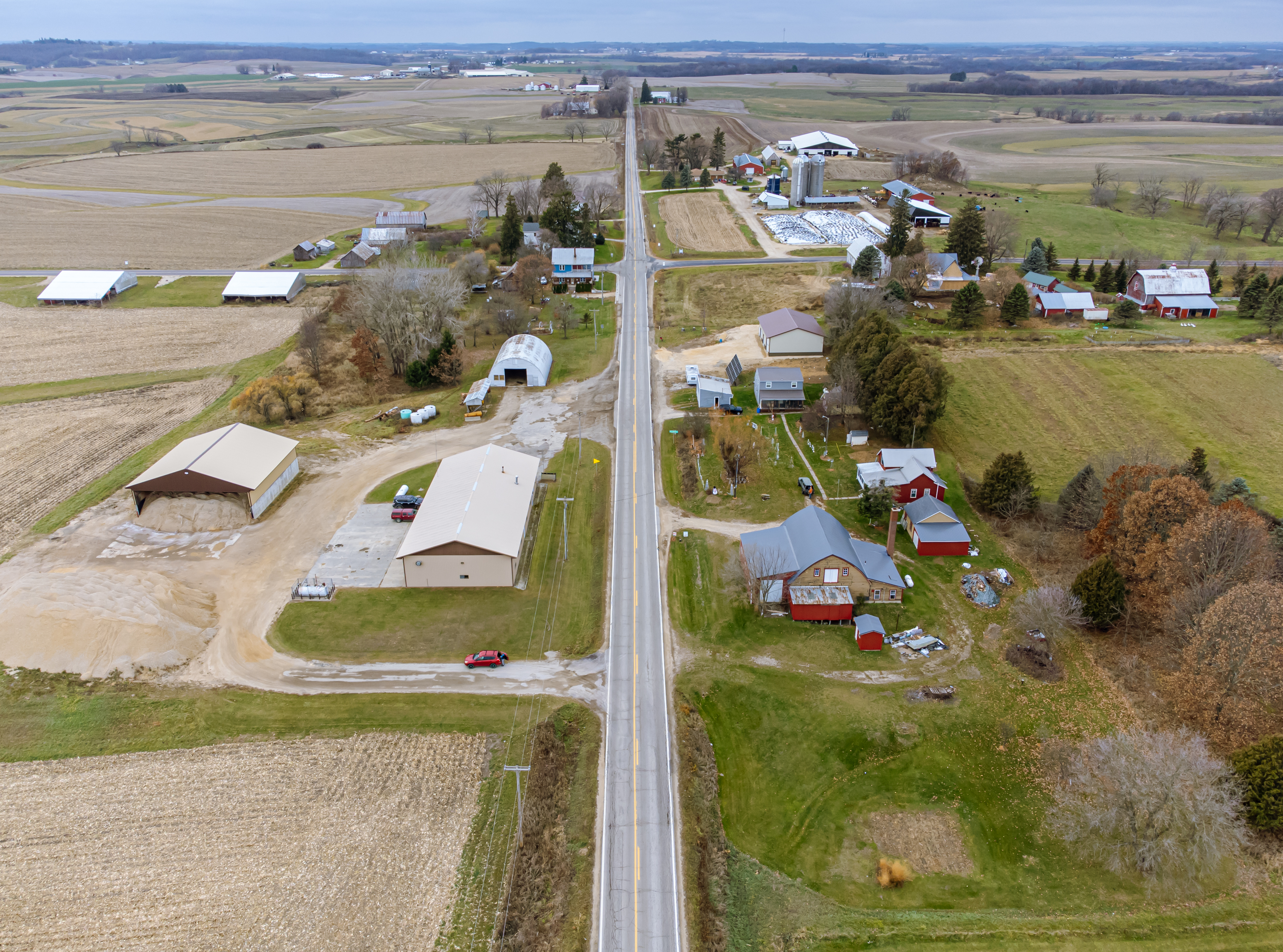
Sterling town hall area On Wis 82

According to the United States Census Bureau, the town has a total area of 45.5 square miles (117.7 km^{2}), all land.

== Demographics ==
As of the census of 2000, there were 713 people, 234 households, and 179 families residing in the town. The population density was 15.7 people per square mile (6.1/km^{2}). There were 278 housing units at an average density of 6.1 per square mile (2.4/km^{2}). The racial makeup of the town was 99.44% White, 0.14% African American, 0.14% Asian, and 0.28% from two or more races.

There were 234 households, out of which 40.2% had children under the age of 18 living with them, 67.9% were married couples living together, 2.6% had a female householder with no husband present, and 23.5% were non-families. 20.9% of all households were made up of individuals, and 9.4% had someone living alone who was 65 years of age or older. The average household size was 3.00 and the average family size was 3.54.

In the town, the population was spread out, with 35.2% under the age of 18, 6.0% from 18 to 24, 24.5% from 25 to 44, 22.6% from 45 to 64, and 11.6% who were 65 years of age or older. The median age was 35 years. For every 100 females, there were 110.9 males. For every 100 females age 18 and over, there were 108.1 males.

The median income for a household in the town was $28,125, and the median income for a family was $31,563. Males had a median income of $23,958 versus $19,583 for females. The per capita income for the town was $13,402. About 14.5% of families and 24.2% of the population were below the poverty line, including 33.2% of those under age 18 and 27.9% of those age 65 or over.

== Notable people ==
- Robert A. Nixon, Wisconsin State Representative and lawyer, was born in the town
