= Liberty, Vernon County, Wisconsin =

Liberty, Wisconsin
- Town
- Location in Vernon County and the state of Wisconsin.
- Coordinates: 43°31′11″N 90°44′52″W
- Country: United States
- State: Wisconsin
- County: Vernon

Area
  - Total: 23.1 sq mi (59.7 km^{2})
  - Land: 23.1 sq mi (59.7 km^{2})
  - Water: 0 sq mi (0.0 km^{2})
- Elevation: 778 ft (237 m)

Population (2020)
  - Total: 341
  - Density: 7.3/sq mi (2.8/km^{2})
- Time zone: UTC-6 (Central (CST))
  - Summer (DST): UTC-5 (CDT)
- Area code: 608
- FIPS code: 55-43900
- GNIS feature ID: 1583553
- Website: https://townoflibertywi.us/

Liberty is a town in Vernon County, Wisconsin, United States. The population was 341 at the 2020 census. The unincorporated communities of Liberty and Ross are located in the town.

== Geography ==
According to the United States Census Bureau, the town has a total area of 23.1 square miles (59.7 km^{2}), of which 23.0 square miles (59.7 km^{2}) is land and 0.04% is water.

== Demographics ==
As of the census of 2000, there were 167 people, 73 households, and 52 families residing in the town. The population density was 7.2 people per square mile (2.8/km^{2}). There were 123 housing units at an average density of 5.3 per square mile (2.1/km^{2}). The racial makeup of the town was 100.00% White. Hispanic or Latino of any race were 0.60% of the population.

There were 73 households, out of which 27.4% had children under the age of 18 living with them, 61.6% were married couples living together, 6.8% had a female householder with no husband present, and 27.4% were non-families. 23.3% of all households were made up of individuals, and 12.3% had someone living alone who was 65 years of age or older. The average household size was 2.29 and the average family size was 2.68.

In the town, the population was spread out, with 21.0% under the age of 18, 3.0% from 18 to 24, 27.5% from 25 to 44, 32.3% from 45 to 64, and 16.2% who were 65 years of age or older. The median age was 44 years. For every 100 females, there were 98.8 males. For every 100 females age 18 and over, there were 103.1 males.

The median income for a household in the town was $24,688, and the median income for a family was $27,500. Males had a median income of $21,250 versus $22,500 for females. The per capita income for the town was $13,986. About 11.1% of families and 14.1% of the population were below the poverty line, including none of those under the age of eighteen and 26.7% of those 65 or over.
