= Webster, Vernon County, Wisconsin =

Town in Vernon County, Wisconsin

Webster, Wisconsin
- Town
- Town of Webster
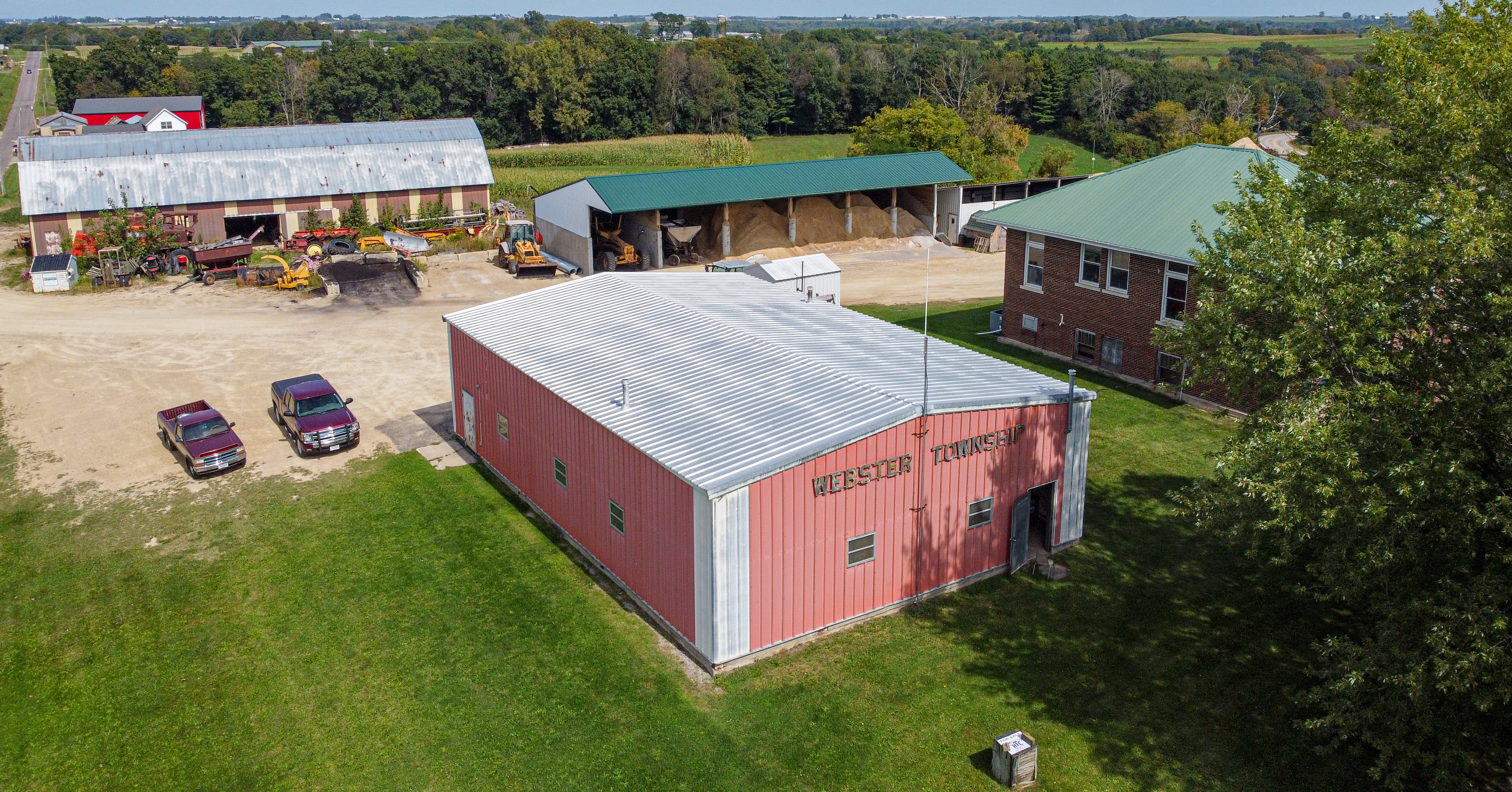
- Webster Town Hall

- Location within Vernon County, Wisconsin
- Coordinates: 43°37′55″N 90°42′38″W
- Country: United States
- State: Wisconsin
- County: Vernon

Area
  - Total: 35.32 sq mi (91.5 km^{2})
  - Land: 35.27 sq mi (91.3 km^{2})
  - Water: 0.05 sq mi (0.13 km^{2})

Population (2020)
  - Total: 821
  - Density: 23.3/sq mi (8.99/km^{2})
- Time zone: UTC-6 (Central (CST))
  - Summer (DST): UTC-5 (CDT)
- Area code(s): 608 and 353
- GNIS feature ID: 1584392
- Website: https://tn.webster.wi.gov/

Webster is a town in Vernon County, Wisconsin, United States. The population was 821 at the 2020 census. The unincorporated community of Avalanche is located in the town. The unincorporated community of Bloomingdale is also located partially within the town.

== History ==
The town was founded on April 7, 1856, and named after American statesman Daniel Webster.

== Geography ==
According to the United States Census Bureau, the town has a total area of 35.4 square miles (91.7 km^{2}), of which 35.4 square miles (91.7 km^{2}) is land and 0.03% is water.

== Demographics ==
As of the census of 2000, there were 676 people, 217 households, and 177 families residing in the town. The population density was 19.1 people per square mile (7.4/km^{2}). There were 293 housing units at an average density of 8.3 per square mile (3.2/km^{2}). The racial makeup of the town was 99.56% White, 0.30% African American, and 0.15% from two or more races. Hispanic or Latino of any race were 0.15% of the population.

There were 217 households, out of which 45.6% had children under the age of 18 living with them, 68.7% were married couples living together, 7.8% had a female householder with no husband present, and 18.4% were non-families. 15.7% of all households were made up of individuals, and 6.9% had someone living alone who was 65 years of age or older. The average household size was 3.12 and the average family size was 3.42.

In the town, the population was spread out, with 35.8% under the age of 18, 6.7% from 18 to 24, 24.6% from 25 to 44, 22.8% from 45 to 64, and 10.2% who were 65 years of age or older. The median age was 33 years. For every 100 females, there were 105.5 males. For every 100 females age 18 and over, there were 105.7 males.

The median income for a household in the town was $32,344, and the median income for a family was $30,938. Males had a median income of $25,278 versus $20,625 for females. The per capita income for the town was $12,031. About 19.0% of families and 26.6% of the population were below the poverty line, including 37.6% of those under age 18 and 8.1% of those age 65 or over.
