= Vernon County, Wisconsin =

County in Wisconsin, United States

- County
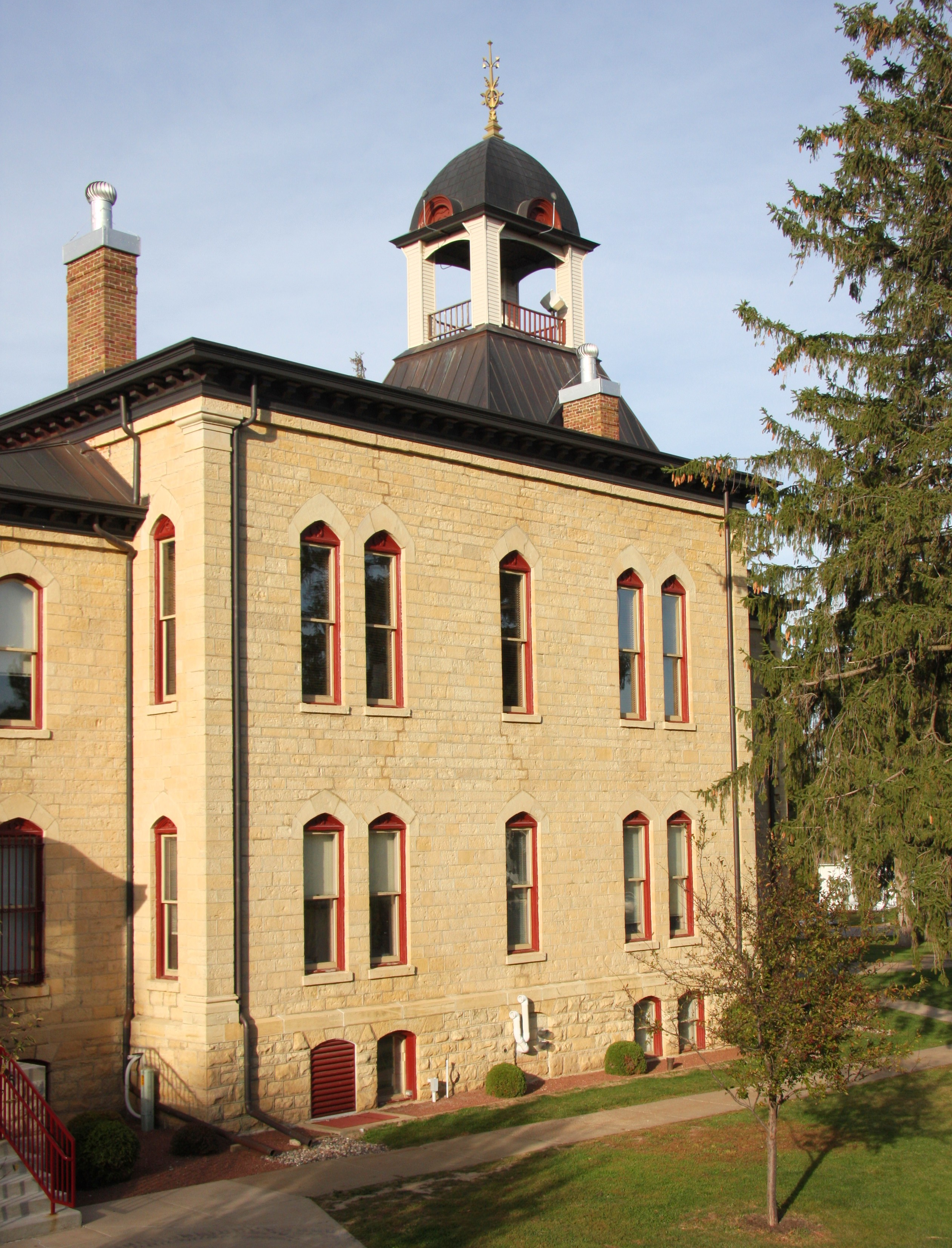
- Vernon County Courthouse in October 2015

- Location within the U.S. state of Wisconsin
- Coordinates: 43°35′N 90°50′W
- Country: United States
- State: Wisconsin
- Founded: 1851
- Named for: Mount Vernon
- Seat: Viroqua
- Largest city: Viroqua

Area
  - Total: 816 sq mi (2,110 km^{2})
  - Land: 792 sq mi (2,050 km^{2})
  - Water: 25 sq mi (65 km^{2}) 3.0%

Population (2020)
  - Total: 30,714
  - Estimate (2025): 31,443 ▲
  - Density: 39.7/sq mi (15.3/km^{2})
- Time zone: UTC−6 (Central)
  - Summer (DST): UTC−5 (CDT)
- Congressional district: 3rd
- Website: www.vernoncountywi.gov

Vernon County is a county in the U.S. state of Wisconsin. As of the 2020 census, the population was 30,714. Its county seat is Viroqua.

== History ==
Vernon County was renamed from Bad Ax County on March 22, 1862. Bad Ax County had been created on March 1, 1851, from territory that had been part of Richland and Crawford counties. The name Vernon was chosen to reflect the county's green fields of wheat and to evoke Mount Vernon.

== Geography ==
According to the U.S. Census Bureau, the county has a total area of 816 square miles (2,110 km^{2}), of which 792 square miles (2,050 km^{2}) is land and 25 square miles (65 km^{2}) (3.0%) is water.

=== Major highways ===
- U.S. Highway 14
- U.S. Highway 61
- Highway 27 (Wisconsin)
- Highway 33 (Wisconsin)
- Highway 35 (Wisconsin)
- Highway 56 (Wisconsin)
- Highway 80 (Wisconsin)
- Highway 82 (Wisconsin)
- Highway 131 (Wisconsin)
- Highway 162 (Wisconsin)

=== Railroads ===
- BNSF

=== Buses ===
- Scenic Mississippi Regional Transit

=== Airports ===
- Viroqua Municipal Airport (Y51) serves the county and surrounding communities.
- The Joshua Sanford Field airport (~~KHBW~~) closed on November 10, 2016.

=== Adjacent counties ===
- La Crosse County – northwest
- Monroe County – north
- Juneau County – northeast
- Sauk County – east
- Richland County – southeast
- Crawford County – south
- Allamakee County, Iowa – southwest
- Houston County, Minnesota – west

== Demographics ==
Historical population
Census	Pop.	Note	%±
1860	11,007		—
1870	18,645		69.4%
1880	23,235		24.6%
1890	25,111		8.1%
1900	28,351		12.9%
1910	28,116		−0.8%
1920	29,252		4.0%
1930	28,537		−2.4%
1940	29,940		4.9%
1950	27,906		−6.8%
1960	25,663		−8.0%
1970	24,557		−4.3%
1980	25,642		4.4%
1990	25,617		−0.1%
2000	28,056		9.5%
2010	29,773		6.1%
2020	30,714		3.2%
2025 (est.)	31,443	▲	2.4%
U.S. Decennial Census:

=== Racial and ethnic composition ===
Vernon County, Wisconsin – Racial and ethnic composition Note: the US Census treats Hispanic/Latino as an ethnic category. This table excludes Latinos from the racial categories and assigns them to a separate category. Hispanics/Latinos may be of any race.
Race / ethnicity (NH = Non-Hispanic)	Pop 1980	Pop 1990	Pop 2000	Pop 2010	Pop 2020	% 1980	% 1990	% 2000	% 2010	% 2020
White alone (NH)	25,512	25,429	27,617	28,873	29,179	99.49%	99.27%	98.44%	96.98%	95.00%
Black or African American alone (NH)	8	12	18	106	121	0.03%	0.05%	0.06%	0.36%	0.39%
Native American or Alaska Native alone (NH)	19	35	33	53	41	0.07%	0.14%	0.12%	0.18%	0.13%
Asian alone (NH)	26	42	60	92	89	0.10%	0.16%	0.21%	0.31%	0.29%
Native Hawaiian or Pacific Islander alone (NH)	x	x	2	7	9	x	x	0.01%	0.02%	0.03%
Other race alone (NH)	24	1	17	11	96	0.09%	0.00%	0.06%	0.04%	0.31%
Mixed race or Multiracial (NH)	x	x	123	237	715	x	x	0.44%	0.80%	2.33%
Hispanic or Latino (any race)	53	98	186	394	464	0.21%	0.38%	0.66%	1.32%	1.51%
Total	25,642	25,617	28,056	29,773	30,714	100.00%	100.00%	100.00%	100.00%	100.00%

=== 2020 census ===
As of the 2020 census, the county had a population of 30,714, the population density was 38.8 people per square mile (15.0 people/km^{2}), and there were 13,813 housing units at an average density of 17.5 units per square mile (6.8 units/km^{2}).

The median age was 41.7 years. 26.0% of residents were under the age of 18 and 20.8% of residents were 65 years of age or older. For every 100 females there were 101.3 males, and for every 100 females age 18 and over there were 100.0 males age 18 and over.

The racial makeup of the county was 95.4% White, 0.4% Black or African American, 0.2% American Indian and Alaska Native, 0.3% Asian, <0.1% Native Hawaiian and Pacific Islander, 0.8% from some other race, and 2.9% from two or more races. Hispanic or Latino residents of any race comprised 1.5% of the population.

13.2% of residents lived in urban areas, while 86.8% lived in rural areas.

There were 12,082 households in the county, of which 28.1% had children under the age of 18 living in them. Of all households, 54.2% were married-couple households, 18.6% were households with a male householder and no spouse or partner present, and 21.1% were households with a female householder and no spouse or partner present. About 28.7% of all households were made up of individuals and 14.2% had someone living alone who was 65 years of age or older.

There were 13,813 housing units, of which 12.5% were vacant. Among occupied housing units, 78.3% were owner-occupied and 21.7% were renter-occupied. The homeowner vacancy rate was 1.5% and the rental vacancy rate was 5.4%.

=== 2000 census ===
2000 Census Age Pyramid for Vernon County

As of the 2000 census, there were 28,056 people, 10,825 households, and 7,501 families residing in the county. The population density was 35 people per square mile (14 people/km^{2}). There were 12,416 housing units at an average density of 16 units per square mile (6.2 units/km^{2}). The racial makeup of the county was 98.81% White, 0.06% Black or African American, 0.15% Native American, 0.21% Asian, 0.01% Pacific Islander, 0.27% from other races, and 0.48% from two or more races. 0.66% of the population were Hispanic or Latino of any race. 38.3% were of Norwegian, 26.9% German, 6.4% Irish and 6.1% English ancestry. 90.9% spoke English, 3.5% German, 1.8% Norwegian, 1.2% Pennsylvania Dutch and 1.0% Spanish as their first language.

There were 10,825 households, out of which 31.50% had children under the age of 18 living with them, 58.70% were married couples living together, 6.80% had a female householder with no husband present, and 30.70% were non-families. 26.70% of all households were made up of individuals, and 13.70% had someone living alone who was 65 years of age or older. The average household size was 2.55 and the average family size was 3.11.

In the county, the population was spread out, with 27.40% under the age of 18, 6.80% from 18 to 24, 25.30% from 25 to 44, 23.50% from 45 to 64, and 17.00% who were 65 years of age or older. The median age was 39 years. For every 100 females there were 97.70 males. For every 100 females age 18 and over, there were 95.60 males.

In 2017, there were 434 births, giving a general fertility rate of 90.5 births per 1000 women aged 15–44, the fourth highest rate out of all 72 Wisconsin counties. Of these births, 123 occurred at home, second only to Clark County which had 184 home births.

In 2010, the largest religious groups by reported number of adherents were ELCA Lutheran at 6,735 adherents, Catholic at 3,060 adherents, Amish at 2,786 adherents, United Methodist at 1,533 adherents, Wisconsin Synod Lutheran at 1,402 adherents, and Non-denominational Christian at 766 adherents.

== Religion ==
Religion in Vernon County, according to ARDA (2020)
1. Mainline Protestant Churches (21.0%)
2. Evangelical Churches (14.7%)
3. Anabaptist Churches (Amish and Mennonite) (11.8%)
4. Catholic Church (6.80%)
5. 0.00%
6. Others (1.10%)
7. None (44.6%)

== Economy ==
The county is home to the headquarters of Organic Valley, the world's largest cooperative of family farmers.

== Parks ==
Vernon County is home to multiple county and state parks. The Kickapoo Valley Reserve, an 8600-acre natural reserve, is between the villages of La Farge and Ontario. Wildcat Mountain State Park is also in the county.

=== County parks and forests ===
- Blackhawk Park
- Duck Egg County Forest
- Esofea/Rentz Memorial Park
- Jersey Valley Park
- Kooyumjian – Lost Creek County Forest
- Runge Hollow Recreation Area
- Sidie Hollow Park
- Wayside Park & Coon Prairie Trail

== Communities ==
=== Cities ===
- Hillsboro
- Viroqua (county seat)
- Westby

=== Villages ===
- Chaseburg
- Coon Valley
- De Soto (partly in Crawford County)
- Genoa
- La Farge
- Ontario
- Readstown
- Stoddard
- Viola (mostly in Richland County)

=== Towns ===
- Bergen
- Christiana
- Clinton
- Coon
- Forest
- Franklin
- Genoa
- Greenwood
- Hamburg
- Harmony
- Hillsboro
- Jefferson
- Kickapoo
- Liberty
- Stark
- Sterling
- Union
- Viroqua
- Webster
- Wheatland
- Whitestown

=== Unincorporated communities ===
- Avalanche
- Bloomingdale
- Bud
- Dilly
- Esofea
- Fargo
- Folsom
- Greenwood
- Kickapoo Center
- Liberty
- Liberty Pole
- Mount Tabor
- Newry
- Newton
- Pleasant Valley
- Purdy
- Red Mound
- Retreat
- Rockton
- Romance
- Ross
- Springville
- Sugar Grove
- Trippville
- Tunnelville (partial)
- Valley
- Victory
- West Prairie
- White City

== Gallery ==
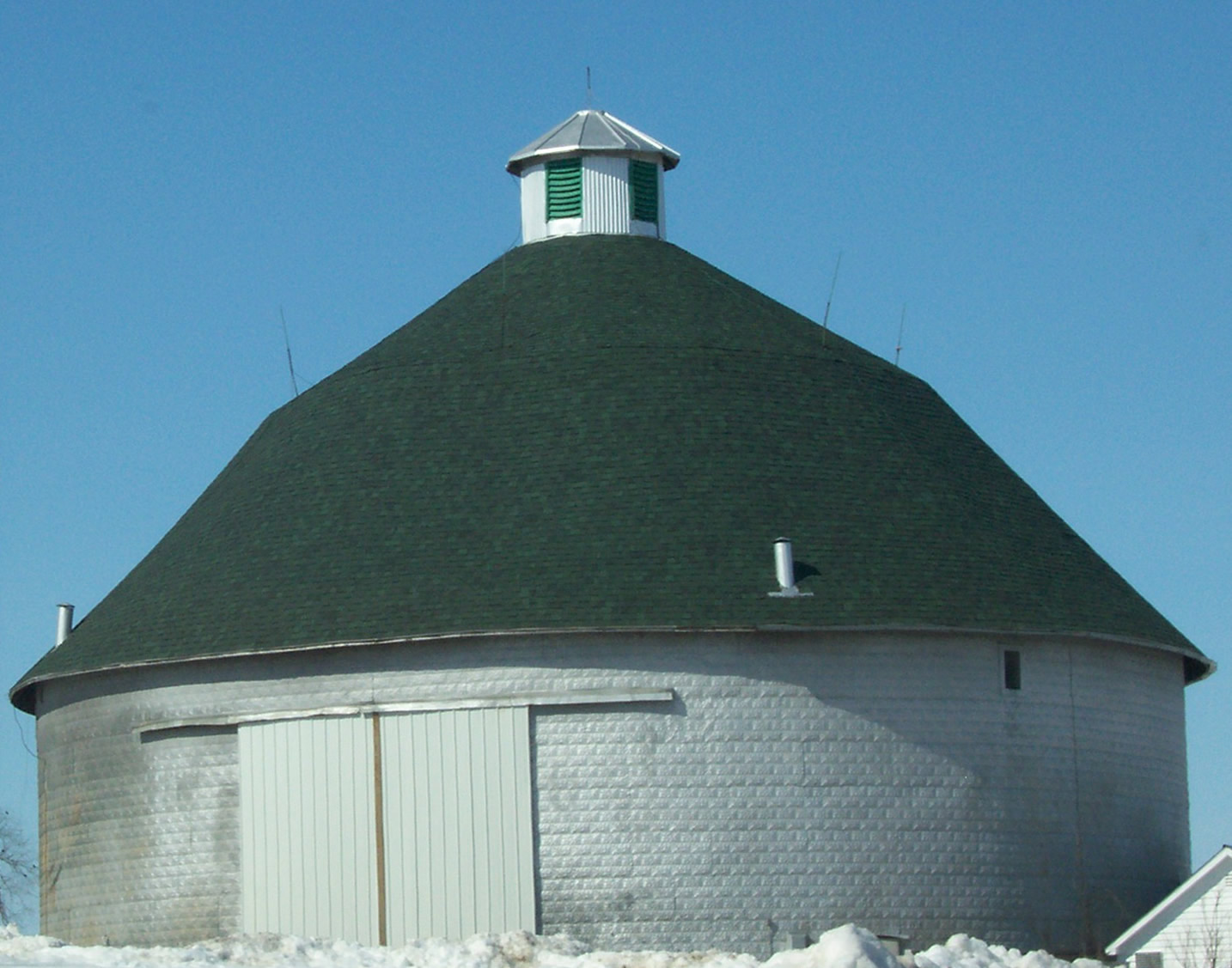
Round barn near Hillsboro

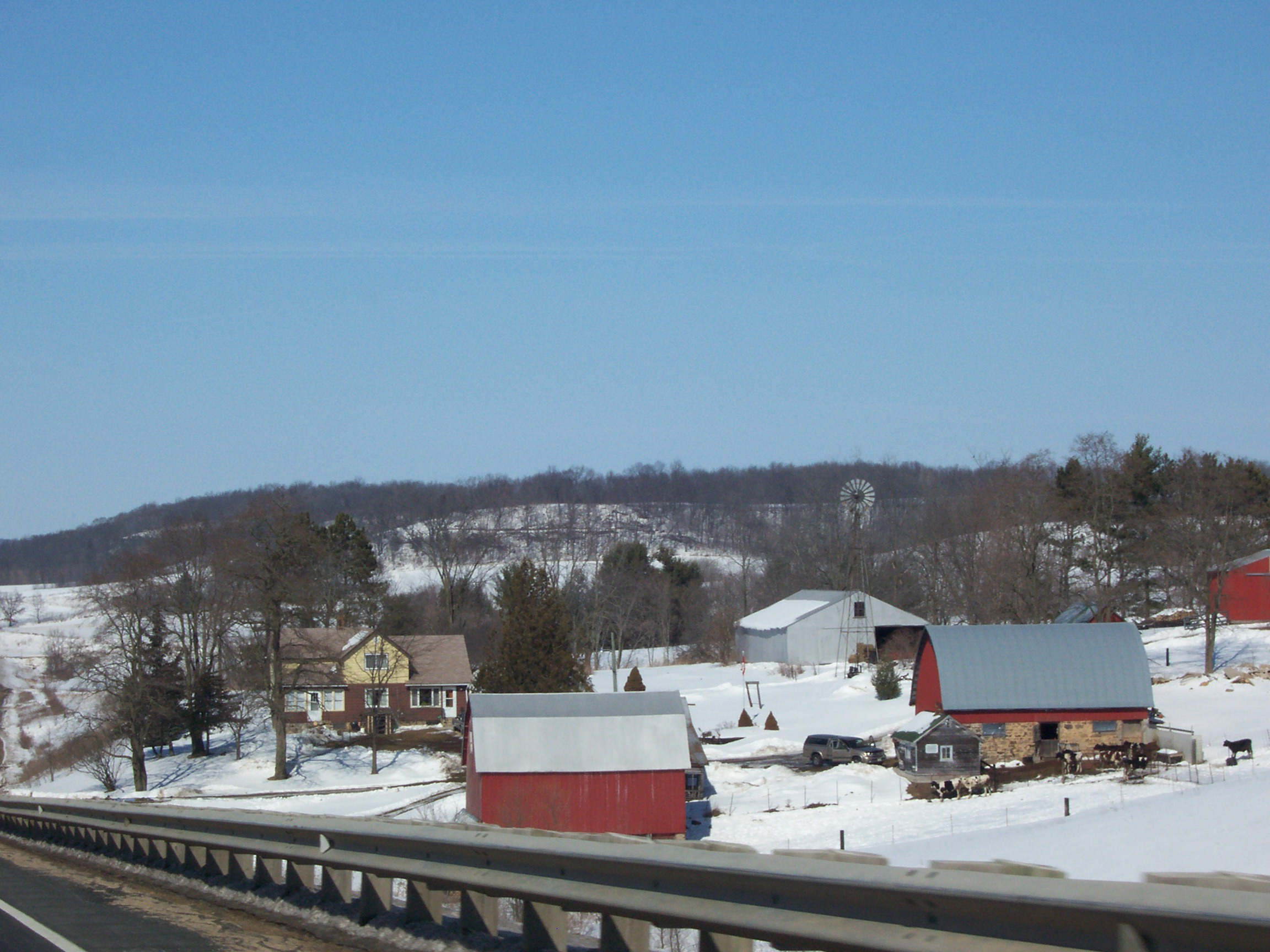
Farm and countryside near Hillsboro, along Wisconsin Highway 80

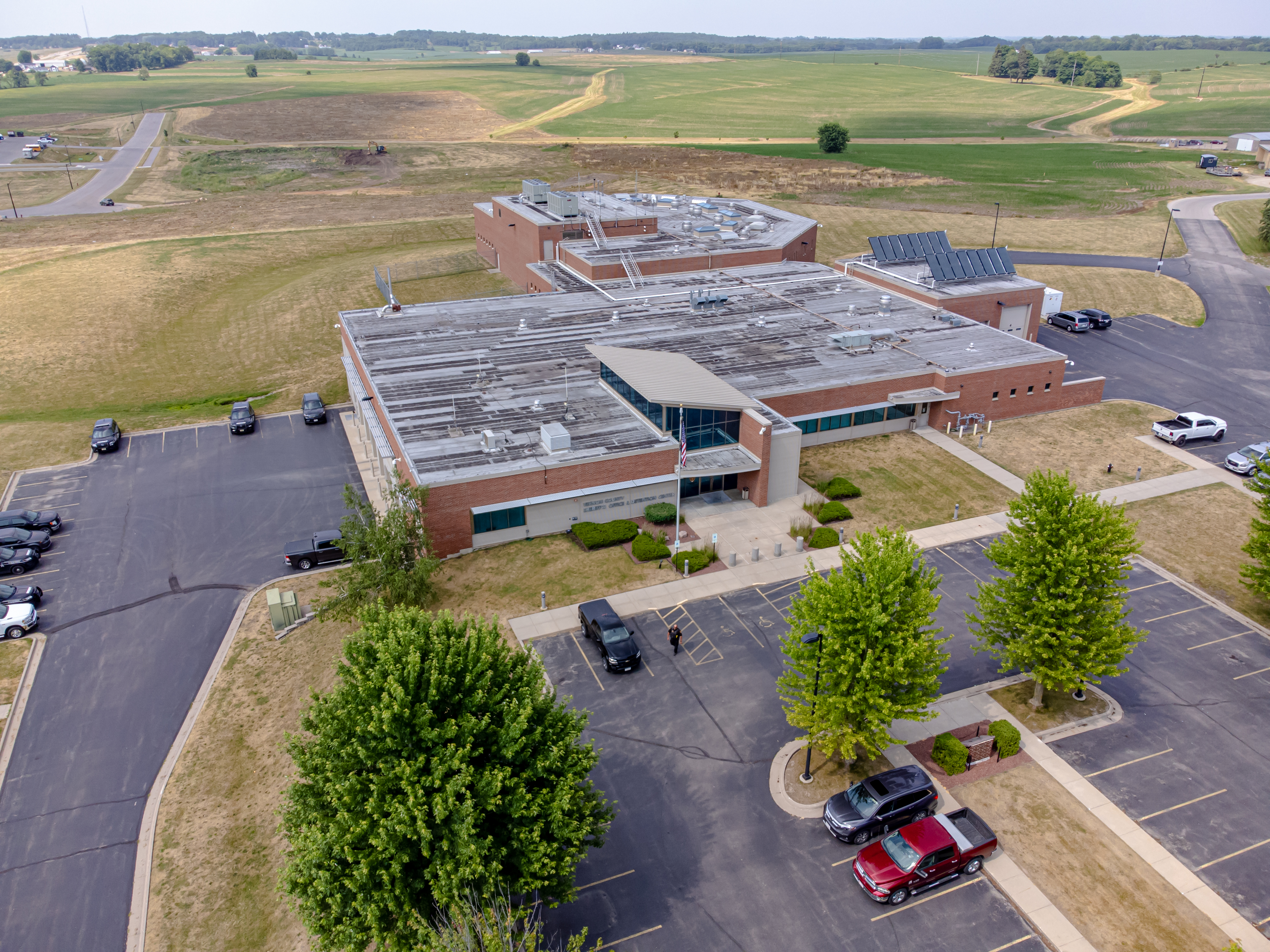
Vernon County jail in Viroqua, Wisconsin

== Politics ==
United States presidential election results for Vernon County, Wisconsin
Year	Republican		Democratic		Third party(ies)	
Year	No.	%	No.	%	No.	%
1892	3,106	59.95%	1,440	27.79%	635	12.26%
1896	4,393	71.35%	1,627	26.43%	137	2.23%
1900	4,463	75.59%	1,268	21.48%	173	2.93%
1904	4,744	82.35%	762	13.23%	255	4.43%
1908	4,114	69.71%	1,561	26.45%	227	3.85%
1912	2,663	57.68%	1,253	27.14%	701	15.18%
1916	2,912	58.63%	1,830	36.84%	225	4.53%
1920	5,694	86.03%	627	9.47%	298	4.50%
1924	2,670	30.41%	406	4.62%	5,703	64.96%
1928	6,596	71.28%	2,559	27.65%	99	1.07%
1932	2,979	32.89%	5,939	65.57%	139	1.53%
1936	4,811	42.36%	6,044	53.22%	502	4.42%
1940	6,614	52.95%	5,776	46.24%	102	0.82%
1944	5,676	51.04%	5,409	48.64%	36	0.32%
1948	4,139	43.71%	5,226	55.18%	105	1.11%
1952	7,619	65.33%	4,032	34.57%	12	0.10%
1956	6,200	55.66%	4,923	44.19%	17	0.15%
1960	6,909	58.75%	4,836	41.12%	15	0.13%
1964	4,640	42.58%	6,242	57.28%	16	0.15%
1968	5,824	55.18%	3,666	34.73%	1,065	10.09%
1972	6,836	65.83%	3,407	32.81%	142	1.37%
1976	6,132	51.56%	5,534	46.54%	226	1.90%
1980	6,528	51.11%	5,501	43.07%	744	5.82%
1984	6,469	55.75%	5,051	43.53%	83	0.72%
1988	5,226	47.17%	5,754	51.94%	98	0.88%
1992	4,072	32.02%	5,673	44.61%	2,971	23.36%
1996	3,796	33.81%	5,572	49.63%	1,858	16.55%
2000	5,684	43.58%	6,577	50.42%	783	6.00%
2004	6,774	45.63%	7,924	53.38%	147	0.99%
2008	5,367	38.13%	8,463	60.13%	245	1.74%
2012	5,942	41.64%	8,044	56.37%	283	1.98%
2016	7,004	49.06%	6,371	44.63%	900	6.30%
2020	8,218	51.61%	7,457	46.83%	248	1.56%
2024	8,807	53.03%	7,514	45.24%	288	1.73%

Vernon County had been a Democratic-leaning county since the 1988 presidential election, but Republican Donald Trump won a plurality of the vote in 2016 and a majority of the vote in 2020 and 2024.

== See also ==
- Blackhawk Park
- National Register of Historic Places listings in Vernon County, Wisconsin
- Upper Mississippi River National Wildlife and Fish Refuge
