= George Apfel Round Barn =

- U.S. National Register of Historic Places
- The barn in 2019

- Location within Wisconsin Location within the United States
- Location: 11314 Cty Hwy P, Clinton, Wisconsin
- Coordinates: 43°39′15″N 90°41′24″W
- Area: less than one acre
- Built: 1914
- Built by: Apfel, George
- Architectural style: Octagon Mode
- NRHP reference No.: 06001155
- Added to NRHP: December 20, 2006

The George Apfel Round Barn near Clinton, Wisconsin, United States, is a round barn that was built in 1914. It was listed on the National Register of Historic Places in 2006.

Another barn of the octagonal-round type, in Wisconsin, is the Dean-Armstrong-Englund Octagonal Barn, built c.1889-93, northeast of Lima, in Rock County.
