= Bloomingdale, Wisconsin =

- Unincorporated community
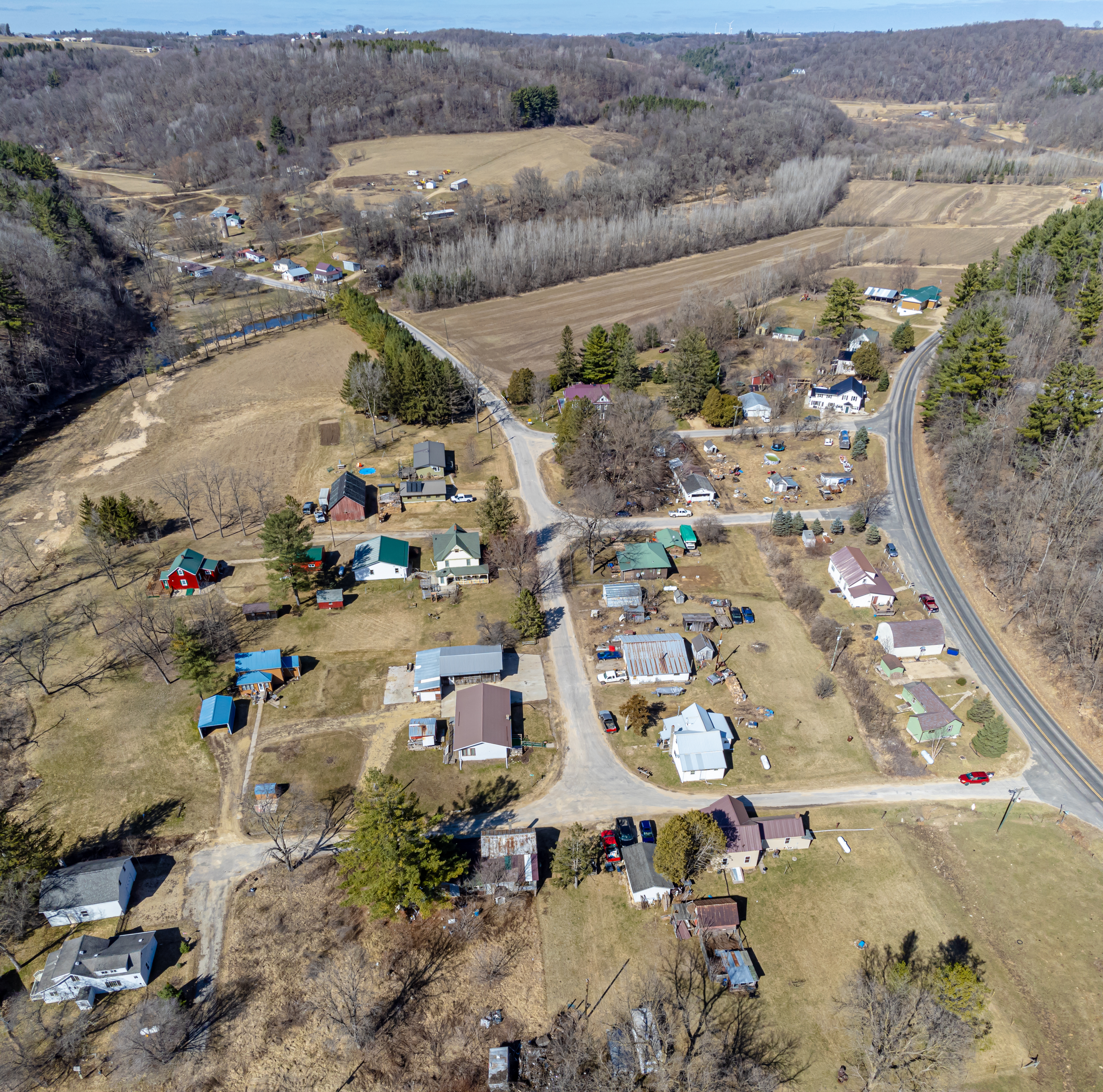
- West Fork Kickapoo River runs through town

- Location within Wisconsin Location within the United States
- Coordinates: 43°38′35″N 90°46′39″W
- Country: United States
- State: Wisconsin
- County: Vernon
- Elevation: 965 ft (294 m)
- Time zone: UTC-6 (Central (CST))
  - Summer (DST): UTC-5 (CDT)
- Area code: 608
- GNIS feature ID: 1561935

Bloomingdale is an unincorporated community in Vernon County, Wisconsin, United States. The community is located on the border of the towns of Clinton and Webster.

== Notable people ==
- Joseph D. Beck, Wisconsin politician
