= Weister Creek =

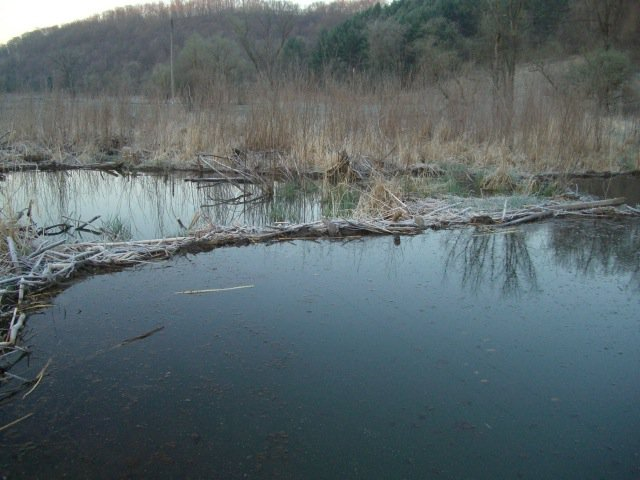
- Beaver Dam on Weister Creek, Wisconsin 2010

Location
- Country: United States
- State: Wisconsin
- Region: Vernon County

Physical characteristics
- Source: Vernon County
  - location: Wisconsin, United States
  - coordinates: 43°41′42″N 90°42′29″W
  - elevation: 1,200 ft (370 m)
- Mouth: Confluence with the Kickapoo River
  - location: Vernon County, Wisconsin
  - coordinates: 43°37′15″N 90°37′39″W
  - elevation: 810 ft (250 m)

Weister Creek is a stream, some 25 miles (40 km) long, in Vernon County (formerly Bad Axe County) in southwestern Wisconsin in the United States and is a tributary of the Kickapoo River. It lies in the Driftless Area which is characterized by hills and valleys apparently missed by the last glacial advance during the Pleistocene. Much of the lower half of Weister Creek is surrounded by wetlands and lies in the Kickapoo Valley Reserve.

== History ==
The area’s history of European settlement dates back to the seventeenth century expedition of Jacques Marquette and Louis Joliet who canoed down the Wisconsin River to the popular fur trading post Fort Crawford, now known as Prairie du Chien. W. T. Sterling is credited for being the first white explorer of Vernon County (formerly Bad Axe). Originally from Kentucky, his family and two other men ventured from Madison to explore the Kickapoo River and its tributaries in 1832.

During the 1820s the Ho-Chunk Nation or Winnebago was forced to give up their reservation and were relocated by the federal government because of desire to exploit the lead ores in the area.

The area known as the Kickapoo Valley Reserve would be "Lake LaFarge" but efforts by the Army Corps of Engineers to build a dam on the Kickapoo River above La Farge, Wisconsin for flood control were abandoned after a 20-year struggle with environmentalists. However, the federal government had acquired property for the dam project and reservoir beginning in 1969, and ultimately 140 farms were purchased from mostly unwilling local property owners. In 1996, the federal Water Resources Development Act was passed, deauthorizing the dam and authorizing the transfer of the 8,569 acres (34.68 km^{2}) mostly back to the State of Wisconsin, but specifying that 1,200 acres (4.9 km^{2}) would be transferred to the federal Bureau of Indian Affairs to be held in trust for the Ho-Chunk.

Wetlands have largely been drained for pasture and comprise a tiny portion of the lands in the Kickapoo River watershed, 0.8%, whereas agriculture accounts for 50.4% of the land use followed closely by forest land at 48%.

== Ecology ==
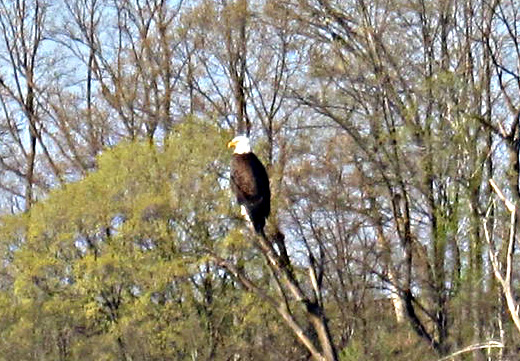
Bald eagle (Haliaeetus leucocephalus) attracted to Weister Creek beaver pond

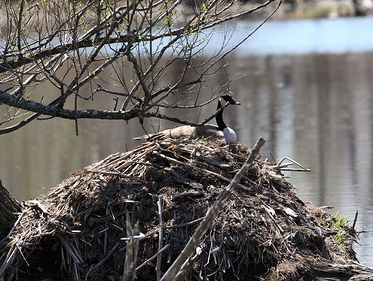
Canada goose nest on beaver lodge

Weister Creek has a reputation as an excellent fishery for brown (Salmo trutta), rainbow (Oncorhynchus mykiss) and brook trout (Salvelinus fontinalis). Weister Creek is a Class III trout stream for its entire length.

Recently a movement called "Save Taryn's Beaver" was launched to save a family of beavers on the upper creek. The beaver is a keystone species, increasing biodiversity in its territory through creation of beaver ponds and wetlands. Not only are riparian habitats enlarged as the circumference of a beaver pond is much greater than the circumference of the two banks of a stream, but aquatic plants colonize newly available watery habitat. Insect, invertebrate, fish, mammal, and bird diversity are also expanded. Beavers benefit bird diversity in numerous ways. Trumpeter swans (Cygnus buccinator) and Canada geese (Branta canadensis) often depend on beaver lodges as nesting sites. As trees are drowned by rising beaver impoundments they become ideal nesting sites for obligate cavity nesters such as wood ducks (Aix sponsa), goldeneyes (Bucephala spp.), mergansers (Mergus spp.), and owls (Titonidae, Strigidae). In addition, beaver ponds have been shown to increase the number of trout, their size, or both, in a study of brook trout (Salvelinus fontinalis), rainbow trout (Oncorhynchus mykiss) and brown trout (Salmo trutta). These findings are consistent with a study of small streams in Sweden, that found that brown trout were larger in beaver ponds compared with those in riffle sections, and that beaver ponds provide habitat for larger trout in small streams during periods of drought. The importance of winter habitat to salmonids afforded by beaver ponds may be especially important (and underappreciated) in streams without deep pools or where ice cover makes contact with the bottom of shallow streams. Cutthroat trout (Oncorhynchus clarki) and bull trout (Salvelinus confluentus) were noted to overwinter in Montana beaver ponds, brook trout congregated in winter in New Brunswick and Wyoming beaver ponds, and coho salmon in Oregon beaver ponds.

In spite of the benefits of beaver to trout and bird abundance and diversity, the Wisconsin Department of Natural Resources continues to recommend removal of trees and brush from the banks of several Kickapoo river watershed streams to reduce beaver colonization. The town of Clinton is holding hearings to decide the fate of the Weister Creek beavers. At the first hearing, May 12, 70 citizens showed up and it was standing room only in a debate between those who wanted to protect the beavers versus those who feared further road damage or loss of pastureland to wetland. At a special follow-up town board meeting on June 1 a compromise was reached to adopt a proposal by Steve Solberg, an environmental engineer of La Crosse and Ben Hansen of Viroqua, for a flow device to permanently lower the beaver pond by 1.5 feet (0.46 m) so that it would not threaten Dell Road and to open up pastureland that had been flooded by the beavers. The lowered pond level should encourage the beaver to relocate downstream. It is hoped that funding will be provided by the Ho Chunk Nation.

== See also ==
- Driftless Area
