= Dean-Armstrong-Englund Octagonal Barn =

- Formerly listed on the U.S. National Register of Historic Places
- Nearest city: Milton, Wisconsin
- Area: less than one acre
- Built: 1893
- Architectural style: Octagon Mode
- MPS: Centric Barns in Rock County TR
- NRHP reference No.: 79003769
- Removed from NRHP: March 30, 1984

The Dean-Armstrong-Englund Octagonal Barn near Whitewater, Wisconsin, Northeast of Lima, Rock County, Wisconsin was built in 1893. It was listed on the National Register of Historic Places in 1979. However it was delisted in 1984 upon its demise.

It is actually an octagonal shape, which meets criteria to be defined as a round barn. It is significant for its incorporation of fieldstone into the random limestone foundation and its transition to new, lighter wood framing. The barn was built by Silas Dean who purchased the property in 1867 who created the windmill-type ventilation system, which was evidence of the experimentation with round barn design. There are also wings to the barn, one of which was more instrumental to the structure. By 1904, the barn was owned by William Armstrong who didn't feel that the windmill was very effective and took it out and built the stave silo on concrete foundations.

Another barn of the octagonal-round type, in Wisconsin, is the George Apfel Round Barn near Clinton, Wisconsin, built 1914.
