= Organic Valley =

Agricultural cooperative based in La Farge, Wisconsin, US

- Type: Agricultural cooperative
- Industry: Organic food
- Founded: 1988; 38 years ago
- Headquarters: La Farge, Wisconsin, United States
- Area served: United States, 25 countries
- Key people: Shawna Nelson CEO
- Products: Milk, butter, cheese, cream, eggs, ham, brussels sprouts, meat
- Revenue: ▼$1.146 billion (2019)
- Operating income: ▼$28.724 million (2019)
- Total assets: ▼$356.726 million (2019)
- Members: 1,500 farmer-owners
- Number of employees: 950
- Divisions: Organic Prairie; Organic Valley Fresh; Organic Logistics
- Website: www.organicvalley.coop

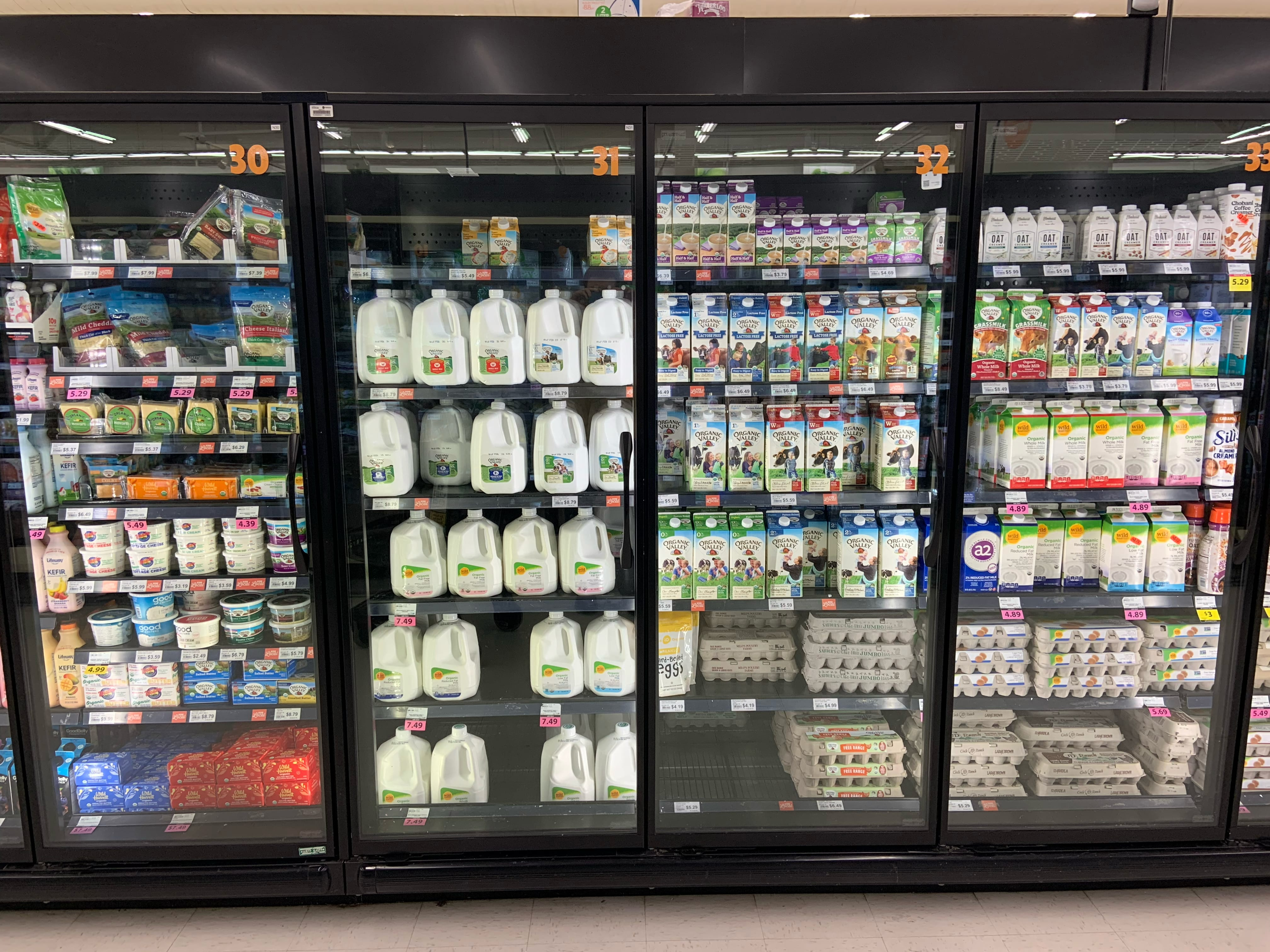
Organic Valley section at Festival Foods

Organic Valley (OV) is an organic food brand and independent cooperative of organic farmers based in La Farge, Wisconsin, United States. Founded in 1988, it is the largest farmer owned organic collective in North America with over $1.2 billion in annual sales as of 2020.

Organic Valley markets milk and various dairy products as well as organic beef, pork, chicken, and turkey products under the Organic Valley or Organic Prairies brand. With 1,500 farmer-owners across the United States, Canada, Australia, and the United Kingdom, Organic Valley markets its products in all 50 states and exports to 25 countries.

== Cooperative history ==
Organic Valley was founded in 1988 under the name 'CROPP (Coulee Region Organic Produce Pool) Cooperative. What began as a group of Wisconsin family farms selling their produce soon expanded into the production and local distribution of vegetables, and dairy products. The brand name "Organic Valley" was soon adopted, and the abbreviation "CROPP" was adjusted to Cooperative Regions of Organic Producer Pools. The original CROPP farms were located throughout southwest Wisconsin, primarily in the Kickapoo River Basin area near the cooperative's headquarters which was built in 2004.

Organic Valley comprises nearly 2,000 farmer-owners located in the United States, Canada, Australia, and the United Kingdom that specialize in sustainable, organic agriculture practices. Organic Valley has become the world's largest independent Cooperative of organic family farmers and one of the nation's largest producers and distributors of organic produce, dairy, soy, and eggs. It also markets its line of beef, pork, turkey, and chicken products under the Organic Prairie brand.

Products are marketed in all 50 states, Canada, China, Japan, and 22 other countries.

In March 2016, construction was completed on a second 200,000 square foot office building on the Cashton campus in order to accommodate continued growth of the organization. The building is large enough to accommodate roughly half of the cooperative's total employees.

In 2019, total annual sales for Organic Valley reached an estimated $1.1 billion. However, milk supply and demand issues along with shifting consumer taste resulted in year-over-year profitability losses for the organization nearing $30 million in the latest 2019 earnings. Restructuring also led to a mixture of nearly 100 layoffs and retirements including the departure of 14 farmer-members.

== Acquisitions and joint ventures ==
Organic Valley purchased Farmers Cooperative Creamery in McMinnville, Oregon 2016. It merges 72 co-op members in Oregon and Washington. It opened in August 2017 and received $350,000 in funds from the State. In 2021, a major fire at the McMinnville Creamery resulted in evacuation order for residents in a 1/2 mile radius due to presence of ammonia at the plant. The fire destroyed the main building, but the plant was rebuilt and resumed operation in May 2022.

In March 2017, Organic Valley announced the creation of Organic Valley Fresh, a 50:50 joint venture with Dean Foods to expand the brand's presence by leveraging Dean Foods' extensive distribution network. Later that year, the organization opened a new 23,000 square foot CALF (Conversion & Labeling Facility) building on the Cashton campus to accommodate growth of producing, cutting, packing, and labeling products.

== Environmental violation ==
The McMinnville creamery was fined $26,574 in 2019 by the Oregon Department of Environmental Quality for illegally dumping milk into the storm drain causing a creek to turn white for 3/4 of a mile. The same plant was fined $12,600 and received eight citations for similar violations in 2018.

== Operations ==
George Siemon, one of the founding farmers of CROPP, was the CEO of Organic Valley for more than 30 years. Once a member of the National Organic Standards Board, Siemon helped set the standards not only for Organic Valley, but is best known for his leadership in organizing farmers and building market support for organic agriculture across the country.

In March 2019, Siemon stepped down as CEO and the board of directors selected Robert Kirchoff, former chief business officer, as interim CEO.

On January 12, 2023, the cooperative announced Jeff Frank as its new CEO.

In March 2025, Organic Valley announced that Shawna Nelson would become the cooperative's fourth CEO and first female executive officer.
