= Keith N. Schoville =

American academic (1928–2026)

Keith Norman Schoville (March 3, 1928 – July 30, 2026) was an American academic. He was a professor emeritus at the University of Wisconsin–Madison, where he specialized in ancient languages.

== Early life and education ==
Schoville was born on March 3, 1928, in Soldiers Grove, Wisconsin. He was a Christian. He was the son of Harley Leonard and Viva Ruth (Banta) Schoville.

He received his BA from Milligan College in 1956, his MA from the University of Wisconsin in 1966, and his PhD from the University of Wisconsin in 1969.

== Academic career ==
Schoville was instructor of Hebrew and Semitic studies at UW-Madison from 1968 to 1970, and was then promoted to professor of Hebrew and Semitic studies, a position he held from 1970 to 1995; he also served as the chairman of the department. He was president of the Near East Archaeological Society, and vice-president of the American Oriental Society's Midwest Section. He was the editor for Hebrew Studies Volumes 24 and 25.

His work investigated the origins of writing and the alphabet and served as project director for an exhibition named Sign, Symbol and Script: An Exhibition on the Origins of Writing which was exhibited at eight locations in the United States, accompanied by a series of 21 public lectures. He was a co-host of the radio program Book and the Spade for 30 years. In the 1980s, he was one of the University of Wisconsin faculty who presented public lectures in the Great Hall of the Memorial Union on various academic topics from a Christian perspective. These lectures were incorporated into the book Christianity Challenges the University.

In 2000, he won the Distinguished Alumni Award from Milligan College.

== Death ==
Schoville died on July 30, 2026, at the age of 98.

== Works ==
=== Books ===
- Beyond the Jordan: Studies in Honor of W. Harold Mare, 2005. Wipf & Stock Pub. ISBN 978-1597520690
- Reports of the Expedition to the Dead Sea Plain, Jordan, vol. 1, Bab edh-Dhra: Excavation in the Century Directed by Paul W. Lapp, 1965–67. The Journal of the American Oriental Society, 2005, volume 1
- The College Press NIV Commentary Ezra-Nehemiah, 2001. College Press Publishing Company, Inc ISBN 978-0899008844
- Genesis to Revelation - Exodus and Leviticus Student Book, 1997. Abingdon Press. ISBN 978-0687062164
- Genesis to Revelation - Hebrews, James, 1 and 2 Peter, 1, 2, 3, John and Jude Student Book, 1997. Abingdon Press. ISBN 978-0687062362
- Basic Bible Commentary Exodus and Leviticus Volume 2, 1994. Abingdon Press. ISBN 978-0687026210
- Hebrews; James; 1 and 2 Peter; 1, 2, and 3; Jude, 1986. Graded Press. ISBN 978-0687062362 * Sign, Symbol, Script. An Exhibition on the Origins of Writing and the Alphabet, 1984. Department of Hebrew and Semitic Studies, University of Wisconsin, Madison
- Biblical Archaeology in Focus, 1978. Baker Book House. ISBN 978-0801081125. According to WorldCat, the book is in 335 libraries. Reviews of this book include, and

=== Other publications ===
- Menahem Mansoor: Scholar, Teacher, Mentor, 1982. Hebrew Studies 1982. volume 23. pages 3–15
- Digging Dan - 1976 Season, 1977.Hebrew Studies volume 18, pages 170-174
- Root-Determinatives in Hebrew, Hurwitz Revisited, 1974. Hebrew Abstracts volume 15, pages 47–49
