= La Farge, Wisconsin =

- Village
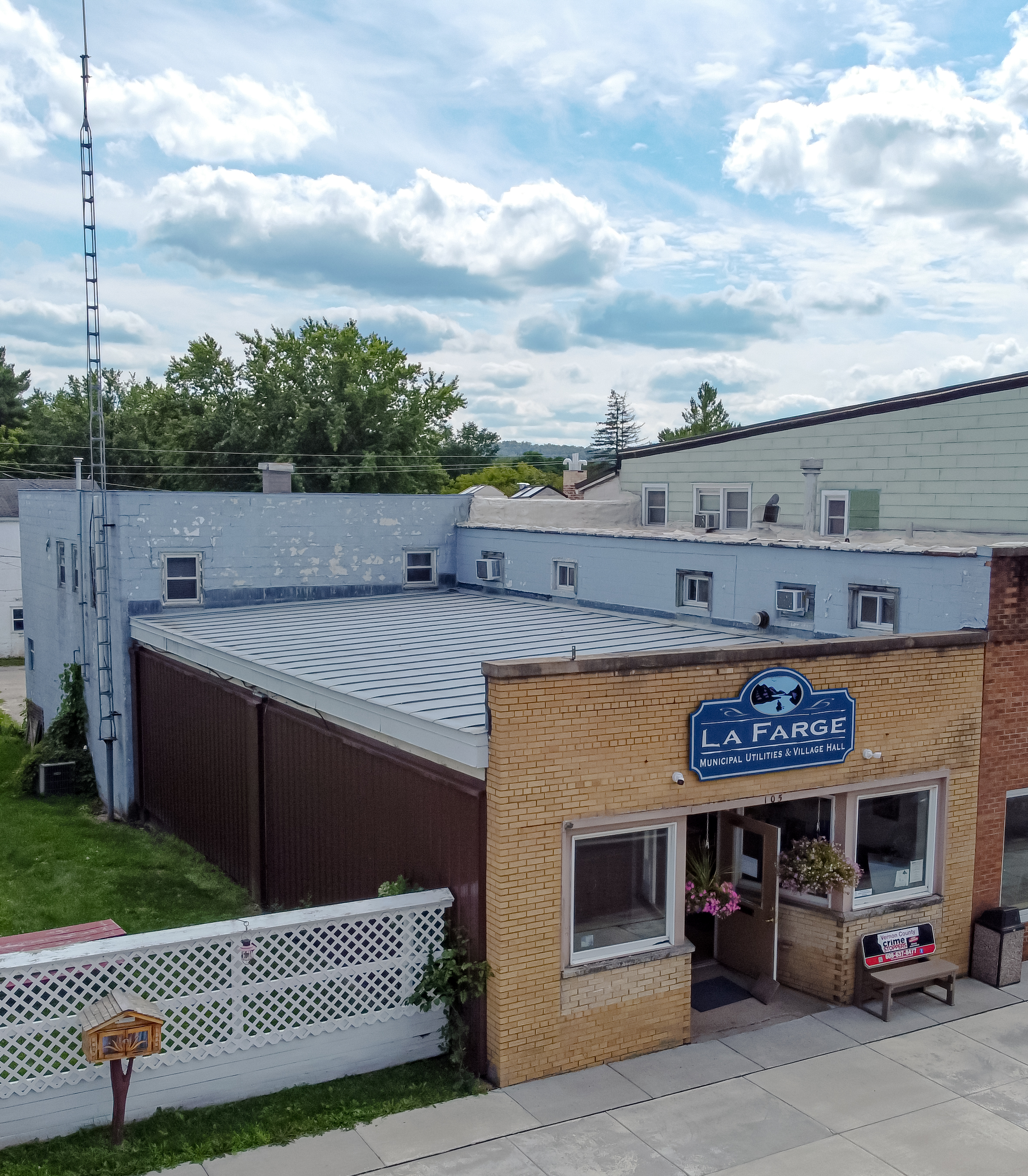
- Village hall

- Location of La Farge in Vernon County, Wisconsin.
- Coordinates: 43°34′36″N 90°38′18″W
- Country: United States
- State: Wisconsin
- County: Vernon

Area
  - Total: 1.03 sq mi (2.68 km^{2})
  - Land: 1.01 sq mi (2.61 km^{2})
  - Water: 0.027 sq mi (0.07 km^{2})
- Elevation: 797 ft (243 m)

Population (2020)
  - Total: 730
  - Estimate (2022): 720
  - Density: 752.5/sq mi (290.54/km^{2})
- Time zone: UTC-6 (Central (CST))
  - Summer (DST): UTC-5 (CDT)
- Area code: 608
- FIPS code: 55-40875
- GNIS feature ID: 1567689
- Website: www.lafarge-wisconsin.com

La Farge is a village along the Kickapoo River in Vernon County, Wisconsin, United States. Its population was 730 at the 2020 census.

== Geography ==
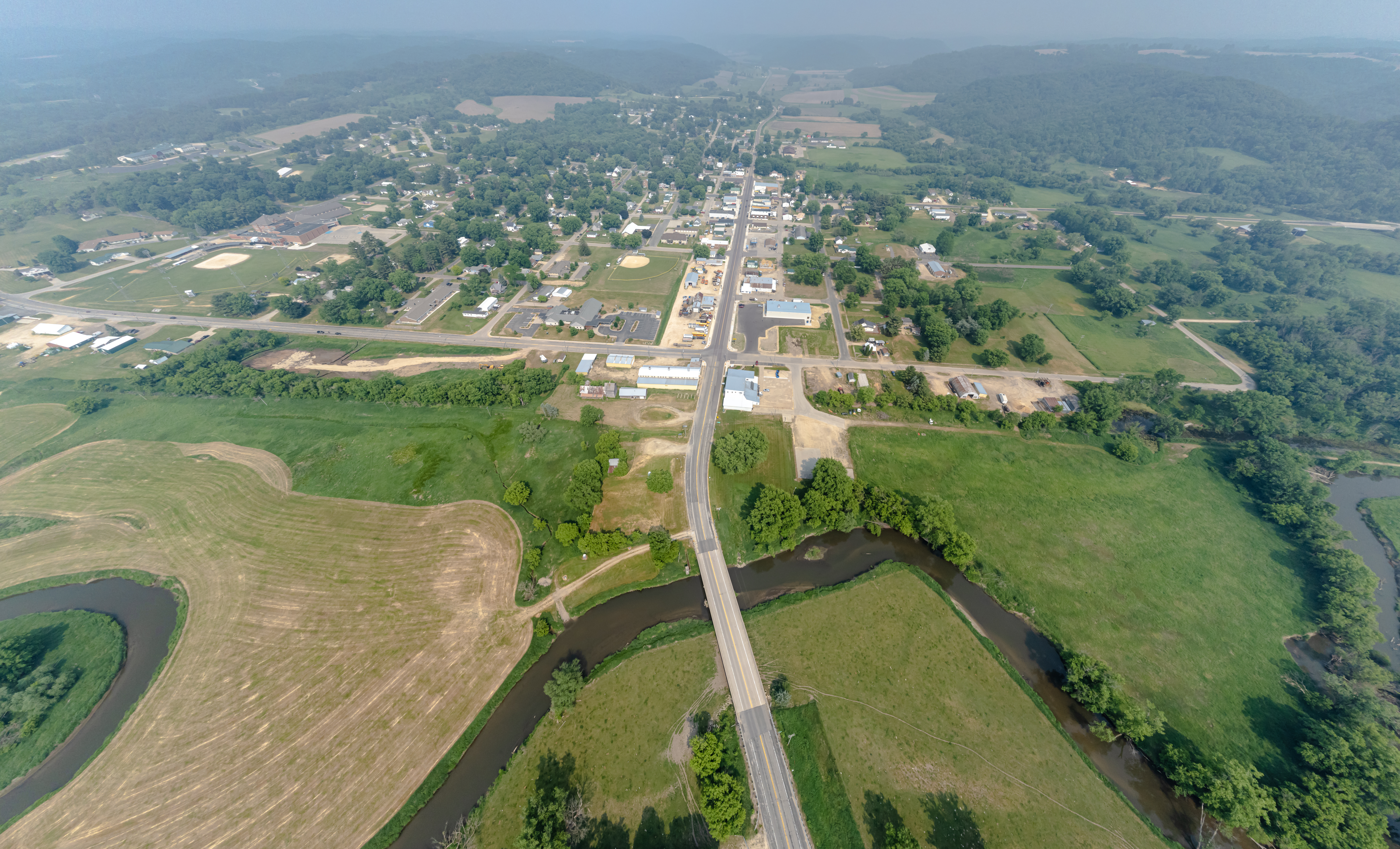

La Farge is located at 43°34′36″N 90°38′18″W (43.576572, -90.638239).

According to the United States Census Bureau, the village has a total area of 1.10 square miles (2.85 km^{2}), of which 0.03 square miles (0.08 km^{2}) is covered by water. The Kickapoo River flows through the village.

== Demographics ==
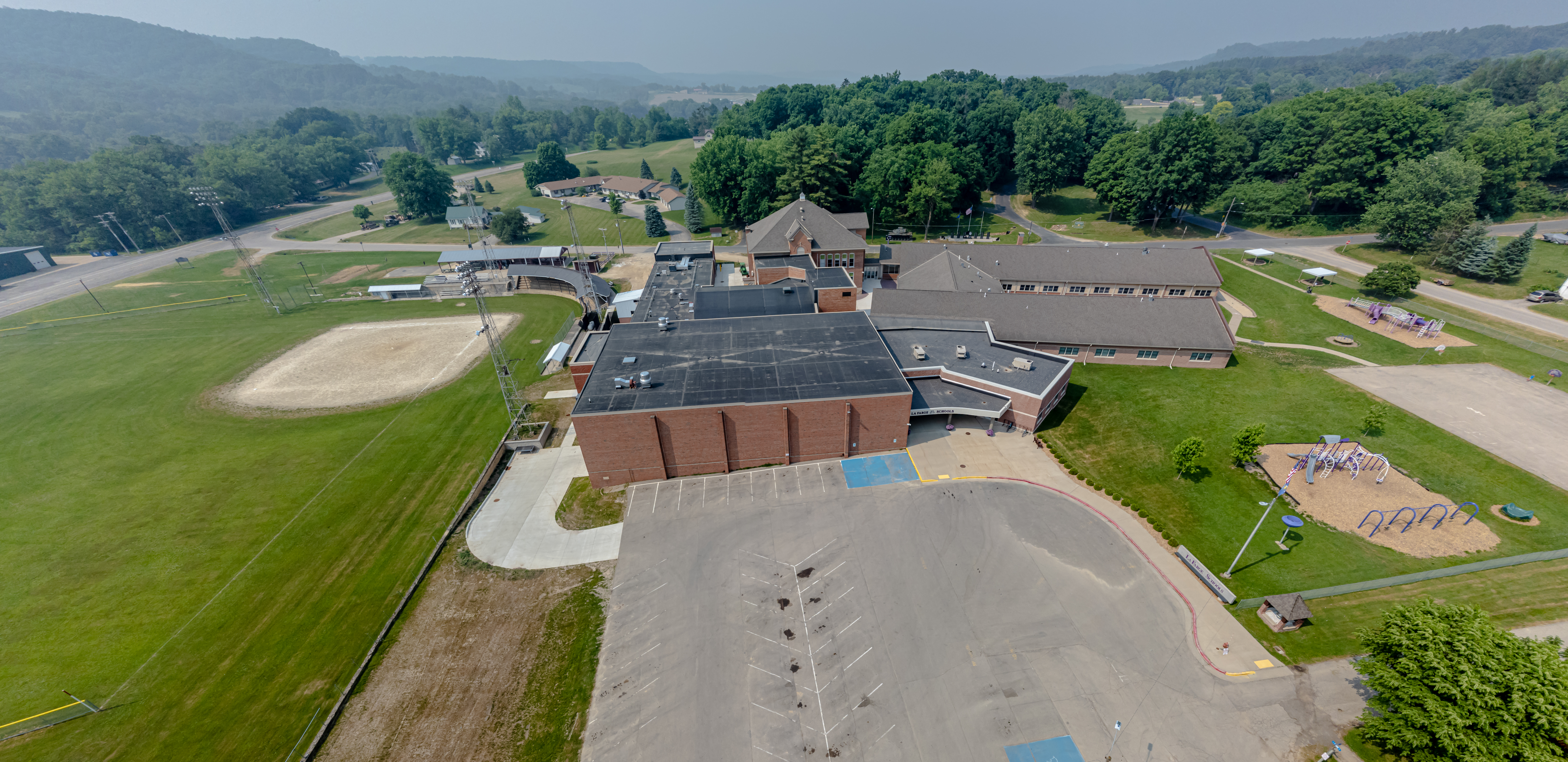
La Farge schools

Historical population
| Census | Pop. | Note | %± |
|---|---|---|---|
| 1900 | 488 | | — |
| 1910 | 654 | | 34.0% |
| 1920 | 788 | | 20.5% |
| 1930 | 756 | | −4.1% |
| 1940 | 921 | | 21.8% |
| 1950 | 905 | | −1.7% |
| 1960 | 833 | | −8.0% |
| 1970 | 748 | | −10.2% |
| 1980 | 746 | | −0.3% |
| 1990 | 766 | | 2.7% |
| 2000 | 775 | | 1.2% |
| 2010 | 746 | | −3.7% |
| 2020 | 730 | | −2.1% |
| 2022 (est.) | 720 | ▼ | −1.4% |
U.S. Decennial Census

=== 2010 census ===
As of the census of 2010, 746 people, 332 households, and 186 families lived in the village. The population density was 697.2 inhabitants per square mile (269.2/km^{2}). The 375 housing units had an average density of 350.5 per square mile (135.3/km^{2}). The racial makeup of the village was 97.1% White, 0.3% African American, 1.6% Native American, 0.1% Asian, 0.1% from other races, and 0.8% from two or more races. Hispanics or Latinos of any race were 0.4% of the population.

Of the 332 households, 24.7% had children under 18 living with them, 38.0% were married couples living together, 11.7% had a female householder with no husband present, 6.3% had a male householder with no wife present, and 44.0% were not families. About 37.3% of all households were made up of individuals, and 15.9% had someone living alone who was 65 or older. The average household size was 2.17, and the average family size was 2.78.

The median age in the village was 42.8 years; 20.5% of residents were under 18; 7.7% were 18 to 24; 24.7% were 25 to 44; 28.1% were 45 to 64; and 19% were 65 or older. The gender makeup of the village was 50.7% male and 49.3% female.

=== 2000 census ===
As of the census of 2000, 775 people, 342 households, and 200 families resided in the village. The population density was 745.4 people per square mile (287.7/km^{2}). The 366 housing units had an average density of 352.0 per square mile (135.9/km^{2}). The racial makeup of the village was 97.29% White, 0.13% African American, 0.65% Native American, 0.13% Pacific Islander, 0.52% from other races, and 1.29% from two or more races. Hispanics or Latinos of any race were 0.65% of the population.

There were 342 households, out of which 26.3% had children under the age of 18 living with them, 43.6% were married couples living together, 9.4% had a female householder with no husband present, and 41.5% were non-families. 38.6% of all households were made up of individuals, and 22.2% had someone living alone who was 65 years of age or older. The average household size was 2.20 and the average family size was 2.90.

In the village, the age distribution was 25.7% under 18, 7.9% from 18 to 24, 22.1% from 25 to 44, 24.5% from 45 to 64, and 19.9% who were 65 or older. The median age was 41 years. For every 100 females, there were 95.2 males. For every 100 females 18 and over, there were 96.6 males.

The median income for a household in the village was $23,083, and for a family was $33,750. Males had a median income of $26,818 versus $19,833 for females. The per capita income for the village was $14,191. About 12.1% of families and 14.4% of the population were below the poverty line, including 18.3% of those under 18 and 10.7% of those 65 or over.

== Transportation ==
La Farge is located at "the Corners", the intersection and concurrency of Wisconsin Highway 82 and Wisconsin Highway 131.

== Economy ==
La Farge is home to the headquarters of Organic Valley, a farmer-owned organic-culture cooperative.

The economy of the Kickapoo Vally above La Farge has evolved slowly over the past 150 years. Fur trading was the first economic activity. The Ho-Chunk and other Native Americans sold pelts of beaver, muskrat, to European and then American traders in exchange for European and American goods. Fur trading was common from the late 1600s to the 1840s, when logging surpassed its importance.

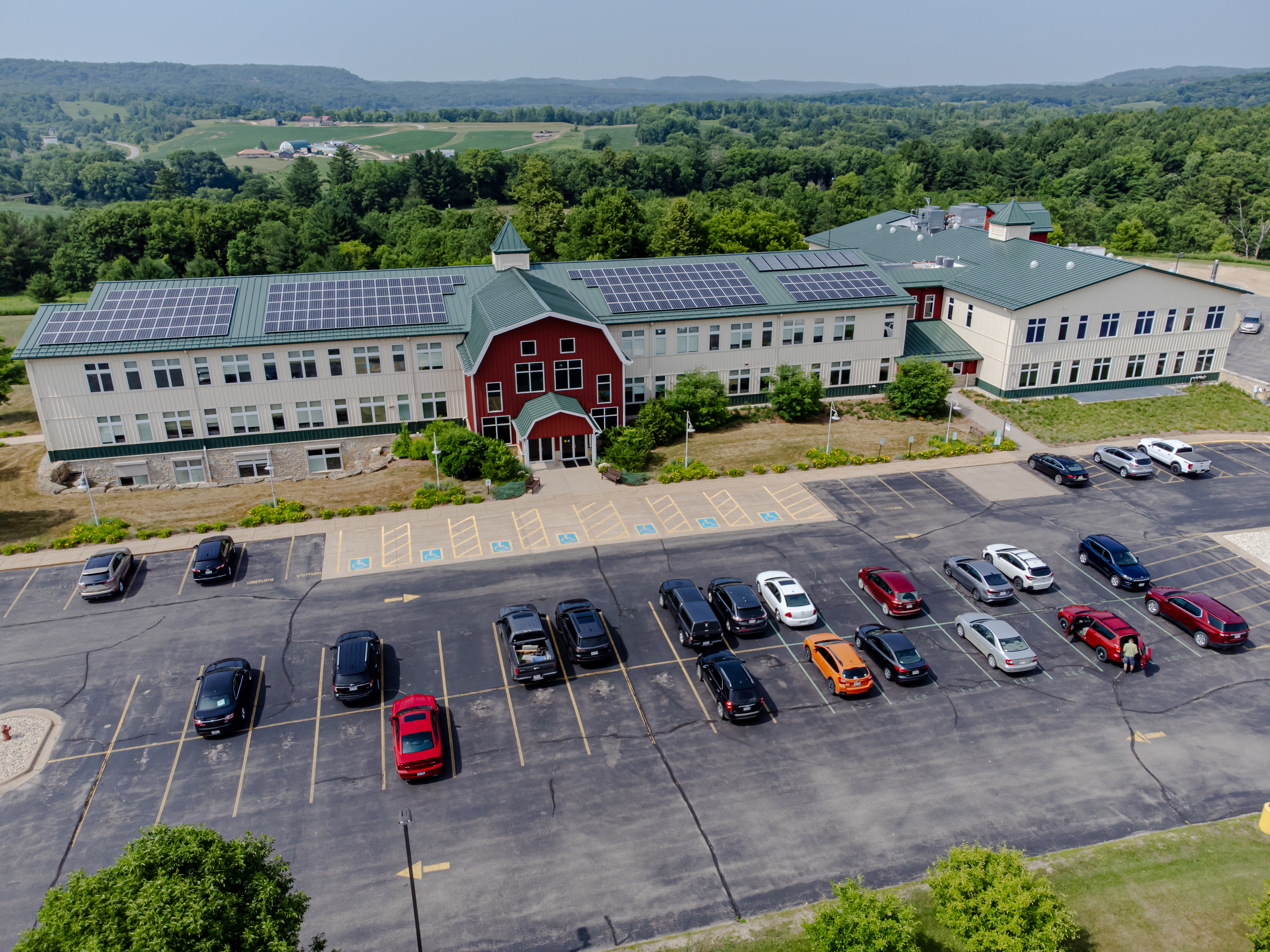
Organic Valley's global headquarters, also known as "the modern barn" in La Farge, Wisconsin

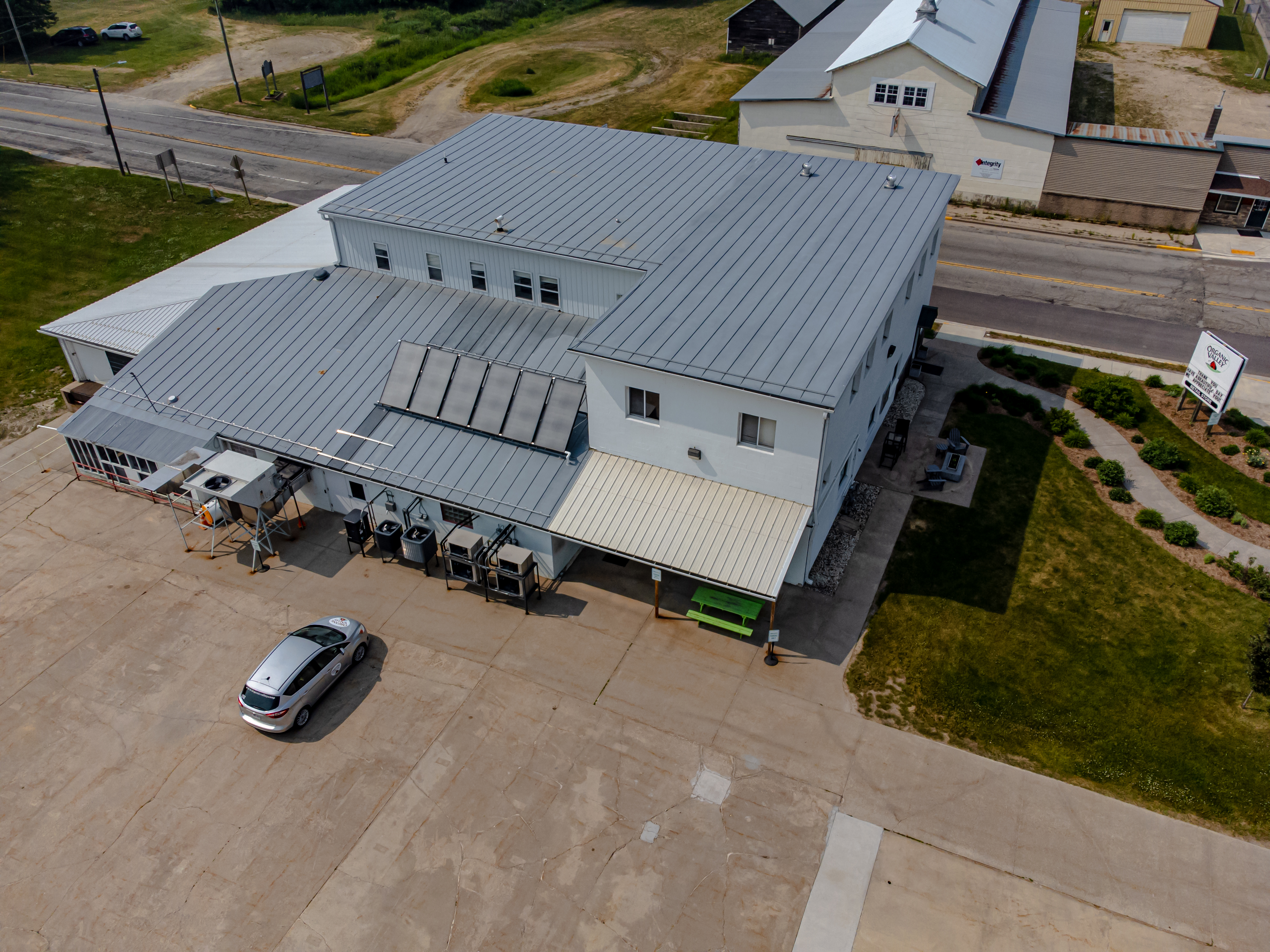
Organic Valley retail store in La Farge
