= Kickapoo River =

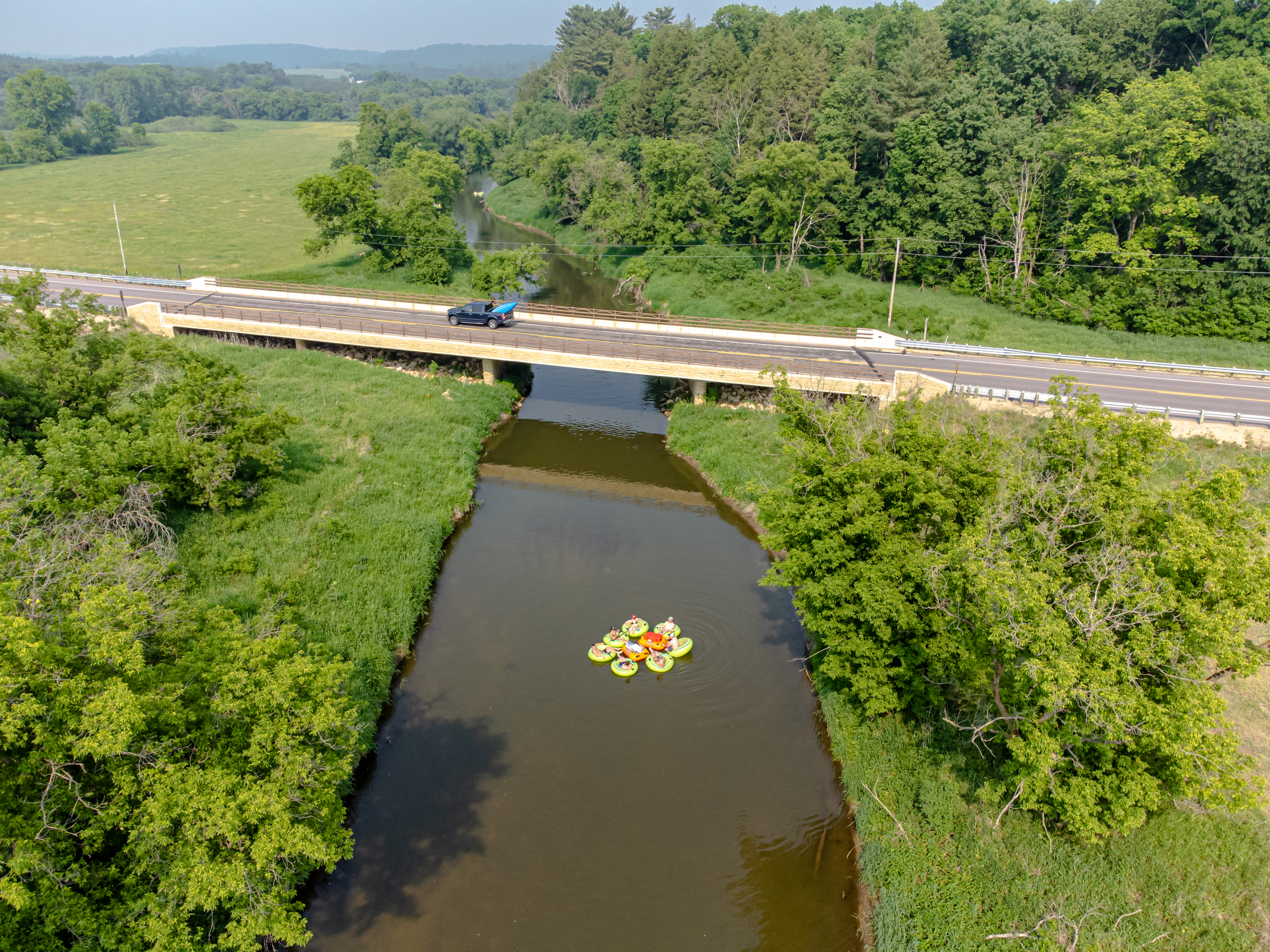

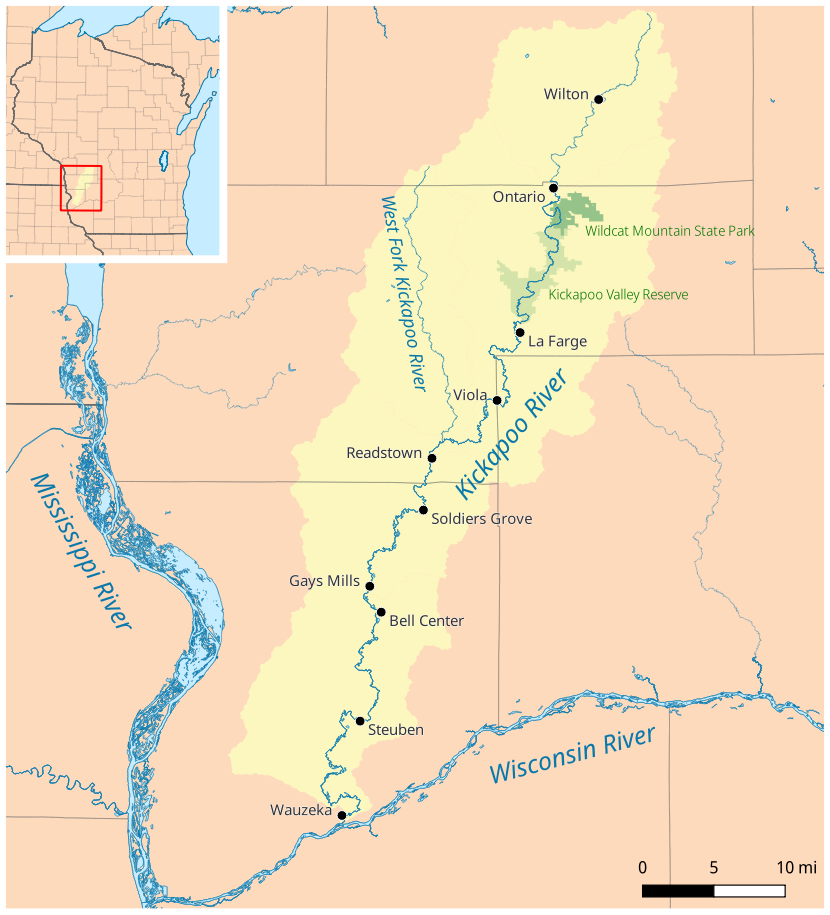
- Kickapoo River watershed map

Location
- Country: United States
- State: Wisconsin
- Region: Monroe County, Vernon County, Richland County, Crawford County

Physical characteristics
- Source: Midway between Wilton and Mill Bluff State Park
  - location: Monroe County, Wisconsin, United States
  - coordinates: 43°53′53″N 90°27′27″W
  - elevation: 1,200 ft (370 m)
- Mouth: Confluence with the Wisconsin River
  - location: Wauzeka, Wisconsin, Crawford County, Wisconsin
  - coordinates: 43°04′36″N 90°52′59″W
  - elevation: 623 ft (190 m)

Basin features
- Tributaries
  - left: Billings Creek
  - right: Moore Creek, Weister Creek, West Fork of the Kickapoo River, Reads Creek, Tainter Creek

The Kickapoo River is a 126-mile-long (203 km) tributary of the Wisconsin River in the state of Wisconsin, United States. It is named for the Kickapoo Indians who occupied Wisconsin before the influx of white settlers in the early 19th century.

== Watershed ==
The river begins midway between Wilton, Wisconsin, and Mill Bluff State Park and flows south through a deep valley cut into the hilly Driftless Zone of southwest Wisconsin. It empties into the Wisconsin River just south of Wauzeka, Wisconsin. Kickapoo is an Algonquian word meaning "one who goes here, then there", a fitting name as the river is very crooked, frequently doubling back on itself as it flows through the Wisconsin landscape. Because of the extremely crooked path of the river, its source north of Wilton is just 60 miles (97 km) from its mouth at Wauzeka, although the river is nearly 130 miles (210 km) long. The Kickapoo, the longest tributary of the Wisconsin River, drains over 800 square miles (2,100 km^{2}) of land in Monroe, Vernon, Richland, and Crawford counties. The Kickapoo River watershed encompasses 492,000 acres (1,990 km^{2}) in southwest Wisconsin.

There are many small tributaries with the most significant being Moore Creek, Billings Creek, the West Fork of the Kickapoo, Reads Creek and Tainter Creek.

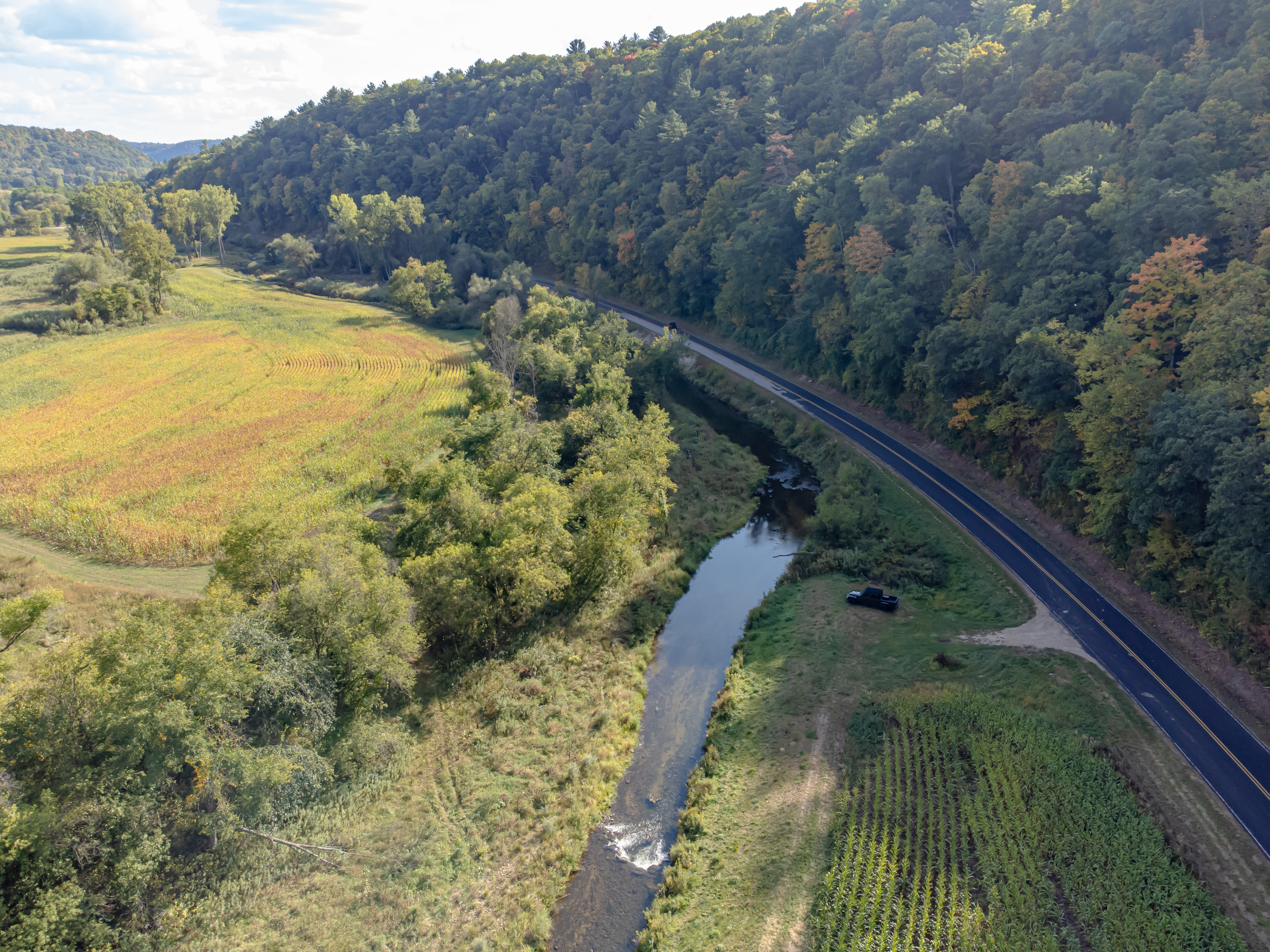
West Fork Kickapoo River

Wetlands have largely been drained for pasture and comprise a tiny portion of the lands in the Kickapoo River watershed, 0.8%, whereas agriculture accounts for 50.4% of the land use followed closely by forest land at 48%.

== Ecology and conservation ==
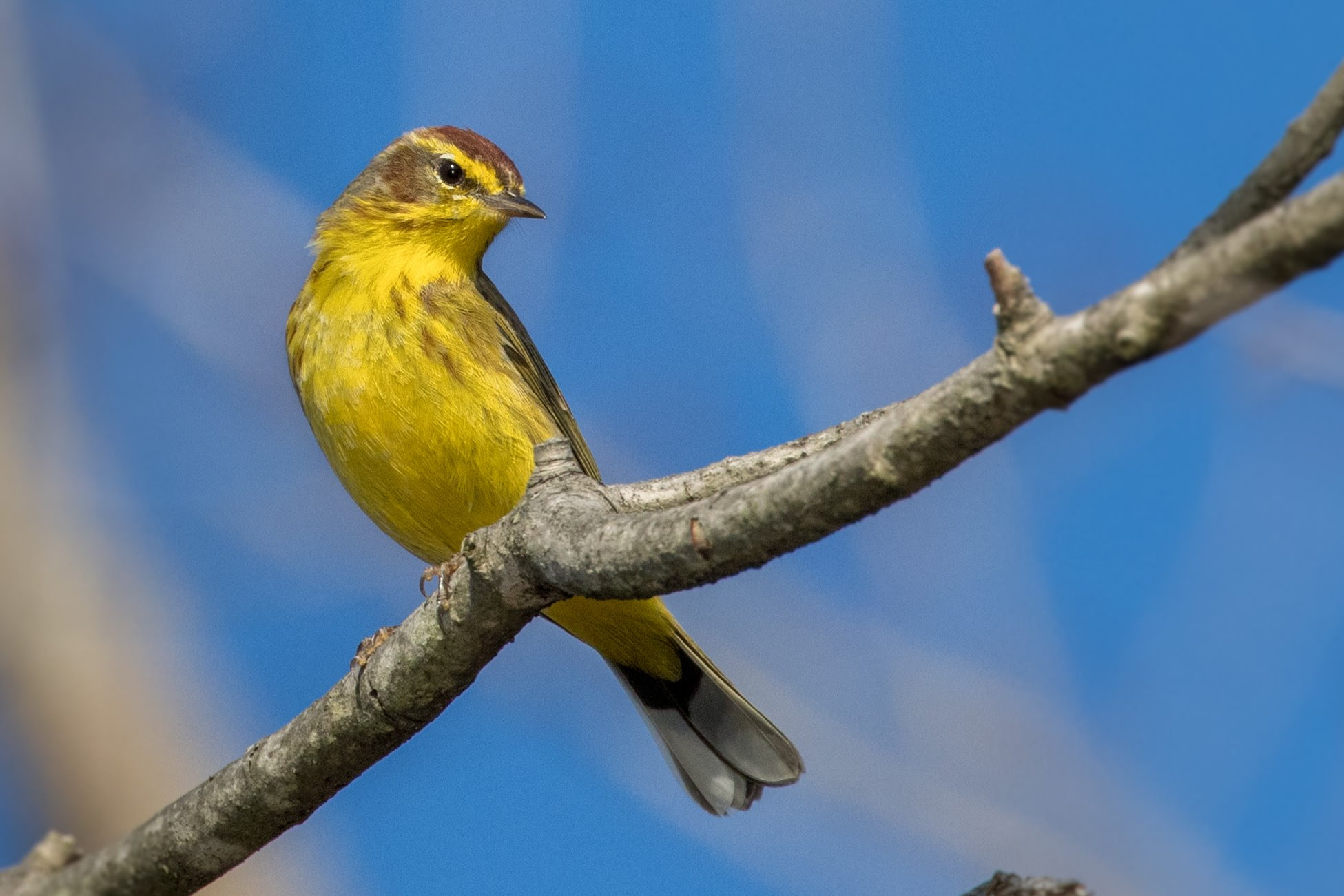
Palm warblers breed in the Kickapoo Valley

Wildcat Mountain State Park and the Kickapoo Valley Reserve form a continuous protected area. Most of the tributary streams and the Kickapoo River itself, upstream of Gays Mills, are good trout habitat due to the baseflow from coldwater springs and watershed and stream projects carried out over the recent decades. The river "contains over 500 miles (800 km) of coldwater streams with populations of Brown trout (Salmo trutta) and Brook trout (Salvelinus fontinalis). Half of these streams have naturally reproducing trout populations."

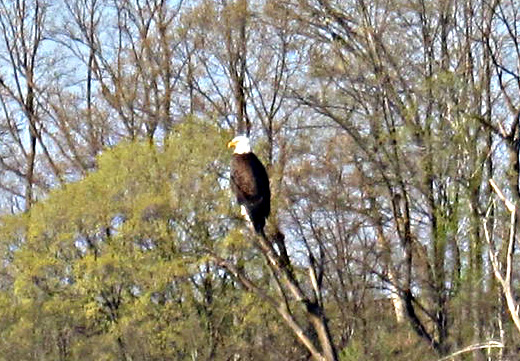
Bald eagle (Haliaeetus leucocephalus) attracted to Weister Creek beaver pond

Recently a movement called "Save Taryn's Beaver" was launched to save a family of beavers on Weister Creek, a tributary of the Kickapoo. The beaver is a keystone species, increasing biodiversity in its territory through creation of beaver ponds and wetlands. Not only are riparian habitats enlarged as the circumference of a beaver pond is much greater than the circumference of the two banks of a stream, but aquatic plants colonize newly available watery habitat. Insect, invertebrate, fish, mammal, and bird diversity are also expanded. Beavers benefit bird diversity in numerous ways. Trumpeter swans (Cygnus buccinator) and Canada geese (Branta canadensis) often depend on beaver lodges as nesting sites. As trees are drowned by rising beaver impoundments, they become ideal nesting sites for obligate cavity nesters such as wood ducks (Aix sponsa), goldeneyes (Bucephala spp.), mergansers (Mergus spp.), and owls (Titonidae, Strigidae). In addition, beaver ponds have been shown to increase the number of trout, their size, or both, in a study of brook trout (Salvelinus fontinalis), rainbow trout (Oncorhynchus mykiss), and brown trout (Salmo trutta). These findings are consistent with a study of small streams in Sweden, that found that brown trout were larger in beaver ponds compared with those in riffle sections, and that beaver ponds provide habitat for larger trout in small streams during periods of drought. The importance of winter habitat to salmonids afforded by beaver ponds may be especially important (and underappreciated) in streams without deep pools or where ice cover makes contact with the bottoms of shallow streams. Cutthroat trout (Oncorhynchus clarki) and bull trout (Salvelinus confluentus) were noted to overwinter in Montana beaver ponds, brook trout congregated in winter in New Brunswick and Wyoming beaver ponds, and coho salmon in Oregon beaver ponds.

In spite of the benefits of beaver to trout and bird abundance and diversity, the Wisconsin Department of Natural Resources continues to recommend removal of trees and brush from the banks of several Kickapoo river watershed streams to reduce beaver colonization.

== Demise of La Farge Dam ==
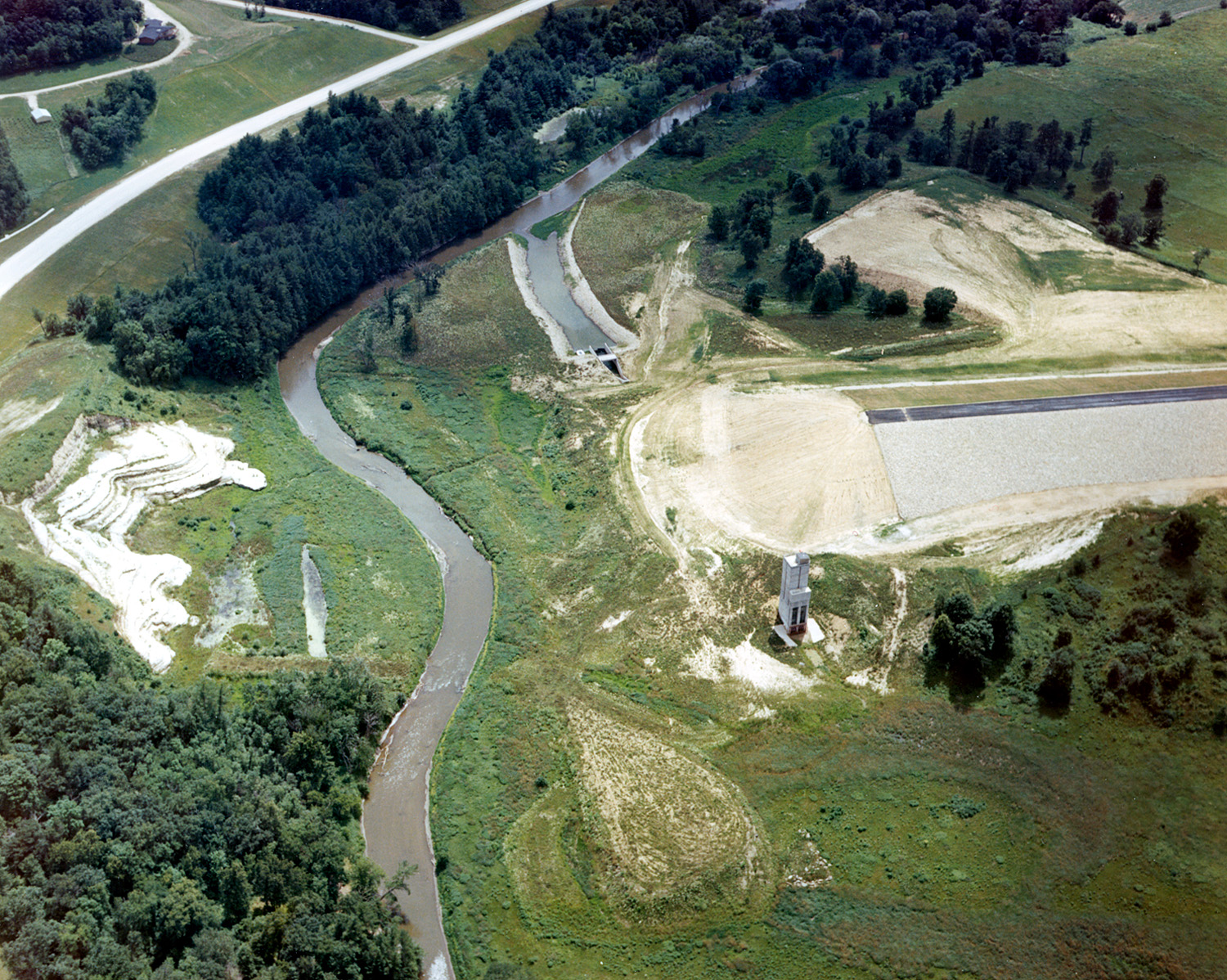
The uncompleted dam with spillway and intake tower near La Farge, Wisconsin

The river has a relatively low capacity for water, leading it to quickly and frequently flood after heavy rain. In the late 1960s, the frequent floods prompted the U.S. Army Corps of Engineers to begin a dam project on the Kickapoo River near La Farge, Wisconsin. The proposed dam would have created a 1,780-acre (7.2 km^{2}), 12-mile-long (19 km) long reservoir to control downstream flooding. In preparation for the construction, the government used eminent domain to buy 149 farms comprising 8,569 acres (34.68 km^{2}) of land from mostly unwilling sellers. This land would have either been flooded by the dam or used as for the recreational park planned for the area around the lake.

Construction of the dam began in 1971. Questions about the Corps of Engineers' benefit-cost calculations, its environmental analysis and the prospect of ecological problems like the eutrophication of the dam's impoundment led to opposition from environmental organizations, some residents of the Kickapoo Valley, and Wisconsin Sen. Gaylord Nelson. After many lawsuits and numerous environmental and economic studies by outside activists highlighting the negative impact of the dam, the government elected to halt construction in 1975, after spending more than $19 million and building nearly half of the dam and leaving local residents vulnerable to future flooding. The halting of the project also doomed the 1983 attempt by local residents to get government support for a smaller flood-control dry dam. Lawsuits by local residents in the valley to force completion of the project were rejected.

The 8,569 acres (34.68 km^{2}) of land bought by the government remained in the possession of the Corps of Engineers until 1996, when it was split and parts were given to the state of Wisconsin and the Ho-Chunk Native American Tribe. The Kickapoo today is a popular canoeing river.

== Flooding ==
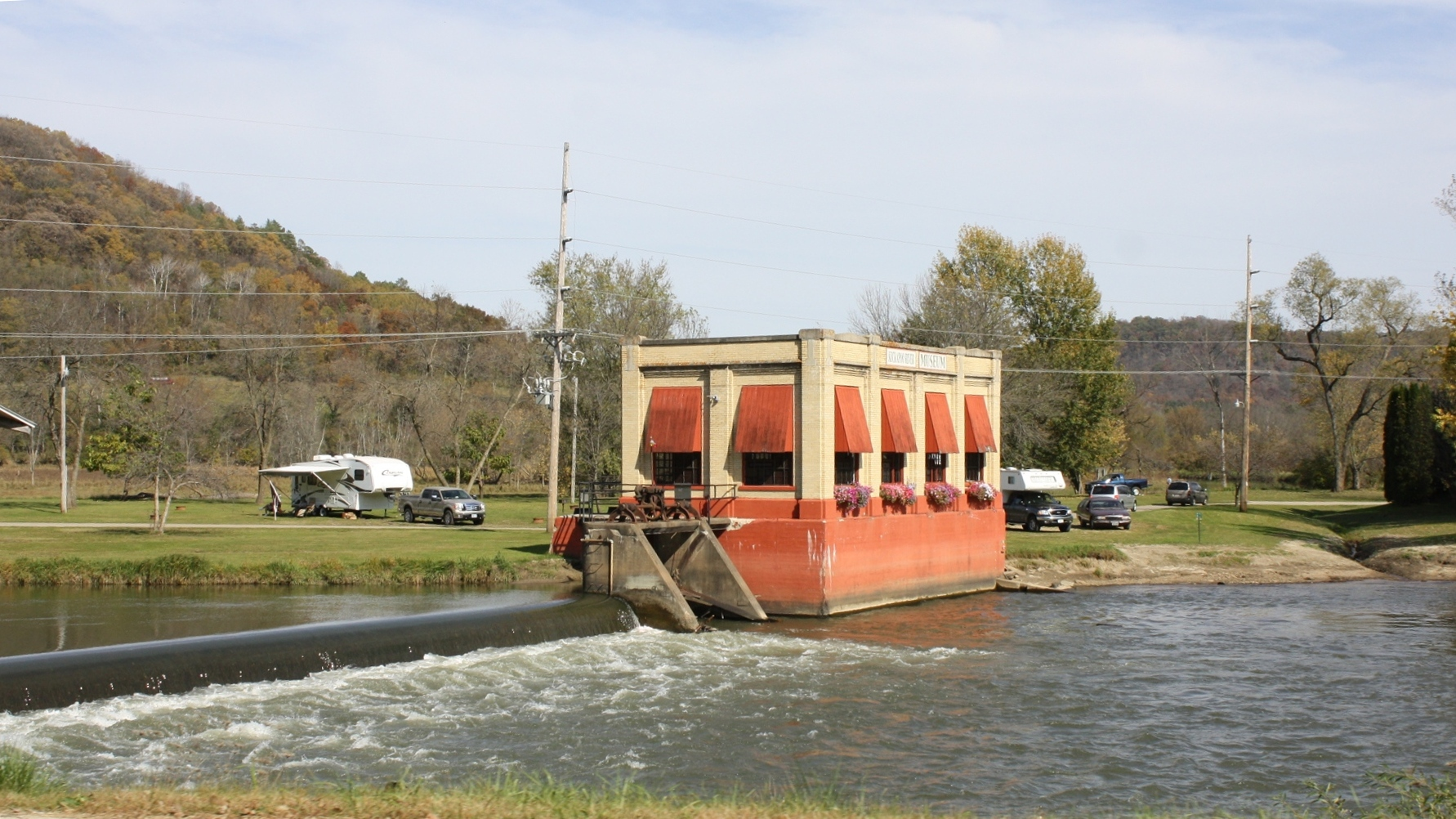
Kickapoo River in Gays Mills in 2010

Nationwide, the construction of flood-control structures has saved lives and property, but in some cases, structures have been found to result in greater loss of life and property than if they had not been built. Dams, for example, encourage downstream development; if they fail, as some do, the destruction can be catastrophic. Today, an increasing number and intensity of extreme weather events is sometimes exceeding the design capacity of flood-control structures. Because of the abandonment of the La Farge flood control project, the Kickpoo Valley continues to suffer from catastrophic flooding. Major floods have occurred in 1978, 2007, 2008, and 2018. In the mid-1970s, Soldiers Grove residents decided on an alternative to the Corps of Engineers' plan to build a levee around the village and undertook the relocation of the community's central business district to higher ground. The relocation was completed several years later, with the business district rebuilt out of reach of flooding and heated largely with passive solar systems. The project became a national model of nonstructural flood control. Soldiers Grove was virtually undamaged by the 2007 flooding that cost well over $60 million in the Kickapoo Valley, and after the 2008 floods, communities are being forced by the Federal Emergency Management Agency (FEMA) to move from their historic locations, requiring even more unwilling residents to relocate. After several years of discussion, a planned relocation of the village began in 2010.

After a record-setting 6–12 inches (15–30 cm) of rainfall at the headwaters of the Kickapoo River, much of the area around the Kickapoo River faced major flooding on August 28–30, 2018. Villages along the Kickapoo were hit by water 7–12 feet (2.1–3.7 m) above flood stage. With a flood stage of 16 feet (4.9 m), Ontario saw the floods crest at 28.5 feet (8.7 m). In Readstown, the flood stage is 11 feet (3.4 m) with the 2018 flood cresting at just over 23 feet (7.0 m). Though the area faced extensive property damage with villages discussing the high cost of flood mitigation projects up to and including the relocation of entire villages, no deaths occurred during or immediately after the flooding.

== Gallery ==
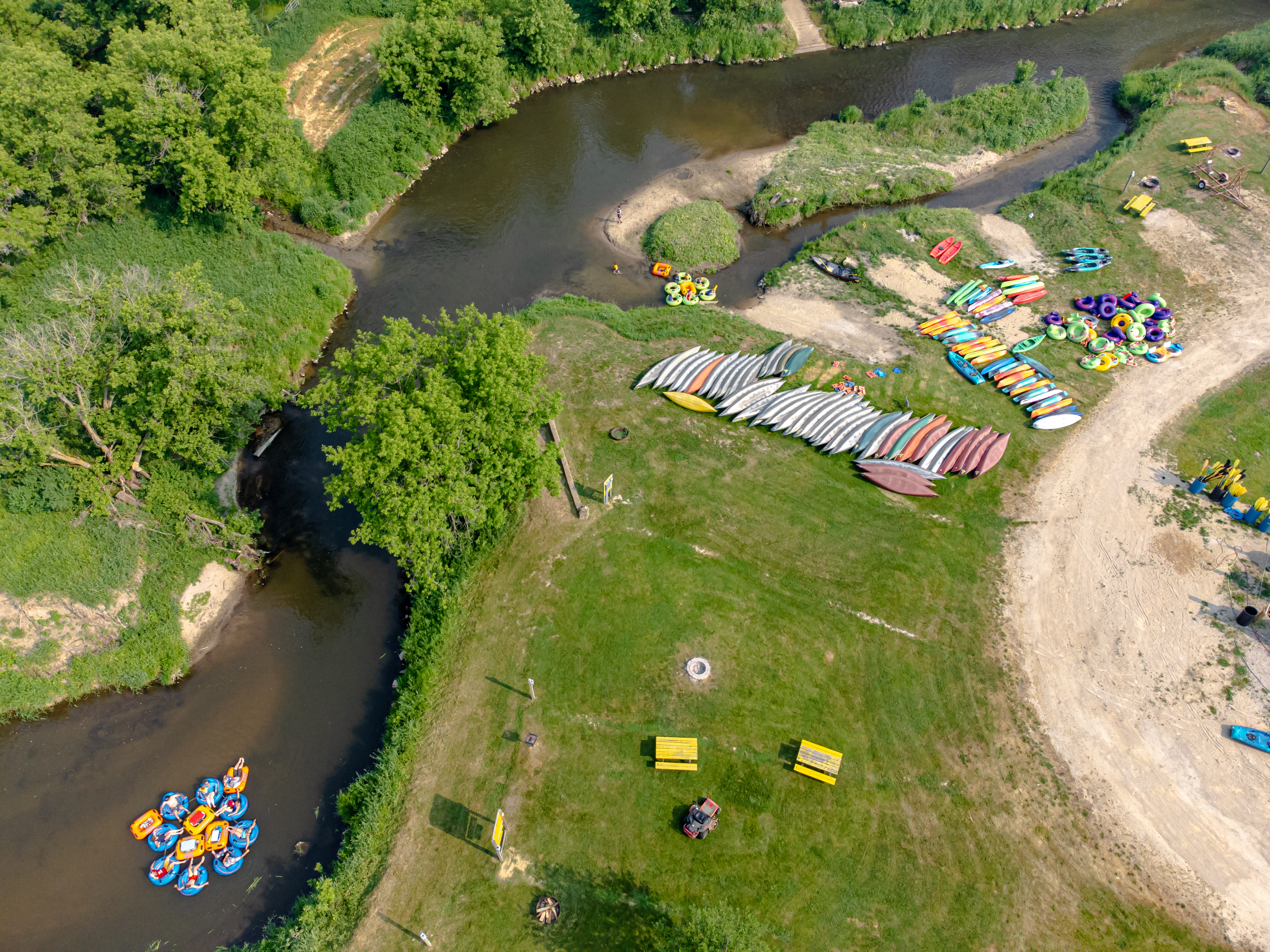
Kickapoo River

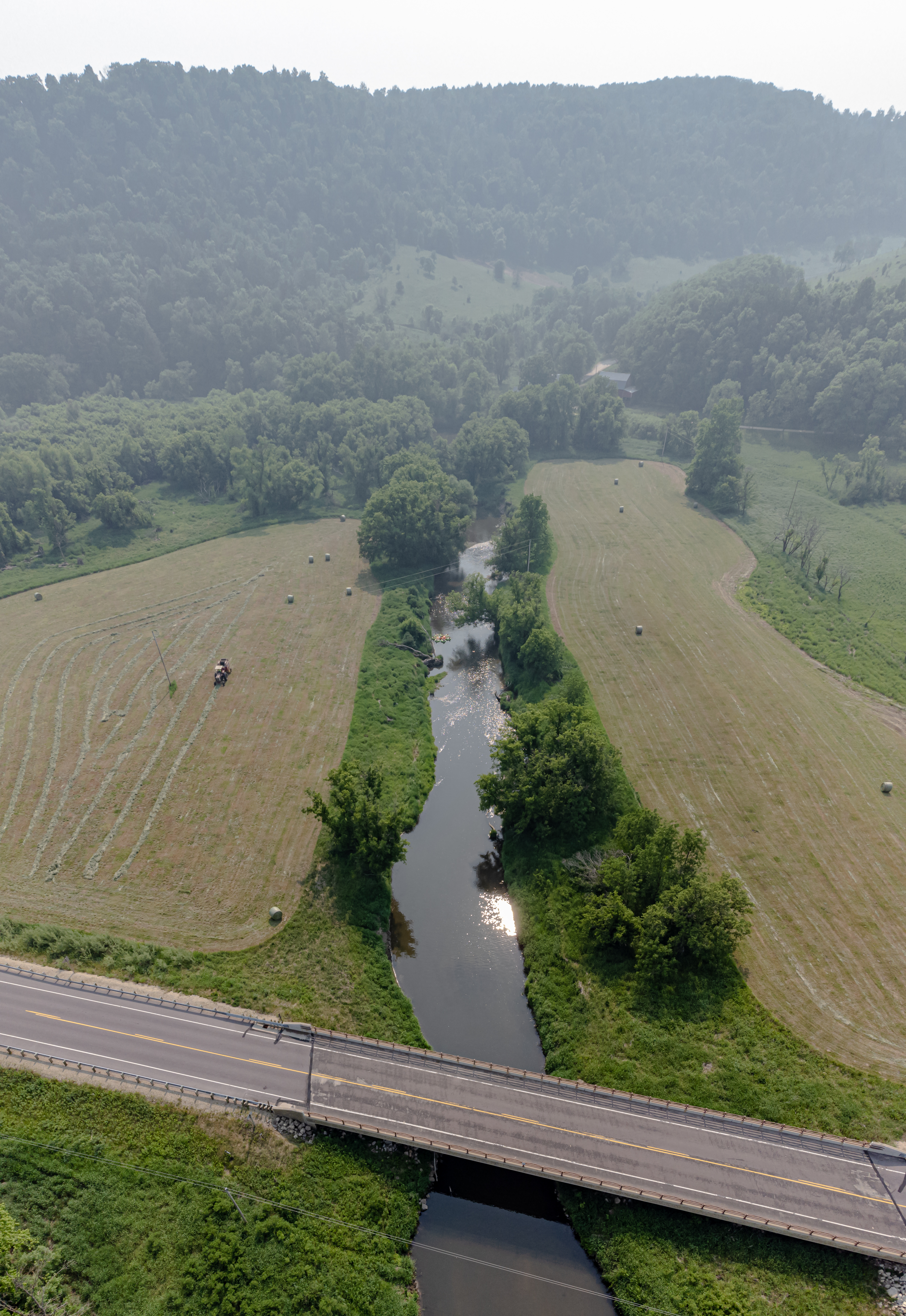

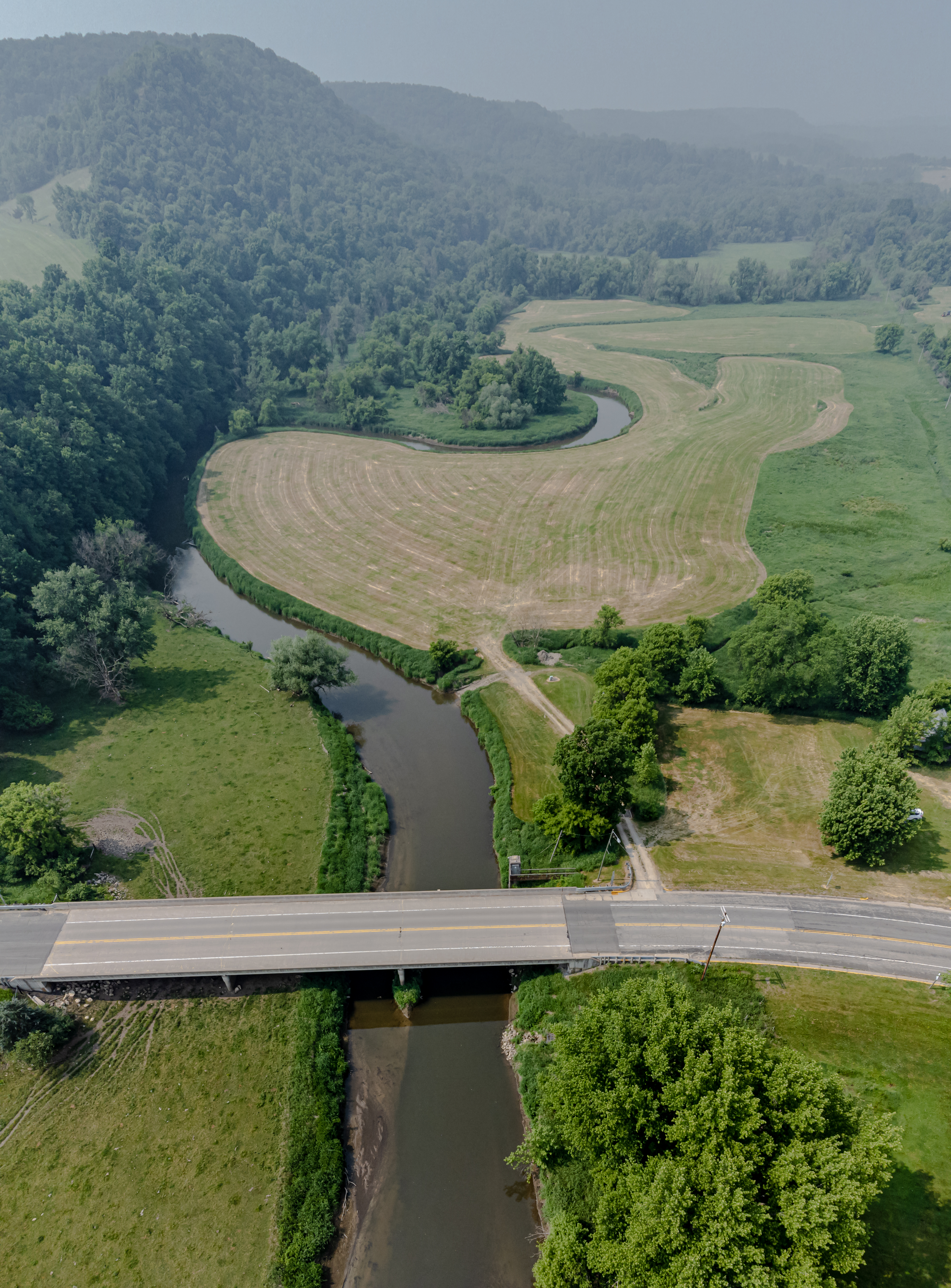
Kickapoo River by La Farge

== See also ==
- List of Wisconsin rivers
- Weister Creek
