= Clinton, Vernon County, Wisconsin =

Clinton, Wisconsin
- Town
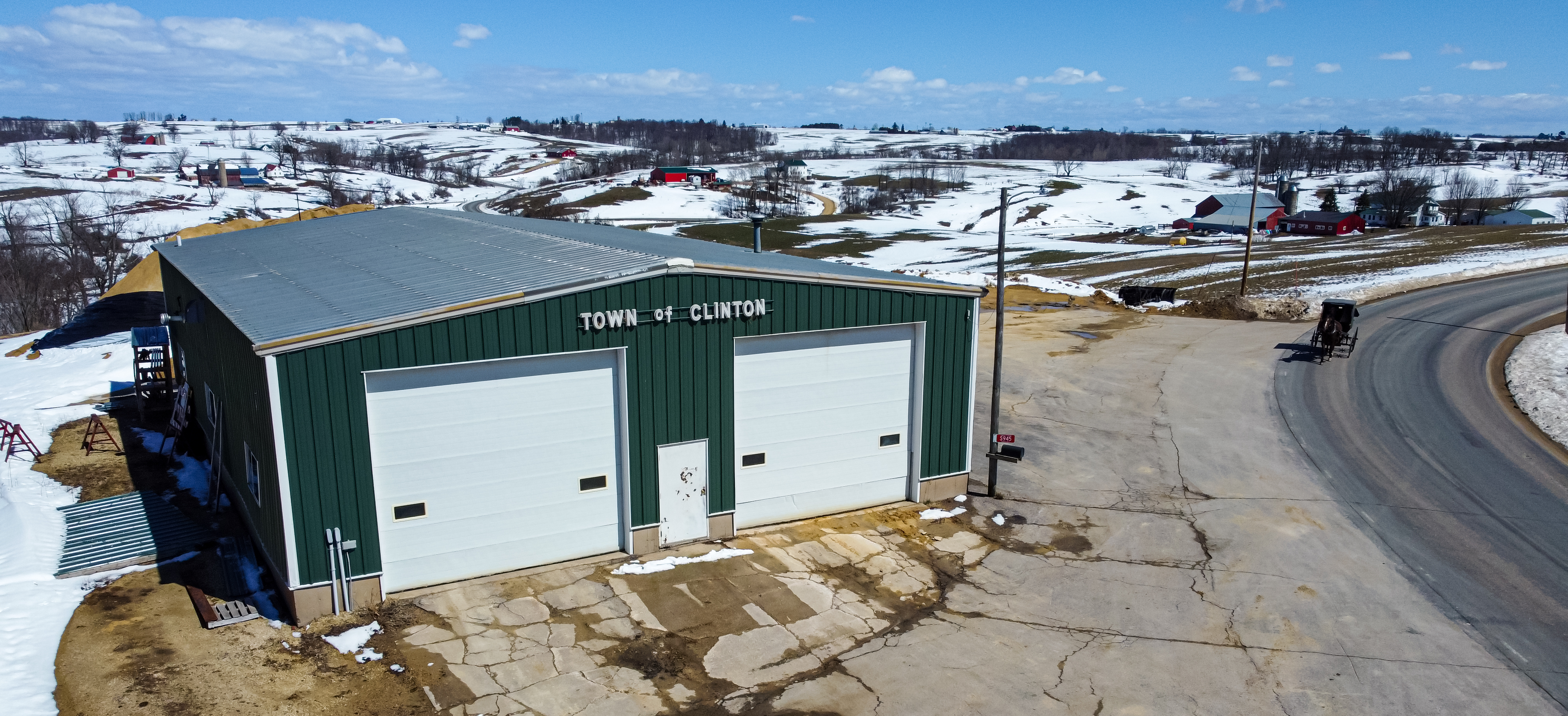

- Location in Vernon County and the state of Wisconsin.
- Coordinates: 43°39′58″N 90°44′40″W
- Country: United States
- State: Wisconsin
- County: Vernon

Area
  - Total: 35.9 sq mi (93.0 km^{2})
  - Land: 35.9 sq mi (92.9 km^{2})
  - Water: 0 sq mi (0.0 km^{2})
- Elevation: 1,260 ft (384 m)

Population (2020)
  - Total: 1,374
  - Density: 38.3/sq mi (14.8/km^{2})
- Time zone: UTC-6 (Central (CST))
  - Summer (DST): UTC-5 (CDT)
- Area code: 608
- FIPS code: 55-15675
- GNIS feature ID: 1582985
- Website: https://tn.clinton.wi.gov/

Clinton is a town in Vernon County in the U.S. state of Wisconsin. The population was 1,374 at the 2020 census. The unincorporated community of Bloomingdale is located partially within the town.

== History ==
The town was originally named "Masterson". It was created in March 1857 from the eastern half of the town of Christiana. The name was changed to "Clinton" in the fall of that year, in honor of New York Governor DeWitt Clinton.

== Geography ==
According to the United States Census Bureau, the town has a total area of 35.9 square miles (93.0 km^{2}), of which 35.9 square miles (92.9 km^{2}) is land and 0.03% is water.

== Demographics ==
As of the census of 2000, there were 1,354 people, 313 households, and 271 families residing in the town. The population density was 37.7 people per square mile (14.6/km^{2}). There were 351 housing units at an average density of 9.8 per square mile (3.8/km^{2}). The racial makeup of the town was 98.89% White, 0.15% Native American, 0.30% Asian, 0.30% from other races, and 0.37% from two or more races, Hispanic, or Latino of any race were 1.26% of the population.

There were 313 households, out of which 53.0% had children under the age of 18 living with them, 77.3% were married couples living together, 4.8% had a female householder with no husband present, and 13.1% were non-families. 11.5% of all households were made up of individuals, and 6.7% had someone living alone who was 65 years of age or older. The average household size was 4.33 and the average family size was 4.76.

In the town, the population was spread out, with 46.9% under the age of 18, 10.3% from 18 to 24, 22.7% from 25 to 44, 12.1% from 45 to 64, and 8.1% who were 65 years of age or older. The median age was 20 years. For every 100 females, there were 110.2 males. For every 100 females age 18 and over, there were 100.8 males.

The median income for a household in the town was $25,417, and the median income for a family was $26,625. Males had a median income of $25,526 versus $18,942 for females. The per capita income for the town was $7,915. About 32.9% of families and 46.2% of the population were below the poverty line, including 63.0% of those under age 18 and 16.5% of those age 65 or over.

== Beaver Controversy ==
Recently a movement called "Save Taryn's Beaver" was launched to save a family of beavers on upper Weister Creek. The beaver is a keystone species, increasing trout and bird biodiversity in its territory through creation of beaver ponds and wetlands. Options to manage the problem include beaver relocation, killing or installation of Flow devices to regulate pond height. The town of Clinton, Wisconsin is holding hearings to decide the fate of the Weister Creek beavers on May 12, 2010. At the first hearing, May 12, 70 citizens showed up and it was standing room only in a debate between those who wanted to protect the beavers versus those who feared further road damage or loss of pastureland to wetland. Bill Quackenbush, a representative of the Ho Chunk Tribal Nation, suggested that the Vernon County Board, which recently was awarded $1.2 million in funds from the Ho Chunk Nation to use on county projects, help defray the cost of installation of fencing and flow devices to lower the height of the beaver dam and protect Dell Road. The next hearing will be May 26.

== See also ==
- Driftless Area

== Gallery ==
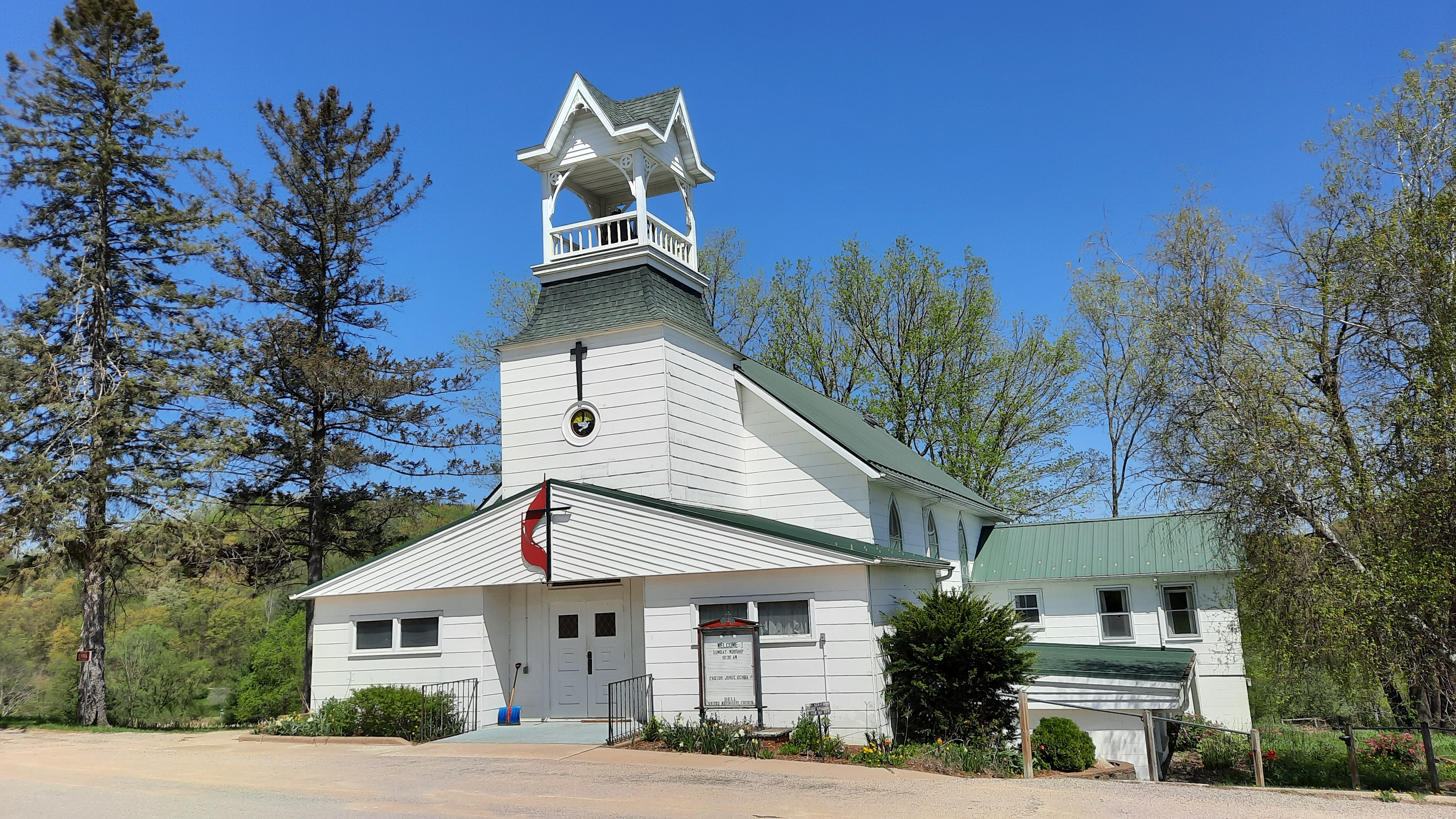
Dell United Methodist Church in Dell, WI

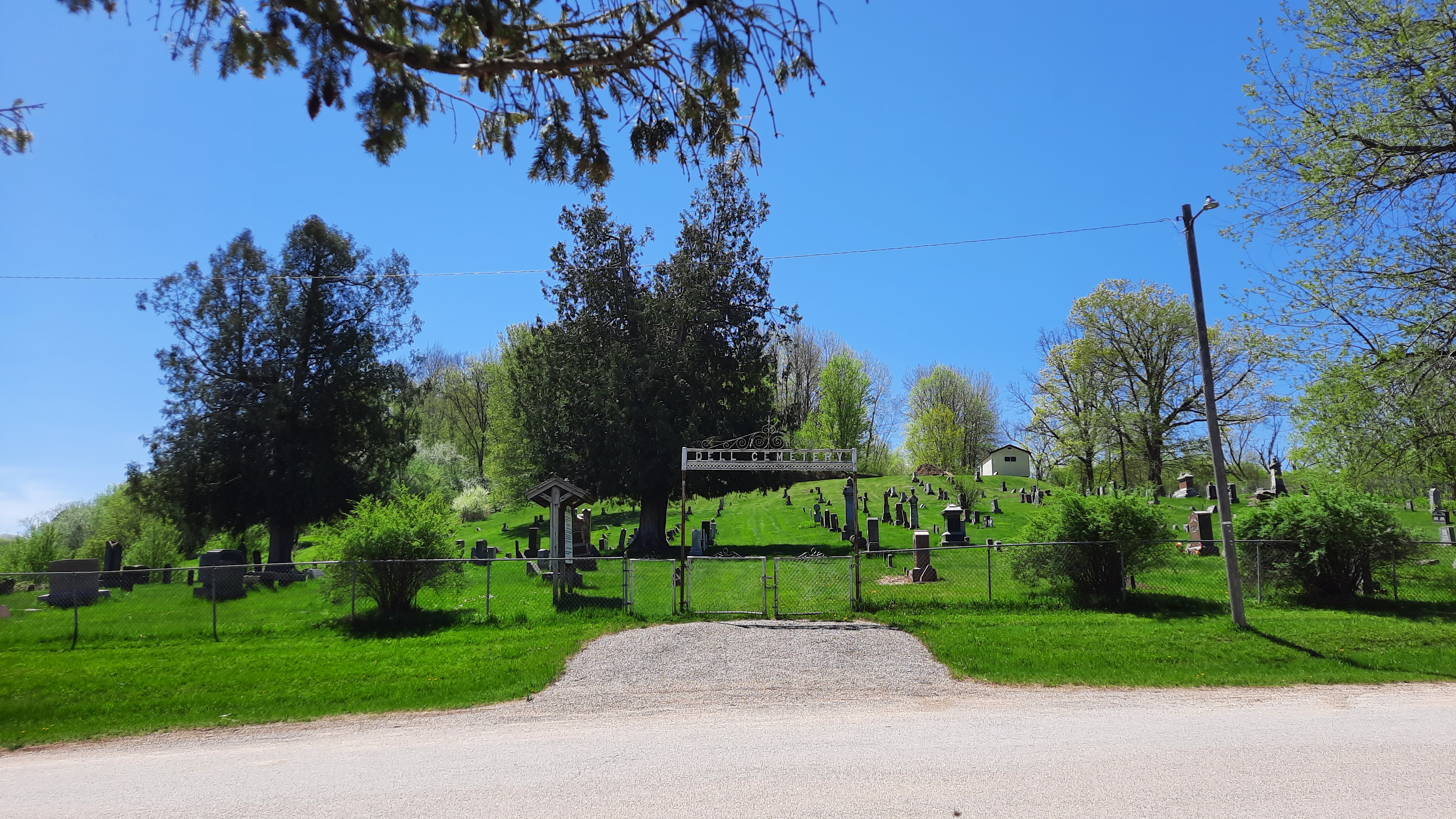
Dell Cemetery in Dell, WI
