= 1899 New Richmond tornado =

Severe windstorm in Wisconsin, United States

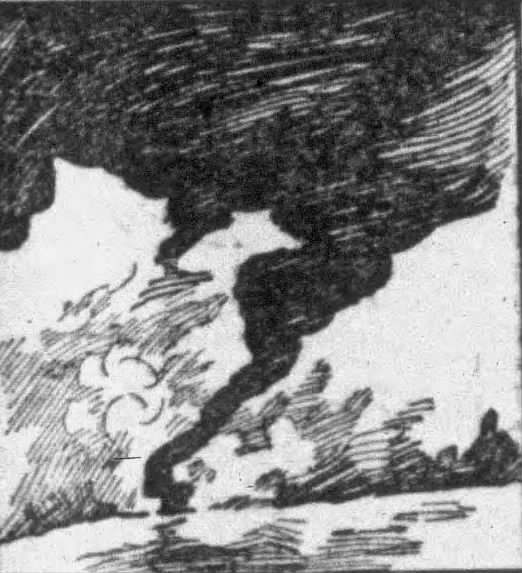
- An eyewitness depiction of the tornado, depicting it as a dusty drill-bit

Meteorological history
- Formed: June 12, 1899, 6:00 PM CST

F5 tornado
- on the Fujita scale
- Highest winds: >261 mph (420 km/h)

Overall effects
- Fatalities: 117
- Injuries: 150
- Damage: $300,000 ($11.6 million in 2025 dollars)
- Areas affected: West-central Wisconsin

The 1899 New Richmond tornado was an estimated F5 tornado that formed in the early evening of Monday, June 12, 1899, leaving a 45-mile-long (72 km) path of destruction through St. Croix, Polk, and Barron counties in west-central Wisconsin. There were a total of 117 fatalities and 150 injuries, with hundreds more reported as displaced. The worst devastation occurred in the city of New Richmond, which took a direct hit from the storm. Over half of New Richmond was left in ruins due to the tornado, which also caused minor damage to surrounding communities. The damage was reported to be over $300,000 (USD) ($11,610,000 in 2025). As of 2019, it is ranked as the ninth deadliest tornado in United States history, as well as the deadliest tornado ever recorded in Wisconsin.

== Event description ==
On June 12, 1899, the Gollmar Brothers Circus drew hundreds of visitors to New Richmond, Wisconsin, a town with around 2,000 residents. At around 3:00 PM, clouds began to build, and the sky darkened. As the circus ended for the day at around 4:30 PM, a heavy rain with some hail began to fall. The rain let up at around 5:00 PM and people began to head home for the day. By 6:00 PM, the streets of New Richmond were full of tourists, travelers, and residents.

At around 5:30 PM, the tornado was reported to have first touched down about five miles south of Hudson, on the eastern bank of Lake St. Croix. The tornado was described as a boiling cloud, and was reported to have skirted the hills to the east of Lake St. Croix before moving off to the northeast. Passing clear of Hudson and following both the Willow River and the Omaha Railroad, the tornado destroyed several farms near the rural communities of Burkhardt and Boardman as it traveled northeast. In Boardman, there were four deaths reported. The first reported casualty was Kate Heffron, a 55-year-old woman that lost her life when the tornado destroyed her home and farm. The home and farm of 70-year-old Louisa Hurd also sustained a direct hit; Hurd and 13-year-old Gertie Wears were both killed as the home was destroyed. Wears had stopped in with her father and brother to visit, both of whom managed to reach the cellar before the storm hit. John Neitge, a young farmer from Deer Park who had been driving with his fiancée, also stopped at the Hurd farm to seek shelter from the storm. He was struck and killed by flying debris, while his fiancée was uninjured.

After leaving New Richmond, the tornado moved toward the northeast, along a course almost parallel to the Omaha Railroad line. Most of its destruction after that point was confined to rural areas, with only two fatalities occurring north of the town. The tornado struck several farms in the Stanton area, and passed barely a mile north of the village of Deer Park before crossing into Polk County. It came within 2 mi (3.2 km) of the village of Clear Lake, frightening residents who had experienced a similar tornado in September 1884. A large number of farms in the area suffered considerable damage, and many families were left homeless. One farmer, Sam Olson, was killed instantly when the tornado leveled his farmstead, leaving his wife and son seriously injured.

Northeast of Clear Lake, the tornado swept through the logging community of Pineville, where another farmer, Michael Kennetz, was killed when his home was swept away. A 10-mile-long (16 km) swath of F2 damage occurred in the Deer Park–Clear Lake area. Several homes and farms in the vicinity of the hamlet of Richardson and the village of Clayton were blown away. The storm continued east into Barron County, where it hit the farming community of Arland. Almost the entire settlement was demolished but no fatalities or serious injuries were reported. The tornado dissipated a few miles southwest of Barron, although the storm was still strong enough to cause considerable damage to the town.

== Aftermath ==
The storm had blown down telegraph lines in the immediate area, so survivors went on horseback to Roberts, ten miles to the south, to send messages into St. Paul with news of the tornado. The first relief trains with supplies, physicians, and nurses arrived from Chippewa Falls and Stevens Point around midnight. The following morning, another train with telegraph operators, lineworkers, and more healthcare professionals arrived in New Richmond from St. Paul.

Altogether, the tornado and the subsequent fires that burned throughout the following night destroyed the entire business district along with more than half the residences in the town, with total damage adding up to over 300 buildings. The only significant surviving structures were the Lumber and Roller Mills located on the banks of the Willow River, the town's public school, and the Catholic Church, which acted as either makeshift shelters or morgues. Only some northwestern and southeastern portions of the city were spared. The town's electrical plant and water facilities were destroyed, so there was no way to counter the fires burning through the debris. Many bodies found in the aftermath of the tornado were burnt beyond recognition—it was impossible to tell if they died from the tornado or from being trapped and burned alive.

In the days following the tornado, the list of those killed in the tornado gradually grew as several injured people died in various St. Paul hospitals. On June 22, 57-year-old Ward Gould died from complications caused by internal injuries sustained in the storm, bringing the official death toll to 117, including four victims who were never identified. 66 were residents of New Richmond, another 31 had resided in the adjacent townships of Richmond, Stanton and Erin Prairie, and the remainder were mostly from other communities nearby, such as Hudson, Stillwater, and Star Prairie. Among the dead were 26 children under the age of 16, including a 10-year-old boy whose body was never found.

Following an analysis and damage survey of the New Richmond tornado, B. F. Groat and Peter Christianson, mechanical engineering professors at the University of Minnesota, published a formula to show the relation between a tornado's pressure and a tornado's wind speed velocity: $P$ = 0.005$V$^{2}. Using this formula, they determined the tornado had a minimum wind speed of 134 miles per hour (216 km/h), marking the first time a tornado's wind speed was able to be estimated using forensic engineering methods.

The town was damaged so severely that it essentially had to be rebuilt completely. Damage claims exceeded $300,000 ($7 million in 2006), however, damages may have been as high as $600,000 ($14 million in 2006).

== Historical significance ==
The tornado that struck New Richmond is estimated to be an F5 on the original Fujita scale, and would today be categorized an EF5 on the Enhanced Fujita scale, with winds in excess of 200 miles per hour, making it the third of only six F5 tornadoes ever recorded in Wisconsin. Surveys of the damage in New Richmond and elsewhere determined the tornado had a damage path of roughly 400–500 yards, or slightly over a quarter-mile in width.

As of 2019, the New Richmond tornado was ranked as the ninth deadliest tornado in United States history. At the time of its occurrence, it was the third deadliest tornado in American history, ranked only by the 1840 Great Natchez Tornado and the 1896 St. Louis-East St. Louis tornado.

According to the research compiled by meteorologist and tornado expert Thomas P. Grazulis, the New Richmond Tornado was the first estimated F5/EF5 in American history to cause a death toll exceeding 100. The rating for the Natchez tornado has never been officially determined (though is likely at least an F4 tornado) and the St. Louis–East St. Louis tornado ranked only as an F4. In addition, the 1908 Dixie tornado outbreak and 1936 Gainesville tornado have also both been classified as F4 tornadoes.

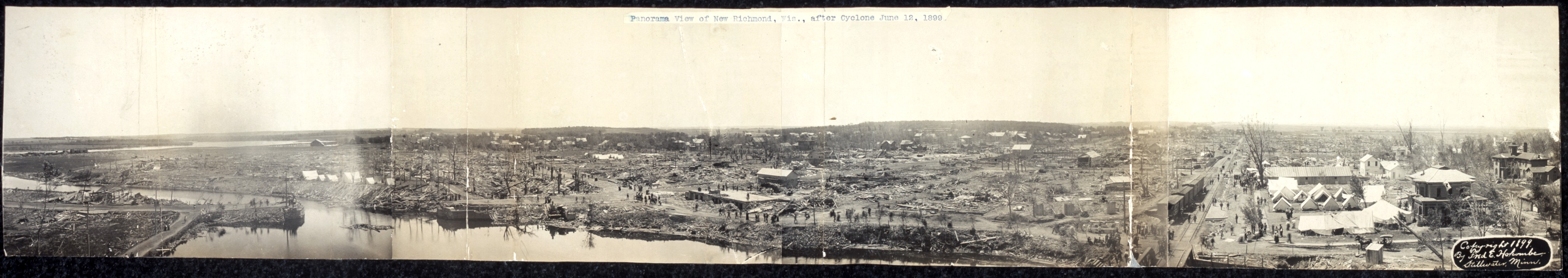
Panoramic view of the damage

== See also ==
- List of F5 and EF5 tornadoes
