= U.S. Route 63 in Wisconsin =

Segment of U.S. Highway in Wisconsin

U.S. Highway 63
- US 63 highlighted in red

Route information
- Maintained by WisDOT
- Length: 182.2 mi (293.2 km)
- Existed: 1934–present

Major junctions
- South end: US 63 at the Mississippi River in Red Wing
- WIS 35 in Hager City; US 10 in Ellsworth; I-94 in Baldwin; US 12 in Baldwin; US 8 in Turtle Lake; US 53 north of Spooner
- North end: US 2 in Bayfield County

Location
- Country: United States
- State: Wisconsin
- Counties: Pierce, St. Croix, Polk, Barron, Washburn, Sawyer, Bayfield

Highway system
- United States Numbered Highway System; List; Special; Divided; Wisconsin State Trunk Highway System; Interstate; US; State; Scenic; Rustic
← WIS 62	→ WIS 64

U.S. Highway 63 (US 63) is a north–south highway in northwestern Wisconsin, traveling from Red Wing, Minnesota, to its national northern terminus 10 miles (16 km) west of Ashland, Wisconsin.

== Route description ==
US 63 crosses the Mississippi River via the Red Wing Bridge, situated north of Red Wing, Minnesota. Entering Wisconsin, it meets Wisconsin Highway 35 (WIS 35) at a four-way stop in Hager City. The route continues north for 9.1 miles (14.6 km) until it intersects with US 10 outside Ellsworth. US 63 and US 10 then run concurrently eastward into Ellsworth's downtown area, where they encounter the southern end of WIS 65. On the eastern side of Ellsworth, US 10 branches off to the southeast, while US 63 turns north at the nearby WIS 72. East of Martell, US 63 briefly overlaps with WIS 29 for a mile. WIS 29 then heads west, and US 63 proceeds into St. Croix County.

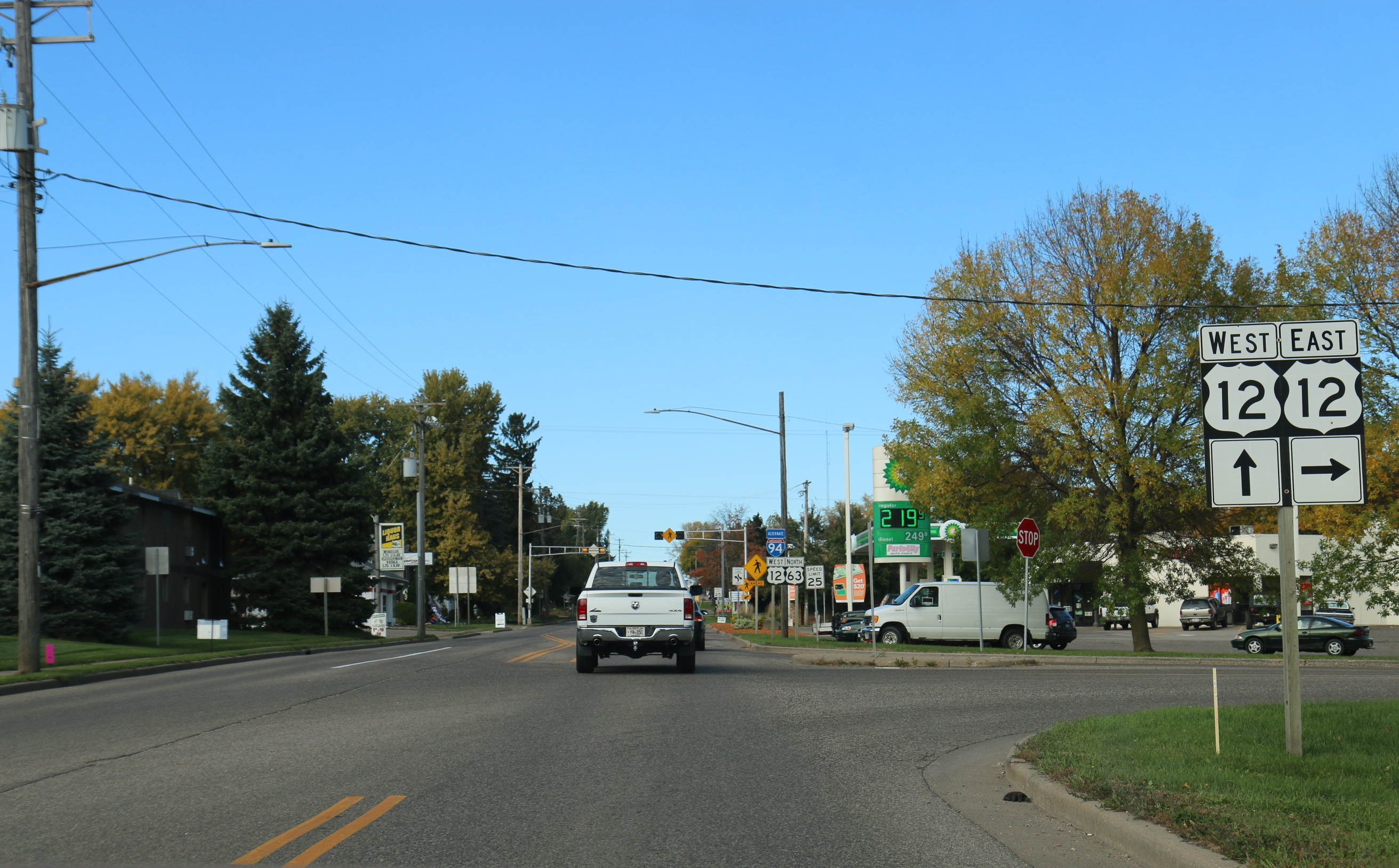
US 63 running concurrently along US 12 in Baldwin

In the Baldwin area, US 63 crosses over Interstate 94 (I-94) and intersects with US 12 in downtown Baldwin. Heading north from Baldwin, US 63 continues for 11 miles (18 km) before reaching a roundabout near Cylon. At this roundabout, it intersects with WIS 46 and briefly runs concurrently with WIS 64. US 63/WIS 64 runs for nearly five miles (8.0 km) before US 63 turns northward separately and enters Polk County. US 63 traverses through several towns in Polk County, including Clear Lake, Richardson, and Clayton. It then intersects with US 8 on the western side of Turtle Lake, sharing a route with US 8 as they enter the Barron County section of Turtle Lake. At a roundabout, US 63 splits from US 8 and heads northeasterly toward Comstock. Continuing its journey, US 63 intersects with WIS 48 in Cumberland and passes through Barronett before exiting Barron County and entering Washburn County.

US 63 traverses Washburn County, passing through its county seat, Shell Lake, seven miles (11 km) northeast of its entry point. The highway continues northeast towards Spooner, intersecting with WIS 253 and WIS 70. It briefly merges with the US 53 expressway northeast of downtown Spooner, heading towards Trego. From Trego, US 63 proceeds northeastward towards Hayward and Ashland, passing through Earl, Springbrook, and south of Stanberry before entering Sawyer County. In Hayward, it intersects with WIS 27 and WIS 77. Continuing northeast towards Ashland, US 63 passes through Seeley. Entering Bayfield County, the highway passes through Cable, south of Drummond, through Grand View, and east of Mason. It intersects with the western end of WIS 118 before terminating at US 2, having covered 34.8 miles (56.0 km) within Bayfield County.

== History ==
With the creation of the United States Numbered Highway System in 1926, US 63, as a whole, only served as far north as Des Moines, Iowa. At the same time, a connection between Red Wing, and Ashland comprised a portion of WIS 46 south of Cylon and almost the entire portion of WIS 24 north of Cylon. In 1934, US 63 was extended north from Oskaloosa, Iowa, to Ashland; its direct connection to Des Moines was replaced with the short-lived designation US 163. In Wisconsin, the extension replaced WIS 24.

== Major intersections ==
County	Location	mi	km	Destinations	Notes
Mississippi River		0.0	0.0	US 63 south to US 61 / MN 58	Continuation into Minnesota
Mississippi River		0.0	0.0	Red Wing Bridge	
Pierce	Town of Trenton	2.6	4.2	WIS 35 / Great River Road – Red Wing Airport, Nelson, Bay City, Prescott	
Pierce	Town of Trimbelle	11.5	18.5	US 10 west – Prescott	Western end of US 10 concurrency
Pierce	Ellsworth	13.1	21.1	WIS 65 north (Maple Street) – River Falls	Southern terminus of WIS 65
Pierce	Town of Ellsworth	14.8	23.8	US 10 east – Durand WIS 72 east – Elmwood	Eastern end of US 10 concurrency; western terminus of WIS 72; western end of WIS 72 concurrency
Pierce	Town of Ellsworth	16.4	26.4	WIS 72 east – Elmwood	Eastern end of WIS 72 concurrency
Pierce	Martell–Gilman town line	24.9	40.1	WIS 29 east – Spring Valley, Crystal Cave	Southern end of WIS 29 concurrency
Pierce	Martell–Gilman town line	25.9	41.7	WIS 29 west – River Falls; 850th Avenue east	Northern end of WIS 29 concurrency
St. Croix	Baldwin	32.0	51.5	I-94 – Eau Claire, St. Paul	Exit 19 on I-94
St. Croix	Baldwin	34.2	55.0	US 12 east – Woodville	Southern end of US 12 concurrency
St. Croix	Baldwin	34.8	56.0	US 12 west – Hammond, Hudson; 8th Avenue east	Northern end of US 12 concurrency
St. Croix	Stanton–Cylon town line	45.9	73.9	WIS 64 west – New Richmond WIS 46 north – Amery	Western end of WIS 64 concurrency; southern terminus of WIS 46
St. Croix	Town of Cylon	50.8	81.8	WIS 64 east – Connorsville; 260th Street south	Eastern end of WIS 64 concurrency
Polk	Turtle Lake	71.2	114.6	US 8 west – St. Croix Falls CTH-T north	Western end of US 8 concurrency
Barron	Turtle Lake	72.4	116.5	US 8 east – Barron; Maple Street south	Eastern end of US 8 concurrency
Barron	Cumberland	83.3	134.1	WIS 48 west – Luck	Western end of WIS 48 concurrency
Barron	Cumberland	84.4	135.8	WIS 48 east – Rice Lake; 2nd Avenue south	Eastern end of WIS 48 concurrency
Washburn	Town of Spooner	106.0	170.6	WIS 253 south to US 53 south – Rice Lake	Northern terminus of WIS 253
Washburn	Spooner	107.0	172.2	WIS 70 (Maple Street) – Couderay, Siren	
Washburn	Town of Spooner	109.9	176.9	US 53 south – Rice Lake	Southern end of US 53 concurrency; exit 168 on US 53
Washburn	Town of Trego	113.4	182.5	US 53 north – Superior CTH-E west	Northern end of US 53 concurrency; exit 172 on US 53
Sawyer	Hayward	134.1	215.8	WIS 27 south – Radisson; Dakota Avenue	Southwestern end of WIS 27 concurrency
Sawyer	Hayward	134.7	216.8	WIS 27 north / WIS 77 – Clam Lake, Mellen, Brule, Minong	Northeastern end of WIS 27 concurrency
Bayfield	Mason–Kelly–Keystone–Eileen town quadri-point	179.5	288.9	WIS 118 east – Marengo CTH-F west – Benoit	Western terminus of WIS 118
Bayfield	Keystone–Eileen town line	182.2	293.2	US 2 – Ashland, Superior	National northern terminus of US 63
1.000 mi = 1.609 km; 1.000 km = 0.621 mi: Concurrency terminus
