= Wisconsin Highway 64 =

Highway in Wisconsin

State Trunk Highway 64
- WIS 64; mainline in red, business routes in blue

Route information
- Maintained by WisDOT
- Length: 275.65 mi (443.62 km)

Major junctions
- West end: MN 36 in St. Joseph
- US 63 / WIS 46 in Deer Park; US 53 in Bloomer; US 51 in Merrill; US 45 / WIS 47 / WIS 52 in Antigo; US 141 in Pound
- East end: US 41 / LMCT in Marinette

Location
- Country: United States
- State: Wisconsin
- Counties: St. Croix, Dunn, Chippewa, Taylor, Lincoln, Langlade, Oconto, Marinette

Highway system
- Wisconsin State Trunk Highway System; Interstate; US; State; Scenic; Rustic
← WIS 63	→ WIS 65

State Trunk Highway 64 (WIS 64) is a 275.65-mile-long (443.62 km) highway in Wisconsin, which runs from the St. Croix Crossing bridge as a continuation of Minnesota State Highway 36 (MN 36) near Stillwater, Minnesota, and continues east to its eastern terminus in downtown Marinette, where it terminates at US Highway 41 (US 41) at an intersection on the corner of Marinette and Hall Avenue. Along the way, Highway 64 runs east–west through eight counties across northern Wisconsin.

== Route description ==
=== State line to Bloomer ===
WIS 64 begins at the St. Croix Crossing bridge at the Wisconsin–Minnesota state line. The highway continues as a four–lane freeway bypassing Houlton for approximately a mile, before meeting and running concurrently with WIS 35 for nine miles (14 km) until Somerset. WI 64 is a limited-access freeway from 150th Avenue in Houlton until 85th Street and Raleigh Road in Somerset. Continuing east, the highway is an expressway with at-grade intersections until 145th Street in New Richmond. From 145th Street on, the route is a two-lane surface road. In Cylon, Wisconsin WIS 64 runs concurrently with US 63 from the US 63/WIS 46 (known locally as 'Four Corners') junction until 260th Street.

WSI 64 winds through Dunn County, running through mostly rural areas and unincorporated towns. Approximately half-way through its routing in the County, WIS 64 runs concurrently with Wisconsin Highway 25. After passing the Hay Creek Public Hunting Grounds, WIS 64 crosses the Red Cedar River before crossing into Chippewa County. Highway 64 continues east through Chippewa County, crossing US 53 at exit 112, just north of Bloomer.

=== Bloomer to Antigo ===
WIS 64 runs concurrently with WIS 40 for about four miles (6.4 km) before WIS 40 turns north towards US 8. Just south of Cornell, WIS 64 meets the northern terminus of WIS 178 before crossing the Chippewa River and into Cornell as Bridge Street.

In downtown Cornell, WIS 64 intersects with WIS 27 at South 3rd Street. The two state highways run concurrently out of the city to the Cornell Municipal Airport. WIS 27 turns north towards Ladysmith, while WIS 64 continues east into Taylor County.

WIS 64 becomes Main Street in Gilman, intersecting with IWS 73 east of the village. WIS 64 and WIS 73 continue south across the Yellow River before WIS 73 continues south towards Thorp. WIS 64 runs along the southern border of Chequamegon National Forest en route to Medford, where it becomes Broadway Avenue. WIS 64 then crosses WIS 13 at 8th Street on the east side of the city. Outside of the unincorporated town of Goodrich, WIS 64 meets the northern terminus of WIS 97 (Mink Drive). WIS 64 continues slightly northwest into Goodrich before entering Lincoln County. WIS 64 continues on for about 10 miles (16 km) before intersecting WIS 107. WIS 64 and WIS 107 continue north for two miles (3.2 km) before turning east and into the city of Merrill, where they become Main Street.

WIS 64 and WIS 107 run alongside the Wisconsin River, crossing it on the west side of Merrill before WIS 107 continues northwest on Grand Avenue. WIS 64 continues east across the Prairie River as 1st Street into downtown. At North Polk Street, WIS 64 splits into two one-way streets; eastbound traffic continues for about seven blocks on East 1st Street, while westbound traffic takes East 2nd Street past the post office, Prairie River Middle School, and on to North Polk Street. Two blocks east of the Lincoln County Courthouse at Center Avenue (also known as County Highway K), WIS 64 turns south for one block and back to East Main Street. It then continues east out of the city to US 51 at exit 208.

East of the US 51 freeway, WIS 64 crosses the southern terminus of WIS 17, then heads east towards Langlade County. WIS 64 takes a brief two-mile (3.2 km) turn south with County Highway X before crossing the county line.

WIS 64 continues east towards the city of Antigo. A new detour opened in the fall of 2011 that now has WIS 64 bypassing downtown Antigo. It crosses US 45 and WIS 47, and merges with WIS 53 on the north side of Antigo. WIS 52 and 64 continue east while US 45 and WIS 47 continue north.

=== Antigo to Marinette ===
About a mile (1.6 km) outside of Antigo, WIS 52 turns northeast at Langlade Road, just north of Langlade County Airport. WIS 64 continues due east, going through the towns of Polar, Elton, White Lake, and Langlade. WIS 64 then enters the western boundary of the Nicolet National Forest before entering Oconto County.

WIS 64 continues through the wooded hills of the national forest before intersecting with WIS 32. The two highways turn to the southeast along the Oconto River into the town of Mountain. After passing Chute Pond Park, WIS 32 turns toward the south towards Breed while WIS 64 heads east along the southern edge of the National Forest into Marinette County.

WIS 64 is the county line between Oconto and Marinette for 3.5 miles (5.6 km) before entering Marinette County. On the northern edge of the city of Pound, WIS 64 intersects with US 141 before continuing east toward the city of Marinette. Upon entering Marinette, WIS 64 becomes Hall Avenue, continuing downtown until it reaches its eastern terminus at US 41 (Marinette Avenue) at State Street. US 41 continues east on Hall Avenue to Bridge Street and into the state of Michigan.

== History ==
Initially, WIS 64 ran from WIS 38 (now US 141) in Pound to WIS 15 (now US 41) in Marinette. During the early 1920s, WIS 64 gradually extended westward all the way to Minnesota. Most parts of the route followed its present-day alignment. In 1926, a part of WIS 64 from Mountain to Pound was rerouted northward.

A project expanding 15 miles of WIS 64 between Houlton and New Richmond was completed in 2006 at a cost of $109 million. Based on faulty traffic projections, this project was included in WisPIRGs list of highway boondoggles.

In August 2017, the westernmost part of WIS 64 moved southward in favor of moving from the old Stillwater Lift Bridge to the new St. Croix Crossing.

== Major intersections ==
County	Location	mi	km	Destinations	Notes
St. Croix River		0.0	0.0	MN 36 west – Stillwater	Continuation into Minnesota
St. Croix River		0.0	0.0	St. Croix Crossing	
St. Croix	Town of St. Joseph	0.4	0.64	WIS 35 south – Houlton, Hudson	Southern end of WIS 35 concurrency
St. Croix	Somerset	9.8	15.8	WIS 35 north – Somerset, Osceola	Northern end of WIS 35 concurrency
St. Croix	New Richmond	16.0	25.7	WIS 65 – Star Prairie, Downtown	
St. Croix	Town of Cylon	23.3	37.5	US 63 south / WIS 46 north – Deer Park, Amery, Baldwin	Southern end of US 63 concurrency
St. Croix	Town of Forest	28.3	45.5	US 63 north – Clear Lake	Northern end of US 63 concurrency
St. Croix	Town of Forest	32.3	52.0	WIS 128 south – Glenwood City	
Dunn	Connorsville	37.6	60.5	WIS 79 south – Boyceville	
Dunn	Town of Sheridan	47.3	76.1	WIS 25 south – Wheeler	Southern end of WIS 25 concurrency
Dunn	Town of Wilson	48.3	77.7	WIS 25 north – Ridgeland	Northern end of WIS 25 concurrency
Chippewa	Town of Bloomer	67.0	107.8	US 53 – Superior, Eau Claire	
Chippewa	Town of Bloomer	69.2	111.4	WIS 40 south – Bloomer	Southern end of WIS 40 concurrency
Chippewa	Town of Bloomer	71.1	114.4	WIS 40 north – Bruce	Northern end of WIS 40 concurrency
Chippewa	Town of Bloomer	74.1	119.3	WIS 124 south – Chippewa Falls	
Chippewa	Cornell	86.7	139.5	WIS 178 south – Chippewa Falls	
Chippewa	Cornell	88.1	141.8	WIS 27 south – Cadott	Southern end of WIS 27 concurrency
Chippewa	Town of Estella	89.8	144.5	WIS 27 north – Ladysmith	Northern end of WIS 27 concurrency
Taylor	Town of Ford	106.1	170.8	WIS 73 north – Ingram	Northern end of WIS 73 concurrency
Taylor	Town of Ford	109.4	176.1	WIS 73 south – Thorp	Southern end of WIS 73 concurrency
Taylor	Medford	132.2	212.8	WIS 13 – Ashland, Marshfield	
Taylor	Town of Goodrich	143.4	230.8	WIS 97 south – Athens	
Lincoln				WIS 107 south – Marathon City	Western end of WIS 107 concurrency
Lincoln	Merrill			WIS 107 north – Tomahawk	Eastern end of WIS 107 concurrency
Lincoln				US 51 – Minocqua, Wausau	
Lincoln				WIS 17 north – Rhinelander, Eagle River	Southern terminus of WIS 17
Langlade	Antigo			US 45 / WIS 47 / WIS 52 west – Monico, Wittenberg	Western end of WIS 52 concurrency
Langlade				WIS 52 east – Lily	Eastern end of WIS 52 concurrency
Langlade	Langlade			WIS 55 – Pickerel, Mole Lake, Crandon, Keshena, Shawano	
Oconto				WIS 32 north – Lakewood, Laona	Western end of WIS 32 concurrency
Oconto				WIS 32 south – Suring, Green Bay	Eastern end of WIS 32 concurrency
Marinette	Pound			Bus. US 141 south – Pound, Coleman	Western end of Bus. US 141 concurrency
Marinette				US 141 – Iron Mountain, Green Bay Bus. US 141 ends	Eastern end of Bus. US 141 concurrency; eastern terminus of Bus. US 141 concurrency
Marinette	Marinette			WIS 180 north – Wausaukee	Southern terminus of WIS 180
Marinette	Marinette			US 41 / LMCT – Menominee, Escanaba, Green Bay	Eastern terminus of WIS 64
1.000 mi = 1.609 km; 1.000 km = 0.621 mi: Concurrency terminus; Incomplete access

== Special routes ==
=== Somerset business loop ===
Business State Trunk Highway 64
- Location: Somerset, Wisconsin
- Length: 3.9 mi (6.3 km)

Business State Trunk Highway 64 (Bus. WIS 64) is a business loop of WIS 64, running through downtown Somerset.

=== New Richmond business spur ===
Business State Trunk Highway 64
- Location: New Richmond, Wisconsin
- Length: 2.7 mi (4.3 km)

Business State Trunk Highway 64 (Bus. WIS 64) is a business spur of WIS 64, running through downtown New Richmond.
