= Willow River (St. Croix River tributary) =

River in Wisconsin, United States

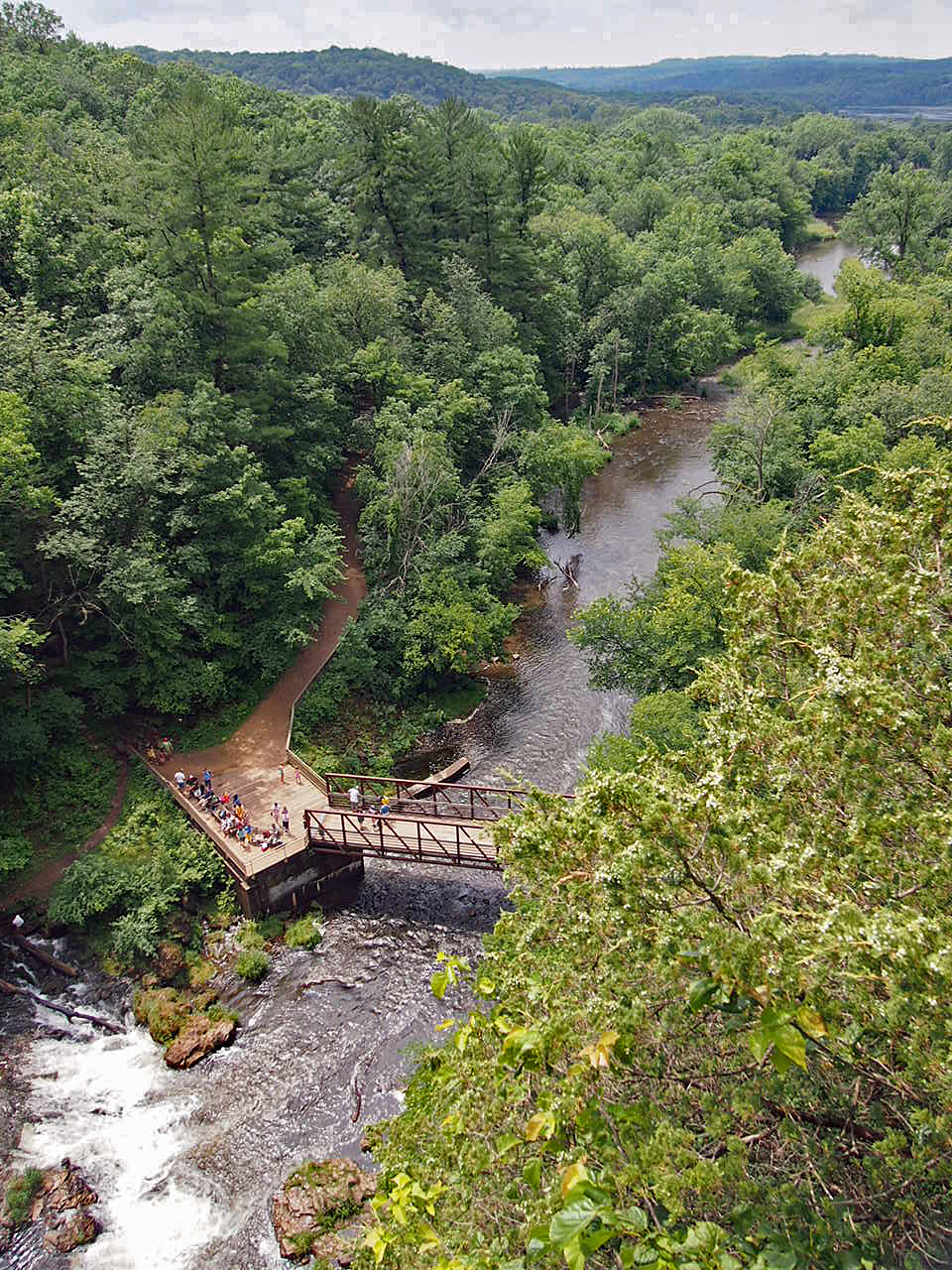
The lower reaches of the Willow River in Willow River State Park

The Willow River is a 61.1-mile-long (98.3 km) river in St. Croix County, Wisconsin, United States, and a tributary of the St. Croix River. Its source is in southern Polk County east of the village of Clear Lake. The river at one time flowed unobstructed into the lower St. Croix River between Hudson and North Hudson (44°59′18″N 92°45′46″W). However a dam was built to block off its mouth, a narrow channel was cut above the dam to the St. Croix River, the channel was dammed, and a mill was built to exploit the head of water that the two dams created. Subsequently, the Willow River Power Company built a hydroelectric facility to utilize the same head of water, but the head was substantially decreased when the United States built the Red Wing Dam 30 miles (48 km) downstream on the Mississippi River.

The river winds back and forth with a slow flowage. In its upper reaches it flows through the Cylon Marsh State Wildlife Area. It passes south of Deer Park by about one mile. It then passes through New Richmond, Boardman, and Burkhardt. Near Burkhardt it enters Willow River State Park.

The river can be navigated north of the unincorporated community of Burkhardt. River access is available at New Richmond's Nature Center. Each spring rainbow and brook trout are stocked at various locations along the river.

The status of the Willow River as a non-navigable stream figured in constitutional litigation over whether a head of water to which it contributed was a property interest for purposes of the Fifth Amendment, in United States v. Willow River Power Co..
