= Wisconsin Highway 118 =

State highway in Wisconsin, United States

State Trunk Highway 118
- WIS 118 highlighted in red

Route information
- Maintained by WisDOT
- Length: 6.86 mi (11.04 km)

Major junctions
- West end: US 63 in Benoit
- East end: WIS 112 in Ashland

Location
- Country: United States
- State: Wisconsin
- Counties: Bayfield, Ashland

Highway system
- Wisconsin State Trunk Highway System; Interstate; US; State; Scenic; Rustic
← US 118	→ WIS 119

State Trunk Highway 118 (often called Highway 118, STH-118 or WIS 118) is a 6.86-mile (11.04 km) state highway in the U.S. state of Wisconsin. It runs from U.S. Route 63 east of Benoit east to Wisconsin Highway 112 south of Ashland. The highway is located in Bayfield and Ashland Counties in northwest Wisconsin. Highway 118 is maintained by the Wisconsin Department of Transportation.

== Route description ==
Highway 118 begins at an intersection with US 63 and County Highway F east of Benoit. The intersection is located at the quadripoint of four towns; the Town of Eileen, Town of Kelly, Town of Keystone and Town of Mason. From here, Highway 118 heads east along the border of the Town of Eileen and the Town of Kelly. The route runs through a rural area, passing numerous farms. The White River runs to the south of the highway for most of its length, coming closer to the road in the east. After crossing into Ashland County, the highway follows the border between the Town of Gingles and Town of White River. It curves slightly before terminating at a junction with Highway 112. The highway is an undivided two-lane road for its entire length.

== Major intersections ==
County	Location	mi	km	Destinations	Notes
Bayfield	Eileen–Kelly– Keystone–Mason town quadripoint	0.0	0.0	US 63 – Ashland, Hayward	Western terminus
Ashland	Gingles–White River town line	6.8	10.9	WIS 112 – Ashland, Marengo	Eastern terminus
1.000 mi = 1.609 km; 1.000 km = 0.621 mi
