= Wisconsin Highway 46 =

State highway in Wisconsin, United States

State Trunk Highway 46
- WIS 46 highlighted in red

Route information
- Maintained by WisDOT
- Length: 34.13 mi (54.93 km)

Major junctions
- South end: US 63 / WIS 64 in Deer Park
- US 8 in Balsam Lake
- North end: WIS 35 in Milltown

Location
- Country: United States
- State: Wisconsin
- Counties: St. Croix, Polk

Highway system
- Wisconsin State Trunk Highway System; Interstate; US; State; Scenic; Rustic
← WIS 45	→ WIS 47

State Trunk Highway 46 (often called Highway 46, STH-46 or WIS 46) is a state highway in the U.S. state of Wisconsin. It runs in north–south in west-central Wisconsin from Cylon to Milltown. Other towns connected to Highway 46 are Balsam Lake, Amery, and Deer Park. Near Cylon, in an area known as the four corners, Highway 46 intersects Highways 63 and 64.

== Route description ==
WIS 46 begins northward from a roundabout near Cylon. This is where US 63, WIS 46, and WIS 64 meet. Further north, it then crosses the Apple River. After that, it passes the Amery Municipal Airport (which is north of the river). Then, the route enters Amery. Before meeting US 8, WIS 46 then crosses the Apple River again. After crossing the river, it then turns west, traveling along US 8 for around a couple of miles. Meanwhile, WIS 46, as well as US 8, cross the aforementioned Apple River. After leaving the concurrency, it then traveled north to Balsam Lake. Going further north, the road then curves west towards downtown Milltown. However, the route turns north, avoiding downtown. After intersecting the Ice Age National Scenic Trail, it then meets WIS 35. At that point, WIS 46 ends there.

== History ==
Initially, WIS 46 largely traveled from Cylon to WIS 14 (now US 8) via part of its modern-day routing. In 1919, it extended southwest to WIS 12 (now US 12) via present-day WIS 64 and WIS 65. By 1924, its southernmost portion moved eastward and extended south to largely follow present-day US 63. It traveled all the way to Red Wing, Minnesota. After the formation of U.S. Routes in 1926, most of WIS 14 became US 8. WIS 46 then superseded part of the older alignment from US 8 to WIS 35 in Centuria. By 1935, US 63 supplanted a portion of WIS 46 south of Cylon. By 1936, WIS 46 moved its service from Centuria to Milltown.

== Major intersections ==
County	Location	mi	km	Destinations	Notes
St. Croix	Cylon	0.0	0.0	US 63 / WIS 64 – New Richmond, Baldwin, Connorsville	
Polk	Town of Apple River	18.4	29.6	US 8 east – Turtle Lake, Barron	Eastern end of US 8 concurrency
Polk	Town of Balsam Lake	22.5	36.2	US 8 west – St. Croix Falls	Western end of US 8 concurrency
Polk	Milltown	34.13	54.93	WIS 35 – Milltown, Luck	
1.000 mi = 1.609 km; 1.000 km = 0.621 mi: Concurrency terminus
