= Kelly, Wisconsin (disambiguation) =

Kelly, Wisconsin may refer to:

- Kelly, Wisconsin, a town in Bayfield County
- Kelly, Juneau County, Wisconsin, an unincorporated community
- Kelly, a neighborhood of Weston, Wisconsin
