= Wisconsin Highway 137 =

State highway in Wisconsin, United States

State Trunk Highway 137
- WIS 137 highlighted in red

Route information
- Maintained by WisDOT
- Length: 6.25 mi (10.06 km)
- Existed: 1971–present

Major junctions
- West end: US 2 in Town of Eileen
- East end: WIS 112 in Ashland

Location
- Country: United States
- State: Wisconsin
- Counties: Bayfield, Ashland

Highway system
- Wisconsin State Trunk Highway System; Interstate; US; State; Scenic; Rustic
← WIS 136	→ WIS 138

State Trunk Highway 137 (often called Highway 137, STH-137 or WIS 137) is a state highway Bayfield and Ashland counties in northern Wisconsin, United States. It runs from its western terminus at U.S. Route 2 (US 2) west of Ashland to its eastern terminus at WIS 112 in Ashland. Like all Wisconsin state highways, WIS 137 is maintained by the Wisconsin Department of Transportation (WisDOT).

== Route description ==
WIS 137 begins at a four-way intersection with US 2 and a local road (Kanes Road) in an unincorporated area of eastern Bayfield County, about 3.5 miles (5.6 km) west of Ashland,. (US 2 heads northeast through Ashland and on to Odanah and then Ironwood, Michigan. US 2 heads west to connect with the northern terminus of U.S. Route 63 and then on to Iron River and Superior. Kanes road continues north for only about 600 feet [180 m] before becoming a dirt farm road.)

From its western terminus WIS 137 heads easterly as a two-lane road and promptly curves from a southeast direction to head due east through rual farmland for about 1.25 miles (2.01 km). The highway then curves to the northeast and continues in that direction until it nearly reaches the Tri-County Corridor (an ATV rail trail on the grade of a former Northern Pacific Railway rail line which runs from Superior to Ashland). The highway then heads easterly (running roughly parallel to, but south of, the Tri-County Corridor for the remainder of its course). About 1,500 feet (460 m) after resuming its easterly course, the highway crosses over the South Fish Creek. About 1.2 miles (1.9 km) later it leaves Bayfield County and enters both Ashland County and the city of Ashland.

Within Ashland WIS 137 is initially signed as Golf Course Road. (The name comes from the Chequamegon Bay Golf Club, along the north side of which the highway passes). About 1 mile (1.6 km) after entering Ashland and after turning to head northeast, WIS 137 intersects Wisconsin Highway 112 (WIS 112), locally known as Sanborn Avenue, at a four-way intersection. After crossing WIS 112, WIS 137 ends and becomes 6th Street.

== History ==
The original WIS 137 was assigned in 1923 to a short highway between Wisconsin Highway 39 and Wisconsin Highway 23 in Iowa County. This route became a county road in 1934, and the WIS 137 designation was reassigned to another route in Iowa County between Wisconsin Highway 80 in Avoca and Wisconsin Highway 130 in Lone Rock. WIS 137 remained on this route until 1968, when it was replaced by Wisconsin Highway 133. The WIS 137 designation was assigned to its current route in the Ashland area in 1971; it replaced WIS 112, which was rerouted in the area.

== Major intersections ==
County	Location	mi	km	Destinations	Notes
Bayfield	Town of Eileen	0.0	0.0	US 2 – Ashland, Odanah, Ironwood, Iron River, Superior; Kanes Road	Western terminus; roadway continues as Kanes Road
Ashland	Ashland	4.8	7.7	WIS 112 (Sanborn Avenue)	Eastern terminus; roadway continues as 6th Street
1.000 mi = 1.609 km; 1.000 km = 0.621 mi
