= Cylon =

Cylon may refer to:

== Places ==
- Cylon, Wisconsin, a town in St. Croix County, US
- Cylon (community), Wisconsin, an unincorporated community in St Croix County, US

== People ==
- Cylon of Athens, who attempted a coup in 632 BCE
- Cylon of Croton, who led a revolt against the Pythagoreans probably around 509 BC

== Other uses ==
- Cylon (Battlestar Galactica), a type of sentient robot on the television series Battlestar Galactica

== See also ==
- Zylon, synthetic fiber
- Ceylon, a former name for Sri Lanka
