= Cylon Wildlife Area =

Protected area in Wisconsin, US

- IUCN category V (protected landscape/seascape)
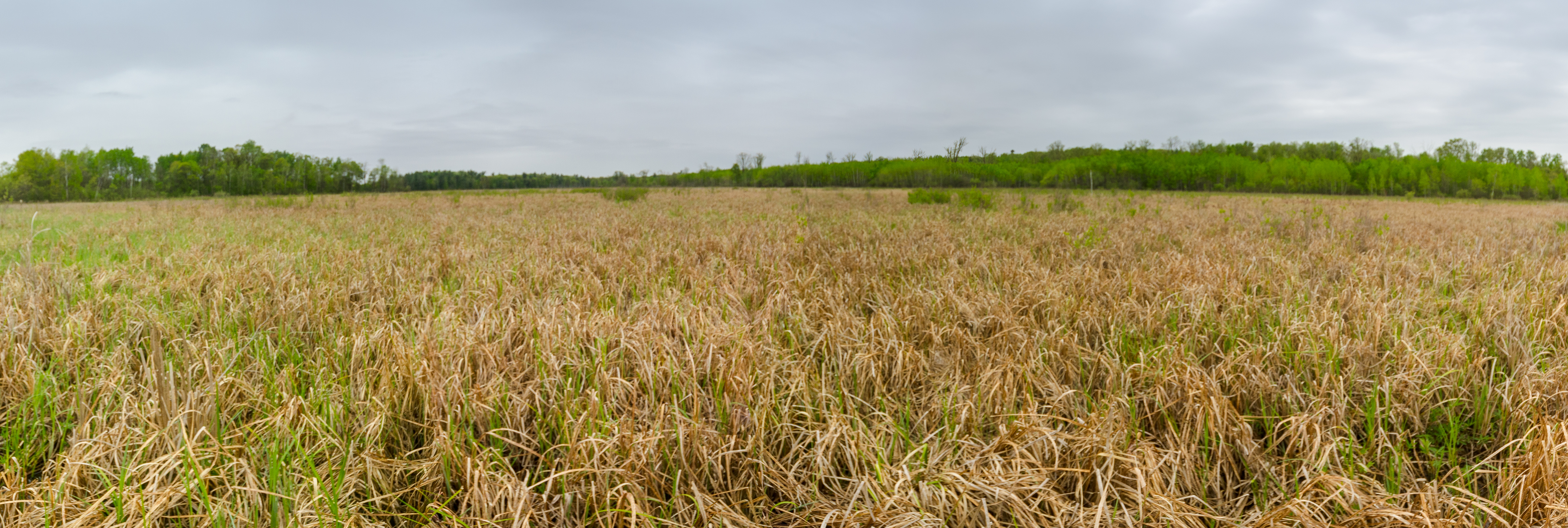
- Sedge meadows in Cylon Wildlife Area and Cylon State Natural Area

- Location within Wisconsin Location within the United States
- Location: St. Croix County, Wisconsin
- Nearest city: Deer Park, Wisconsin
- Coordinates: 45.177925°N 92.336794°W
- Area: 2,342 acres (9.48 km^{2})
- Established: 1975
- Governing body: Wisconsin Department of Natural Resources

Cylon Wildlife Area is a tract of protected land located in the northeastern corner of St. Croix County, Wisconsin, managed by the Wisconsin Department of Natural Resources (WDNR). The wildlife area presents a unique opportunity to preserve the last public land in St. Croix County.

== History ==
Early settlers came to the area in the early 1850s, settling where the town of Deer Park sits now. Before European settlers arrived, the Santee Sioux and the Ojibwa people lived in the general area.

The land to be used for the wildlife area was acquired in 1975, with a current acreage goal of 2,980 acres (1,210 ha). The Wildlife Area falls within the bounds of the Western Prairie region of Wisconsin.

== Cylon State Natural Area ==
Adjacent to the Cylon Wildlife area, the Cylon State Natural Area is a 207 acres (84 ha) collection of four separate areas featuring woodlands and sedge meadows. The land runs south of the Willow River, which acts as a boundary between the natural area and the wildlife area. The natural area is operated as a smaller part of the wildlife area.
