= Wisconsin Highway 63 =

State highway in Wisconsin, United States

State Trunk Highway 63

Route information
- Maintained by WisDOT
- Existed: 1917–1934

Location
- Country: United States
- State: Wisconsin

Highway system
- Wisconsin State Trunk Highway System; Interstate; US; State; Scenic; Rustic
← WIS 62	→ WIS 64

State Trunk Highway 63 (often called Highway 63, STH-63 or WIS 63) was a state highway running between Merrill and Eagle River. The highway is now part of WIS 17.
