= Wisconsin Highway 112 =

State highway in Wisconsin, United States

State Trunk Highway 112
- WIS 112 highlighted in red

Route information
- Maintained by WisDOT
- Length: 12.58 mi (20.25 km)

Major junctions
- South end: WIS 13 in Marengo
- WIS 118 in Ashland; WIS 137 in Ashland
- North end: US 2 / WIS 13 / LSCT in Ashland

Location
- Country: United States
- State: Wisconsin
- Counties: Ashland

Highway system
- Wisconsin State Trunk Highway System; Interstate; US; State; Scenic; Rustic
← WIS 111	→ WIS 113

State Trunk Highway 112 (often called Highway 112, STH-112 or WIS 112) is a state highway in the U.S. state of Wisconsin. It runs in a north–south in northwest Wisconsin from Marengo to Ashland.

== Route description ==
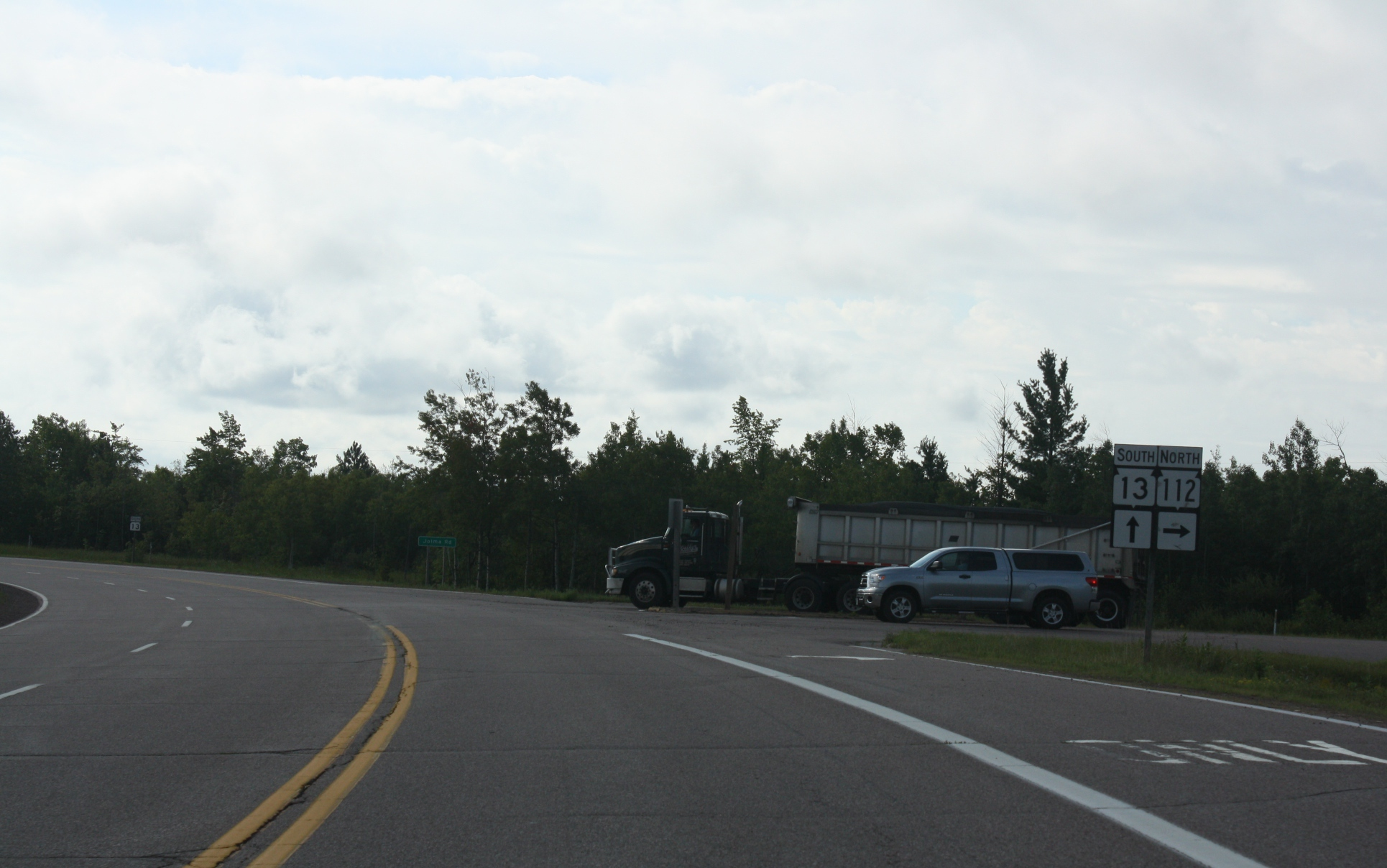
East terminus

Starting at WIS 13 north of Marengo, WIS 112 starts to travel westward. After over 3 miles (4.8 km) of traveling westward, it then turns northward north of Sanborn. After crossing the river, it then intersects WIS 118. Continuing north, it then encounters the John F. Kennedy Memorial Airport, then enters the city of Ashland, and then intersects WIS 137 before it intersects US 2/WIS 13. At that point, the route ends there.

== Major intersections ==
The entire route is in Ashland County.

Location	mi	km	Destinations	Notes
Town of White River			WIS 13 – Mellen, Ashland	Southern terminus
White River–Gingles town line			WIS 118 west – Benoit	
Ashland			WIS 137 west (6th Street)	Southern end of Alternate US 2 and Alternate WI 13 overlap
Ashland			US 2 / WIS 13 / LSCT (Lake Shore Drive)	Northern terminus
1.000 mi = 1.609 km; 1.000 km = 0.621 mi: Concurrency terminus
