= Willow River State Park =

State park in St. Croix County, Wisconsin

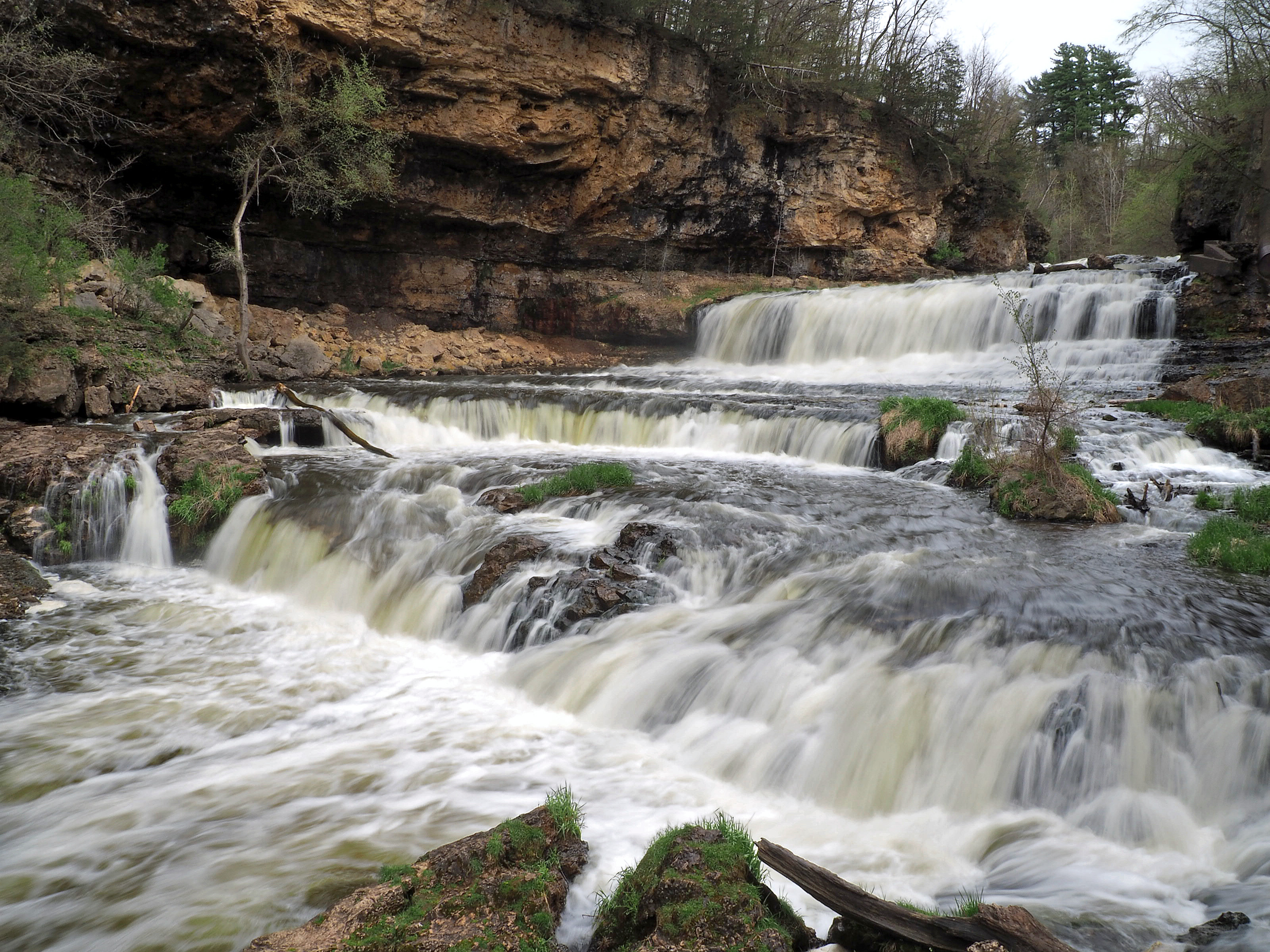
- Willow Falls

- Location within Wisconsin Location within the United States
- Interactive map of Willow River State Park
- Location: St. Croix County, Wisconsin, United States
- Coordinates: 45°0′56″N 92°41′44″W
- Area: 2,891 acres (1,170 ha)
- Elevation: 742 ft (226 m)
- Established: 1967
- Administrator: Wisconsin Department of Natural Resources
- Visitors: 686,614 (DNR est.) (in 2024)
- Website: Official website
- Wisconsin State Parks

Willow River State Park is a 2,891-acre (1,170 ha) Wisconsin state park located five miles (8 km) north of Hudson. The centerpiece of the park is Willow Falls, a powerful cascade in a 200-foot (61 m) deep gorge. Another popular feature is Little Falls Lake, a shallow reservoir on the Willow River. Because of its proximity to Minneapolis-St. Paul it is one of the most visited state parks in Wisconsin. Trilobite fossils found in the lower layers of the gorge indicate the rock is around 600 million years old.

== History ==
Santee Sioux and Ojibwe tribes lived in the region and clashed over rights to wild rice lakes. European explorers witnessed one of their battles in 1795 at the mouth of the Willow River.

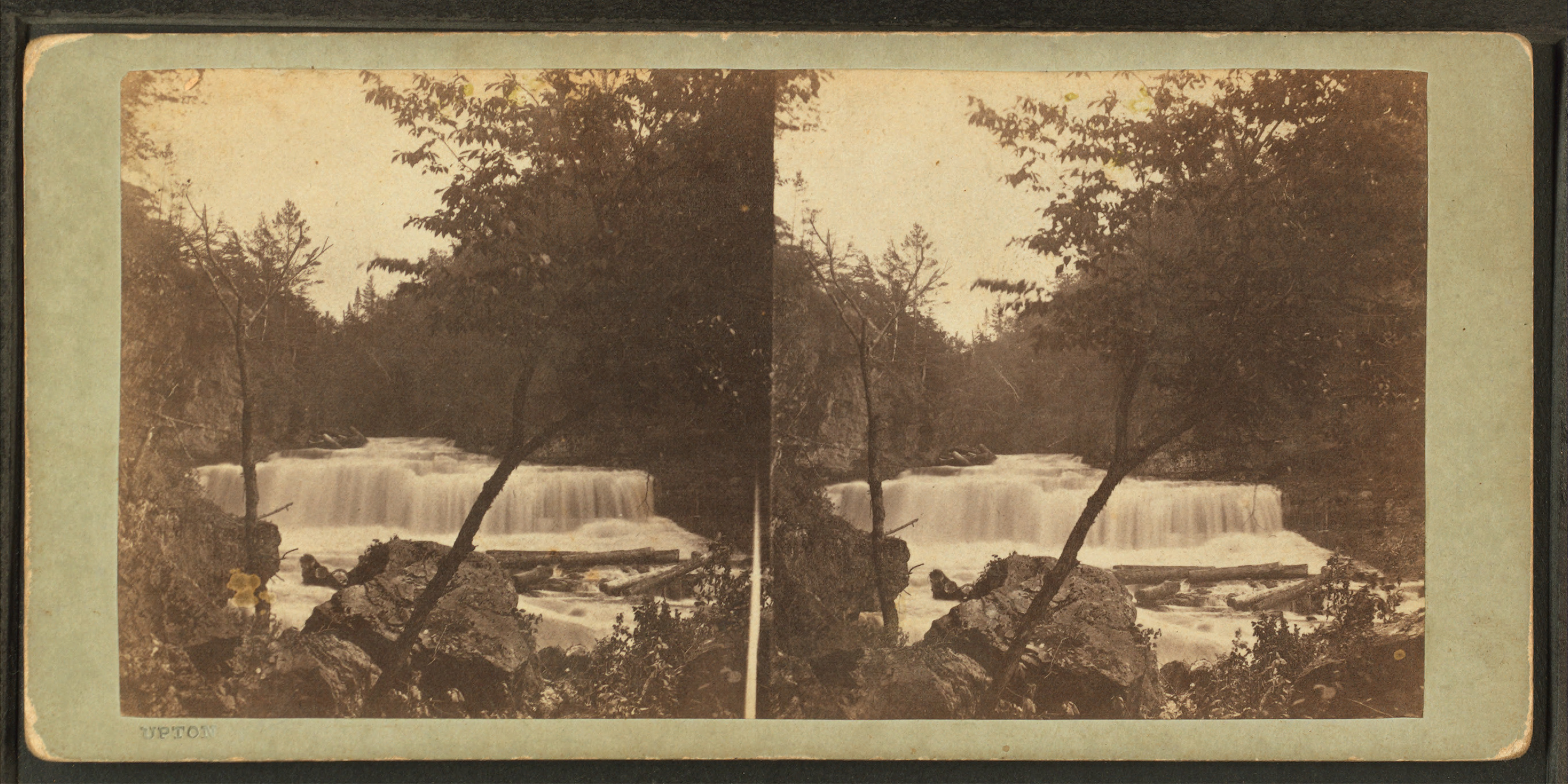
Stereoscopic photograph of the falls by Benjamin Franklin Upton

Settlers moved in, and by 1830 logging and wheat farming were common in the Willow River Valley. The river was invaluable for the former, as logs were floated downstream to the St. Croix. A German immigrant, Christian Burkhardt, realized the river could also be harnessed for the latter industry, and built a grist mill here in 1868. Burkhardt became a wealthy landowner and followed developments in water-powered industry. He traveled home to Germany to examine hydroelectric power plants and returned in 1891 to build his own on the Willow River. Burkhardt eventually built four power plants and dams on the river, which provided electricity to Hudson. Northern States Power purchased Burkhardt's power company in 1945 and operated its sites until 1963, when damage to one of the plants from a lightning strike prompted the company to liquidate their Willow River holdings.

In 1967 Northern States Power sold the land to the Wisconsin Conservation Commission for a state park, and stabilized the dams at a financial loss. The state park opened in 1971. Some of the dams were removed in the 1990s to improve the scenery and trout fishery, and now only one remains. The land is still being restored from damming and farming.

== Recreation ==
The park includes the following recreational activities:

- Boating: A boat ramp provides access to Little Falls Lake for non-motorized watercraft.
- Camping: There is a shaded campground with 72 sites (19 with electrical hookups). The park also has 50 new camp sites in a natural prairie area, 28 of which are electric and 6 of which are pull through sites for large RVs.
- Fishing: Stocked and naturally reproducing trout are found throughout the Willow River.
- Rock climbing: There are several bolted sport climbs on the gorge walls, ranging from 5.9 to 5.14c in difficulty. The majority of the routes are 5.12 and up. This area contains a high concentration of steep overhanging routes. The rock is a mixture of limestone and dolomite. Some restrictions on climbing, which are enforced year-around, include no climbing allowed on Saturday or after noon on Friday or Sunday. In addition, leaving fixed gear is prohibited, and rappelling from the top of the gorge is not allowed. Climbers need to be aware of possible loose rock and ensure no one is located in a potential rock fall area.
- Swimming: A beach along the southern shore of Little Falls Lake has picnic tables, a beach house, and extensive parking.
- Trails
  - Hidden Ponds Nature Trail (hiking, accessible): Guides are available at the head of this paved loop around a wetland (0.6 miles (3,200 ft; 970 m)).
  - Little Falls Trail (hiking, biking, rollerblading): Follows the developed shoreline from the campground to the dam (0.9 miles (4,800 ft; 1,400 m)).
  - Willow Falls Trail (hiking): Follows the shoreline from the campground to Willow Falls (0.9 miles (4,800 ft; 1,400 m)).
  - Willow Falls Hill Trail (hiking): A steep shortcut to the falls from a separate parking lot (0.3 miles (1,600 ft; 480 m)).
  - Trout Brook Trail (hiking): A level out-and-back route along the river below the dam (1.1 miles (5,800 ft; 1,800 m)).
  - Oak Ridge Trail (hiking): A forested path between the lake parking and the campground (0.9 miles (4,800 ft; 1,400 m)).
  - White Tail Trail (hiking): A loop off the Oak Ridge Trail through forest meadows popular with white tail deer (1.6 miles (8,400 ft; 2,600 m)).
  - Knapweed Trail (hiking): Passes through fields being restored into prairie and forest (0.9 miles (4,800 ft; 1,400 m)).
  - Pioneer Trail (hiking): Leads past the gravesite of early European settlers to an overlook of Willow Falls (0.9 miles (4,800 ft; 1,400 m)).
  - Burkhardt Trail (hiking): A network of trails above the falls with several overlooks (3.0 miles (15,800 ft; 4,800 m)).
  - Mound Trail (hiking): Follows the Willow River in the undeveloped northeastern part of the park, past a glacial mound (1.1 miles (5,800 ft; 1,800 m)).
- Singletrack mountain biking: A system of 17 trails ranging from beginner to advanced difficulty mostly centered in the Northwestern section of the park managed by WIKI MTB club. Note that trails are being added and the number provided may not be accurate.

== Willow River Nature Center ==
The Willow River Nature Center is located near the main picnic area, and features natural history exhibits. Naturalists offer public programs throughout the year.
