= Trego (CDP), Wisconsin =

Census-designated place in Wisconsin, United States

Trego, Wisconsin
- Census-designated place
- Location within Wisconsin
- Coordinates: 45°53′59″N 91°49′16″W
- Country: United States
- State: Wisconsin
- County: Washburn

Area
  - Total: 1.222 sq mi (3.16 km^{2})
  - Land: 1.145 sq mi (2.97 km^{2})
  - Water: 0.077 sq mi (0.20 km^{2})
- Elevation: 1,099 ft (335 m)

Population (2020)
  - Total: 187
  - Density: 163/sq mi (63.1/km^{2})
- Time zone: UTC-6 (Central (CST))
  - Summer (DST): UTC-5 (CDT)
- ZIP code: 54888
- Area codes: 715 and 534
- GNIS feature ID: 1575585

Trego (also Mills, Superior Junction) is an unincorporated census-designated place located in the town of Trego, Washburn County, Wisconsin, United States.

Trego is located at the junction of U.S. routes 53 and 63, 6 miles (9.7 km) north-northeast of Spooner.

Trego has a post office with ZIP code 54888. As of the 2010 census, its population is 227.

== History ==
Trego, supposedly meaning "three ways", was so named from its location at a rail junction.
