= Wisconsin Highway 138 =

State highway in Wisconsin, United States

State Trunk Highway 138
- WIS 138 highlighted in red

Route information
- Maintained by WisDOT
- Length: 13.23 mi (21.29 km)

Major junctions
- South end: WIS 59 in Cooksville
- US 51 in Stoughton
- North end: US 14 in Oregon

Location
- Country: United States
- State: Wisconsin
- Counties: Rock, Dane

Highway system
- Wisconsin State Trunk Highway System; Interstate; US; State; Scenic; Rustic
← WIS 137	→ WIS 139

State Trunk Highway 138 (often called Highway 138, STH-138 or WIS 138) is a state highway in the U.S. state of Wisconsin. It runs west–east between Oregon and Stoughton and north–south between Stoughton and Cooksville.

== Route description ==
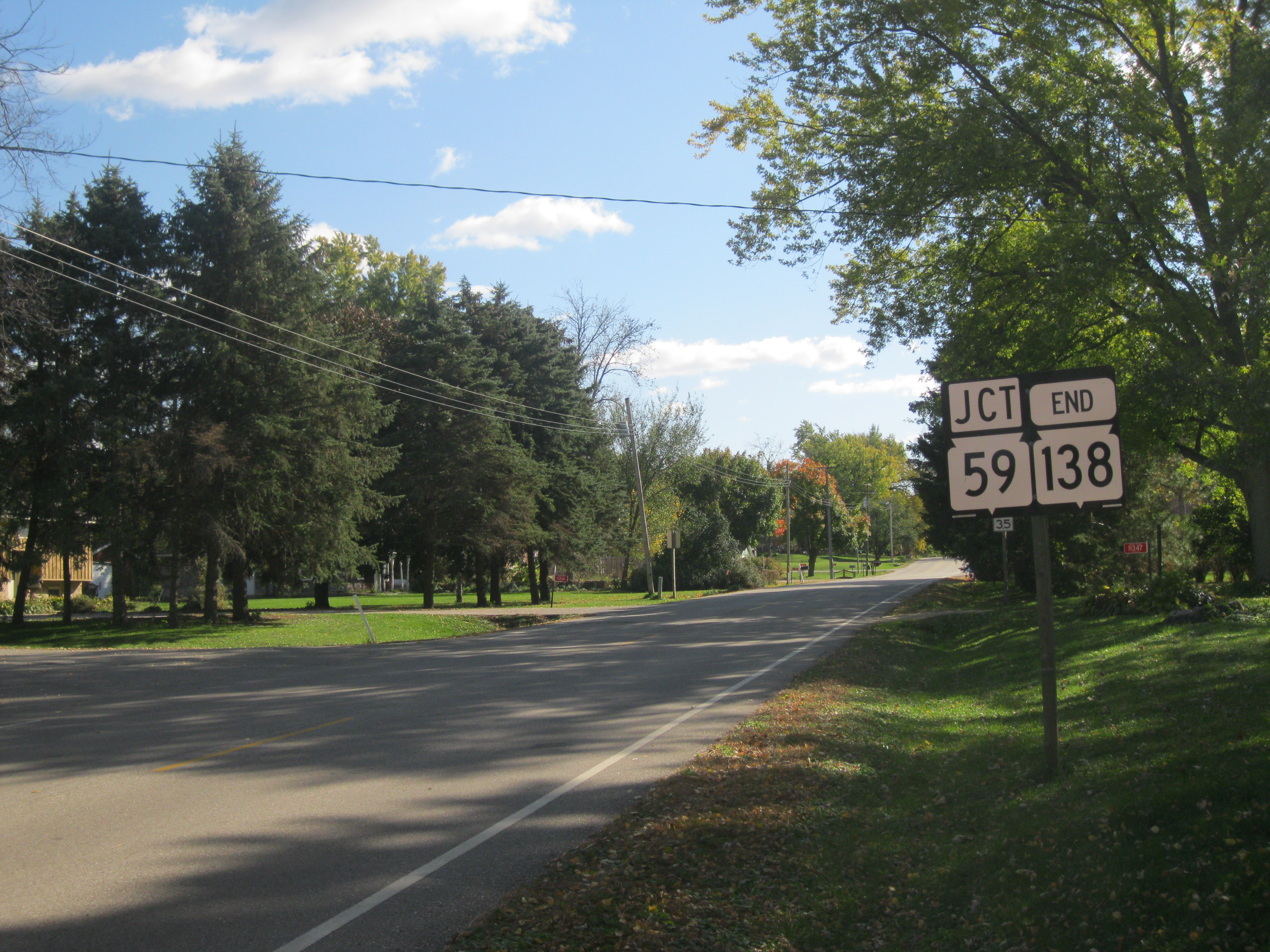
Southern terminus of WIS 138 in Cooksville

WIS 138 starts in Cooksville, an unincorporated community with an Evansville address. It runs north into Dane County towards Stoughton, although it makes one S-bend on the way. In Stoughton, it turns west with US 51. It runs concurrently with US 51 to the west side of the city, then continues west in a straight line towards Oregon. It becomes Janesville Street once it crosses US 14.

== History ==
Starting in 1923, WIS 138 was formed to travel roughly along its present-day route from WIS 10/WIS 106 (now US 51/WIS 138) in Stoughton to WIS 59 in Cooksville. Up until 1962, no major change to the routing had happened. Then, WIS 138 superseded part of WIS 106 from Stoughton to US 14 near Oregon. In late-1978, US 14 was moved onto a newly built expressway around Oregon. As a result, WIS 138 no longer needed to travel southwestward to get to US 14. Instead, it then continuously traveled westward to get to US 14.

== Major intersections ==
County	Location	mi	km	Destinations	Notes
Rock	Cooksville			WIS 59 – Cooksville	
Dane				CTH-A west	Southern end of CTH-A concurrency
Dane	Stoughton			US 51 / CTH-A west	Northern end of CTH-A concurrency
Dane	Oregon			US 14 – Oregon	
1.000 mi = 1.609 km; 1.000 km = 0.621 mi: Concurrency terminus
