= Houlton, Wisconsin =

Census-designated place in Wisconsin, United States

- Census-designated place
- Location within Wisconsin
- Coordinates: 45°03′38″N 92°47′29″W
- Country: United States
- State: Wisconsin
- County: St. Croix
- Town: St. Joseph

Area
  - Total: 1.021 sq mi (2.64 km^{2})
  - Land: 1.021 sq mi (2.64 km^{2})
  - Water: 0 sq mi (0 km^{2})
- Elevation: 873 ft (266 m)

Population (2020)
  - Total: 377
  - Density: 369/sq mi (143/km^{2})
- Time zone: UTC-6 (Central (CST))
  - Summer (DST): UTC-5 (CDT)
- ZIP code: 54082
- Area codes: 715 & 534
- GNIS feature ID: 1581648

Houlton is an unincorporated census-designated place located in the town of St. Joseph, St. Croix County, Wisconsin, United States. As of the 2020 census, Houlton had a population of 377. It is along Wisconsin Highways 35 and 64, Main Street, Hawk Street, and County Road E. Houlton is located across the St. Croix River from Stillwater, Minnesota. Houlton has no post office but has been assigned the ZIP code 54082.
