= Eileen, Wisconsin =

- Town
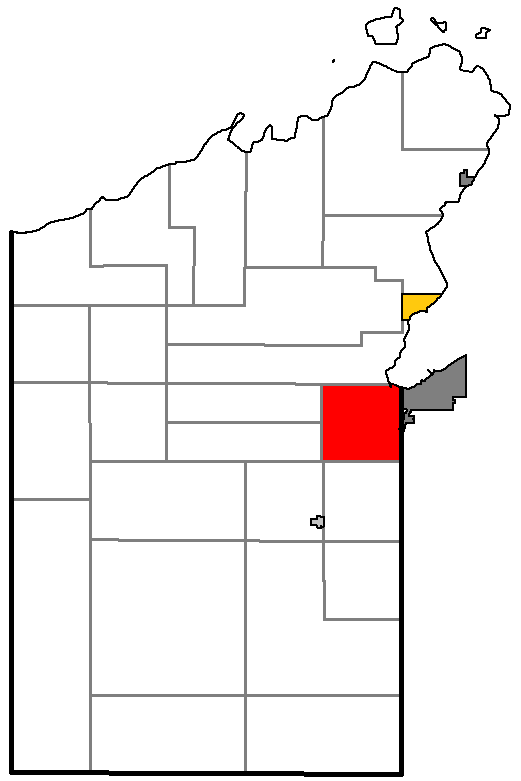
- Location of Eileen, within Bayfield County
- Coordinates: 46°33′37″N 90°59′18″W
- Country: United States
- State: Wisconsin
- County: Bayfield
- founded: 1904

Area
  - Total: 35.3 sq mi (91.4 km^{2})
  - Land: 35.2 sq mi (91.2 km^{2})
  - Water: 0.077 sq mi (0.2 km^{2})
- Elevation: 745 ft (227 m)

Population (2020)
  - Total: 722
  - Density: 20.5/sq mi (7.92/km^{2})
- Time zone: UTC-6 (Central (CST))
  - Summer (DST): UTC-5 (CDT)
- Area codes: 715 & 534
- FIPS code: 55-22925
- GNIS feature ID: 1583138
- Website: townofeileen.org

Eileen is a town in Bayfield County, Wisconsin, United States. The population was 722 at the 2020 census, up from 681 at the 2010 census. The unincorporated community of Ashland Junction is located in the town.

== History ==
The town was organized in 1904, in large part due to the efforts of state senator A. Pearce Tomkins. The town was named for the senator's daughter, Eileen Tompkins.

== Geography ==
According to the United States Census Bureau, the town of Eileen has a total area of 35.3 square miles (91.4 km^{2}), of which 35.2 square miles (91.2 km^{2}) is land and 0.077 square miles (0.2 km^{2}), or 0.21%, is water. Main routes in the town include U.S. Highways 2 and 63, Wisconsin Highways 118 and 137 and County G.

The town of Eileen is bordered to the east by the city of Ashland as well as the town of Gingles in Ashland County. It is bordered to the north by the town of Barksdale in Bayfield County.

== Demographics ==
As of the census of 2000, there were 640 people, 249 households, and 190 families residing in the town. The population density was 18.2 people per square mile (7.0/km^{2}). There were 275 housing units at an average density of 7.8 per square mile (3.0/km^{2}). The racial makeup of the town was 97.81% White, 0.47% Native American, 0.47% Asian, and 1.25% from two or more races.

There were 249 households, out of which 34.9% had children under the age of 18 living with them, 66.3% were married couples living together, 4.8% had a female householder with no husband present, and 23.3% were non-families. 18.5% of all households were made up of individuals, and 9.6% had someone living alone who was 65 years of age or older. The average household size was 2.57 and the average family size was 2.95.

In the town, the population was spread out, with 25.2% under the age of 18, 4.7% from 18 to 24, 27.8% from 25 to 44, 26.9% from 45 to 64, and 15.5% who were 65 years of age or older. The median age was 40 years. For every 100 females, there were 106.5 males. For every 100 females age 18 and over, there were 103.8 males.

The median income for a household in the town was $44,844, and the median income for a family was $52,404. Males had a median income of $38,333 versus $21,964 for females. The per capita income for the town was $19,530. About 6.9% of families and 8.9% of the population were below the poverty line, including 6.0% of those under age 18 and 15.0% of those age 65 or over.

== Notable people ==
- A. Pearce Tomkins, Wisconsin state senator, dairy farmer, and lawyer, lived in the town; Tomkins served as chairman of the Eileen Town Board
