= Wisconsin Highway 61 =

Wisconsin state highway

State Trunk Highway 61

Route information
- Maintained by WisDOT
- Existed: 1918–1926

Location
- Country: United States
- State: Wisconsin

Highway system
- Wisconsin State Trunk Highway System; Interstate; US; State; Scenic; Rustic
← US 61	→ WIS 62

State Trunk Highway 61 (often called Highway 61, STH-61 or WIS 61) was a number assigned to a state highway in the U.S. state of Wisconsin. It traveled roughly along:

- present-day Wisconsin Highway 81 (WIS 81) from Cassville to Beloit. From 1924 to 1926, WIS 61 extended westward via present-day WIS 81.
- the pre-Interstate alignment of Wisconsin Highway 15 (WIS 15) from Beloit to Milwaukee (now part of CTH-X, WIS 11, WIS 67, US 12, CTH-ES, and National Avenue). WIS 61 had always follow at least a portion of what later became WIS 15. WIS 15 had plenty of alterations before being superseded by I-43 in 1988.

The route was later designated as Wisconsin Highway 14 from 1926 to 1933 (before US 14 exists).
