= A. Pearce Tomkins =

American lawyer, farmer, and politician

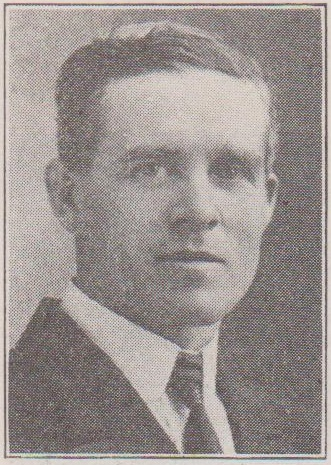
- Portrait from the 1915 edition of the Wisconsin Blue Book.

Wisconsin State Senator
- In office 1913–1917

Personal details
- Born: April 15, 1875 Ashland, Wisconsin, U.S.
- Died: September 29, 1937 (aged 62) Ashland, Wisconsin, U.S.
- Party: Republican
- Occupation: Farmer • lawyer • politician
- Known for: Established the town of Eileen, Wisconsin

A. Pearce Tomkins (April 15, 1875 – September 29, 1937) was an American lawyer, farmer and politician from Wisconsin.

Born in Ashland, Wisconsin, Tomkins went to the Ashland Public Schools. He then went to University of Wisconsin and Columbian Law School in Washington, D. C. He was admitted to the Wisconsin Bar in 1897. He lived in and helped establish the town of Eileen, Bayfield County, Wisconsin (which was named after his daughter). He practiced law and was a dairy farmer. Tomkins served as chairman of the Eileen Town Board and on the Bayfield County Board of Supervisors. He also served as assessor for the city of Ashland. From 1913 to 1917, Tomkins served in the Wisconsin State Senate and was a Republican. From 1918 until with death in 1937, Tomkins served as assessor of incomes for the Wisconsin Tax Commission. Tomkins died suddenly at his home in Ashland, Wisconsin on September 29, 1937, aged 62.
