= Red Wing Regional Airport =

Airport in Wisconsin, United States of America

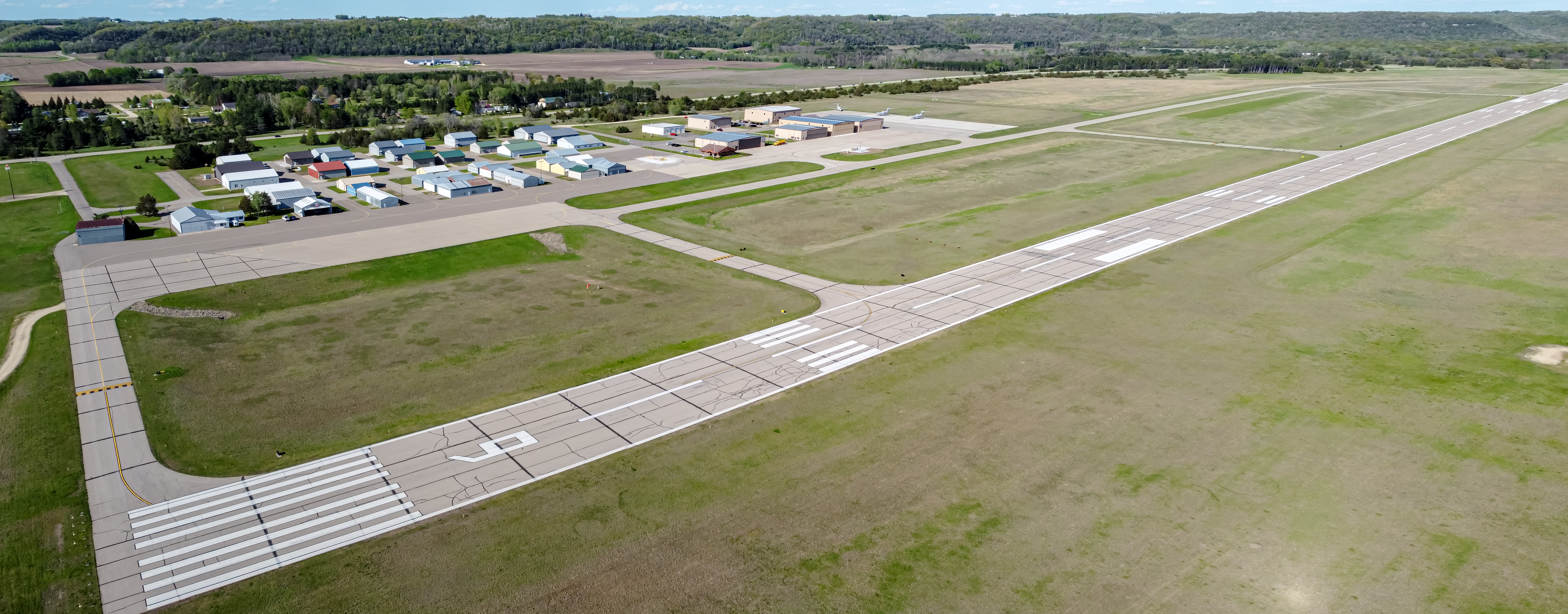
- IATA: none; ICAO: KRGK; FAA LID: RGK

Summary
- Airport type: Public
- Owner: City of Red Wing
- Serves: Red Wing, Minnesota
- Location: Hager City, Wisconsin
- Elevation AMSL: 778 ft (237 m)
- Coordinates: 44°35′22″N 092°29′06″W
- Website: www.redwingairport.com

Map
- Location of airport in Wisconsin RGK (Minnesota) RGK (the United States)

Runways
Direction	Length		Surface
Direction	ft	m	Surface
9/27	5,010	1,527	Asphalt

Statistics
- Aircraft operations (2019): 14,050
- Based aircraft (2024): 67
- Sources: Minnesota DOT, FAA

Red Wing Regional Airport (ICAO: KRGK, FAA LID: RGK) is a city-owned public-use airport located in Pierce County, Wisconsin, three nautical miles (6 km) northeast of the central business district of Red Wing, a city in Goodhue County, Minnesota, United States.

Although most U.S. airports use the same three-letter location identifier for the FAA and IATA, this airport is assigned RGK by the FAA but has no designation from the IATA. It is included in the Federal Aviation Administration (FAA) National Plan of Integrated Airport Systems for 2021–2025, in which it is categorized as a regional general aviation facility.

== Facilities and aircraft ==
Red Wing Regional Airport covers an area of 534 acres (216 ha) at an elevation of 778 feet (237 m) above mean sea level. It has one runway designated 9/27 with an asphalt surface measuring 5,010 by 100 feet (1,527 x 30 m).

For the 12-month period ending June 30, 2019, the airport had 14,050 aircraft operations, an average of 38 per day: 93% general aviation, 5% military and 2% air taxi. In January 2024, there were 67 aircraft based at this airport: 38 single-engine, 5 multi-engine and 24 jet.

Blue Airways has operated as the airport's fixed-base operator (FBO) since 2004, providing fueling, aircraft maintenance, and avionics.

== Accidents and incidents ==
On September 6, 2022, a Stoddard-Hamilton Glasair Super II impacted terrain off Highway 35 on airport property. Two people were killed.

== See also ==
- List of airports in Minnesota
- List of airports in Wisconsin
