= Clayton, Wisconsin =

Clayton is the name of some places in the U.S. state of Wisconsin:

- Clayton, Crawford County, Wisconsin, a town
- Clayton, Polk County, Wisconsin a town
- Clayton, Winnebago County, Wisconsin, a town
- Clayton (village), Wisconsin in Polk County, a village
