= Clayton, Polk County, Wisconsin =

Town of Clayton
- Town
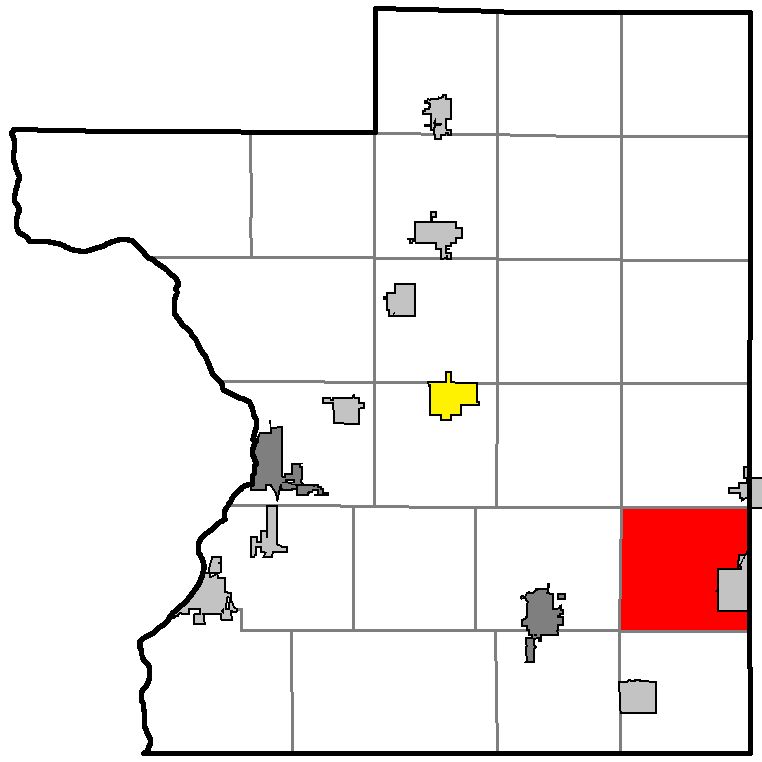
- Location of the Town of Clayton, within Polk County

- Location of the Town of Clayton
- Coordinates: 45°19′26″N 92°10′15″W
- Country: United States
- State: Wisconsin
- County: Polk
- Date Established: April 4, 1875

Government
  - Chairman: Bill Vanda
  - Supervisor: Paul Ladwig
  - Supervisor: Roger Olson
  - Supervisor: Scott Gilbertson
  - Supervisor: Arling "Ole" Olson

Area
  - Total: 33.8 sq mi (87.6 km^{2})
  - Land: 33.2 sq mi (86.1 km^{2})
  - Water: 0.62 sq mi (1.6 km^{2})

Population (2020)
  - Total: 958
  - Density: 28.8/sq mi (11.1/km^{2})
- Time zone: UTC-6 (Central (CST))
  - Summer (DST): UTC-5 (CDT)
- Area codes: 715 & 534

The Town of Clayton is located in Polk County, Wisconsin, United States. The population was reported as 958 in 2020 according to the 2020 US census. The Village of Clayton is distinct and contains its own leadership but shares the same school district (Clayton School District) as the town. The town contains the unincorporated communities of Joel and Richardson.

== Geography ==
According to the United States Census Bureau, the town has a total area of 33.8 square miles (87.6 km^{2}), of which 33.2 square miles (86.1 km^{2}) is land and 0.6 square mile (1.6 km^{2}) (1.80%) is water.

== Demographics ==
As of the census of 2020, there were 958 people, 459 households, and 418 families residing in the town. The population density was 28 people per square mile (10.6/km^{2}). There were 459 housing units. The racial makeup of the town was 95.97% White, 0% Native American, 0% Asian, and 1.93% from two or more races. 2.1% of the population were Hispanic or Latino of any race.

There were 360 households, out of which 32.8% had children under the age of 18 living with them, 62.8% were married couples living together, 4.7% had a female householder with no husband present, and 26.9% were non-families. 23.3% of all households were made up of individuals, and 7.5% had someone living alone who was 65 years of age or older. The average household size was 2.53 and the average family size was 2.94.

In the town, the population was spread out, with 26.1% under the age of 18, 5.5% from 18 to 24, 27.3% from 25 to 44, 28.8% from 45 to 64, and 12.3% who were 65 years of age or older. The median age was 39 years. For every 100 females, there were 113.6 males. For every 100 females age 18 and over, there were 116.0 males.

The median income for a household in the town was $41,719, and the median income for a family was $47,031. Males had a median income of $27,891 versus $22,656 for females. The per capita income for the town was $17,985. About 4.6% of families and 8.5% of the population were below the poverty line, including 11.0% of those under age 18 and 10.9% of those age 65 or over.
