= Wisconsin Highway 62 =

State highway in Wisconsin, United States

State Trunk Highway 62

Route information
- Length: 4.5 mi (7.2 km)
- Existed: 1942–1999

Major junctions
- South end: WIS 32 / CTH-ZZ at the South Milwaukee–Cudahy line
- North end: WIS 32 in Milwaukee

Location
- Country: United States
- State: Wisconsin
- Counties: Milwaukee

Highway system
- Wisconsin State Trunk Highway System; Interstate; US; State; Scenic; Rustic
| ← WIS 61 | → US 63 |

State Trunk Highway 62 (often called Highway 62, STH-62 or WIS 62) was a state highway in the U.S. state of Wisconsin. Its latest routing ran north–south on South Packard and Kinnickinnic avenues within the cities of Cudahy, St. Francis, and Milwaukee. Maintenance was turned back to the cities in 1999, and signs were removed, after the completion of the Lake Parkway (WIS 794).

== Route description ==
At its latest routing, WIS 62 traveled northward via Packard Avenue. This portion of WIS 62 was 1/2 mile (0.80 km) west of WIS 32. In downtown Cudahy, WIS 62 briefly turned westward on Plankinton Avenue before turning northwest onto Kinnickinnic Avenue. Continuing north, it then intersected Oklahoma Avenue (formerly part of WIS 32). At that point, the route ended there. The roadway continued northward as WIS 32. This routing functionally made it an alternate route of WIS 32.

== History ==
Initially, WIS 62 ran from WIS 20 (now WIS 11) north of Dunbarton to WIS 28 (now US 151) in Mineral Point. In 1931, WIS 62 extended northwest to Edmund along a westernmost portion of former and present-day WIS 39. In 1938, WIS 62 was removed in favor of extending WIS 23 and restoring WIS 39's Edmund connection.

In 1942, WIS 62 was redesignated. This time, it largely functioned as an alternate route of WIS 42 (later WIS 32 since 1951) south of Milwaukee. It ran from College Avenue to Russell Avenue via South Packard and Kinnickinnic avenues. In 1980, a small portion of WIS 32 moved southward from Russell Avenue to Oklahoma Avenue. As a result, the northernmost portion of WIS 62 (between Russell and Oklahoma avenues) was removed. In 1999, WIS 62 was decommissioned again due to the construction of Lake Parkway (WIS 794). WIS 62 has not been used ever since.

== Major intersections ==
The entire highway was in Milwaukee County.

| Location | mi | km | Destinations | Notes |
|---|---|---|---|---|
| South Milwaukee–Cudahy line | 0.0 | 0.0 | WIS 32 / CTH-ZZ west (East College Avenue) | Southern terminus of WIS 62 |
| Milwaukee | 4.5 | 7.2 | WIS 32 (East Oklahoma Avenue) | Northern terminus of WIS 62 |
1.000 mi = 1.609 km; 1.000 km = 0.621 mi
