= Hager City, Wisconsin =

Census-designated place in Wisconsin, United States

- Census-designated place
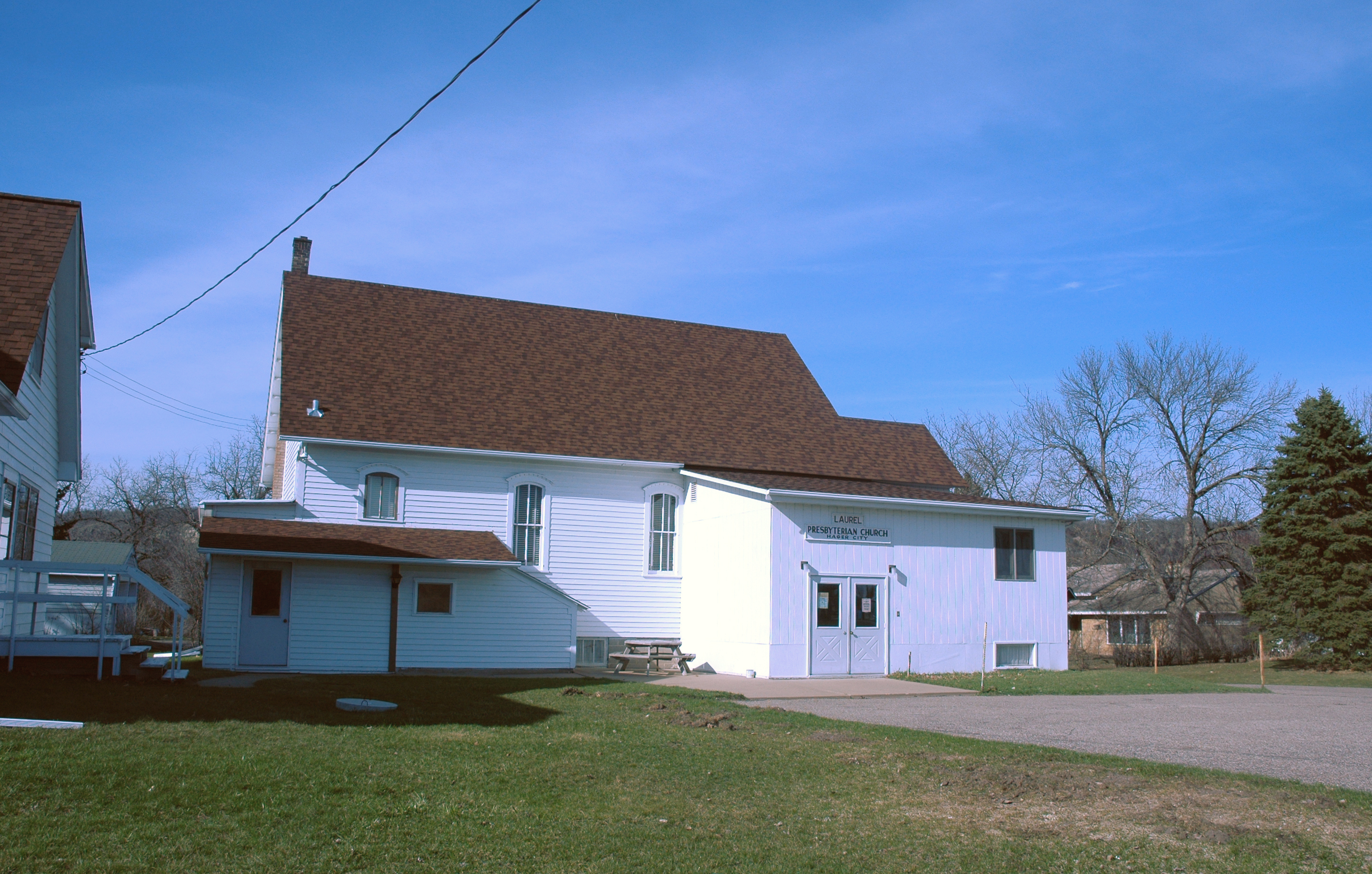
- Church in Hager City

- Location within Wisconsin
- Coordinates: 44°36′06″N 92°32′18″W
- Country: United States
- State: Wisconsin
- County: Pierce

Area
  - Total: 1.937 sq mi (5.02 km^{2})
  - Land: 1.932 sq mi (5.00 km^{2})
  - Water: 0.005 sq mi (0.013 km^{2})
- Elevation: 715 ft (218 m)

Population (2020)
  - Total: 357
  - Density: 185/sq mi (71.3/km^{2})
- Time zone: UTC-6 (Central (CST))
  - Summer (DST): UTC-5 (CDT)
- Zip: 54734
- Area codes: 715 & 534
- GNIS feature ID: 1565963

Hager City (/ˈheɪɡər/ HAY-ghər) is an unincorporated census-designated place located in the town of Trenton in Pierce County, Wisconsin, United States, across the Mississippi River from Red Wing, Minnesota. It is located near the intersection of State Highway 35 and U.S. Route 63. Hager City is served by the Ellsworth School District. As of the 2020 census, its population was 357. Hager City has an area of 1.937 square miles (5.02 km^{2}); 1.932 square miles (5.00 km^{2}) of this is land, and 0.005 square miles (0.013 km^{2}) is water.

Historical population
Census	Pop.	Note	%±
2010	338		—
2020	357		5.6%
U.S. Decennial Census
