= St. Joseph, Wisconsin =

- Town
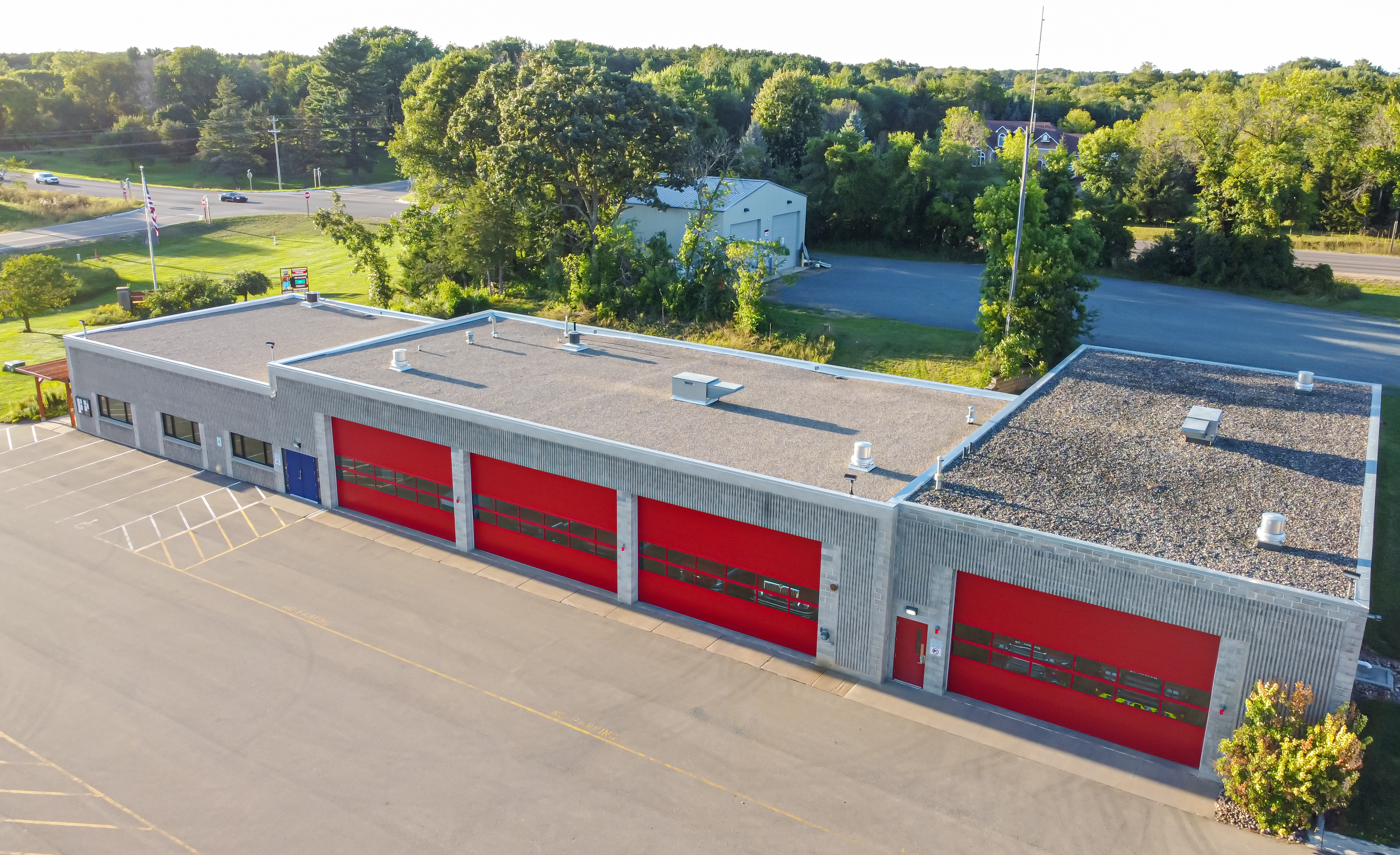
- Town hall

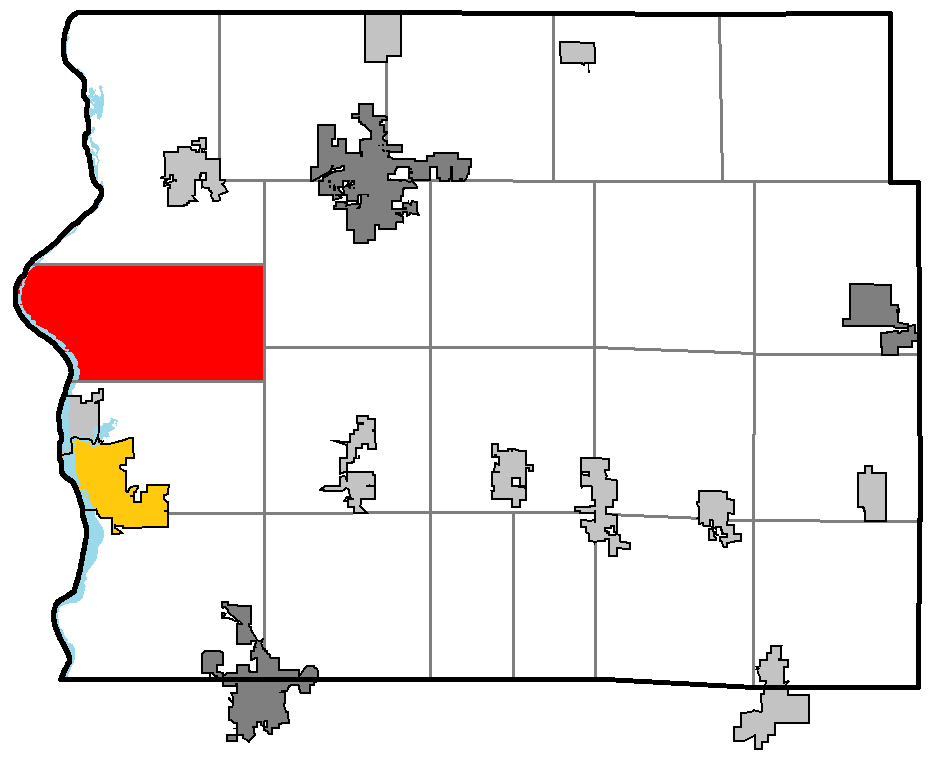
- Location of St. Joseph, within St. Croix County

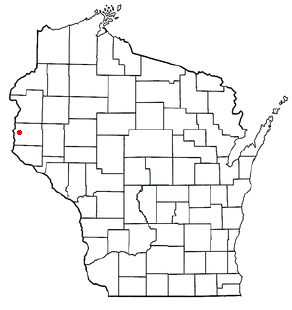
- Location of St. Joseph, Wisconsin
- Coordinates: 45°2′58″N 92°42′39″W
- Country: United States
- State: Wisconsin
- County: St. Croix

Area
  - Total: 32.0 sq mi (83.0 km^{2})
  - Land: 29.7 sq mi (76.9 km^{2})
  - Water: 2.4 sq mi (6.1 km^{2})
- Elevation: 833 ft (254 m)

Population (2020)
  - Total: 4,178
  - Density: 141/sq mi (54.3/km^{2})
- Time zone: UTC-6 (Central (CST))
  - Summer (DST): UTC-5 (CDT)
- Area codes: 715 & 534
- FIPS code: 55-70825
- GNIS feature ID: 1584089

St. Joseph is a town in St. Croix County, Wisconsin, United States. The population was 4,178 at the 2020 census. The unincorporated communities of Burkhardt, and Houlton are located in the town.

== Geography ==
According to the United States Census Bureau, the town has a total area of 32.0 square miles (82.88 km^{2}), of which 29.7 square miles (76.92 km^{2}) is land.

== Demographics ==
Historical population
Census	Pop.	Note	%±
2000	3,436		—
2010	3,842		11.8%
2020	4,178		8.7%

=== 2010 census ===
As of the census of 2010, there were 3,842 people, 1,388 households, and 1,136 families living in the town. The population density was 129.4 inhabitants per square mile (50.0/km^{2}). There were 1,511 housing units at an average density of 50.9 per square mile (19.7/km^{2}). The racial makeup of the town was 96.1% White, 2.6% from other races, and 1.3% from two or more races. Hispanic or Latino of any race were 2.4% of the population.

There were 1,388 households, out of which 35.4% had children under the age of 18 living with them, 72.4% were married couples living together, 5.4% had a female householder with no husband present, 4.0% had a male householder with no wife present, and 18.2% were non-families. 13.5% of all households were made up of individuals, and 4.2% had someone living alone who was 65 years of age or older. The average household size was 2.74 and the average family size was 3.00.

The median age in the town was 42.9 years. 24.9% of residents were under the age of 18; 5.5% were between the ages of 18 and 24; 23.5% were from 25 to 44; 36.2% were from 45 to 64; and 9.9% were 65 years of age or older. The gender makeup of the town was 51.6% male and 48.4% female.

The median household income in the town was $84,769; the per capita income was $40,466. About 5.7% of families and 8.9% of the population were below the poverty line, including 12.8% of those below the age of eighteen, but no persons over the age of sixty-five.

=== 2000 census ===
As of the census of 2000, there were 3,436 people, 1,193 households, and 979 families living in the town. The population density was 106.9 inhabitants per square mile (41.3/km^{2}). There were 1,259 housing units at an average density of 39.2 per square mile (15.1/km^{2}). The racial makeup of the town was 97.93% White, 0.26% African American, 0.26% Native American, 0.61% Asian, 0.15% Pacific Islander, 0.23% from other races, and 0.55% from two or more races. Hispanic or Latino of any race were 0.76% of the population.

There were 1,193 households, out of which 41.5% had children under the age of 18 living with them, 74.0% were married couples living together, 4.7% had a female householder with no husband present, and 17.9% were non-families. 13.4% of all households were made up of individuals, and 2.6% had someone living alone who was 65 years of age or older. The average household size was 2.86 and the average family size was 3.15.

In the town, the population was spread out, with 27.8% under the age of 18, 4.9% from 18 to 24, 33.7% from 25 to 44, 26.0% from 45 to 64, and 6.1% who were 65 years of age or older. The median age was 37 years. For every 100 females, there were 111.4 males. For every 100 females age 18 and over, there were 107.6 males.

The median income for a household in the town was $81,277, and the median income for a family was $80,606. Males had a median income of $52,813 versus $32,283 for females. The per capita income for the town was $30,988. About 0.3% of families and 1.4% of the population were below the poverty line, including none of those under the age of eighteen or sixty-five or over.
