= Spooner (town), Wisconsin =

Town in Wisconsin, United States

Spooner, Wisconsin
- Town
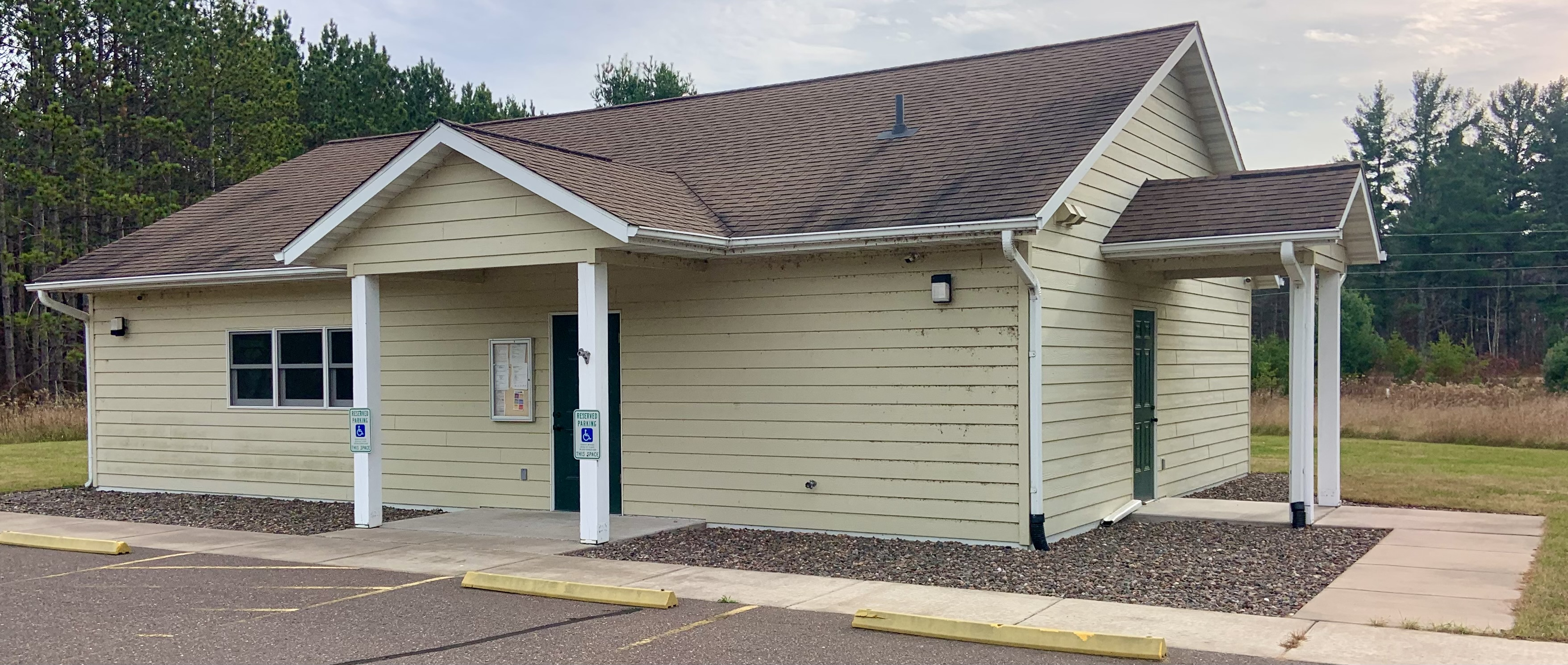
- Town hall

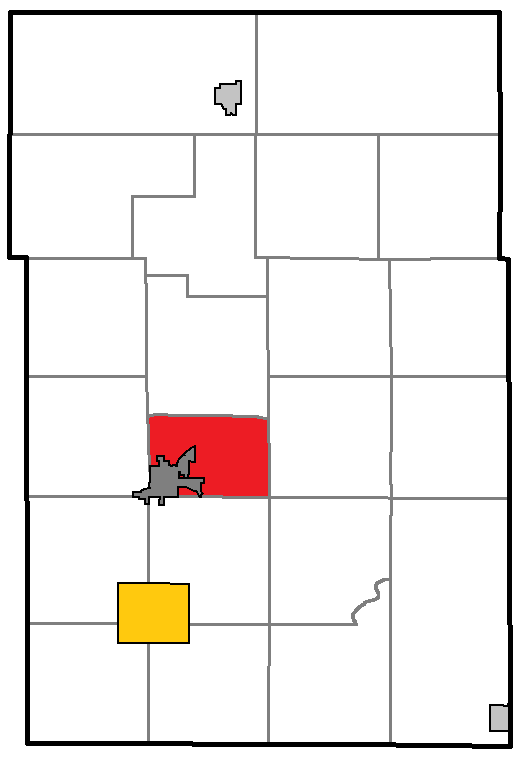
- Location of Spooner, within Washburn County
- Coordinates: 45°50′10″N 91°51′8″W
- Country: United States
- State: Wisconsin
- County: Washburn

Area
  - Total: 20.8 sq mi (53.9 km^{2})
  - Land: 18.8 sq mi (48.8 km^{2})
  - Water: 2.0 sq mi (5.1 km^{2})
- Elevation: 1,089 ft (332 m)

Population (2020)
  - Total: 827
  - Density: 43.9/sq mi (16.9/km^{2})
- Time zone: UTC-6 (Central (CST))
  - Summer (DST): UTC-5 (CDT)
- Area codes: 715 & 534
- FIPS code: 55-75650
- GNIS feature ID: 1584188
- Website: http://www.townofspooner.com/

Spooner is a town in Washburn County, Wisconsin, United States. The population was 827 at the 2020 census. The City of Spooner is located mostly within the southwestern corner of the town.

== Geography ==
According to the United States Census Bureau, the town has a total area of 20.8 square miles (53.9 km^{2}), of which, 18.9 square miles (48.8 km^{2}) of it is land and 2.0 square miles (5.1 km^{2}) of it (9.41%) is water.

== Demographics ==
As of the census of 2000, there were 677 people, 259 households, and 203 families residing in the town. The population density was 35.9 people per square mile (13.9/km^{2}). There were 383 housing units at an average density of 20.3 per square mile (7.8/km^{2}). The racial makeup of the town was 96.31% White, 0.74% Black or African American, 1.18% Native American, 0.59% Asian, and 1.18% from two or more races. 1.03% of the population were Hispanic or Latino of any race.

There were 259 households, out of which 34.0% had children under the age of 18 living with them, 65.3% were married couples living together, 8.5% had a female householder with no husband present, and 21.6% were non-families. 18.1% of all households were made up of individuals, and 6.6% had someone living alone who was 65 years of age or older. The average household size was 2.61 and the average family size was 2.94.

In the town, the population was spread out, with 25.7% under the age of 18, 5.6% from 18 to 24, 24.4% from 25 to 44, 30.4% from 45 to 64, and 13.9% who were 65 years of age or older. The median age was 42 years. For every 100 females, there were 113.6 males. For every 100 females age 18 and over, there were 106.1 males.

The median income for a household in the town was $41,458, and the median income for a family was $44,375. Males had a median income of $31,136 versus $21,667 for females. The per capita income for the town was $17,133. About 5.2% of families and 4.9% of the population were below the poverty line, including 4.4% of those under age 18 and 5.8% of those age 65 or over.
