= Burkhardt, Wisconsin =

- Unincorporated community
- Location within Wisconsin Location within the United States
- Coordinates: 45°01′18″N 92°40′02″W
- Country: United States
- State: Wisconsin
- County: St. Croix County
- Elevation: 902 ft (275 m)
- Time zone: UTC-6 (Central (CST))
  - Summer (DST): UTC-5 (CDT)
- ZIP code: 54016
- Area code: 715
- GNIS feature ID: 1581602

Burkhardt is an unincorporated community in St. Croix County, Wisconsin, United States, located between the cities of Hudson and New Richmond in the town of St. Joseph.

== History ==
It was originally named Bouchea (possibly after Peter Bouchea, one of the first four settlers of Hudson), and was renamed in honor of Christian Burkhardt (1834-1931), owner and operator of the mills there, by Guy Dailey, during Dailey's single term representing the county in the Wisconsin State Assembly.
