= Richardson, Wisconsin =

- Unincorporated community
- Location within Wisconsin Location within the United States
- Coordinates: 45°19′09″N 92°12′00″W
- Country: United States
- State: Wisconsin
- County: Polk
- Elevation: 1,201 ft (366 m)
- Time zone: UTC-6 (Central (CST))
  - Summer (DST): UTC-5 (CDT)
- Area codes: 715 & 534
- GNIS feature ID: 1572280

Richardson is an unincorporated community located in the town of Clayton, Polk County, Wisconsin, United States.

== History ==
Richardson was originally called Marsh Lake; the present name was given in honor of Eugene Richardson, a pioneer settler. A post office called Marsh Lake was in operation from 1878 until 1879, and a post office called Richardson was in operation from 1881 until 1918.
