= Boardman, Wisconsin =

- Unincorporated community
- Location within Wisconsin Location within the United States
- Coordinates: 45°03′56″N 92°36′00″W
- Country: United States
- State: Wisconsin
- County: St. Croix County
- Elevation: 945 ft (288 m)
- Time zone: UTC-6 (Central (CST))
  - Summer (DST): UTC-5 (CDT)
- ZIP code: 54017
- Area codes: 715 & 534
- GNIS feature ID: 1581596

Boardman is an unincorporated community in St. Croix County, Wisconsin, United States, located just southwest of New Richmond on County Road A, in the town of Richmond.

== History ==
Boardman was named in 1853 for C. A. Boardman, an early settler. A post office called Boardman was established in 1862, and remained in operation until it was discontinued in 1954.
