= Kelly, Wisconsin =

- Town
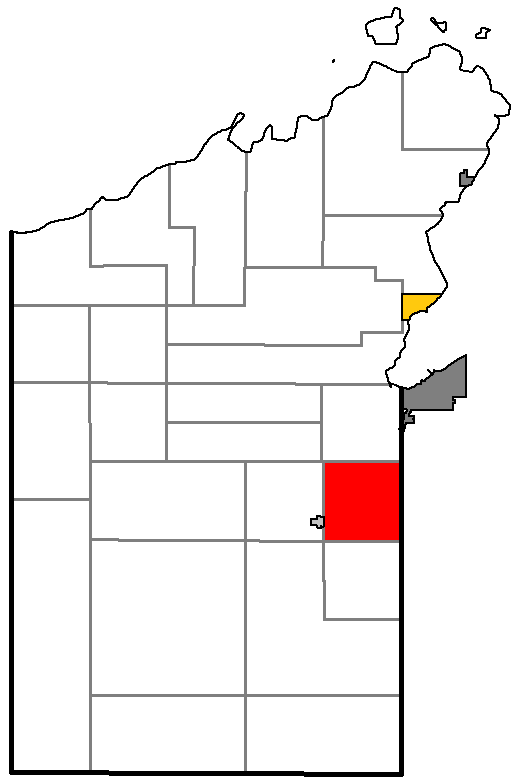
- Location of Kelly, within Bayfield County
- Coordinates: 46°26′20″N 90°59′51″W
- Country: United States
- State: Wisconsin
- County: Bayfield

Area
  - Total: 36.7 sq mi (95.0 km^{2})
  - Land: 36.7 sq mi (95.0 km^{2})
  - Water: 0 sq mi (0.0 km^{2})
- Elevation: 994 ft (303 m)

Population (2020)
  - Total: 436
  - Density: 11.9/sq mi (4.59/km^{2})
- Time zone: UTC-6 (Central (CST))
  - Summer (DST): UTC-5 (CDT)
- Area codes: 715 & 534
- FIPS code: 55-39025
- GNIS feature ID: 1583467
- Website: https://townofkellywi.org/

Kelly is a town in Bayfield County, Wisconsin, United States. The population was 436 at the 2020 census, down from 463 at the 2010 census.

== Geography ==
According to the United States Census Bureau, the town has a total area of 36.7 square miles (95.0 km^{2}), all land.

== Demographics ==
As of the census of 2000, there were 377 people, 140 households, and 112 families residing in the town. The population density was 10.3 people per square mile (4.0/km^{2}). There were 168 housing units at an average density of 4.6 per square mile (1.8/km^{2}). The racial makeup of the town was 95.23% White, 2.65% Native American, 0.27% Asian, 0.53% from other races, and 1.33% from two or more races. Hispanic or Latino of any race were 0.53% of the population.

There were 140 households, out of which 39.3% had children under the age of 18 living with them, 70.7% were married couples living together, 5.0% had a female householder with no husband present, and 20.0% were non-families. 17.9% of all households were made up of individuals, and 10.7% had someone living alone who was 65 years of age or older. The average household size was 2.69 and the average family size was 3.08.

In the town, the population was spread out, with 31.3% under the age of 18, 4.8% from 18 to 24, 26.5% from 25 to 44, 24.1% from 45 to 64, and 13.3% who were 65 years of age or older. The median age was 37 years. For every 100 females, there were 115.4 males. For every 100 females age 18 and over, there were 107.2 males.

The median income for a household in the town was $33,125, and the median income for a family was $37,857. Males had a median income of $34,000 versus $19,500 for females. The per capita income for the town was $15,525. About 16.1% of families and 17.4% of the population were below the poverty line, including 24.8% of those under age 18 and 17.1% of those age 65 or over.
