= Deer Park, Wisconsin =

- Village
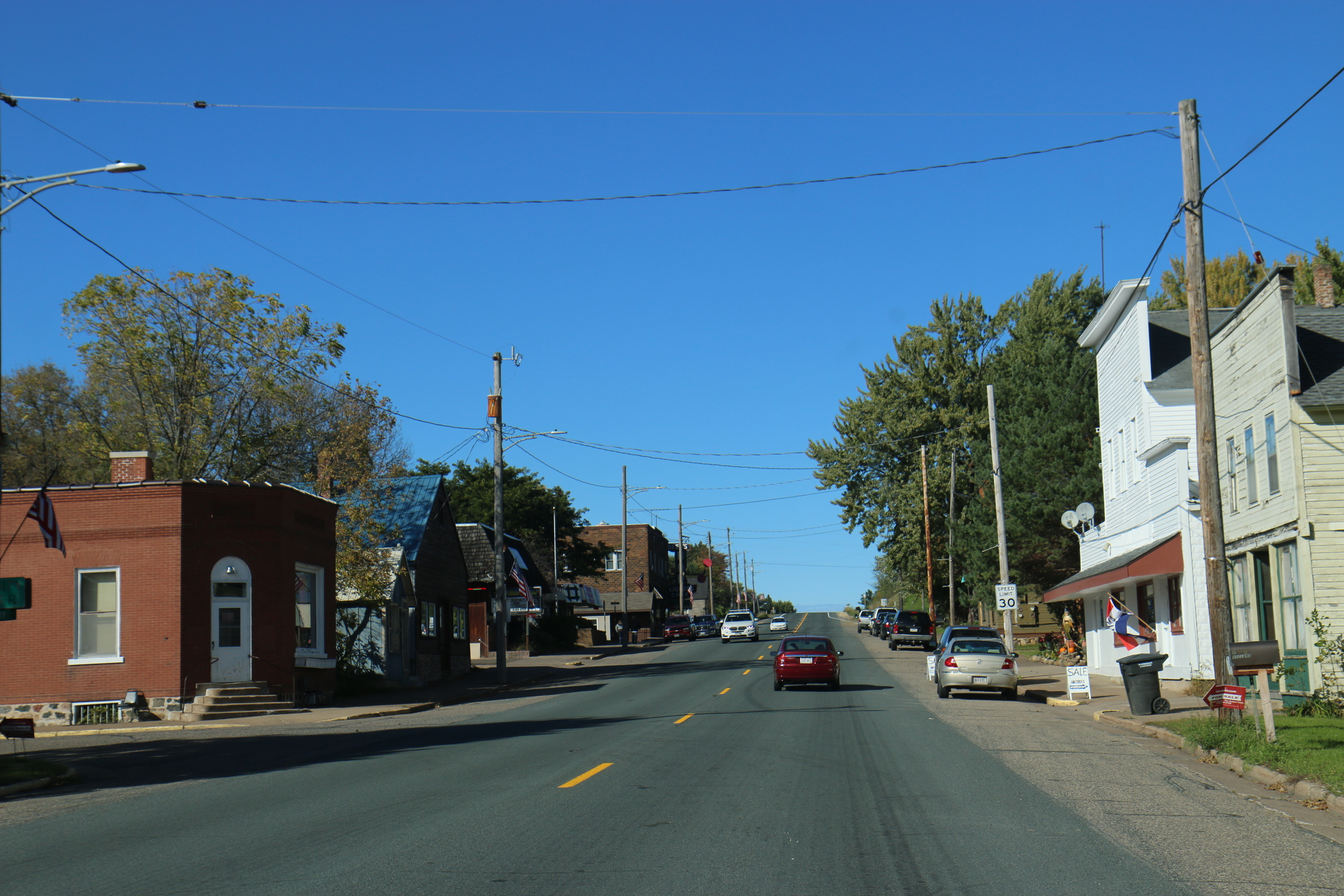
- Downtown Deer Park

- Location of Deer Park in St. Croix County, Wisconsin.
- Coordinates: 45°11′19″N 92°23′20″W
- Country: United States
- State: Wisconsin
- County: St. Croix

Area
  - Total: 0.95 sq mi (2.45 km^{2})
  - Land: 0.91 sq mi (2.36 km^{2})
  - Water: 0.035 sq mi (0.09 km^{2})
- Elevation: 1,056 ft (322 m)

Population (2020)
  - Total: 249
  - Density: 273/sq mi (106/km^{2})
- Time zone: UTC-6 (Central (CST))
  - Summer (DST): UTC-5 (CDT)
- Area codes: 715 & 534
- FIPS code: 55-19325
- GNIS feature ID: 1581620
- Website: deerparkwi.com

Deer Park is a village in St. Croix County, Wisconsin, United States. The population was 249 at the 2020 census.

== History ==
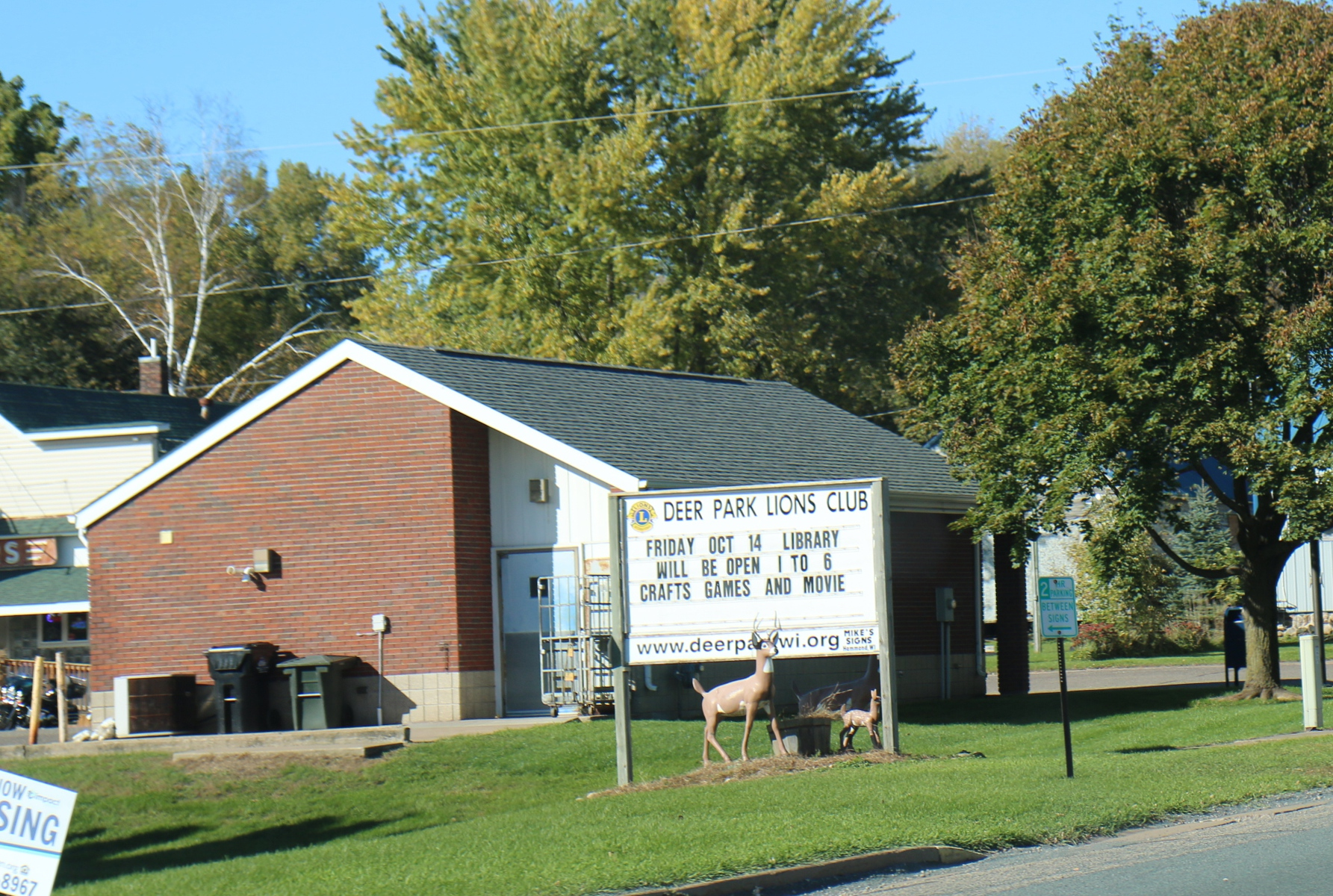
Post office

Deer Park was founded in 1876. The village was named after an early nature preserve for deer near the town site. A post office has been in operation in Deer Park since 1876.

== Geography ==
Deer Park is located at 45°11′19″N 92°23′20″W (45.188556, -92.388935). The village is located along Highway 46 and shares its Main street with Highway 46. The only other roads accessing the community are South Street West (also known as Gust Road although this name appears on only one road sign, outside the village limits at the junction of 200 Street and 225 Avenue) and 222 Avenue. Deer Park is located near the headwaters of the Willow River.

According to the United States Census Bureau, the village has a total area of 0.97 square miles (2.51 km^{2}), of which 0.93 square miles (2.41 km^{2}) is land and 0.04 square miles (0.10 km^{2}) is water.

== Demographics ==
Historical population
| Census | Pop. | Note | %± |
|---|---|---|---|
| 1880 | 56 | | — |
| 1920 | 233 | | — |
| 1930 | 187 | | −19.7% |
| 1940 | 203 | | 8.6% |
| 1950 | 226 | | 11.3% |
| 1960 | 221 | | −2.2% |
| 1970 | 217 | | −1.8% |
| 1980 | 232 | | 6.9% |
| 1990 | 237 | | 2.2% |
| 2000 | 227 | | −4.2% |
| 2010 | 216 | | −4.8% |
| 2020 | 249 | | 15.3% |
U.S. Decennial Census

=== 2010 census ===
As of the census of 2010, there were 216 people, 100 households, and 65 families living in the village. The population density was 232.3 inhabitants per square mile (89.7/km^{2}). There were 113 housing units at an average density of 121.5 per square mile (46.9/km^{2}). The racial makeup of the village was 97.7% White, 0.5% African American, 1.4% Asian, and 0.5% from other races. Hispanic or Latino of any race were 1.4% of the population.

There were 100 households, of which 26.0% had children under the age of 18 living with them, 49.0% were married couples living together, 8.0% had a female householder with no husband present, 8.0% had a male householder with no wife present, and 35.0% were non-families. 30.0% of all households were made up of individuals, and 13% had someone living alone who was 65 years of age or older. The average household size was 2.16 and the average family size was 2.65.

The median age in the village was 43.3 years. 19.4% of residents were under the age of 18; 6% were between the ages of 18 and 24; 26.9% were from 25 to 44; 26.4% were from 45 to 64; and 21.3% were 65 years of age or older. The gender makeup of the village was 50.5% male and 49.5% female.

=== 2000 census ===
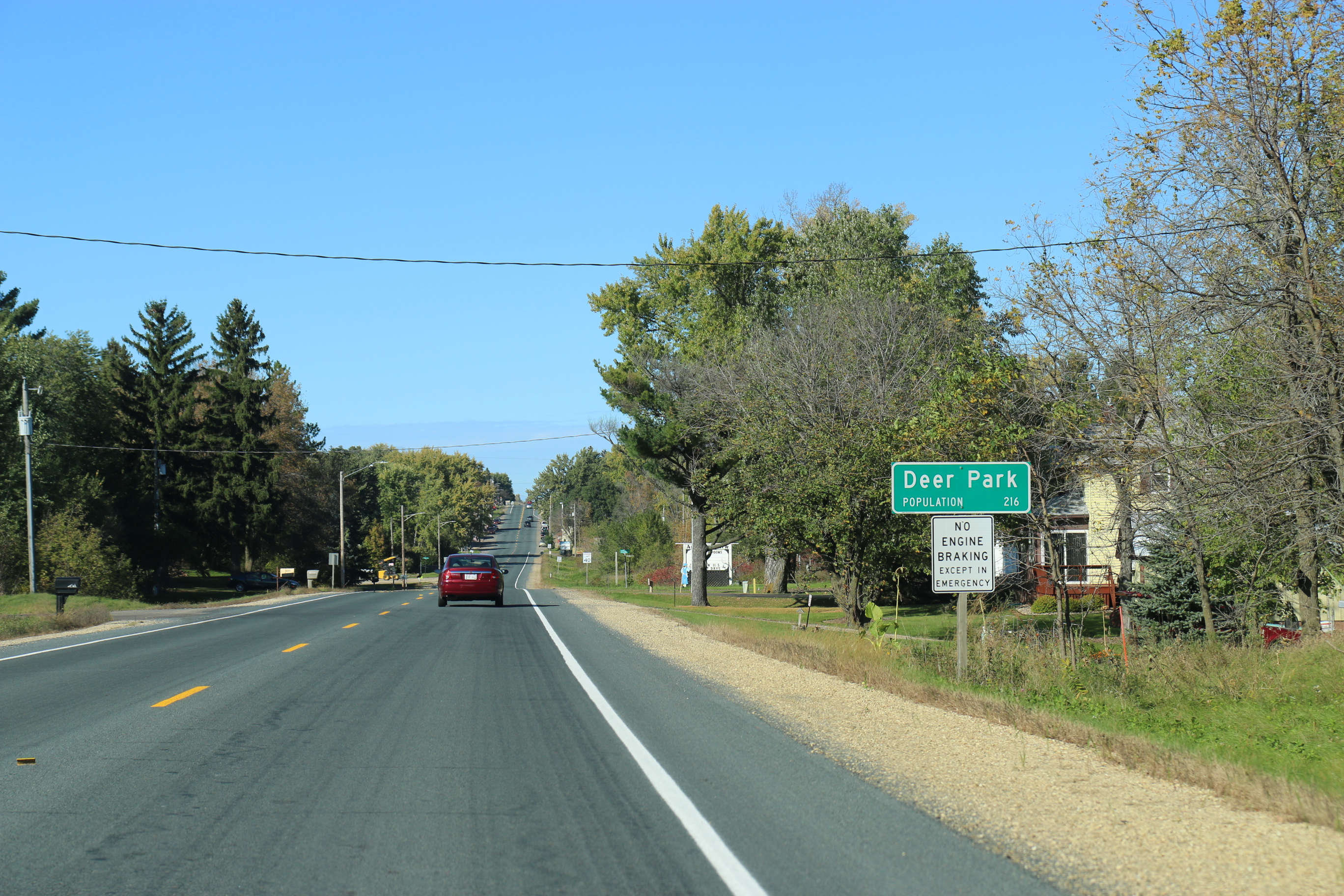
The sign for Deer Park

As of the census of 2000, there were 227 people, 91 households, and 62 families living in the village. The population density was 253.0 inhabitants per square mile (97.7/km^{2}). There were 94 housing units at an average density of 104.8 per square mile (40.5/km^{2}). The racial makeup of the village was 100.00% White.

There were 91 households, out of which 26.4% had children under the age of 18 living with them, 59.3% were married couples living together, 3.3% had a female householder with no husband present, and 30.8% were non-families. 25.3% of all households were made up of individuals, and 11.0% had someone living alone who was 65 years of age or older. The average household size was 2.49 and the average family size was 3.03.

In the village, the population was spread out, with 25.1% under the age of 18, 5.7% from 18 to 24, 32.6% from 25 to 44, 20.3% from 45 to 64, and 16.3% who were 65 years of age or older. The median age was 36 years. For every 100 females, there were 92.4 males. For every 100 females age 18 and over, there were 109.9 males.

The median income for a household in the village was $51,000, and the median income for a family was $54,583. Males had a median income of $40,208 versus $20,000 for females. The per capita income for the village was $17,367. About 2.6% of families and 4.9% of the population were below the poverty line, including none of those under the age of eighteen and 15.9% of those 65 or over.

== Notable people ==
- Ted Kleinhans, Major League Baseball pitcher; born in Deer Park

== See also ==
- List of villages in Wisconsin
