= Cylon, Wisconsin =

- Town
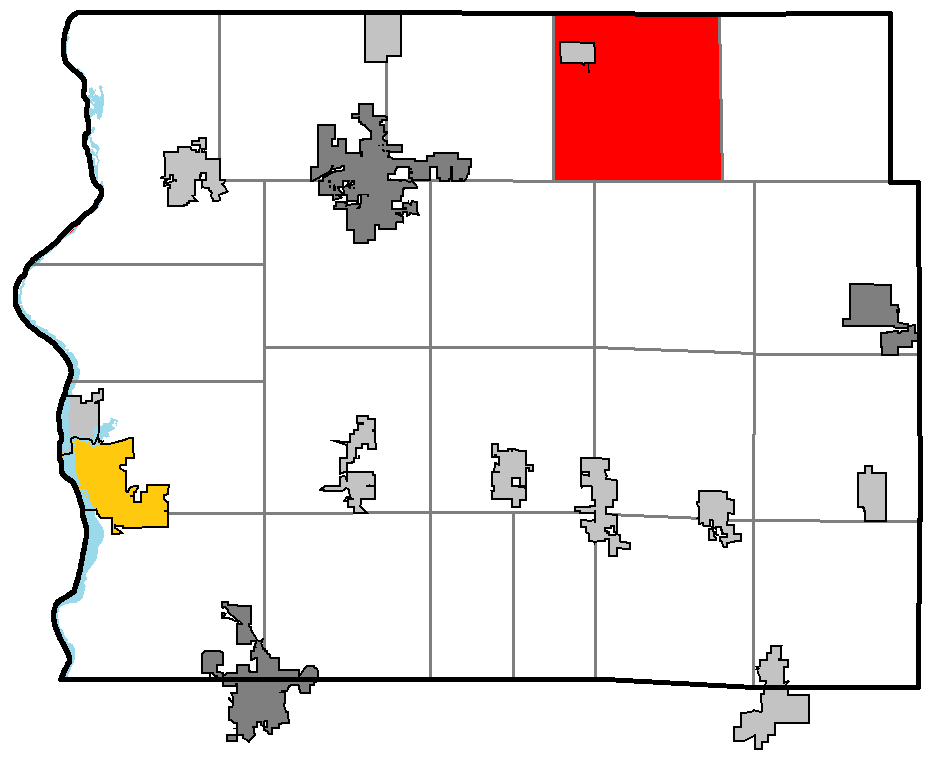
- Location of Cylon, within St. Croix County

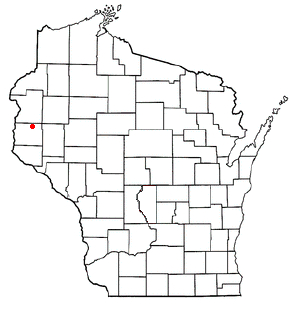
- Location of Cylon, Wisconsin
- Coordinates: 45°10′2″N 92°20′47″W
- Country: United States
- State: Wisconsin
- County: St. Croix

Area
  - Total: 35.4 sq mi (91.8 km^{2})
  - Land: 35.4 sq mi (91.6 km^{2})
  - Water: 0.077 sq mi (0.2 km^{2})
- Elevation: 1,080 ft (330 m)

Population (2020)
  - Total: 708
  - Density: 20.0/sq mi (7.73/km^{2})
- Time zone: UTC-6 (Central (CST))
  - Summer (DST): UTC-5 (CDT)
- Area codes: 715 & 534
- FIPS code: 55-18300
- GNIS feature ID: 1583041

Cylon is a town in St. Croix County, Wisconsin, United States. The population was recorded to be 708 as of the 2020 census.

== Geography ==
According to the United States Census Bureau, the town has a total area of 35.4 square miles (91.8 km^{2}), of which 35.3 square miles (91.6 km^{2}) is land and 0.1 square mile (0.2 km^{2}) (0.23%) is water.

== Demographics ==
Historical population
Census	Pop.	Note	%±
2010	683		—
2020	708		3.7%

As of the census of 2000, there were 629 people, 227 households, and 185 families residing in the town. The population density was 17.8 inhabitants per square mile (6.9/km^{2}). There were 232 housing units at an average density of 6.6 per square mile (2.5/km^{2}). The racial makeup of the town was 98.25% White, 0.16% Native American, 0.64% Asian, and 0.95% from two or more races. Hispanic or Latino of any race were 0.16% of the population.

There were 227 households, out of which 34.4% had children under the age of 18 living with them, 72.2% were married couples living together, 4.8% had a female householder with no husband present, and 18.5% were non-families. 16.3% of all households were made up of individuals, and 3.5% had someone living alone who was 65 years of age or older. The average household size was 2.77 and the average family size was 3.06.

In the town, the population was spread out, with 26.7% under the age of 18, 7.3% from 18 to 24, 28.6% from 25 to 44, 28.0% from 45 to 64, and 9.4% who were 65 years of age or older. The median age was 37 years. For every 100 females, there were 116.9 males. For every 100 females age 18 and over, there were 112.4 males.

The median income for a household in the town was $51,042, and the median income for a family was $50,750. Males had a median income of $32,105 versus $24,750 for females. The per capita income for the town was $21,213. About 4.1% of families and 5.7% of the population were below the poverty line, including 9.7% of those under age 18 and 7.3% of those age 65 or over.
