= Wisconsin's 74th Assembly district =

American legislative district in northwest Wisconsin

Wisconsin's 74th State Assembly district
- 2024 map defined in 2023 Wisc. Act 94; 2022 map defined in Johnson v. Wisconsin Elections Commission; 2011 map was defined in 2011 Wisc. Act 43
Assemblymember
| Chanz Green; R–Grandview |
since January 3, 2023 (11 years)
- Demographics: 89.93% White; 0.56% Black; 1.12% Hispanic; 0.47% Asian; 7.12% Native American; 0.09% Hawaiian/Pacific Islander
- Population (2020) • Voting age: 58,968; 48,431
- Website: Official website
- Notes: Northwest Wisconsin

The 74th Assembly district of Wisconsin is one of 99 districts in the Wisconsin State Assembly. Located in northwest Wisconsin, the district comprises all of Iron, Sawyer, and Washburn counties, along with most of Ashland County, the southern half of Bayfield County, the southern half of Douglas County, and part of northeast Burnett County. It includes the cities of Hayward, Hurley, Mellen, Montreal, Shell Lake, and Spooner, and the villages of Birchwood, Butternut, Couderay, Exeland, Mason, Minong, Radisson, Solon Springs, and Winter. The district also contains the and most of the Chequamegon National Forest. The district is represented by Republican Chanz Green, since January 2023.

The 74th Assembly district is located within Wisconsin's 25th Senate district, along with the 73rd and 75th Assembly districts. The district is also located entirely within Wisconsin's 7th congressional district.

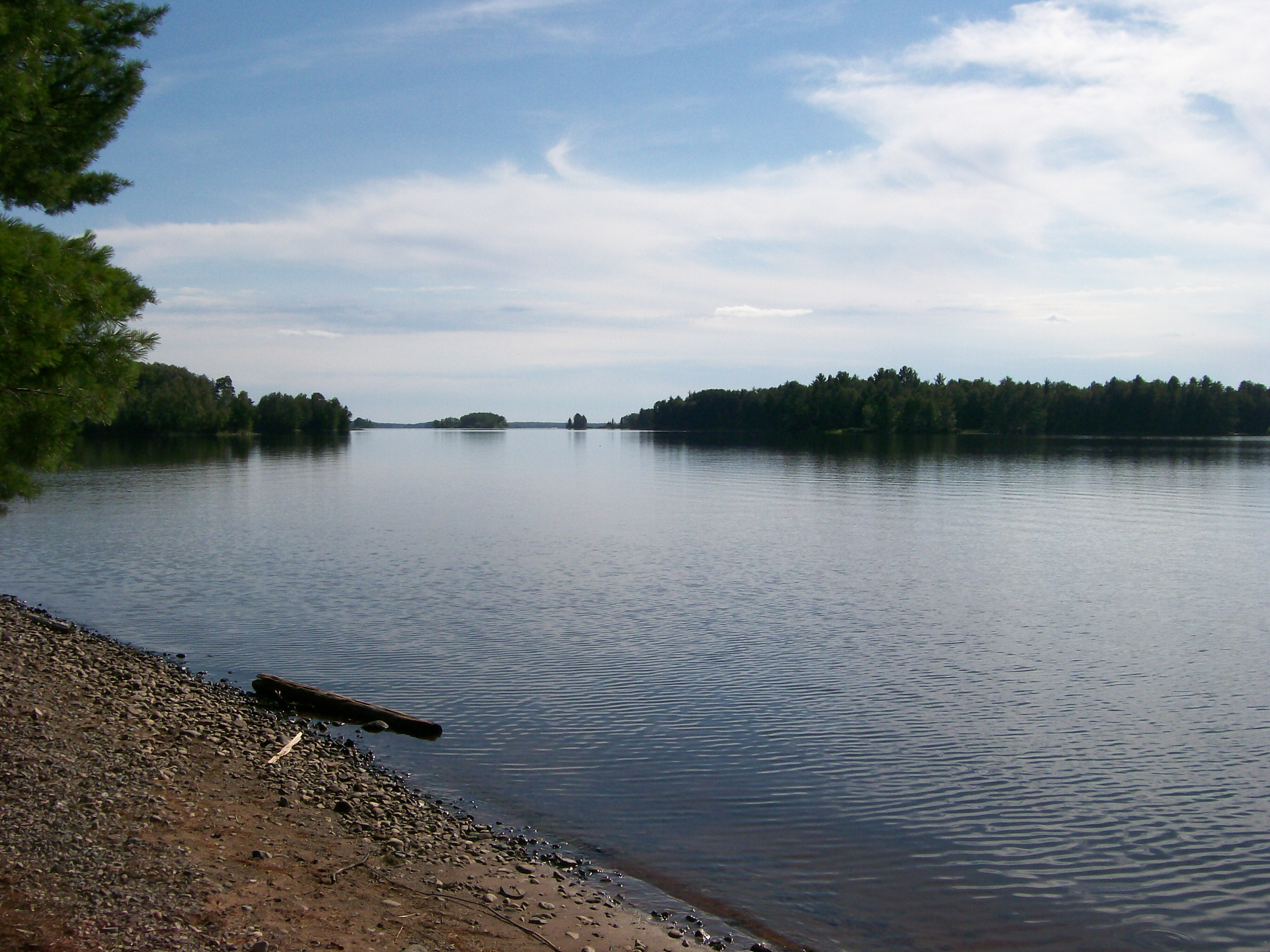
Turtle-Flambeau Flowage

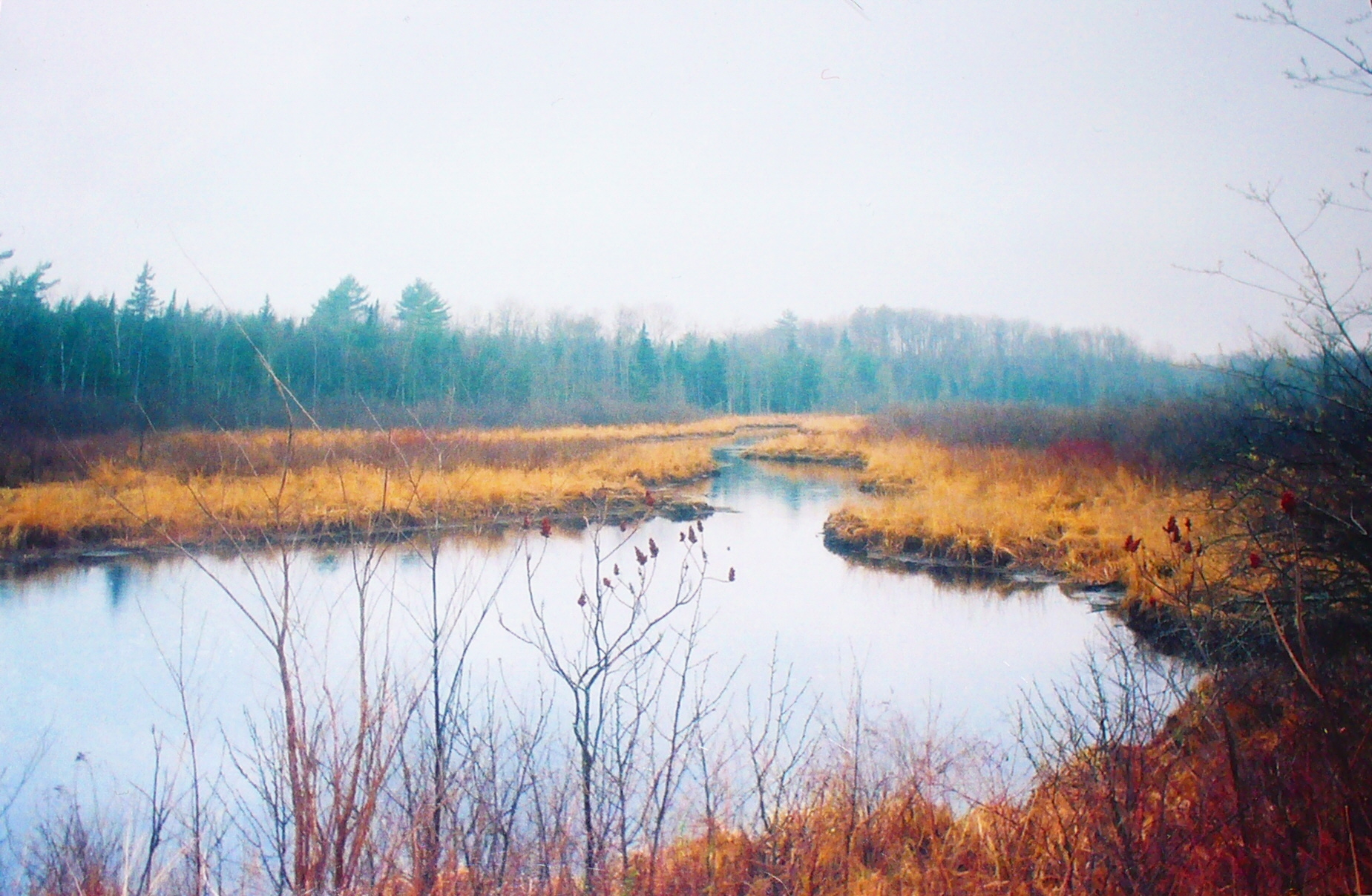
Near Clam Lake in Chequamegon National Forest

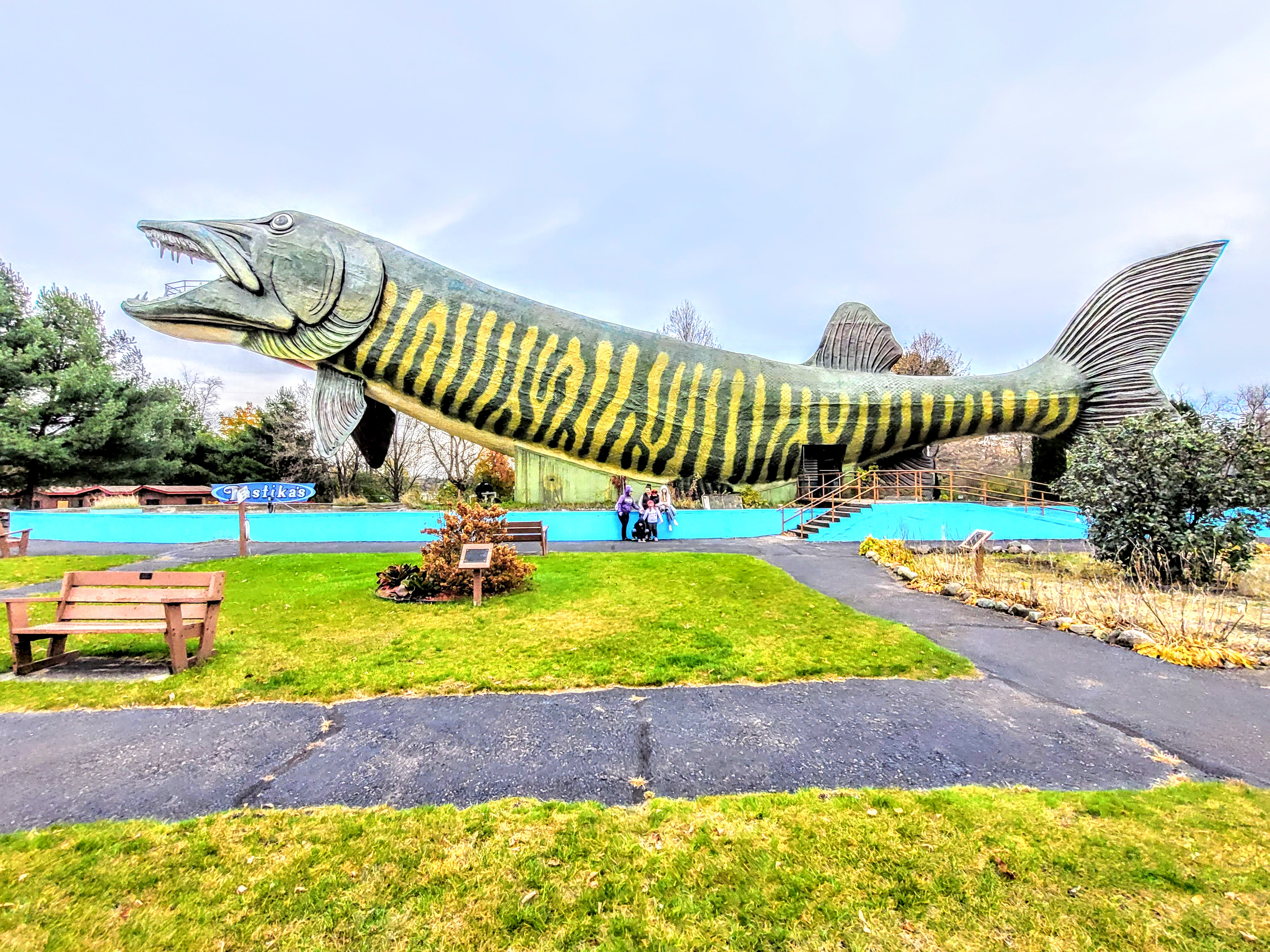
World's largest Muskie at the National Fresh Water Fishing Hall of Fame

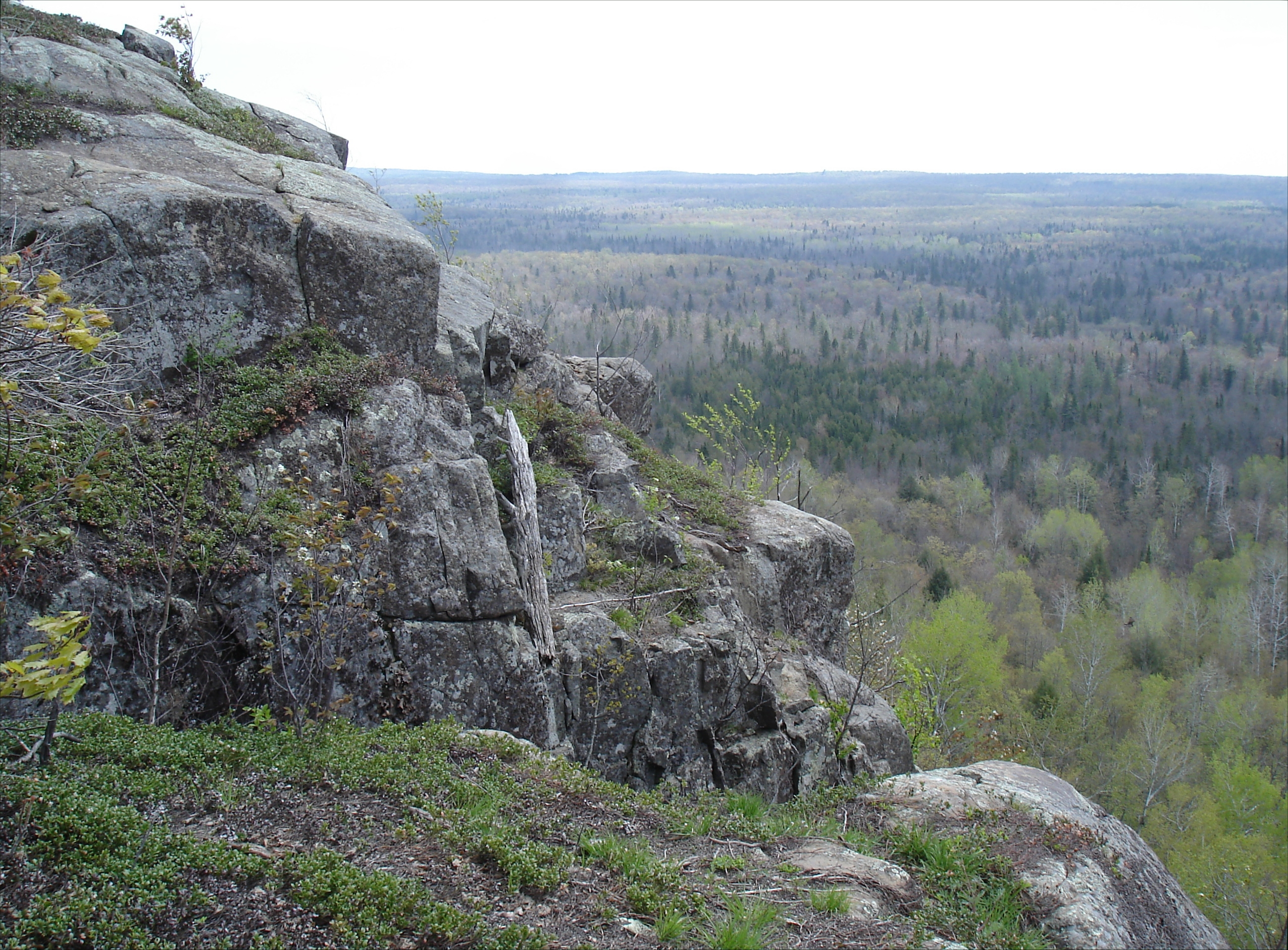
Penokee Bluff in Iron County Forest

== List of past representatives ==
List of representatives to the Wisconsin State Assembly from the 74th district
| Member | Party | Residence | Counties represented | Term start | Term end | Ref. |
|---|---|---|---|---|---|---|
District created
| David Kedrowski | Dem. | Washburn | Ashland, Bayfield, Price, Iron | January 1, 1973 | January 5, 1981 | |
| June Jaronitzky | Rep. | Tripp | Ashland, Bayfield, Price, Iron | January 5, 1981 | January 3, 1983 | |
| Dale Bolle | Dem. | Whitelaw | Brown, Calumet, Manitowoc | January 3, 1983 | January 7, 1985 | |
| William Plizka | Rep. | Mellen | Ashland, Bayfield, Iron, Rusk, Sawyer | January 7, 1985 | January 5, 1987 | |
| Barbara Linton | Dem. | Ashland | Ashland, Bayfield, Iron, Rusk, Sawyer | January 5, 1987 | July 31, 1998 | |
| Barbara Linton | Dem. | Ashland | Ashland, Bayfield, Iron, Sawyer | January 5, 1987 | July 31, 1998 | |
| --Vacant-- | | | Ashland, Bayfield, Iron, Sawyer | July 31, 1998 | January 4, 1999 | |
| Gary E. Sherman | Dem. | Port Wing | Ashland, Bayfield, Iron, Sawyer | January 4, 1999 | May 12, 2010 | |
| --Vacant-- | | | Ashland, Bayfield, Iron, Sawyer | May 12, 2010 | January 3, 2011 | |
| Janet Bewley | Dem. | Ashland | Ashland, Bayfield, Douglas, Price, Iron, Sawyer, Vilas | January 3, 2011 | January 5, 2015 | |
| Beth Meyers | Dem. | Bayfield | Ashland, Bayfield, Douglas, Price, Iron, Sawyer, Vilas | January 5, 2015 | January 2, 2023 | |
| Chanz Green | Rep. | Mason | Ashland, Bayfield, Douglas, Price, Iron, Sawyer | January 3, 2023 | January 6, 2025 | |
| Chanz Green | Rep. | Grandview | Ashland, Bayfield, Burnett, Douglas, Iron, Sawyer, Washburn | January 6, 2025 | Current | |

== Electoral history ==
| Year | Date | Elected | | | | Defeated | | | | Total | Plurality | Other primary candidates |
|---|---|---|---|---|---|---|---|---|---|---|---|---|
| 2014 | Nov. 4 | Beth Meyers | Democratic | 14,663 | 57.43% | Jamey Francis | Rep. | 10,862 | 42.54% | 25,532 | 3,801 | Graham F. Garfield (Dem.) |
| 2016 | Nov. 6 | Beth Meyers (inc) | Democratic | 22,624 | 99.36% | --unopposed-- | | | | 22,769 | 22,479 | |
| 2018 | Nov. 6 | Beth Meyers (inc) | Democratic | 15,738 | 56.16% | Jeffrey Fahl | Rep. | 12,276 | 43.81% | 28,022 | 3,462 | |
| 2020 | Nov. 3 | Beth Meyers (inc) | Democratic | 18,163 | 51.46% | James Bolen | Rep. | 17,119 | 48.51% | 35,293 | 1,044 | |
| 2022 | Nov. 8 | Chanz Green | Republican | 16,006 | 52.84% | John Adams | Dem. | 14,276 | 47.13% | 30,293 | 1,730 | John A. Schey (Rep.) |
| 2024 | Nov. 5 | Chanz J. Green (inc) | Republican | 23,396 | 62.44% | Jeanne Rand Bruce | Dem. | 14,051 | 37.50% | 37,468 | 9,345 | Scott Allen Harbridge (Rep.) |
