= Senator Bewley =

Senator Bewley may refer to:

- Janet Bewley (Wisconsin politician) (born 1951), Wisconsin State Senate
- William Bewley (New York politician) (1878–1953), New York State Senate
