= David G. Deininger =

1st chairman of the Wisconsin Government Accountability Board

The Honorable David G. Deininger

Chairman of the Wisconsin Government Accountability Board
- In office January 10, 2008 – April 2008
- Appointed by: Jim Doyle
- Preceded by: Position established
- Succeeded by: Michael W. Brennan

Judge of the Wisconsin Court of Appeals District IV
- In office August 1996 – January 31, 2007
- Appointed by: Tommy Thompson
- Preceded by: Robert D. Sundby
- Succeeded by: Burnie Bridge

Wisconsin Circuit Court Judge for the Green Circuit
- In office August 1, 1994 – August 1996
- Preceded by: John Callahan
- Succeeded by: James R. Beer

Member of the Wisconsin State Assembly
- In office January 1, 1993 – August 1, 1994
- Preceded by: Eugene Hahn
- Succeeded by: Mike Powers
- Constituency: 80th district
- In office January 1, 1987 – January 1, 1993
- Preceded by: John T. Manske
- Succeeded by: Eugene Hahn
- Constituency: 47th district

Personal details
- Born: July 9, 1947 (age 79) Monroe, Wisconsin
- Party: Republican
- Spouse: Mary Deininger
- Children: Emilie Deininger^{(died 2006)}; 2 others
- Education: United States Naval Academy, University of Chicago, University of Wisconsin Law School
- Profession: Politician, Jurist

Military service
- Allegiance: United States
- Branch/service: United States Navy
- Years of service: 1969-1975

David G. Deininger (born July 9, 1947) is a retired Republican politician and jurist from Wisconsin. He served as a judge on the Wisconsin Court of Appeals for eleven years, from 1996 to 2007, and now serves as a reserve judge. He was the first chairman of the Wisconsin Government Accountability Board, appointed by Democratic Governor Jim Doyle. Earlier in his career, he served three and a half terms in the Wisconsin State Assembly, representing parts of Green and Rock counties, and was a Wisconsin Circuit Court Judge in Green County.

== Early life and career ==
Born in Monroe, Wisconsin, Deininger graduated from Monroe High School and went to the United States Naval Academy. He graduated in 1969 and was a nuclear submarine officer in the United States Navy until 1975. He attended the University of Chicago before graduating from the University of Wisconsin Law School in 1978. He began practicing law after graduation.

== Public offices ==
In 1986, Deininger launched a primary challenge against three-term incumbent Republican John T. Manske for his seat in the Wisconsin State Assembly. The district at the time was composed of parts of Green County, of which Deininger was a resident, and Rock County, where Manske resided. In the 1984 election, Deininger had worked for Manske's re-election campaign, but declared in 1986 that it was "Green County's turn to be represented in the Assembly." Deininger won a surprising upset in the September primary and was then unopposed in the general election. He was re-elected in 1988, and 1990, and after redistricting in 1991, was elected to another term in 1992.

In 1994, he ran unopposed for election to the Wisconsin Circuit Court in Green County, and resigned from the Wisconsin Assembly. Only two years later, in 1996, he was appointed to the Wisconsin Court of Appeals by Governor Tommy Thompson to fill the vacancy created by the retirement of Judge Robert D. Sundby. He was elected to two six-year terms on the Court of Appeals, in 1997 and 2003, but retired in 2007.

=== Government Accountability Board ===
In 2008, Deininger was appointed to the Wisconsin Government Accountability Board (GAB), by Governor Jim Doyle, and served as the GAB's first chairman. The Attorney General found that even though Deininger had retired from the Court of Appeals, he was ineligible to serve on the GAB because the term he was elected to had not expired. Following the Attorney General's finding, Deininer resigned from the Board.

Governor Doyle reappointed Deininger to the GAB in 2010. Governor Scott Walker reappointed him to the GAB to serve until 2016, but withdrew his appointment in November 2013, citing concerns that the Wisconsin Senate would not approve the appointment.

== After retirement ==
Deininger now serves as a reserve judge. He and his wife Mary reside in Monroe, and are raising their grandson Emerson following the death of their daughter.

== Electoral history ==
=== Wisconsin Assembly (1986, 1988, 1990, 1992) ===
Wisconsin Assembly, 47th District Election, 1986
Party	Candidate	Votes	%	±%
Republican Primary, September 9, 1986
Republican	David G. Deininger	2,602	50.42%	
Republican	John T. Manske (incumbent)	1,708	33.09%	
Republican	Paul M. Flater	781	15.13%	
Republican	Theresa M. Bregenzer	70	1.36%	
Plurality		894	17.32%	
Total votes		5,161	100.0%	
General Election, November 4, 1986
Republican	David G. Deininger	9,174	100.0%	
Total votes		9,174	100.0%	-53.01%
Republican hold				

Wisconsin State Assembly
Preceded by John T. Manske	Member of the Wisconsin State Assembly from the 47th district January 1, 1987 – January 1, 1993	Succeeded by Eugene Hahn
Preceded by Eugene Hahn	Member of the Wisconsin State Assembly from the 80th district January 1, 1993 – August 1, 1994	Succeeded by Mike Powers
Legal offices
Preceded by John Callahan	Wisconsin Circuit Court Judge for the Green Circuit; 1994 – 1996	Succeeded by James R. Beer
Preceded by Robert D. Sundby	Judge of the Wisconsin Court of Appeals District IV; 1996 – 2007	Succeeded by Burnie Bridge
New board	Chairman of the Wisconsin Government Accountability Board; January 10, 2008 – April 2008	Succeeded by Michael W. Brennan
