= Beth Meyers =

American politician (born 1959)

Member of the Wisconsin State Assembly from the 74th district
- In office January 5, 2015 – January 2, 2023
- Preceded by: Janet Bewley
- Succeeded by: Chanz Green

Personal details
- Born: May 29, 1959 (age 67) Bayfield, Wisconsin
- Party: Democratic
- Spouse: Kevin Buzicky
- Children: 2
- Education: Northland College (B.S.)

Beth Meyers (born May 29, 1959) is an American social worker and Democratic politician. She was a member of the Wisconsin State Assembly from 2015 through 2023, representing the 74th Assembly district, in northern Wisconsin.

== Early life and career ==
Meyers was born in Ashland, Wisconsin on May 29, 1959. During her teenage years she attended Bayfield High School, graduating in 1977. After high school Meyers became married and had two children, though divorced her husband at some point. In 1985 she began attending Northland College, graduating in December 1989 with a bachelor's of science. In 1990 she began working for the Red Cliff Band of Lake Superior Chippewa, whom she worked with until 1999, when she had become the Family Services Division Chief for the tribe. After her work with the tribe she began working for CORE Community Resources, which provided aid to senior citizens in the Chequamegon Bay area.

In 2010 Meyers was elected to the Bayfield County Board of Supervisors. Her district included her hometown of Russell, Wisconsin, as well as the Red Cliff Band of Lake Superior Chippewa. In 2013, Meyers voted with 10 other members of the county board to oppose legislation authorizing a mine in the hills of Penokee, Wisconsin. On April 1, 2015, she resigned her seat on the County Board of Supervisors following her election to the State Assembly.

== Political career ==
In 2014 Meyers announced a campaign for the seat being vacated by Democrat Janet Bewley, who was running for state senate. As part of her campaign, Meyers expressed opposition to a mine being constructed in Penokee, Wisconsin. She faced Graham Garfield, a college graduate and member of the Barack Obama 2008 presidential campaign. Both candidates agreed on several issues, such as opposing the Penokee hills mine, encouraging small businesses to open up in the region, and increasing funding for public education. The two candidates differed, however, on the topic of student loan forgiveness, with Meyers expressing support and Graham supporting increased options for loan repayment. Meyers defeated Graham by a 31 point margin. Meyers went on to defeat Republican Jamey Francis in the general election by a 15 point margin. She was sworn in on January 5, 2015.

In 2015, Meyers was elected to be the Democratic Caucus Secretary in the State Assembly, a position she held until 2023 when she left the state legislature.

In 2016, after the previous year's legislative session on the budget lasted 12 hours, extending into the early morning of the day after it began, Meyers proposed a bill which would require votes on the budget to happen during "normal waking hours", so that citizens would be able to observe the debates and votes.

In 2016, Meyers was re-elected unopposed.

Myers was re-elected to a third term in 2018, defeating Republican Jeffrey Fahl by a 13 point margin.

In October 2020, Meyers was appointed by Wisconsin Attorney General Josh Kaul to the Wisconsin Department of Justice's newly created Murdered Indigenous Women Task Force.

During the 2020 election, Meyers was included in the Democratic Legislative Campaign Committee's list of "spotlight candidates" that were part of an effort to preserve Governor Tony Evers' veto. Meyers' race also gained notoriety as her district had also previously voted for president Donald Trump in 2016, and was viewed by Republicans as a prime opportunity to gain seats. During the campaign she was backed by the Working Families Party of Wisconsin. She also supported state investment to help northern Wisconsin recover economically from the pandemic. Meyers defeated Republican James Bolen in the closest race of her career, defeating him by a 3 point margin.

Meyers supported Governor Tony Evers's attempt to expand BadgerCare, which she considered useful for the recovery from the COVID-19 pandemic, stating, "[W]e have a shortage of workers in this state. And what we need is for them to be healthy. We can’t have people who are supposed to be going to their job calling in sick … If their employer can’t provide them health care, we should be able to help them with this money."

On January 6, 2022, she announced that she would not seek re-election.

== Personal life ==
Meyers had two children and was divorced prior to attending college. She lives in Russell, Wisconsin, with her husband, Kevin Buzicky.

== Electoral history ==
=== Wisconsin Assembly (2014–2020) ===
Year	Type	Date	Elected				Defeated				Total	Plurality
2014	Primary	Aug. 12	Beth Meyers	Democratic	3,092	65.40%	Graham F. Garfield	Dem.	1,636	34.60%	4,728	1,456
2014	General	Nov. 4	Beth Meyers	Democratic	14,663	57.43%	Jamey Francis	Rep.	10,862	42.54%	25,532	3,801
2016	General	Nov. 6	Beth Meyers (inc)	Democratic	22,624	99.36%	--unopposed--				22,769	22,479
2018	General	Nov. 6	Beth Meyers (inc)	Democratic	15,738	56.16%	Jeffrey Fahl	Rep.	12,276	43.81%	28,022	3,462
2020	General	Nov. 3	Beth Meyers (inc)	Democratic	18,163	51.46%	James Bolen	Rep.	17,119	48.51%	35,293	1,044

Wisconsin State Assembly
Preceded by Janet Bewley	Member of the Wisconsin State Assembly from the 74th district January 5, 2015 – January 2, 2023	Succeeded by Chanz Green
