= Wakefield Hall =

- U.S. National Register of Historic Places
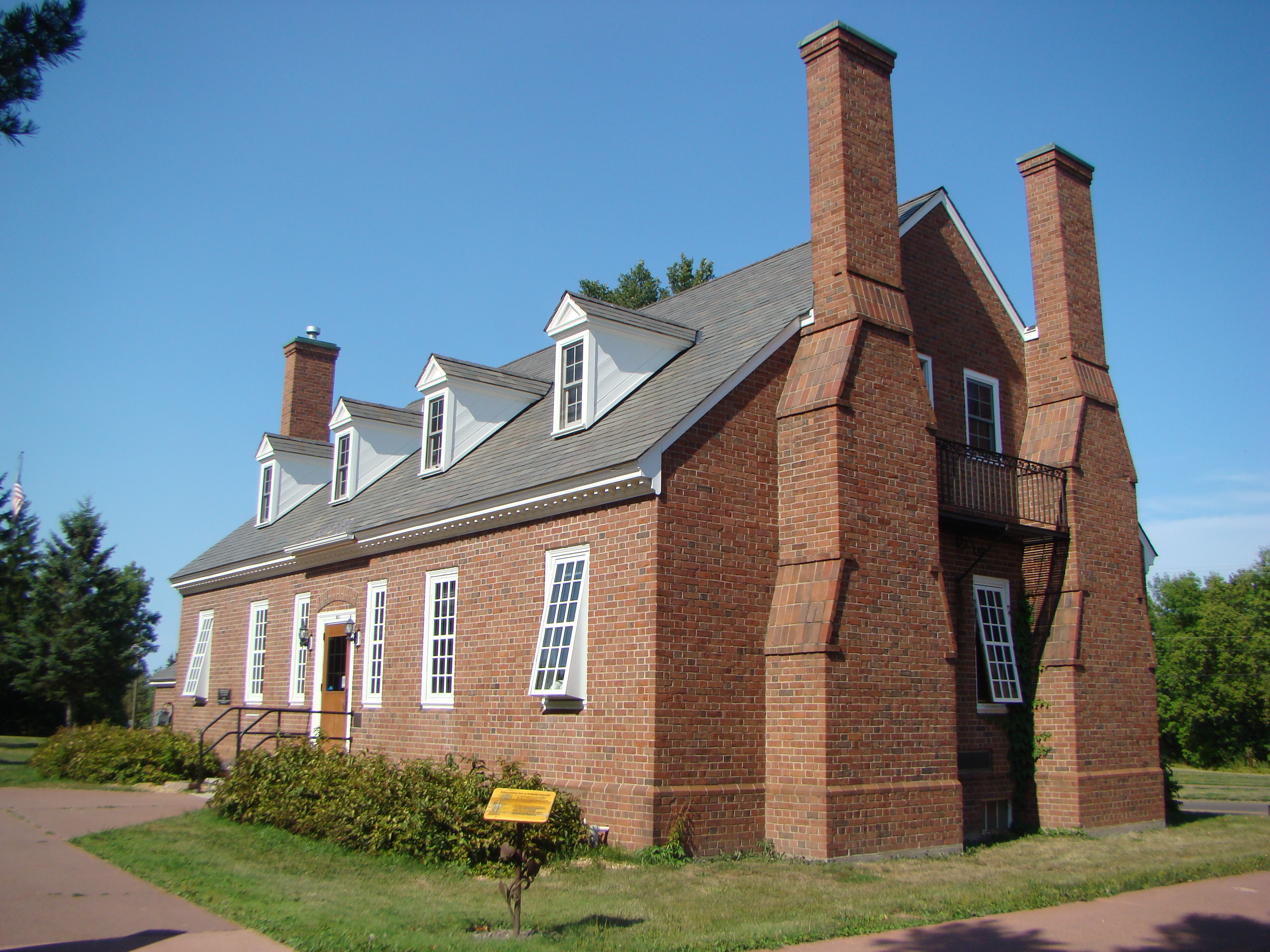
- Wakefield Hall
- Location: 1409 Ellis Ave. Ashland, Wisconsin
- Built: 1940-1941
- Architect: Thomas Shefchik
- Architectural style: Georgian Revival
- NRHP reference No.: 95000466
- Added to NRHP: May 4, 1995

Wakefield Hall is located in Ashland, Wisconsin.

== History ==
Wakefield Hall was originally built to be a new library for Northland College. Its exterior was based on George Washington's birthplace. Plans were made in advance for the building to be converted into offices once the college needed a bigger library.

The plans came to fruition in 1969, when a new library opened and this building was turned into administrative offices. Currently, it houses the admissions office. It was added to the State and the National Register of Historic Places in 1995.
