= Robert D. Sundby =

American judge

The Honorable Robert D. Sundby
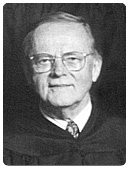

Judge of the Wisconsin Court of Appeals District IV
- In office August 1, 1986 – July 31, 1996
- Preceded by: Position Established
- Succeeded by: David G. Deininger

Personal details
- Born: October 21, 1925 Dunkirk, Wisconsin
- Died: December 12, 1997 (aged 72) Madison, Wisconsin
- Cause of death: Cancer
- Spouses: Beverly Hocking (m. 1946); MaryAnn Ostrander (m. 1953); Analee Grove (m. 1989–1997)
- Children: Michael, Dana, Scott, Debra
- Education: University of Wisconsin Law School

Military service
- Allegiance: United States
- Branch/service: United States Navy; U.S. Navy Reserve
- Years of service: 1943–1946
- Rank: Ensign
- Battles/wars: World War II

Robert D. Sundby (October 21, 1925 – December 12, 1997) was an American lawyer and jurist. He was a judge of the Wisconsin Court of Appeals in the Madison-based District IV for ten years (1986–1996).

== Early life and education ==
Born in the rural town of Dunkirk, Wisconsin, just south of Stoughton, Sundby was raised on a small farm and graduated from Stoughton High School in 1943. He enrolled in the United States Navy's V-12 Navy College Training Program, designed to supplement the Navy's commissioned officer corps. Through the V-12 program, Sundby was educated at the University of Illinois at Urbana–Champaign College of Engineering and the University of Texas. He graduated from the program October 30, 1945, received his commission as an ensign, and was sent to Naval Amphibious Base Coronado for amphibious warfare training. Following his training, he was assigned to Naval Station Great Lakes, but, with World War II now over, Ensign Sundby was soon sent home and placed on inactive reserve.

Returning to Wisconsin, Sundby immediately entered the University of Wisconsin Law School, where he graduated in 1949.

== Legal career ==
As general counsel for the League of Wisconsin Municipalities from 1950 to 1960, he gained expertise in municipal law and drafted much related legislation. Throughout the years 1960 to 1986 he was an associate and partner in the Madison law firm now known as DeWitt LLP, though at the time rotated through several names. At the time of his departure to the Appeals Court in 1986, it was DeWitt, Sundby, Huggett, Schumacher & Morgan. Sundby also served as City Attorney of Monona, Wisconsin, from 1970 to 1981, and of Evansville, Wisconsin, from 1975 to 1985.

== Judicial career ==
When a new seat was created in District IV of the Wisconsin Court of Appeals, Sundby decided to run. In what, at the time, was considered a stunning upset, he defeated veteran Dane County Judge P. Charles Jones in the April election. He was subsequently re-elected without opposition in 1991. In 1996, Judge Sundby announced his plans to retire at the end of the 1995–1996 court term.

== Personal life and family ==
Sundby was married three times. He married his first wife, Beverly Hocking, of Janesville, Wisconsin, in October 1946, shortly after returning from Naval duty. Sundby later married MaryAnn Ostrander, with whom he had four children: Michael, Dana, Scott, and Debra. His second marriage ended in divorce. In 1989, he married Analee "Casey" Grove, becoming step-father to Richard and Jim Grove.

He died of cancer in December 1997, 18 months after retiring from the judiciary.

== Electoral history ==
Wisconsin Court of Appeals, District IV Election, 1986
Party	Candidate	Votes	%	±%
General Election, April, 1986
Nonpartisan	Robert D. Sundby	76,201	52.98%	
Nonpartisan	P. Charles Jones	67,636	47.02%	
Plurality		8,565	5.95%	
Total votes		143,837	100.0%	

Legal offices
New seat	Judge of the Wisconsin Court of Appeals District IV; August 1, 1986 – July 31, 1996	Succeeded by David G. Deininger
