= Eco League =

The EcoLeague is a five-college consortium consisting of Alaska Pacific University in Anchorage, Alaska; New College of Florida in Sarasota, Florida; Prescott College in Prescott, Arizona; College of the Atlantic in Bar Harbor, Maine; and Dickinson College in Carlisle, Pennsylvania.

== Programs ==
The EcoLeague offers studies in ecology, conservation biology, marine biology, and natural and cultural history interpretation, sustainable business.

The consortium is unique in that each college is in a different geographic area. Despite a wide variation in structure and culture, the five colleges have strong programs in environmental studies. The idea behind the consortium is the ability to experience learning in virtually every major biome of the United States, based on their mission of promoting a "bio-regional education for sustainability".

== History ==
The EcoLeague was founded as a result of a visionary call from students with a proposal improve academic collaboration and mobility related to urgent issues of global sustainability. The consortium design, including student and faculty exchange program and regular cross-college conferences, was first founded by students at Prescott College who articulated the original vision in 1996 and convened colleges under the consortium as the North American Alliance for Green Education (NAAGE), and later rebranded as “the Eco-8” and then "the Eco League". These institutions included Northland College in Ashland, Wisconsin; Prescott College in Prescott, Arizona; College of the Atlantic in Bar Harbor, Maine; and a later addition was Dickinson College in Carlisle, Pennsylvania. Former consortium members included Antioch College, Green Mountain College, Naropa University, Northland College, Sterling College, Unity College and Warren Wilson College, and Audubon Expedition Institute.
