= Ballou, Wisconsin =

- Unincorporated community
- Location within Wisconsin Location within the United States
- Coordinates: 46°19′03″N 90°35′05″W
- Country: United States
- State: Wisconsin
- County: Ashland
- Town: Morse
- Elevation: 1,424 ft (434 m)
- Time zone: UTC-6 (Central (CST))
  - Summer (DST): UTC-5 (CDT)
- Area codes: 715 & 534
- GNIS feature ID: 1577501

Ballou is an unincorporated community located in the town of Morse, Ashland County, Wisconsin, United States. The community was established circa 1890 by the Wisconsin Central railroad. It was named for Miner H. Ballou, the treasurer and general manager of the Menasha Paper Company and a director of the railroad.
