= WRNC-LP =

Coordinates: 46.580°N 90.875°W

- Ashland, Wisconsin; United States
- Frequency: 97.7 MHz (FM)

Programming
- Format: Freeform; college radio
- Affiliations: Pacifica Radio

Ownership
- Owner: Northland College

History
- First air date: May 2005
- Last air date: May 23, 2017
- Call sign meaning: "We Are Northland College"

Technical information
- Licensing authority: FCC
- Facility ID: 131525
- Class: L1
- ERP: 100 watts
- HAAT: 21 meters (69 ft)

Links
- Public license information: LMS

WRNC-LP was a student-owned, freeform radio station on 97.7 MHz, and served the Chequamegon Bay area from the campus of Northland College in Ashland, Wisconsin.

WRNC began in 1995 as a student initiative initially began broadcasting in 1998 at 25 milliwatts. Soon after the station began broadcasting, student organizers discovered that licensing paperwork had never been filed with the Federal Communications Commission (FCC), which led to an end of broadcasting for the new station.

In 2001, an LPFM tower construction permit was drafted and filed with the FCC. In 2003, Northland College was granted a 100-watt, low-power frequency to begin broadcasting in December of that year.

WRNC-LP, in its latest incarnation, began broadcasting in May 2005. The station featured a variety of programming and operated 24 hours a day. The station also webcast its programming via its website.

WRNC-LP ceased operations on or about May 23, 2017. The closure of the radio station was due to budget cutbacks, at a time when the college was attempting to find solutions to a severe budget shortfall. Its license expired December 1, 2020.
