= William Plizka =

American politician (1944–2025)

Member of the Wisconsin State Assembly from the 74th district
- In office January 7, 1985 – January 5, 1987
- Preceded by: June Jaronitzky
- Succeeded by: Barbara Linton

Personal details
- Born: December 8, 1944 Ashland, Wisconsin, U.S.
- Died: September 3, 2025 (aged 80) Ashland, Wisconsin, U.S.
- Party: Republican
- Education: Northland College
- Profession: Real estate broker

William G. Plizka (December 8, 1944 – September 3, 2025) was a Republican politician and legislator from Wisconsin.

Born in Ashland, Wisconsin, Plizka graduated from Northland College in 1969. He served in the Wisconsin State Assembly for one term. He was a former member of the local school board, as well as the Ashland County Board.

He died on September 3, 2025, at the age of 80.
