= Morse, Wisconsin =

- Town
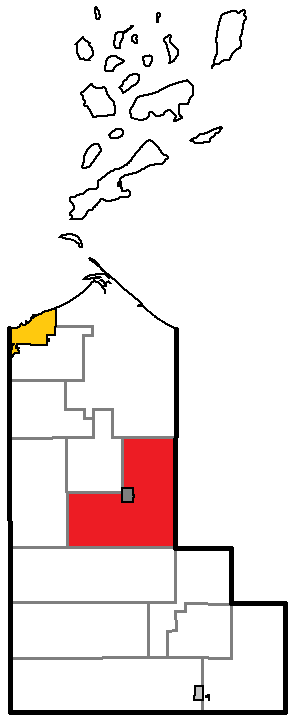
- Location of Morse, within Ashland County, Wisconsin
- Coordinates: 46°16′38″N 90°40′25″W
- Country: United States
- State: Wisconsin
- County: Ashland

Area
  - Total: 104.4 sq mi (270.3 km^{2})
  - Land: 102.8 sq mi (266.2 km^{2})
  - Water: 1.6 sq mi (4.1 km^{2})
- Elevation: 1,391 ft (424 m)

Population (2020)
  - Total: 499
  - Density: 4.86/sq mi (1.87/km^{2})
- Time zone: UTC-6 (Central (CST))
  - Summer (DST): UTC-5 (CDT)
- Area codes: 715 & 534
- FIPS code: 55-54400
- GNIS feature ID: 1583754

Morse is a town in Ashland County in the U.S. state of Wisconsin. The population was 499 at the 2020 census. The unincorporated communities of Ballou, Cayuga, Foster Junction, and Penokee are located in the town.

== Geography ==
According to the United States Census Bureau, the town has a total area of 104.4 square miles (270.3 km^{2}), of which 102.8 square miles (266.2 km^{2}) is land and 1.6 square miles (4.1 km^{2}), or 1.51%, is water.

== Demographics ==
Historical population
Census	Pop.	Note	%±
1900	1,023		—
1910	193		−81.1%
1920	639		231.1%
1930	557		−12.8%
1940	585		5.0%
1950	511		−12.6%
1960	436		−14.7%
1970	401		−8.0%
1980	469		17.0%
1990	481		2.6%
2000	515		7.1%
2010	493		−4.3%
2020	499		1.2%
U.S. Decennial Census

As of the census of 2000, there were 515 people, 194 households, and 153 families residing in the town. The population density was 5.0 people per square mile (1.9/km^{2}). There were 380 housing units at an average density of 3.7 per square mile (1.4/km^{2}). The racial makeup of the town was 97.09% White, 0.78% Native American, 0.39% Asian, 0.19% from other races, and 1.55% from two or more races. Hispanic or Latino of any race were 0.19% of the population.

There were 194 households, out of which 34.5% had children under the age of 18 living with them, 71.6% were married couples living together, 6.2% had a female householder with no husband present, and 21.1% were non-families. 16.0% of all households were made up of individuals, and 6.7% had someone living alone who was 65 years of age or older. The average household size was 2.65 and the average family size was 2.99.

In the town, the population was spread out, with 24.5% under the age of 18, 5.0% from 18 to 24, 31.7% from 25 to 44, 25.8% from 45 to 64, and 13.0% who were 65 years of age or older. The median age was 39 years. For every 100 females, there were 98.8 males. For every 100 females age 18 and over, there were 100.5 males.

The median income for a household in the town was $39,000, and the median income for a family was $40,521. Males had a median income of $27,679 versus $19,000 for females. The per capita income for the town was $19,920. About 2.5% of families and 2.6% of the population were below the poverty line, including 1.7% of those under age 18 and none of those age 65 or over.
