= Burnie Bridge =

21st century American judge

Judge of the Wisconsin Court of Appeals for the 4th district
- In office January 31, 2007 – January 2010
- Appointed by: Jim Doyle
- Preceded by: David G. Deininger
- Succeeded by: Gary Sherman

Chair of the Wisconsin Public Service Commission
- In office January 6, 2003 – April 2005
- Appointed by: Jim Doyle
- Preceded by: Ave Bie
- Succeeded by: Dan Ebert

Personal details
- Born: September 16, 1948 (age 77) Grand Rapids, Minnesota, U.S.
- Education: Miami University (B.A.); University of Wisconsin Law School (J.D.)
- Profession: Lawyer, jurist

Burneatta L. "Burnie" Bridge (born September 16, 1948) is a retired American lawyer and jurist from Wisconsin. She was a judge of the Wisconsin Court of Appeals in the Madison-based 4th appellate district. She was appointed by Governor Jim Doyle in 2007, and had previously served as his chief deputy when he was Attorney General of Wisconsin. She retired from the court in January 2010. Earlier in Doyle's gubernatorial administration, she served as chair of the Wisconsin Public Service Commission and was administrator of the Division of Children and Family Services in the Wisconsin Department of Health and Family Services.

== Early life and education ==
Burnie Bridge was born in Grand Rapids, Minnesota, in 1948. She attended Miami University in Ohio and graduated with a bachelor's degree in English literature in 1970. After obtaining her degree, she moved to Mississippi to work for the ACLU, but eventually moved to Madison, Wisconsin, where she entered the University of Wisconsin Law School. She earned her J.D. in 1982.

== Career ==
Bridge began practicing law as a private attorney in 1983, but by 1985 had moved into public service as an assistant attorney general in the Wisconsin Department of Justice, a position she held through 1993. For the decade following, she served as Deputy Attorney General. In 2003, Wisconsin Attorney General Jim Doyle was elected Governor of Wisconsin, and he subsequently appointed Bridge to several roles in his administration. From 2003 to 2005 she served as chair of the Wisconsin Public Service Commission, then in 2005 and 2006 she served as administrator for the Division of Children and Family Services for the Wisconsin Department of Health and Family Services.

In 2007, incumbent Wisconsin Court of Appeals judge David G. Deininger announced he would retire before the end of his term. Governor Doyle solicited applicants for the job. Bridge was one of six finalists interviewed; she officially received the appointment on January 22, 2007. Deininger left office on January 31. Bridge was elected to a full six-year term without opposition in 2008, but announced just 18 months later that she would retire. She left office in January 2010. Incumbent state representative Gary Sherman was appointed to succeed her.

Bridge is a member of a number of professional boards. She has been a guest instructor at the University of Wisconsin Law School and a Mentor in the University of Wisconsin Law School Legal Education Opportunities Program.

Government offices
Preceded by Ave Bie	Chair of the Wisconsin Public Service Commission; January 6, 2003 – April 2005	Succeeded by Dan Ebert
Legal offices
Preceded by David G. Deininger	Judge of the Wisconsin Court of Appeals for the 4th district January 31, 2007 – January 2010	Succeeded by Gary Sherman
