= 2020 Wisconsin elections =

- April 7, 2020; November 3, 2020

The 2020 Wisconsin Fall general election was held in the U.S. state of Wisconsin on November 3, 2020. All of Wisconsin's eight seats in the United States House of Representatives were up for election, as well as sixteen seats in the Wisconsin State Senate and all 99 seats in the Wisconsin State Assembly. Voters also chose ten electors to represent them in the Electoral College, which then participated in selecting the president of the United States. The 2020 Fall partisan primary was held on August 11, 2020.

In the Fall general election, the Democratic presidential candidate, former Vice President Joe Biden, won Wisconsin's ten electoral votes, defeating incumbent president Donald Trump. There was no change to the partisan makeup of Wisconsin's congressional delegation. Republicans gained two seats in the Wisconsin Senate; Democrats gained two seats in the Wisconsin Assembly.

The 2020 Wisconsin Spring election was held on April 7, 2020. This election featured a contested race for Wisconsin Supreme Court and the presidential preference primary for both major political parties, as well as various nonpartisan local and judicial offices. The date of this election and deadline to submit absentee ballots became a matter of controversy amid the ongoing COVID-19 pandemic in Wisconsin. The 2020 Wisconsin Spring primary was held on February 18, 2020.

Wisconsin Democrats celebrated the results of the April election with the victory of their preferred candidate in the Wisconsin Supreme Court election, reducing the conservative majority on the court to 4–3. The Democrats' preferred candidate also won re-election on the Wisconsin Court of Appeals.

In the Wisconsin Democratic presidential preference primary, Vice President Joe Biden won an overwhelming victory. This was the last primary of the 2020 Democratic nominating contest before Senator Bernie Sanders suspended his 2020 campaign. In the Wisconsin Republican presidential preference primary, incumbent president Donald Trump was unopposed. Wisconsin voters also approved an amendment to the Constitution of Wisconsin known popularly as Marsy's Law, intended to grant new rights to victims of crimes.

A special election was held on May 12, 2020, to fill the vacancy in Wisconsin's 7th congressional district. The Republican candidate won the special election, causing no change to the congressional delegation's partisan makeup. The primary for this election was held concurrently with the spring primary on February 18.

== Election information ==
=== April election ===
==== Effects of the 2020 COVID-19 pandemic ====
In Wisconsin, a swing state with a Democratic governor and a Republican legislature, an April 7 election for a state Supreme Court seat, the federal presidential primaries for both the Democratic and Republican parties, and several other judicial and local elections went ahead as scheduled.

Due to the pandemic, at least fifteen other U.S. states cancelled or postponed scheduled elections or primaries at the time of Wisconsin's election. With Wisconsin grappling with their own pandemic, state Democratic lawmakers made several attempts to postpone their election, but were prevented by other Republican legislators. Governor Tony Evers called the Wisconsin legislature into an April 4 special session, but the Republican-controlled Assembly and Senate graveled their sessions in and out within seventeen seconds. In a joint statement afterwards, Wisconsin's state Assembly Speaker Robin Vos and Senate Majority Leader Scott Fitzgerald criticized Evers for attempting to postpone the election, for not calling a special session earlier, and for reversing his previous position on keeping the election date intact.

Early in April, Evers publicly stated that he did not believe that he could postpone the election on his own. Nevertheless, after the legislature's inaction, the governor attempted to move the election by an executive order issued on April 6. Evers' effort was, however, blocked by the Wisconsin Supreme Court. On the same day, a separate effort to extend the deadline for mailing absentee ballots was blocked by the Supreme Court of the United States. The only major concession achieved was that absentee ballots postmarked by April 7 at 8 p.m. would be accepted until April 13. However, local media outlets reported that many voters had not received their requested absentee ballots by election day or, due to social distancing, were unable to satisfy a legal requirement that they obtain a witness's signature. Three tubs of ballots from Oshkosh and Appleton were found undelivered the next day, requiring voters who had requested a ballot to come in contact with others at a polling station or forfeit their vote.

The decision by Republican lawmakers to not alter the election in the face of the pandemic, such as to a mail-only vote, was sharply criticized by the editorial board of the local Milwaukee Journal-Sentinel, which had previously endorsed the Republican former governor Scott Walker. They called the election "the most undemocratic in the state's history," adding that it put "at risk everything we've gained from the past three weeks of staying home and keeping our distance." In a sub-headline, The New York Times stated that the election was "almost certain to be tarred as illegitimate." The newspaper contextualized the inability of Wisconsin's lawmakers to come to an agreement on altering the election as another chapter in the contentious recent political history of the state, which included "a decade of bitter partisan wrangling that saw [state Republicans] clinically attack and defang the state's Democratic institutions, starting with organized labor and continuing with voting laws making it far harder for poor and black residents of urban areas to vote." Republicans believed that holding the election on April 7, when Democratic-leaning urban areas were hard-hit by the pandemic, would help secure them political advantages like a continued 5–2 conservative majority on the Wisconsin Supreme Court (through the elected seat of Daniel Kelly).

When the election went ahead on April 7, access to easy in-person voting heavily depended on where voters were located. In smaller or more rural communities, which tended to be whiter and vote Republican, few issues were reported. In more urbanized areas, the COVID-19 pandemic forced the closure and consolidation of many polling places around the state despite the use of 2,400 National Guard members to combat a severe shortage in poll workers. The effects were felt most heavily in Milwaukee, Wisconsin's most populous city with the largest minority population and the center of the state's ongoing pandemic. The city's government was only able to open 5 of 180 polling stations after being short by nearly 1,000 poll workers. As a result, lengthy lines were reported, with some voters waiting for up to 2.5 hours and through rain showers. The lines disproportionately affected Milwaukee's large Hispanic and African-American population; the latter had already been disproportionately afflicted with the COVID-19 pandemic, forming nearly half of Wisconsin's documented cases and over half its deaths at the time the vote was conducted. However, by the time the election concluded, Milwaukee Election Commissioner Neil Albrecht stated that despite some of the problems, the in-person voting ran smoothly.

Similar problems with poll station closures and long lines were reported in Waukesha, where only one polling station was opened for a city of 70,000, and Green Bay, where only 17 poll workers out of 270 were able to work. Other cities were able to keep lines much shorter, including the state capital of Madison, which opened about two-thirds of its usual polling locations, and Appleton, which opened all of its usual 15.

Voters across the state were advised to maintain social distancing, wear face masks, and bring their own pens. Vos, the state Assembly Speaker, served as an election inspector for in-person voting on April 7. While wearing medical-like personal protective equipment of gloves, a mask, and full gown, he told reporters that it was "incredibly safe to go out" and vote, adding that voters faced "minimal exposure."

==== Turnout ====
1,551,711 valid ballots were cast.

This voter turnout is approximately 45.8% of eligible voters.

Turnout was also 34.3% of the voting age population, which is a decrease compared to the 47.4% voting age population turnout of the April 2016 elections.

==== Mail and absentee ballots ====
===== April 2020 election =====
As of April 21, 2020, Wisconsin reports that 1,239,611 absentee ballots were requested by voters, 1,282,097 absentee ballots were sent to voters, and 1,138,491 absentee ballots were returned by voters for the April 7 elections. It has not been reported how many absentee ballots were valid.

Approximately 71% of votes cast in the April election were absentee ballots, an unprecedented proportion of absentee votes in Wisconsin.

After reports of missing and undelivered absentee ballots, Wisconsin's Senators Tammy Baldwin and Ron Johnson, as well as the Milwaukee Election Commission, called for investigations.

Absentee ballots by county, April 2020 [unofficial]
County	Requested	Sent	Returned
Adams	3282	3416	3157
Ashland	2494	2467	2141
Barron	6204	6506	5889
Bayfield	3613	3660	3468
Brown	53159	52220	45990
Buffalo	2086	2210	1971
Burnett	1985	2074	1827
Calumet	10367	11094	9643
Chippewa	12097	11844	11072
Clark	3371	3239	1968
Columbia	12333	12687	12046
Crawford	2568	2541	2358
Dane	174644	177774	156962
Dodge	15424	16683	15561
Door	9344	9294	6716
Douglas	7150	7085	6281
Dunn	6976	6946	5463
Eau Claire	22823	22723	19070
Florence	852	700	674
Fond du Lac	18873	19572	18233
Forest	1527	1503	1298
Grant	7620	7977	7132
Green	8013	7967	7413
Green Lake	3320	3302	3116
Iowa	4815	5472	5167
Iron	1444	1865	1748
Jackson	2562	2554	1900
Jefferson	17341	18196	16009
Juneau	3212	3141	2375
Kenosha	29198	29504	25889
Kewaunee	4023	3971	3622
La Crosse	23546	24678	21706
Lafayette	2671	2777	2633
Langlade	2816	2804	2597
Lincoln	4563	4544	3470
Manitowoc	14744	15186	14229
Marathon	23250	25070	22451
Marinette	6717	7658	7096
Marquette	2446	2377	2179
Menominee	112	74	57
Milwaukee	192572	200417	169122
Monroe	5810	5711	4813
Oconto	6519	6406	5985
Oneida	7641	8198	7278
Outagamie	40211	39975	35345
Ozaukee	29273	29163	26103
Pepin	990	928	434
Pierce	5311	6173	5680
Polk	4903	5346	4893
Portage	12508	14551	13312
Price	2672	2682	2577
Racine	44228	43895	38799
Richland	2906	2877	2667
Rock	28017	29371	26575
Rusk	1870	1832	1197
Sauk	12227	14438	12684
Sawyer	14893	14959	13724
Shawano	2248	2970	2747
Sheboygan	6394	6352	6006
St Croix	25564	25511	23686
Taylor	2778	2759	2523
Trempealeau	3802	3768	3501
Vernon	5007	5040	4113
Vilas	5410	5345	4972
Walworth	20109	21900	19899
Washburn	2828	2756	2520
Washington	35601	39354	37655
Waukesha	122564	128641	119185
Waupaca	9482	9326	8696
Waushara	3779	3772	3412
Winnebago	36436	38204	32618
Wood	11473	14122	13193
Total	1239611	1282097	1138491

===== November 2020 election =====
To vote by mail in the November election, registered Wisconsin voters had to request a ballot by October 29, 2020. As of early October, some 1,315,431 voters had requested mail ballots.

== Federal offices ==
=== President ===
Incumbent president Donald Trump sought a second four-year term. In Wisconsin, voters chose electors for Democratic former Vice President Joe Biden.

==== Democratic primary ====
For its part in the 2020 Democratic Party presidential primaries, Wisconsin's presidential preference primary was on the ballot for Wisconsin's spring general election, held on Tuesday, April 7, 2020. At the time of the Wisconsin primary, only Joe Biden and Bernie Sanders remained in the field of Democratic candidates. However, due to delays in vote-counting, Bernie Sanders had already withdrawn from the race by the time the vote totals were released. Joe Biden won a decisive victory in the state, capturing about 63% of the vote and winning every county.

The Wisconsin primary is an open primary, with the state awarding 97 delegates, of which 84 are pledged delegates allocated on the basis of the results of the primary election.

==== Republican primary ====
In the 2020 Republican Party presidential primaries, the Wisconsin Republican presidential preference primary was also on the April 7 ballot. The only candidate for the Republican nomination was incumbent president Donald Trump, who received about 98% of the vote.

==== General election ====
===== Polling =====
Donald Trump vs. Joe Biden
Source of poll aggregation	Dates administered	Dates updated	Joe Biden	Donald Trump	Other/ undecided (Note: Calculated by taking the difference of 100% and all other candidates combined)	Margin
270 to Win	September 7, 2020 - September 18, 2020	September 18, 2020	50.0%	43.5%		Biden + 6.5
Real Clear Politics	August 29, 2020 – September 13, 2020	September 18, 2020	50.1%	43.4%		Biden + 6.7
The Economist		September 18, 2020	53.0%	47.0%		Biden + 6.0
FiveThirtyEight		September 18, 2020	50.3%	43.6%		Biden + 6.8

===== Results =====
Joe Biden won the presidential election against Donald Trump and was awarded Wisconsin's ten electoral votes.

Presidential election results: Biden 40–50% 50–60% 60–70% 70–80% 80–90% / Trump 40–50% 50–60% 60–70% 70–80%

United States presidential election in Wisconsin, 2020
Party	Candidate	Votes	%	±%
Democratic	Joe Biden / Kamala Harris	1,630,866	49.45%	+3.00%
Republican	Donald Trump (incumbent) / Mike Pence (incumbent)	1,610,184	48.82%	+1.60%
Independent	Jo Jorgensen / Spike Cohen	38,491	1.17%	N/A
Independent	Brian Carroll / Amar Patel	5,259	0.16%	N/A
Constitution	Don Blankenship / William Mohr	5,146	0.16%	−0.25%
Independent	Howie Hawkins (write-in) / Angela Walker (write-in)	1,089	0.03%	N/A
Independent	Kanye West (write-in) / Michelle Tidball (write-in)	411	0.01%	N/A
Independent	Gloria La Riva (write-in) / Sunil Freeman (write-in)	110	0.00%	N/A
Independent	Mark Charles (write-in) / Adrian Wallace (write-in)	52	0.00%	N/A
Independent	Jade Simmons (write-in) / Claudeliah Roze (write-in)	36	0.00%	N/A
Independent	Kasey Wells (write-in) / No running mate	25	0.00%	N/A
Independent	President R19 Boddie (write-in) / No running mate	5	0.00%	N/A
Write-in		6,367	0.19%	-0.57%
Plurality		20,682	0.63%	-0.14%
Total votes		3,298,041	100.0%	+10.82%
Democratic gain from Republican		Swing	1.39%	

===== Post-election issues =====
Wisconsin was one of several states where the Trump campaign sought recounts, then filed lawsuits attempting to overturn the electoral slate, then attempted to enlist allies in the State Legislature to choose an alternate slate of electors, and finally enlisted allies in Congress to attempt to throw out the state's electoral votes during the January 6, 2021, electoral vote count. These efforts, which culminated in the January 6 riot at the United States Capitol, ultimately failed to overthrow the election results.

=== House of Representatives ===
The 2020 United States House of Representatives elections in Wisconsin were held on November 3, 2020, to elect Wisconsin's delegation to the United States House of Representatives for the 117th United States Congress. A primary election for these offices was held on August 11, 2020. At the time of the 2020 election, Wisconsin had eight congressional districts, and in six districts the incumbent from the previous general election ran for and won re-election.

- In Wisconsin's 5th congressional district, Republican Jim Sensenbrenner announced he would not seek re-election in 2020 and retired after 42 years in Congress. His seat was won by Republican state senator Scott L. Fitzgerald.
- In Wisconsin's 7th congressional district, Republican Sean Duffy resigned his seat early due to family concerns. A special election to fill the remainder of his term in the 116th Congress was held on May 12, 2020, and was won by Republican state senator Tom Tiffany.

==== 7th district special election ====
In the special election held on May 12, 2020, Republican state senator Tom Tiffany defeated Democrat Tricia Zunker. A special primary election for the vacant congressional seat was held concurrently with the Spring Primary, February 18, 2020.

- The winner of the Democratic primary was Tricia Zunker, president of the Wausau School Board and Associate Justice of the Ho-Chunk Nation Supreme Court.
- The winner of the Republican primary was Tom Tiffany, state senator for Wisconsin's 12th senatorial district.

Wisconsin's 7th congressional district special election, 2020
Party	Candidate	Votes	%	±%
Special election, May 12, 2020
Republican	Tom Tiffany	109,592	57.22%	−2.89%
Democratic	Tricia Zunker	81,928	42.78%	+4.27%
Plurality		27,664	14.44%	-7.16%
Total votes		191,520	100.0%	-40.68%
Republican hold				

==== General election ====
District	CPVI	Incumbent			Candidates (check mark indicates primary winners)		Result
District	CPVI	Representative	First elected	Incumbent status	Candidate	Ballot status	Result
Wisconsin 1	R+5	Bryan Steil	2018	Running	✓ Bryan Steil	Approved	Incumbent re-elected
Wisconsin 1	R+5	Bryan Steil	2018	Running	John Baker	Approved	Incumbent re-elected
Wisconsin 1	R+5	Bryan Steil	2018	Running	Jeremy J. Ryan	Denied	Incumbent re-elected
Wisconsin 1	R+5	Bryan Steil	2018	Running	Charles E. Barman	Denied	Incumbent re-elected
Wisconsin 1	R+5	Bryan Steil	2018	Running	✓ Roger Polack	Approved	Incumbent re-elected
Wisconsin 1	R+5	Bryan Steil	2018	Running	Josh Pade	Approved	Incumbent re-elected
Wisconsin 2	D+18	Mark Pocan	2012	Running	✓ Mark Pocan	Approved	Incumbent re-elected
Wisconsin 2	D+18	Mark Pocan	2012	Running	✓ Peter Theron	Approved	Incumbent re-elected
Wisconsin 2	D+18	Mark Pocan	2012	Running	Bradley J. Burt	Denied	Incumbent re-elected
Wisconsin 3	EVEN	Ron Kind	1996	Running	✓ Ron Kind	Approved	Incumbent re-elected
Wisconsin 3	EVEN	Ron Kind	1996	Running	Mark Neumann	Approved	Incumbent re-elected
Wisconsin 3	EVEN	Ron Kind	1996	Running	✓ Derrick Van Orden	Approved	Incumbent re-elected
Wisconsin 3	EVEN	Ron Kind	1996	Running	Jessi Ebben	Approved	Incumbent re-elected
Wisconsin 3	EVEN	Ron Kind	1996	Running	Brandon Cook	Denied	Incumbent re-elected
Wisconsin 3	EVEN	Ron Kind	1996	Running	Jonathan Sundblom	Denied	Incumbent re-elected
Wisconsin 3	EVEN	Ron Kind	1996	Running	Kevin John Ruscher	Denied	Incumbent re-elected
Wisconsin 4	D+25	Gwen Moore	2004	Running	✓ Gwen Moore	Approved	Incumbent re-elected
Wisconsin 4	D+25	Gwen Moore	2004	Running	David Turner	Denied	Incumbent re-elected
Wisconsin 4	D+25	Gwen Moore	2004	Running	✓ Tim Rogers (Note: Apparent winner)	Approved	Incumbent re-elected
Wisconsin 4	D+25	Gwen Moore	2004	Running	Cindy Werner	Approved	Incumbent re-elected
Wisconsin 4	D+25	Gwen Moore	2004	Running	Travis R. Clark	Denied	Incumbent re-elected
Wisconsin 4	D+25	Gwen Moore	2004	Running	Robert R. Raymond	Approved	Incumbent re-elected
Wisconsin 4	D+25	Gwen Moore	2004	Running	Aneb Jah Rasta Sensas-Utcha Nefer-1	Denied	Incumbent re-elected
Wisconsin 5	R+13	Jim Sensenbrenner	1978	Not Running	✓ Scott L. Fitzgerald	Approved	Incumbent retired. New member elected. Republican hold.
Wisconsin 5	R+13	Jim Sensenbrenner	1978	Not Running	Cliff DeTemple	Approved	Incumbent retired. New member elected. Republican hold.
Wisconsin 5	R+13	Jim Sensenbrenner	1978	Not Running	✓ Tom Palzewicz	Approved	Incumbent retired. New member elected. Republican hold.
Wisconsin 6	R+8	Glenn Grothman	2014	Running	✓ Glenn Grothman	Approved	Incumbent re-elected
Wisconsin 6	R+8	Glenn Grothman	2014	Running	✓ Jessica King	Approved	Incumbent re-elected
Wisconsin 6	R+8	Glenn Grothman	2014	Running	Matthew L. Boor	Approved	Incumbent re-elected
Wisconsin 6	R+8	Glenn Grothman	2014	Running	Michael G. Beardsley	Approved	Incumbent re-elected
Wisconsin 7	R+8	Tom Tiffany	2020 (special)	Running	✓ Tom Tiffany	Approved	Incumbent re-elected
Wisconsin 7	R+8	Tom Tiffany	2020 (special)	Running	✓ Tricia Zunker	Approved	Incumbent re-elected
Wisconsin 7	R+8	Tom Tiffany	2020 (special)	Running	Ken Driessen	Denied	Incumbent re-elected
Wisconsin 8	R+7	Mike Gallagher	2016	Running	✓ Mike Gallagher	Approved	Incumbent re-elected
Wisconsin 8	R+7	Mike Gallagher	2016	Running	✓ Amanda Stuck	Approved	Incumbent re-elected
Wisconsin 8	R+7	Mike Gallagher	2016	Running	Robbie Hoffman	Denied	Incumbent re-elected

== State offices ==
=== Legislative ===
==== State senate ====
The 16 even-numbered districts out of 33 in the Wisconsin Senate were up for election in 2020. Democrats and Republicans both had seven occupied seats and one vacant seat up in this election, for a total of eight seats each. Seven incumbent senators have filed official papers of non-candidacy (including two vacancies). Five candidates were running unopposed.

Prior to the election, Republicans controlled the chamber with a 18 to 13 majority.

Seats	Party (majority caucus shading)		Vacant	Total
Seats	Democratic	Republican		Total
Total after last election (2018)	14	19	-	33
Total before this election	13	18	2	33
Up for election	7	7	2	16
This election	6	10	-	16
Total after this election	12	21	-	33
Change in total	▼2	▲2	Steady	Steady

==== State Assembly ====
All of the 99 seats in the Wisconsin State Assembly were up for election in 2020. Right before this election, 63 Assembly seats were held by Republicans, 34 seats were held by Democrats, and two seats were vacant.

Seats	Party (majority caucus shading)		Vacant	Total
Seats	Democratic	Republican		Total
Total after last election (2018)	36	63	-	99
Total before this election	34	63	2	99
Up for election	34	63	2	99
This election	38	61	-	99
Total after this election	38	61	-	99
Change in total	▲2	▼2	Steady	Steady

=== Judicial ===
Three judicial appointees of former governor Scott Walker were defeated in the 2020 spring election—Wisconsin Supreme Court Justice Daniel Kelly, and Milwaukee Circuit Court judges Paul Dedinsky and Daniel Gabler.

==== State Supreme Court ====
2020 Wisconsin Supreme Court election
Primary election
Party	Candidate	Votes	%
Nonpartisan	Daniel Kelly (incumbent)	352,876	50.04%
Nonpartisan	Jill Karofsky	261,783	37.13%
Nonpartisan	Edward A. Fallone	89,184	12.65%
Write-in		1,295	0.18%
Total votes		705,138	100.0%
General election
Nonpartisan	Jill Karofsky	855,573	55.21%
Nonpartisan	Daniel Kelly (incumbent)	693,134	44.73%
Write-in		990	0.06%
Total votes		1,549,697	100.0%

==== State Court of Appeals ====
Results by county: Neubauer: Neubauer—50–60%; Neubauer—60–70%; Bugenhagen Jr.: Bugenhagen Jr.—50–60%

Three seats on the Wisconsin Court of Appeals were up for election in 2020.

- Judge Joe Donald was unopposed seeking re-election in District I.
- Judge Rachel A. Graham was unopposed seeking re-election in District IV.
- In District II, incumbent Judge Lisa Neubauer defeated challenger Waukesha County Circuit Judge Paul Bugenhagen Jr.

Wisconsin Court of Appeals District II election, 2020
Party	Candidate	Votes	%
General election, April 7, 2020
Nonpartisan	Lisa S. Neubauer (incumbent)	231,788	53.99%
Nonpartisan	Paul Bugenhagen, Jr.	196,958	45.88%
	Scattering	540	0.13%
Plurality		34,830	8.11%
Total votes		429,286	100.0%

==== State circuit courts ====
34 of the state's 249 circuit court seats were up for election in 2020. Eight of those seats were contested. Two incumbent judges were defeated—Milwaukee County judges Paul Dedinsky and Daniel Gabler.

- In Brown County, incumbent Judge Beau G. Liegeois, appointed by Governor Tony Evers in 2019, defeated challenger Andy Williams, a former county supervisor.
- In Chippewa County, incumbent Judge Steven R. Cray was not seeking re-election. Attorney Benjamin Lane defeated Chippewa Falls school board member Sharon Gibbs McIlquham.
- In Dodge County, incumbent Judge Steven G. Bauer was not seeking re-election. Attorney Kristine Snow defeated assistant district attorney James Sempf.
- In Florence and Forest Counties, incumbent two-term Judge Leon D. Stenz narrowly defeated former Judge Robert A. Kennedy Jr., whom he had previously defeated in 2008.
- In Marinette County, incumbent Judge David G. Miron was not seeking re-election. Court commissioner Jane Kopish Sequin defeated attorney Mike Perry.
- In Milwaukee County Branch 5, incumbent Judge Paul Dedinsky, appointed by Governor Scott Walker, was defeated by Brett Blomme, chairman of Milwaukee's zoning adjustment board, CEO of Cream City Foundation, and a former public defender.
- In Milwaukee County Branch 29, incumbent Daniel Gabler, appointed by Governor Scott Walker, was defeated by Rebecca Kiefer, an assistant district attorney.
- In Waukesha County, incumbent Judge Lee S. Dreyfus Jr., was not seeking re-election. Jack Melvin defeated Sarah A. Ponath; both are attorneys.

Circuit	Branch	Incumbent	Elected			Defeated			Defeated in primary
Circuit	Branch	Incumbent	Name	Votes	%	Name	Votes	%	Name(s)
Barron	2	J. Michael Bitney	J. Michael Bitney	8,981	99.77%				
Barron	3	Maureen D. Boyle	Maureen D. Boyle	8,962	99.79%				
Brown	8	Beau G. Liegeois	Beau G. Liegeois	29,035	55.62%	Andy Williams	23,079	44.21%	
Chippewa	3	Steven R. Cray	Benjamin Lane	8,839	56.57%	Sharon Gibbs McIlquham	6,774	43.35%	
Dane	7	William E. Hanrahan	William E. Hanrahan	127,673	98.86%				
Dodge	1	Brian A. Pfitzinger	Brian A. Pfitzinger	16,773	100.00%				
Dodge	4	Steven Bauer	Kristine A. Snow	10,351	50.82%	James T. Sempf	10,017	49.18%	
Dunn	1	James M. Peterson	James M. Peterson	8,283	100.00%				
Eau Claire	2	Michael Schumacher	Michael Schumacher	20,246	99.19%				
Florence–Forest		Leon D. Stenz	Leon D. Stenz	2,189	55.25%	Robert A. Kennedy Jr.	1,770	44.67%	
Fond du Lac	1	Dale L. English	Dale L. English	20,170	99.96%				
Iron		Anthony J. Stella Jr.	Anthony J. Stella Jr.	1,927	99.02%				
Juneau	2	Paul S. Curran	Paul S. Curran	5,282	98.84%				
Kenosha	3	Bruce E. Schroeder	Bruce E. Schroeder	26,063	98.70%				
Marathon	3	Lamont K. Jacobson	LaMont K. Jacobson	26,455	99.31%				
Marinette	1	David G. Miron	Jane Kopish Sequin	5,397	51.30%	Mike Perry	5,123	48.70%	
Menominee–Shawano	1	James R. Habeck	Tony A. Kordus	7,420	96.05%				
Milwaukee	2	Milton L. Childs Sr.	Milton L. Childs Sr.	127,585	99.10%				
Milwaukee	5	Paul Dedinsky	Brett Blomme	99,091	58.28%	Paul Dedinsky	70,005	41.17%	Zach Whitney
Milwaukee	7	Thomas J. McAdams	Thomas J. McAdams	123,474	98.88%				
Milwaukee	16	Brittany Grayson	Brittany Grayson	126,151	99.20%				
Milwaukee	24	Janet Protasiewicz	Janet Protasiewicz	125,239	99.11%				
Milwaukee	27	Kevin E. Martens	Kevin E. Martens	123,248	99.05%				
Milwaukee	29	Dan Gabler	Rebecca Kiefer	122,798	70.60%	Dan Gabler	50,602	29.09%	
Milwaukee	32	Laura Gramling Perez	Laura Gramling Perez	126,227	99.15%				
Oneida	1	Patrick F. O'Melia	Patrick F. O'Melia	9,210	99.47%				
Outagamie	2	Nancy J. Krueger	Emily I. Lonergan	35,172	100.00%				
Outagamie	3	Mitchell J. Metropulos	Mitchell J. Metropulos	35,126	100.00%				
St. Croix	1	Scott J. Nordstrand	Scott J. Nordstrand	15,250	98.85%				
Washburn		Eugene D. Harrington	Angeline E. Winton	4,034	99.60%				
Washington	2	James K. Muehlbauer	James K. Muehlbauer	31,757	100.00%				
Waukesha	5	Lee S. Dreyfus Jr.	Jack Melvin	67,792	55.97%	Sarah A. Ponath	53,059	43.81%	
Waupaca	2	Vicki L. Clussman	Vicki L. Clussman	10,664	99.63%				
Wood	1	Gregory J. Potter	Gregory J. Potter	16,270	99.47%				

=== Constitutional amendment ===
Marsy's Law Amendment
- April 7, 2020
- Additional rights of crime victims. Shall section 9m of article I of the constitution, which gives certain rights to crime victims, be amended to give crime victims additional rights, to require that the rights of crime victims be protected with equal force to the protections afforded the accused while leaving the federal constitutional rights of the accused intact, and to allow crime victims to enforce their rights in court?

Results
Choice	Votes	%
Yes	1,106,399	74.89%
No	370,941	25.11%
Total votes	370,941	100.00%
- Yes: 60–70% 70–80% 80–90%

In the April election, Wisconsin voters overwhelmingly approved an amendment to the Constitution of Wisconsin to enact the Wisconsin version of Marsy's Law. The amendment is intended to provide additional rights to victims of crimes, but the language of the Wisconsin referendum was criticized by legal experts as being vague and misleading.

== Local offices ==
=== Kenosha County ===
==== Kenosha mayor ====
A regularly scheduled mayoral election was held in Kenosha, Wisconsin, at the Spring general election, April 7, 2020. The incumbent mayor, John Antaramian, was re-elected without opposition to a sixth four-year term.

=== Marathon County ===
==== Wausau mayor ====
A regularly scheduled mayoral election was held in Wausau, Wisconsin, at the Spring general election, April 7, 2020. Marathon County supervisor Katie Rosenberg was elected to a four-year term, defeating incumbent mayor Robert Mielke.

=== Milwaukee County ===
==== Milwaukee mayor ====
A regularly scheduled mayoral election was held in Milwaukee, Wisconsin, at the Spring general election, April 7, 2020. The incumbent mayor, Tom Barrett, first elected in 2004, was re-elected to a fifth four-year term, defeating state senator Lena Taylor.

==== Milwaukee County executive ====
A regularly scheduled county executive election was held in Milwaukee County, at the Spring general election, April 7, 2020. State representative David Crowley was elected to a four-year term, narrowly defeated state senator Chris Larson. The incumbent, Chris Abele, first elected in a 2011 special election, did not run for re-election.

==== Milwaukee city attorney ====
A regularly scheduled city attorney election was held in Milwaukee, Wisconsin, at the Spring general election, April 7, 2020. Attorney Tearman Spencer won a shocking upset over 36-year incumbent Milwaukee city attorney Grant F. Langley. Spencer announced the day before the election that he had tested positive for COVID-19.

=== Outagamie County ===
==== Appleton mayor ====
A regularly scheduled mayoral election was held in Appleton, Wisconsin, at the Spring general election, April 7, 2020. Jake Woodford, a senior administrator at Appleton's Lawrence University, was elected to a four-year term, defeating former city council member James Clemons by a margin of a little over 10 percent. The incumbent, Tim Hanna, first elected in 1996, did not run for a seventh term. Hanna endorsed Woodford in the days leading up to the election, in large part because Hanna believed Woodford was better suited to manage the COVID-19 pandemic. Woodford was also noted for his youth, as he was just 29 years old at the time of his victory.

=== Racine County ===
==== Racine school referendum ====
A supplemental funding referendum was held in the Racine Unified School District at the Spring general election, April 7, 2020. By a margin of five votes, voters approved a referendum to allow the Racine Unified School District to collect an addition $1 billion in revenue over the next 30 years to fund a long-term plan for school facilities construction and maintenance. The local referendum received unusual national attention when it was endorsed by both leading candidates for the Democratic presidential nomination—Joe Biden and Bernie Sanders. After a recount, the result was confirmed by a final margin of four votes. Legal challenges to the referendum results continued for more than two years, with the Wisconsin Supreme Court unanimously ruling in April 2022 that there was no right to re-examine election results in court after a recount had already been completed by the appropriate elections officials.

Racine schools additional funding
Candidate	Votes	%
Yes	16,715	50.01%
No	16,711	49.99%
Total votes	33,426	100.0%

=== Wood County ===
==== Wisconsin Rapids mayor ====
A regularly scheduled mayoral election was held in Wisconsin Rapids, Wisconsin, at the Spring general election, April 7, 2020. City councilmember Shane Blaser was elected to a two-year term, defeating incumbent mayor Zach Vruwink.

== See also ==
- Voter suppression in the United States 2019–2020: Wisconsin
- Elections in Wisconsin
- Bilingual elections requirement for Wisconsin (per Voting Rights Act Amendments of 2006)
- Political party strength in Wisconsin

== Notes ==
Partisan clients
