= Northland College (Wisconsin) =

Private college in Ashland, Wisconsin, US

- Former name: North Wisconsin Academy (1892–1906)
- Type: Private college
- Active: July 14, 1892; 133 years ago–May 24, 2025; 12 months ago
- Affiliations: Eco League
- Endowment: $23.7 million (2013)
- President: Barb Lundberg
- Administrative staff: 141
- Undergraduates: 240 full-time
- Location: Ashland, Wisconsin, United States; 46°34′46″N 90°52′32″W
- Campus: 130 acre; Rural, A total of 220 acres (89 ha)
- Colors: (Navy, grey, and orange)
- Nickname: "LumberJacks" or "LumberJills"
- Sporting affiliations: NCAA Division III – UMAC
- Website: northland.edu/

Northland College was a private college in Ashland, Wisconsin, United States. As of its closure, it enrolled over 200 full-time undergraduates and employed 60 faculty members and 99 staff members. Northland College was accredited by the Higher Learning Commission.

In February 2025, the college announced that it would close after the 2024–25 school year.

== History ==
Northland College was the successor to the North Wisconsin Academy, which initially opened on July 14, 1892. Sponsored by the Congregational Churches, it was a co-educational high school intended to serve the isolated, northern parts of Minnesota, Wisconsin, and Michigan.

The academy expanded its program to include college coursework in 1906, thus becoming Northland College. Wheeler Hall, built in 1892, was the North Wisconsin Academy's sole building, providing classroom space, board and cafeteria services. The building was renovated in 1993 and 1994 and remains the centerpiece of campus, housing classrooms and faculty offices for the social sciences and humanities. It is listed on the National Register of Historic Places.

In 2011, the college's accreditor, the Higher Learning Commission, required Northland to file a financial recovery plan because of their concerns about the college's financial position. The college's endowment, which incurred losses in the stock market crash of 2008-09, recovered and the college reported 2010-11 fund raising at the highest level in several years.

In the spring of 2024, the college's administrators publicly declared that the college was experiencing severe financial distress. In their call for donations, they said that the college lacked the funding to remain open beyond the current academic year. In the accompanying press release, administrators said that $12 million was required to keep the institution running. On the day after the original fundraising deadline on April 3, the college declared financial exigency and delayed the deadline by two weeks. By that point, the college had raised US$1,500,000 from 900 donors. On May 1, the college officially announced that it would remain open under a restructured model to be implemented in the Fall 2024 semester.

On February 19, 2025, Northland College announced it would close at the end of the academic year.

== Location ==
The college was in Ashland, Wisconsin, a small city on the shore of Lake Superior. The school was located ten blocks from the lakefront. The school's location on the lakefront made internship opportunities available with agencies such as the U.S. Fish and Wildlife Service's Ashland Fisheries Resource Office, the Whittlesey Creek National Wildlife Refuge, the Wisconsin Department of Natural Resources, and the United States Geological Survey.

== Academics ==
Northland College was accredited by the Higher Learning Commission.

== Native American focus ==
The college had a relationship with the nearby Native American communities, being close to the Lac Courte Oreilles, Bad River and Red Cliff Ojibwe reservations. The college offered courses on Native American history, language and culture, and a degree in Native American studies. In August 2011, Northland College received a $163,383 grant from the Otto Bremer Foundation to establish a Native American and Indigenous Culture Center and a Council on Indigenous Relations.

== Environmental focus ==
Each program at Northland College incorporated an emphasis on the environment and sustainability. Many classes focused on or include environmental issues.

In 1971, shortly after the first Earth Day, Northland College hosted its first environmental conference. One keynote speaker was Sigurd Olson. The college's environmental outreach arm, the Sigurd Olson Environmental Institute, opened in 1972. The institute worked to educate the North country, students and community members about Great Lakes environmental issues.

Northland College was a sponsoring partner of the Chequamegon Bay Area Partnership, a coalition of 14 regional municipalities and tribal governments, state and federal agencies, and nonprofit organizations working toward the restoration of Lake Superior. Since September 2010, the partnership has won more than $1 million in competitive grants from the Great Lakes Restoration Initiative to fund habitat restoration, outreach, and education and environmental survey initiatives. This amount includes two grants totaling nearly $500,000 awarded in August 2011.

The college was also part of the Eco League, a five-college consortium that enables students to spend semesters at Alaska Pacific University, Green Mountain College, Prescott College, Dickinson College, and College of the Atlantic.

=== Sustainability ===
Northland College had been recognized by Sierra magazine, the Princeton Review, Forbes magazine, the National Arbor Day Foundation, and the Sustainable Endowments Institute for its commitment to sustainability and developing environmentally conscious campus initiatives. The campus has a wind turbine, five photovoltaic arrays, several rain gardens, and a geothermal heating and cooling system. Several of the campus buildings had been recognized for their environmentally friendly designs, including the McLean Environmental Living and Learning Center and the Dexter Library, which in 2010 received Leadership in Energy and Environmental Design Gold certification.

Other campus initiatives included the student-managed Renewable Energy Fund, which provided over $40,000 annually to fund campus sustainability initiatives, the Northland Bike Shoppe, which provided free-to-use bicycles for the campus community, and a robust campus-wide composting program, which diverted nearly two tons of food waste from landfills each year.

Northland was an active member of several organizations focused on sustainability in higher education, including the Association for the Advancement of Sustainability in Higher Education, the Midwest Regional Collaborative for Sustainability Education, the Campus Consortium for Environmental Excellence, and the Leadership Circle of the American Colleges and Universities Presidents' Climate Commitment, which commits participating colleges to constructing buildings that meet or exceed LEED Silver certification.

== Campus life ==
Northland's campus had 19 major buildings, and is dominated by the Ponzio Campus Center, completed in 2003, and Wheeler Hall, built in 1892 and renovated during the 1993–1994 school year. The buildings are predominantly brick with sharply peaked roofs, in an effort to emulate the region's historical brownstone architecture. The campus center is on an open mall, a grassy area where students gather to sunbathe and play.

Two buildings on campus are listed on the National Register of Historic Places, Wheeler Hall and Wakefield Hall.

Since 1991, Northland has been a smoke-free campus with the exception of pre-approved Native American ceremonies.

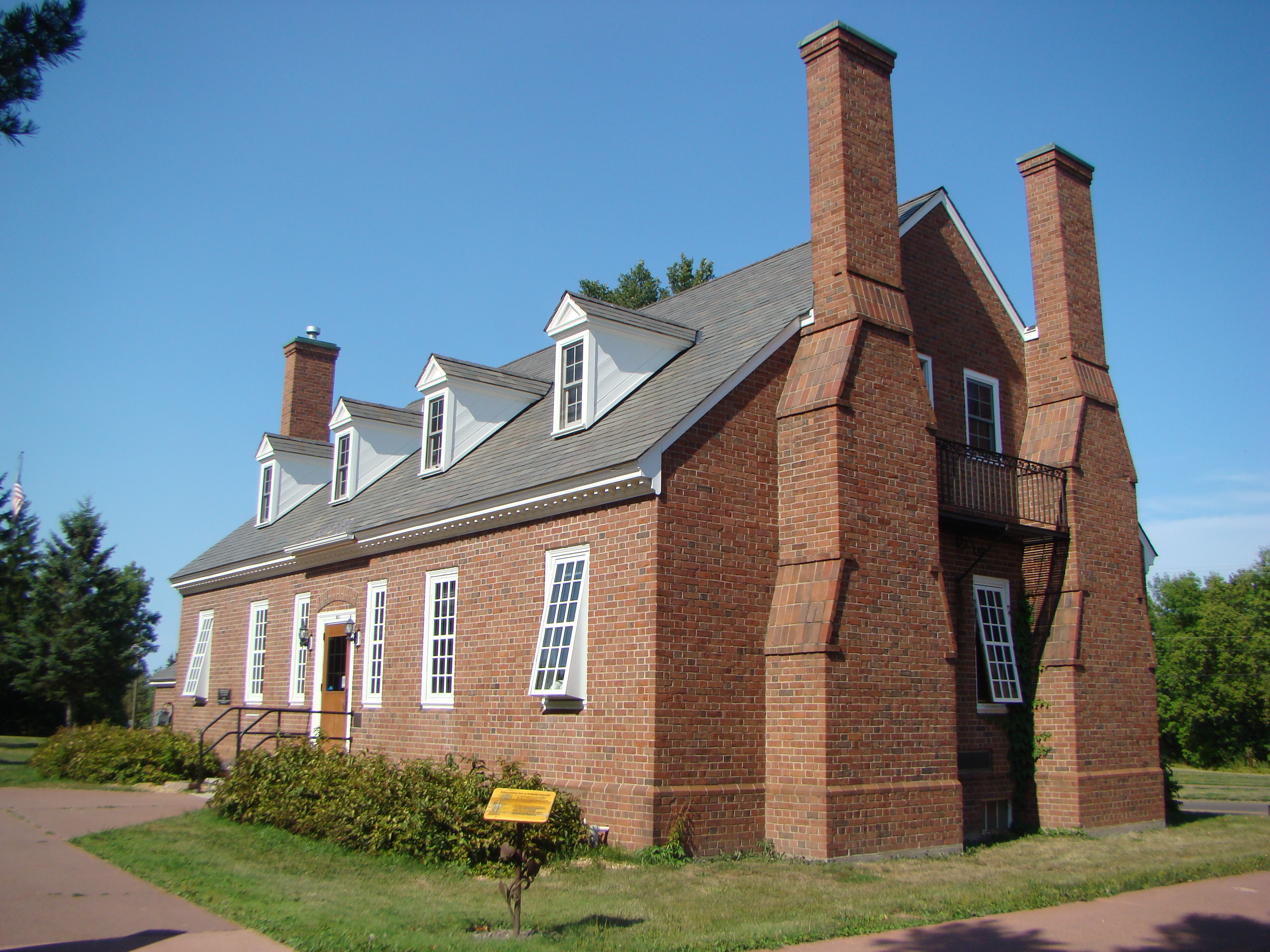
Wakefield Hall

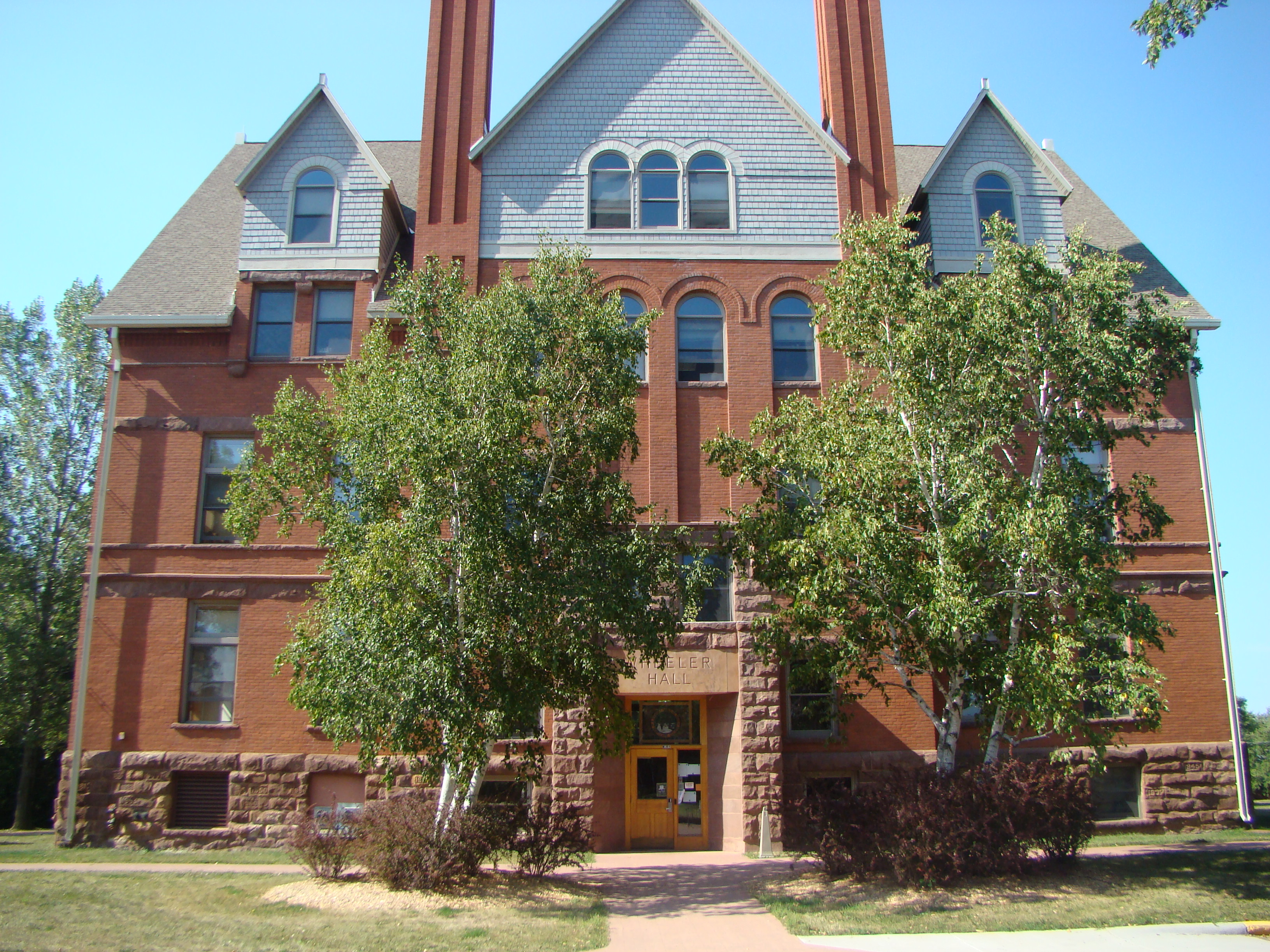
Wheeler Hall

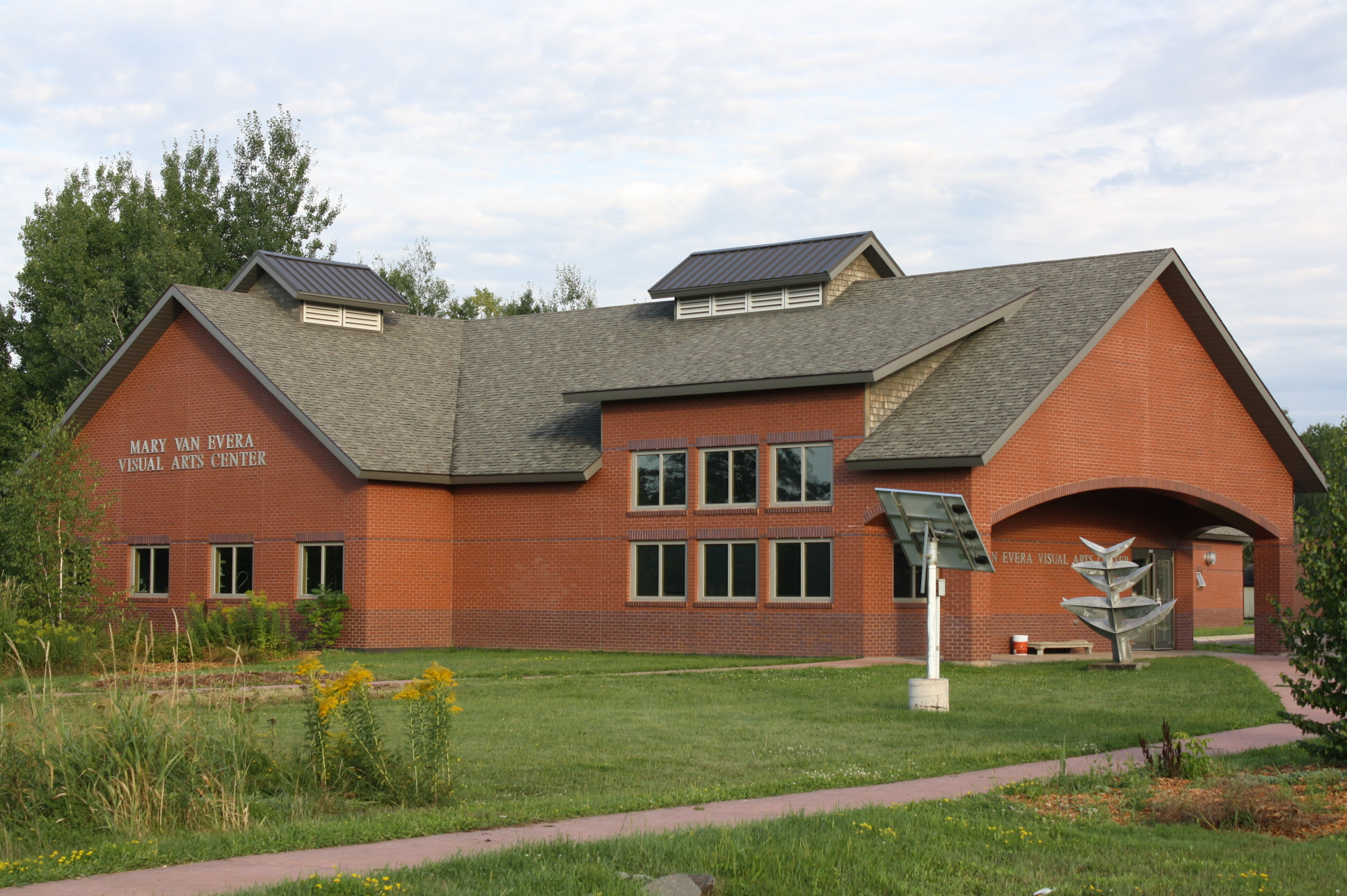
Mary Van Evera Visual Art Center

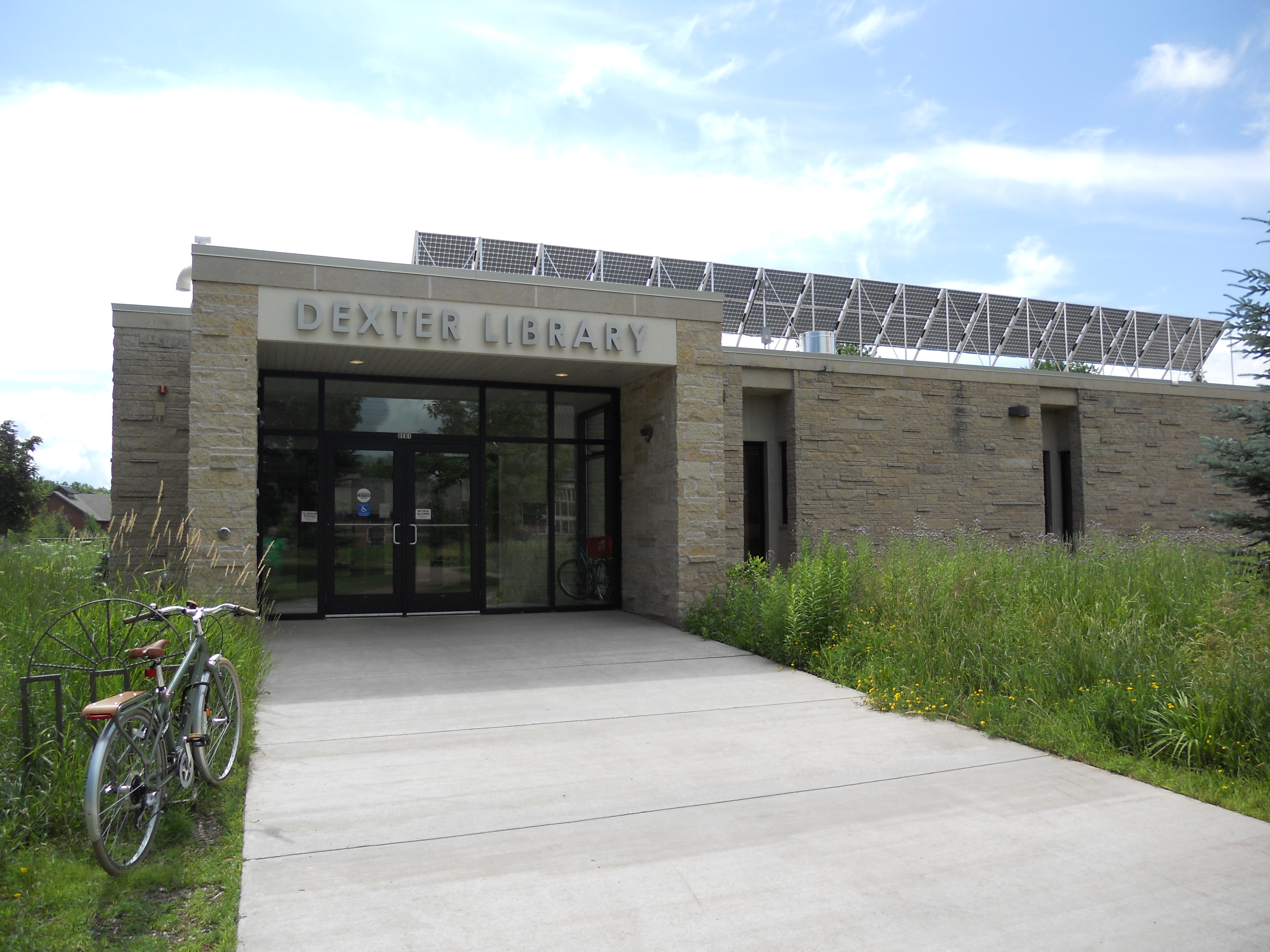
Dexter Library

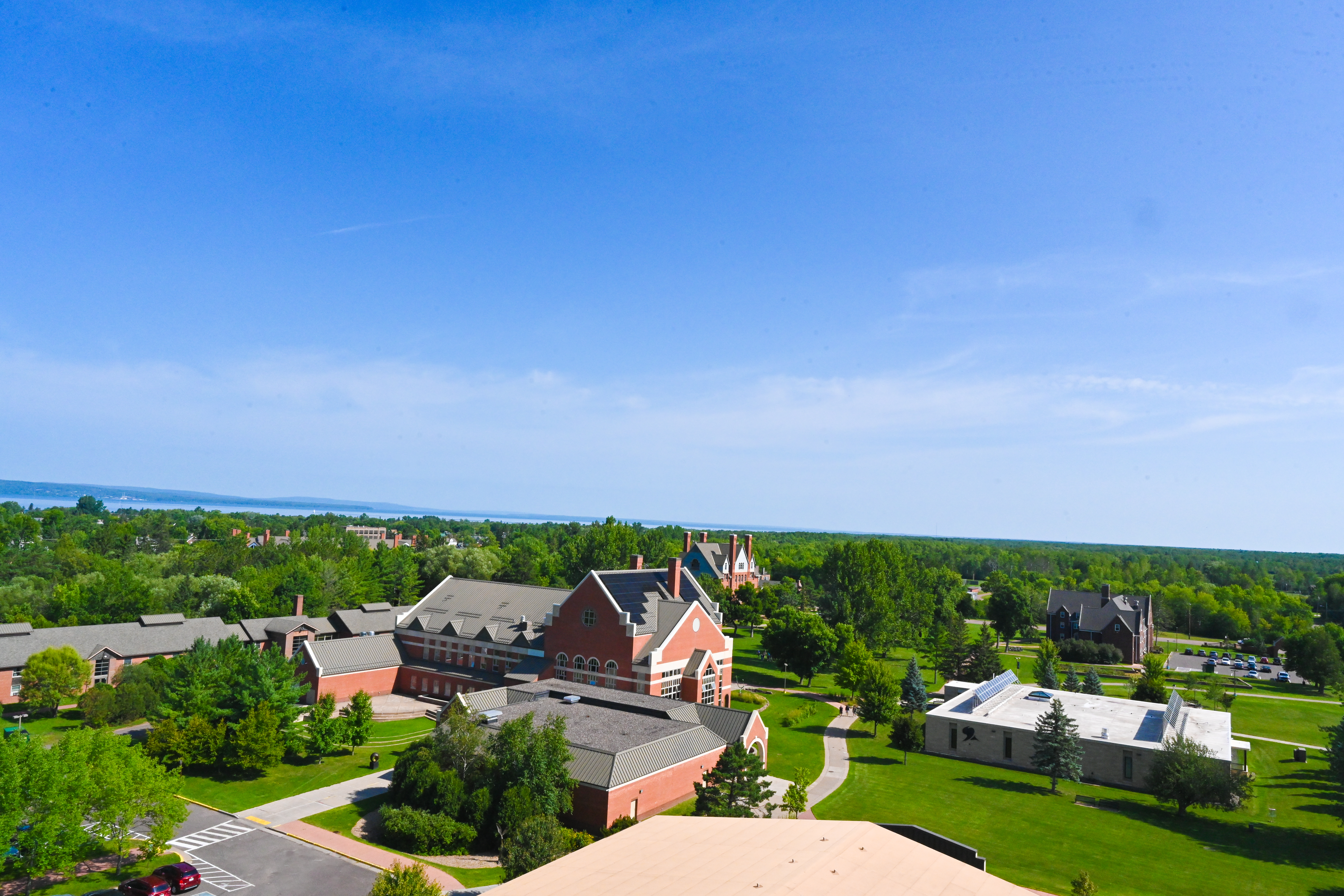
Aerial view of the campus

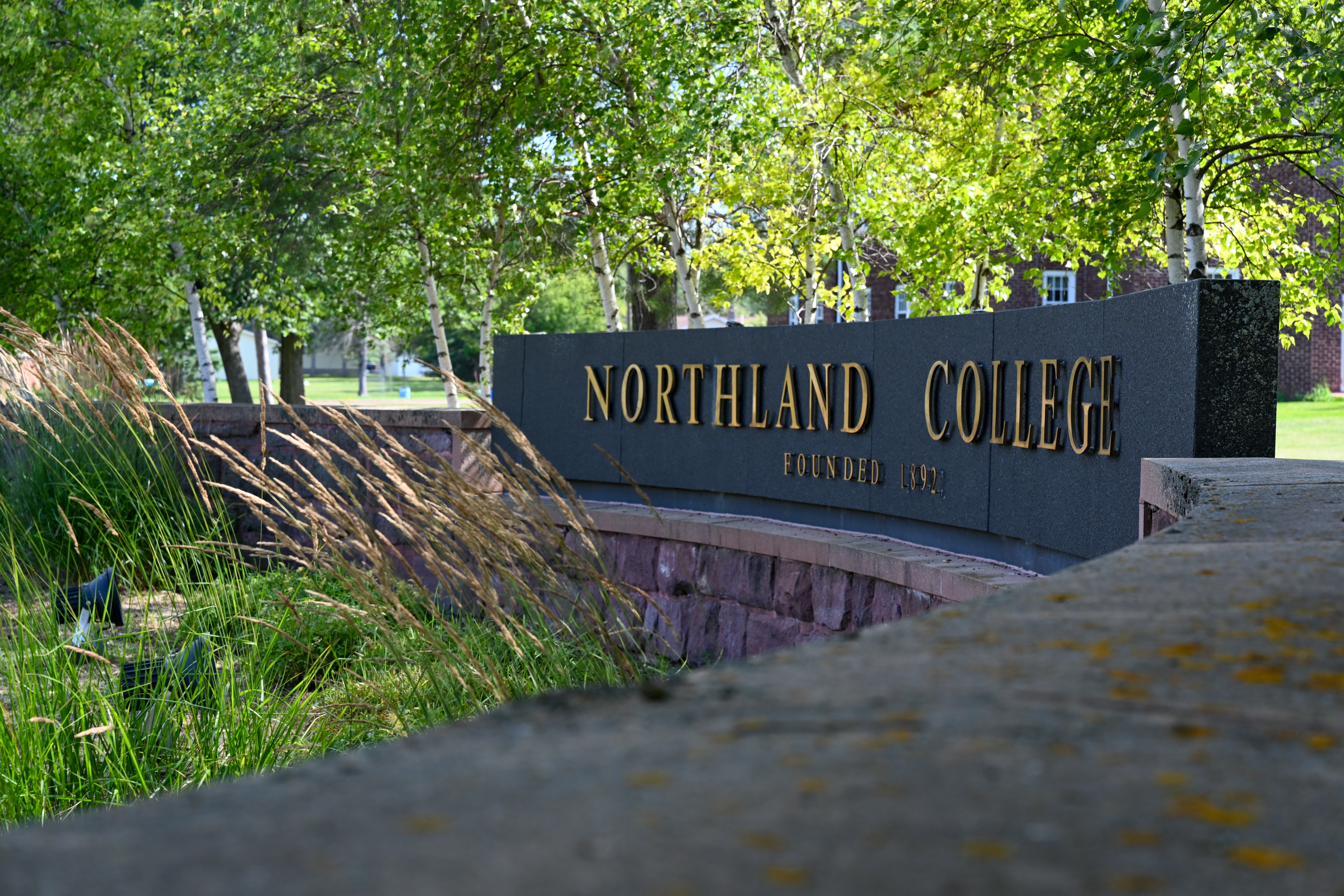
Entrance sign

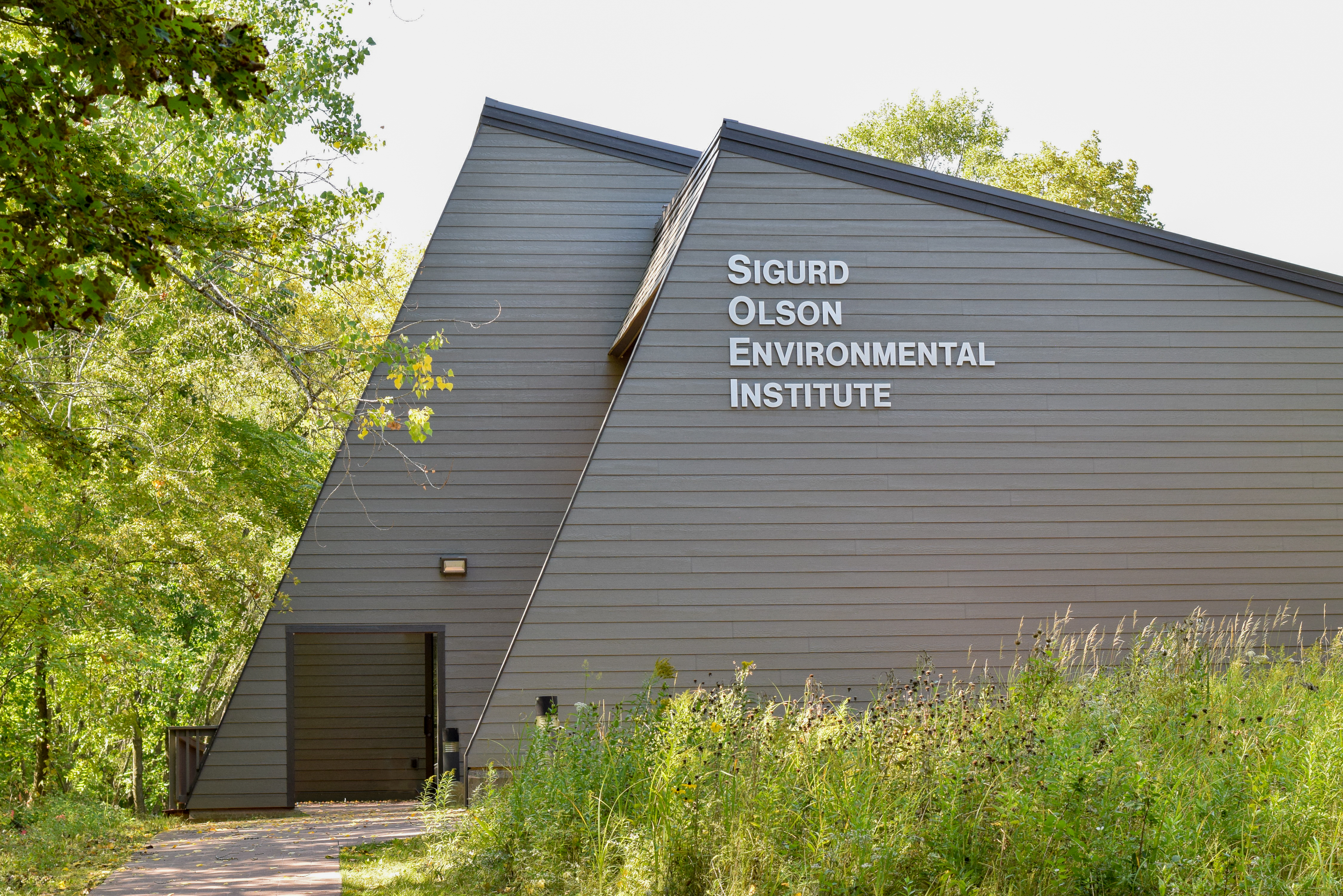
Sigurd Olson Environmental Institute

== Athletics ==
Northland athletics logo

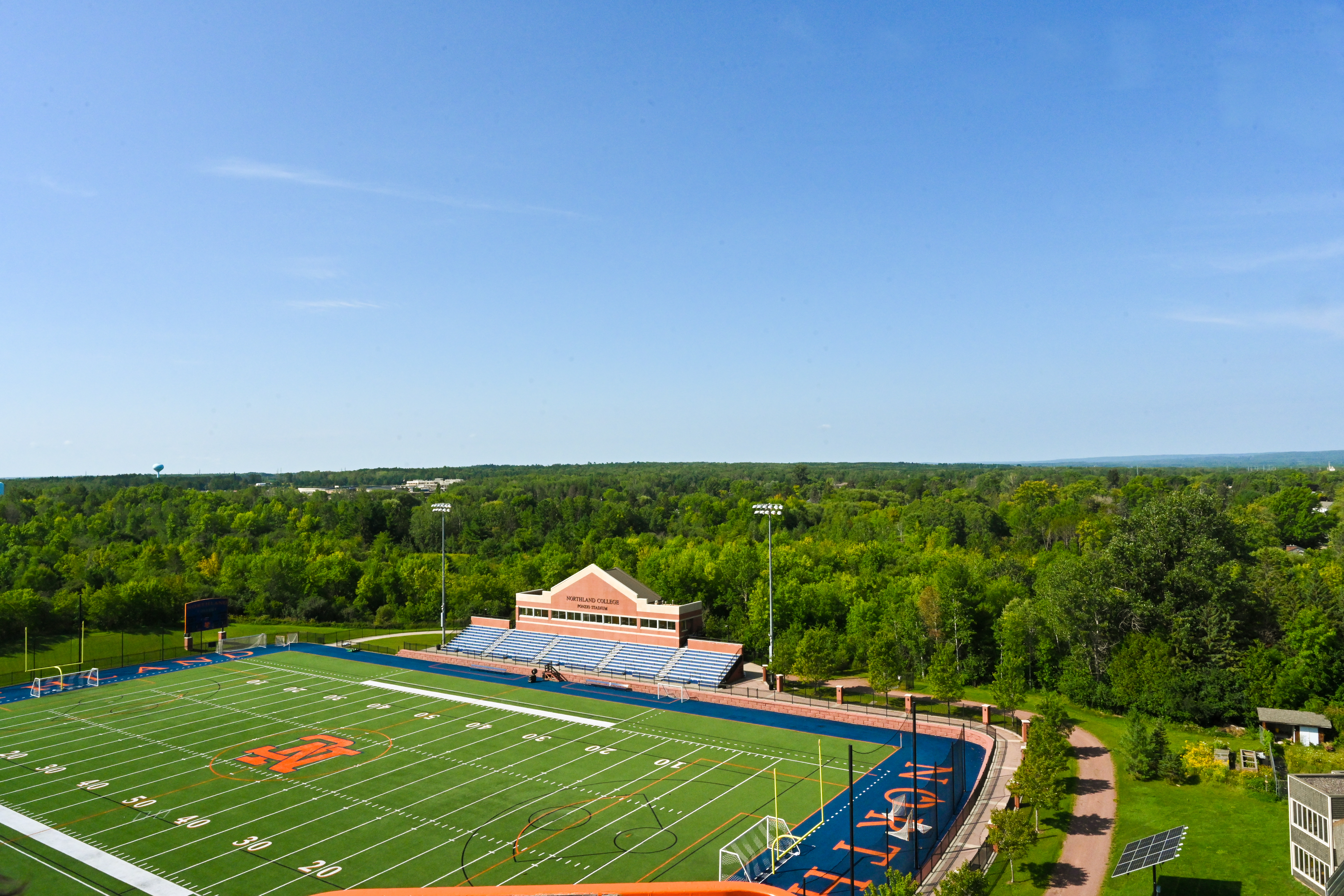
Ponzio Stadium

The school's athletic teams were called the LumberJacks and LumberJills. The school competed in NCAA Division III in all sports. It was a member of the Upper Midwest Athletic Conference and the Wisconsin Intercollegiate Athletic Conference (WIAC) for hockey. Northland was with the Northern Collegiate Hockey Association until 2019.

There were 15 varsity sports. The LumberJills competed in volleyball, soccer, cross country, basketball, golf, hockey, and softball. The LumberJacks competed in lacrosse, soccer, cross country, basketball, hockey, golf, and baseball. In December 2017, combo guard Brandon Galland put forward high scoring outputs in games against UW Superior and Bethany Lutheran College. Nordic Skiing was offered as a club sport for both men and women.

== Notable alumni ==
- Albin C. Bro, president of Shimer College
- Laurie E. Carlson, member of the Wisconsin State Assembly
- Paul Feldhausen, professional football player
- Stan Gruszynski, member of the Wisconsin State Assembly
- Barbara Linton, member of the Wisconsin State Assembly
- Beth Meyers, member of the Wisconsin State Assembly
- Jamling Tenzing Norgay, Nepali Sherpa mountain climber
- Sigurd F. Olson, author and environmentalist, non-graduate
- William Plizka, member of the Wisconsin State Assembly

== See also ==
- Sigurd Olson Environmental Institute
- WRNC-LP, student-owned radio station
