= Chanz Green =

21st century American politician

Member of the Wisconsin State Assembly from the 74th district
- Incumbent
- Assumed office January 3, 2023
- Preceded by: Beth Meyers

Personal details
- Born: Chanz Jeffery Green; January 29, 1991 (age 35) Wisconsin, U.S.
- Party: Republican
- Education: Northwood Technical College; University of Wisconsin, Extension
- Website: Campaign website

Chanz Jeffery Green (born January 29, 1991) is an American business owner and Republican politician from Bayfield County, Wisconsin. He is a member of the Wisconsin State Assembly, representing Wisconsin's 74th Assembly district since January 2023.

== Biography ==
Chanz Green was born and raised in rural northwest Wisconsin. He graduated from Amery High School and went to work in municipal utilities in Amery, Wisconsin, and rose to become assistant director of public works in Amery. In the meantime, he furthered his education with certificates from Northwood Technical College and University of Wisconsin–Extension programs.

In 2019, he was hired as utilities manager for Ashland, Wisconsin, and worked on a major redesign of the city's wastewater treatment system to prevent wastewater from overflowing into Lake Superior. Throughout these years he has also worked as a volunteer firefighter.

In 2021, he became the owner of a bar in Cable, Wisconsin, and started an event business to rent tables, chairs, and tents for outdoor events.

== Political career ==
Because of his bar ownership, Green became involved with the Tavern League of Wisconsin, a trade association with extensive political influence in the state. In January 2022, incumbent state representative Beth Meyers announced that she would not seek another term in the Assembly that Fall, creating an open seat in the 74th Assembly district. Green announced his candidacy for the Republican nomination three months later. He defeated electrician John Schey in the Republican primary and went on to face Democratic farmer John Adams in the general election. The 74th Assembly district has recently featured some of the closest elections in the state, and the 2022 was no exception —Green won by a margin of just 1,730 votes.

He took office in January 2023.

== Personal life and family ==
Chanz Green lives with his long-term girlfriend, Katie, in the rural town of Lincoln, in Bayfield County, Wisconsin. Green is an avid hunter and outdoorsman. He is a member of the National Rifle Association of America, Wisconsin Bear Hunters Association, and Hunter Nation.

== Electoral history ==
=== Wisconsin Assembly (2022–present) ===
| Year | Election | Date | Elected | | | | Defeated | | | | Total | Plurality |
|---|---|---|---|---|---|---|---|---|---|---|---|---|
| 2022 | Primary | Aug. 9 | Chanz Green | Republican | 4,327 | 67.41% | John A. Schey | Rep. | 2,084 | 32.47% | 6,419 | 2,243 |
| 2022 | General | Nov. 8 | Chanz Green | Republican | 16,006 | 52.84% | John Adams | Dem. | 14,276 | 47.13% | 30,293 | 1,730 |
| 2024 | Primary | Aug. 13 | Chanz J. Green (inc) | Republican | 3,955 | 56.43% | Scott Allen Harbridge | Rep. | 3,034 | 43.29% | 7,008 | 921 |
| 2024 | General | Nov. 5 | Chanz J. Green (inc) | Republican | 23,396 | 62.44% | Jeanne Rand Bruce | Dem. | 14,051 | 37.50% | 37,468 | 9,345 |
| 2026 | Primary | Aug. 11 | Chanz Green (inc) | Republican | 6,578 | 63.34% | Scott Harbridge | Rep. | 3,797 | 36.56% | 10,385 | 2,781 |
