= Foster Junction, Wisconsin =

- Ghost town
- Location within Wisconsin Location within the United States
- Coordinates: 46°18′49″N 90°42′15″W
- Country: United States
- State: Wisconsin
- County: Ashland
- Town: Morse
- Elevation: 1,270 ft (390 m)
- Time zone: UTC-6 (Central (CST))
  - Summer (DST): UTC-5 (CDT)
- Area codes: 715 & 534
- GNIS feature ID: 1579276

Foster Junction is a ghost town located in Ashland County, Wisconsin, United States. The former community was on present day County Highway GG, 2.2 miles west of Mellen. The community was named for George E. Foster, a partner in the Mellon Lumber Company. The company founded Foster Junction in 1910.

Foster Junction failed to thrive, and many of its buildings were dismantled and relocated to Mellen. Foster Junction no longer had any residents by the 1930s.
