= Gary Sherman (politician) =

American politician and judge (born 1949)

Judge of the Wisconsin Court of Appeals for the 4th district
- In office May 12, 2010 – July 4, 2019
- Appointed by: Jim Doyle
- Preceded by: Burnie Bridge
- Succeeded by: Rachel A. Graham

Member of the Wisconsin State Assembly from the 74th district
- In office January 4, 1999 – May 12, 2010
- Preceded by: Barbara Linton
- Succeeded by: Janet Bewley

Personal details
- Born: May 5, 1949 (age 77) Chicago, Illinois, U.S.
- Party: Democratic
- Spouse: Jean A. Kusel (m. 1970)
- Education: University of Wisconsin–Madison; University of Wisconsin Law School
- Profession: attorney

Military service
- Allegiance: United States
- Branch/service: United States Air Force; U.S. Air Force Reserve
- Years of service: 1973 (USAF); 1973–1977 (USAFR)

Gary E. Sherman (born May 5, 1949) is a retired American lawyer and Democratic politician from Bayfield County, Wisconsin. He served nine years as a judge of the Wisconsin Court of Appeals in the Madison-based 4th district (2010–2019). He previously served 11 years as a member of the Wisconsin State Assembly, representing the 74th Assembly district from 1999 to 2010, and was president of the State Bar of Wisconsin from 1994 to 1995.

== Early life and education ==
Gary Sherman was born and raised in Chicago, Illinois. He graduated from Chicago's A. G. Lane Technical High School in 1966 and went on to attend the University of Wisconsin–Madison. While in college, Sherman became active with several protest movements that were popular on campus at the time, joining in a sit-in to demand the university establish an ethnic studies program in 1967. He graduated with his bachelor's degree in history in 1970.

During college, he also enrolled in the Reserve Officers' Training Corps with the United States Air Force, which agreed to defer his active duty status while he continued his education in law school. After earning his J.D. from the University of Wisconsin Law School, in 1973, he went on active duty with the Air Force. He was assigned to the Duluth Air National Guard Base, where he served as a legal advisor to the base commander. He served only 92 days on active duty, followed by four years inactive with the United States Air Force Reserve.

== Legal and political career ==
After leaving the Air Force, Sherman moved to the city of Washburn, in far northern Bayfield County, Wisconsin, near his wife's former residence. They had visited the area frequently during their college years, and became part of a community of young idealists who moved into the area in the 1970s. They purchased 120 acres of land, but took several years to build a house on the land. In the meantime they lived in a small shack on their property.

He worked briefly for a small law firm in Washburn, before going into private practice on his own. In this practice, much of his practice was in municipal law, litigating sewage and water systems. During these years, he also wrote a new edition of Wisconsin Methods of Practice, a reference for how to practice law in the state. Sherman had found the book useful as a young lawyer, and was perplexed why he hadn't been receiving updates. After contacting the publisher, he was told they didn't have anyone writing updates, and the content needed a thorough rewrite. Sherman took on the work, writing it over the course of several years.

Recognized for his work, Sherman was elected to the board of governors of the State Bar of Wisconsin in the 1980s, and was elected president in 1994. During his presidency, he led efforts to digitize legal reference materials.

His term as president ended in 1995, and he then served a year as "past president". After that, Sherman chose to run for a soon-to-be open seat on the Wisconsin Court of Appeals in the Wausau-based 3rd district. He faced Marathon County circuit judge Michael W. Hoover in the Spring 1997 general election. He spent $120,000 of his own money on the race, but lost by 15 points.

Following that election loss, Sherman received a call from George Brown, the State Bar's lobbyist in Madison, who informed him that the state representative in his home district was retiring. Sherman entered the contest for the Democratic Party nomination in the 74th Assembly district. Name recognition from his recent judicial campaign helped him in the Democratic primary, where he defeated two opponents, receiving 40% of the vote. He went on to receive 57% in the general election, defeating the Republican candidate, attorney Thomas Duffy. Sherman would win re-election five times.

In 2009, Judge Burnie Bridge of the Wisconsin Court of Appeals announced he would step down at the end of the year. Governor Jim Doyle announced that he would seek applicants for the appointment, and Sherman decided to put his name. After an extensive interview process, Doyle named Sherman as successor to Bridge. Sherman formally took up the seat on May 12, 2010, resigning from the Assembly the same day. Sherman described his work on the Court of Appeals as the hardest work of his life.

He was elected to a full term in 2014, without opposition. He served most of that term, but announced his retirement in 2019, leaving office July 4 of that year.

== Later years ==
Since leaving office, he has worked as a part time court commissioner in Bayfield County, though he spends a significant amount of time in Tucson, Arizona.

== Electoral history ==
=== Wisconsin Court of Appeals (1997) ===
Wisconsin Court of Appeals, 3rd District Election, 1997
Party	Candidate	Votes	%	±%
General Election, April 1, 1997
Nonpartisan	Michael W. Hoover	100,936	57.37%	
Nonpartisan	Gary E. Sherman	74,989	42.63%	
Plurality		25,947	14.75%	
Total votes		175,925	100.0%	

=== Wisconsin Assembly (1998–2008) ===
Year	Election	Date	Elected				Defeated				Total	Plurality
1998	Primary	Sep. 8	Gary E. Sherman	Democratic	2,064	39.88%	Mike Kinney	Dem.	1,629	31.48%	5,175	435
1998	Primary	Sep. 8	Gary E. Sherman	Democratic	2,064	39.88%	Karen Kuester	Dem.	1,482	28.64%	5,175	435
1998	General	Nov. 3	Gary E. Sherman	Democratic	10,734	57.09%	Tom Duffy	Rep.	8,068	42.91%	18,802	2,666
2000	General	Nov. 3	Gary E. Sherman (inc)	Democratic	15,130	61.61%	Connie Loden	Rep.	9,426	38.38%	24,557	5,704
2002	General	Nov. 5	Gary E. Sherman (inc)	Democratic	13,365	99.82%	--unopposed--				13,389	13,341
2004	General	Nov. 2	Gary E. Sherman (inc)	Democratic	16,213	53.14%	Barbara Linton	Rep.	14,134	46.33%	30,509	2,079
2004	General	Nov. 2	Gary E. Sherman (inc)	Democratic	16,213	53.14%	Eugene Bigboy Sr.	Ind.	160	0.52%	30,509	2,079
2006	General	Nov. 7	Gary E. Sherman (inc)	Democratic	13,590	62.55%	Shirl LaBarre	Rep.	8,121	37.38%	21,728	5,469
2008	General	Nov. 4	Gary E. Sherman (inc)	Democratic	18,051	62.38%	Shirl LaBarre	Rep.	10,874	37.58%	28,939	7,177

Political offices
Preceded by Barbara Linton	Member of the Wisconsin State Assembly from the 74th district January 4, 1999 – May 12, 2010	Succeeded by Janet Bewley
Legal offices
Preceded by Burnie Bridge	Judge of the Wisconsin Court of Appeals for the 4th district May 12, 2010 – July 4, 2019	Succeeded by Rachel A. Graham
