= Rachel A. Graham =

American judge, Wisconsin Court of Appeals

The Honorable Rachel A. Graham

Judge of the Wisconsin Court of Appeals District IV
- Incumbent
- Assumed office July 4, 2019
- Appointed by: Tony Evers
- Preceded by: Gary Sherman

Personal details
- Born: June 7, 1976 (age 50) Stevens Point, Wisconsin, U.S.
- Education: Northwestern University (BA); University of Wisconsin Law School (JD)

Rachel Anne Graham (born June 7, 1976) is an American lawyer, currently serving as judge of the Wisconsin Court of Appeals in the Madison-based District IV court. She was appointed in 2019 by Wisconsin Governor Tony Evers.

== Early life and education ==
Born in Stevens Point, Wisconsin, Graham graduated from Stevens Point Area Senior High School in 1994. After earning her bachelor's degree from Northwestern University in 1998, she went to work for several years as a special education teacher in Baton Rouge, Louisiana, and worked as a curriculum specialist at various education non-profits.

She returned to school to obtain her Juris Doctor, graduating from the University of Wisconsin Law School in 2008. During law school, she worked as a student attorney with the Wisconsin Innocence Project and was senior managing editor of the Wisconsin International Law Journal.

== Legal career ==
In 2011, she served as a law clerk to Wisconsin Supreme Court Justice Ann Walsh Bradley. She was clerking for Justice Bradley during the infamous altercation between Bradley and fellow-Justice David Prosser Jr., in which Prosser grabbed Bradley by the neck. Graham was one of several court staffers interviewed in the investigation and pointed to pressure from the state legislature as having damaged relations between the justices.

Following her clerkship, Graham was hired by the national law firm Quarles & Brady in their Madison office, working in commercial litigation. While working at Quarles & Brady, she was also volunteering as a commissioner on Wisconsin's National and Community Service Board, having been appointed in 2010. She remained at Quarles & Brady until her appointment to the Wisconsin Court of Appeals in 2019.

== Judicial career ==
On June 13, 2019, Wisconsin Governor Tony Evers announced the appointment of Graham to the Wisconsin Court of Appeals, to the seat vacated by the retirement of Judge Gary Sherman. Judge Graham was the first judicial appointment of Tony Evers' governorship. She won re-election without opposition in the 2020 election.

== Electoral history ==
=== Wisconsin Appeals Court (2020) ===
Wisconsin Court of Appeals District IV Election, 2020
Party	Candidate	Votes	%	±%
General Election, April 7, 2020
Nonpartisan	Rachel A. Graham (incumbent)	341,286	99.42%	
	Scattering	1,996	0.58%	
Total votes		343,282	100.0%	

Legal offices
Preceded by Gary Sherman	Judge of the Wisconsin Court of Appeals District IV; 2019–present	Incumbent
