= Sigurd Olson Environmental Institute =

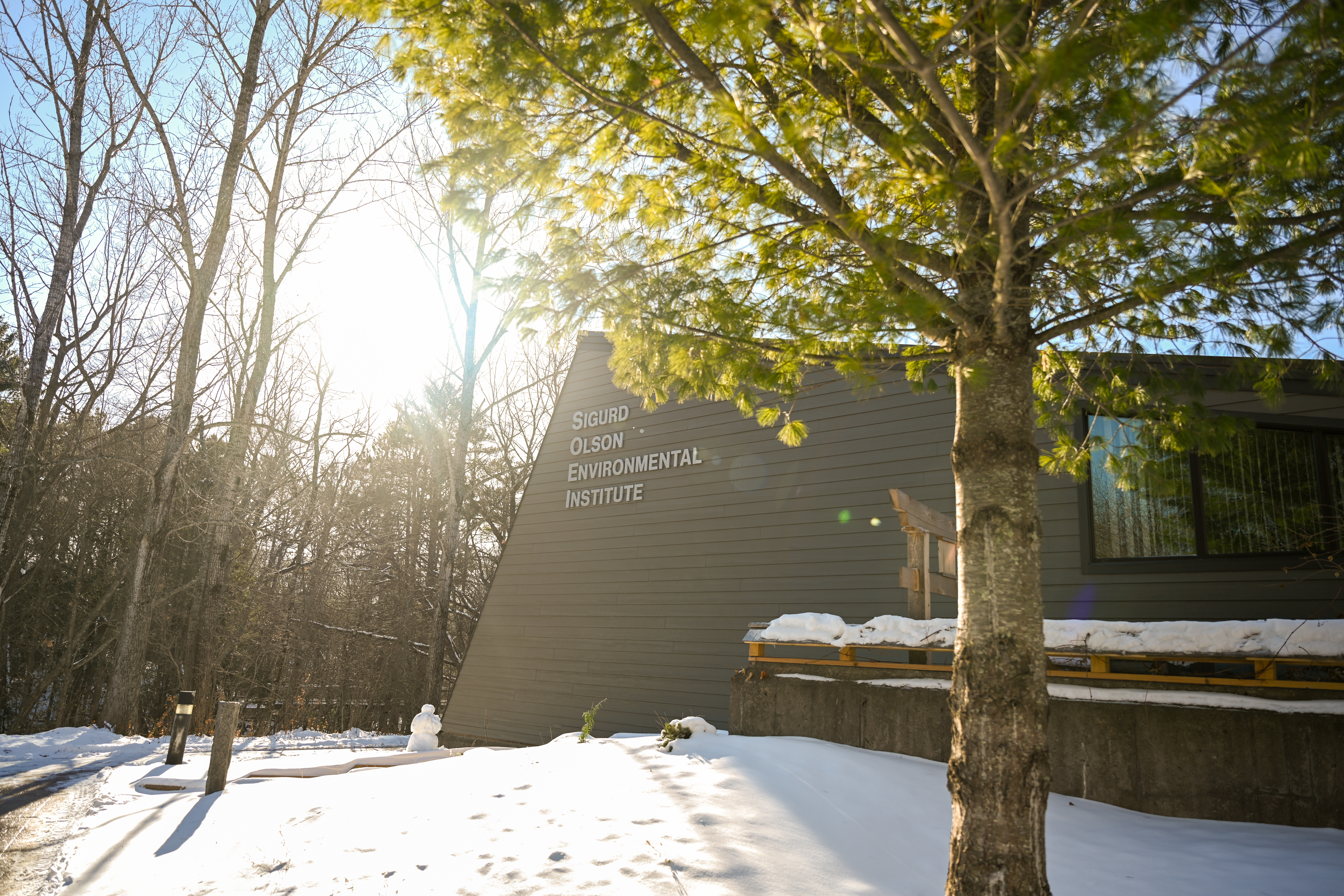

The Sigurd Olson Environmental Institute is an outreach arm of Northland College in Ashland, Wisconsin. The institute originated in 1971 at an environmental conference at Northland that hosted Sigurd Olson as a speaker. Robert Matteson was the founder of the institute. The Institute opened in Spring, 1972.

== LoonWatch ==
LoonWatch, a program of the Sigurd Olson Environmental Institute, protects common loons and their aquatic habitats through education, monitoring, and research. Though their primary focus is Wisconsin, their education and research activities extend to Upper Great Lakes region, such as Michigan and Minnesota. The Watch also lends support to North American conservation efforts by working with loon conservation organizations across the United States and Canada. LoonWatch, it's Advisory Council, and volunteers are all working toward common goals of loon conservation and protection.

== Sigurd F. Olson Nature Writing Award ==
In 1974, inspirational conservationist and writer Sigurd F. Olson won the John Burroughs Medal for his book, Wilderness Days. Since 1992, and in the spirit of celebrating Sigurd's literary legacy, the Sigurd Olson Environmental Institute (SOEI) at Northland College has recognized remarkable environmental adult literature that attempts to capture the spirit of the human relationship with the natural world, and promotes the values that preserve or restore the land for future generations.

Since 2004, the SOEI has recognized a children's book of literacy nature writing—nonfiction or fiction—that captures the spirit of the human relationship with nature, and promotes the awareness, preservation, appreciation, or restoration of the natural world for future generations.

== Land and Water Stewardship ==
The Sigurd Olson Environmental Institute has a long history of combining programs, workshops, and outreach activities to assist with environmental protection and restoration in the Lake Superior region. Working collaboratively with private landowners, businesses, public agencies and tribal governments Northland College faculty, staff and students utilize a unique interdisciplinary approach to assessment, monitoring and planning. This collaborative approach provides services to the community and hands on engagement for our students. Current projects cover a spectrum that includes environmental monitoring, outreach education, community-based research, planning, and restoration.

== Lake Superior Binational Forum ==
The Lake Superior Binational Forum is a model partnership of 24 volunteer members from various sectors including small businesses, environmental organizations, industry, Native Americans, First Nations and academia. Its purpose is to provide input and analysis to the governments about critical issues relating to Lake Superior such as discharge of toxic substances, pollution prevention and restoration efforts. The members are also responsible for developing creative new strategies for eliminating pollutants and contributing toward the foundation of a sustainable economy.

== Apostle Island School ==
Apostle Island School is an environmental education program aimed at providing regional youth with an outdoor experience to increase students' awareness of both the regional history and the wide array of local resources of the Apostle Islands National Lakeshore and Lake Superior.

Island School runs each May and is held on various islands in the Apostle Islands archipelago. Sigurd Olson Environmental Institute started developing this unique learning experience in 1985 in cooperation with the Northland College Outdoor Education Department and the Apostle Islands National Lakeshore. For 19 years, the program curriculum and instruction has been led by outdoor education students at Northland College as part of their senior capstone. The Apostle Island School program works in collaboration with the Northland College Outdoor Education Department, the Apostle Islands National Lakeshore, and the Apostle Island Cruise Service.
