= DeWitt LLP =

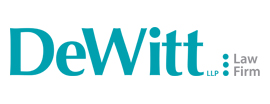
- Headquarters: Madison, Wisconsin
- No. of offices: 4
- No. of attorneys: 133
- No. of employees: 225
- Key people: Timothy Stewart (President & managing partner)
- Date founded: 1903
- Founder: William R. Bagley
- Company type: C corporation
- Website: dewittllp.com

DeWitt LLP is a U.S. law firm based in Madison, Wisconsin. It is the largest firm in the Greater Madison Area, with an office in Minneapolis, Minnesota, and is among the ten largest firms in the State of Wisconsin.

== History ==
The firm was founded in 1903 by William Bagley (1860-1938), an attorney and the designated master of ceremonies when William D. Hoard was inaugurated as the 16th Governor of Wisconsin in 1888. The firm as it exists today is the result of a 1994 merger between two Madison firms, DeWitt Porter and Ross & Stevens. Ross & Stevens brought expertise in employee benefits and intellectual property law, and DeWitt Porter brought environmental law and lobbying practices. Jack R. DeWitt, a founding partner, died in 2012. In 2013 DeWitt Ross & Stevens combined with the Minneapolis, Minnesota law firm of Mackall Crounse & Moore. Its office in Minneapolis conducts business as DeWitt Mackall Crounse & Moore. On January 1, 2019, DeWitt Ross & Stevens S.C. and DeWitt Mackall Crounse & Moore S.C. reorganized into one entity to become DeWitt LLP.

== Practice ==
The firm has lawyers in areas including corporate law, employment, environmental law, employee benefits, government relations, health care, litigation, real estate, tax, estate planning, family law, immigration, personal injury, intellectual property law, patents, trademarks and copyright law. The firm’s Government Relations Team has the largest group of lobbyists in the state. As of July 2014 Bradley C. Fulton is the firm’s President and Managing Partner. Attorney Jordan Lamb was involved with the creation and implementation of the Great Lakes Compact in Wisconsin on behalf of Wisconsin agriculture.

== Notable lawyers and alumni ==
- Donald L. Bach, former Chief of Staff and Legal Counsel to Governor Tommy Thompson. Chair of the Pardon Advisory Board. Deputy Secretary of Department of Revenue.
- Louis B. Butler Jr., former justice of the Wisconsin Supreme Court
- Jack R. DeWitt, former State Bar of Wisconsin President, World War II recipient of the Distinguished Service Cross while serving with the Army's 14th Armored Division (United States)
- Daniel W. Hildebrand, former State Bar of Wisconsin President
- Cari Anne Renlund, former Chief Legal Counsel for the Wisconsin Department of Administration under Governors Jim Doyle and Scott Walker
- Patience D. Roggensack, 26th Chief Justice of the Wisconsin Supreme Court
- Myron Stevens, the son of Wisconsin Supreme Court Justice E. Ray Stevens
- Robert D. Sundby, Judge of the Wisconsin Court of Appeals
- J. B. Van Hollen, 43rd Attorney General of Wisconsin

== Awards ==
- Readers of Corporate Report Wisconsin named DeWitt Ross & Stevens as the Platinum Winner of "Best of Wisconsin Businesses" in the Best Law Firm category in 2010.
- The firm is currently rated an A+ with the Better Business Bureau

== Offices ==
- Madison, Wisconsin
- Milwaukee, Wisconsin
- Minneapolis, Minnesota
- Green Bay, Wisconsin
