= Penokee, Wisconsin =

- Ghost town
- Location within Wisconsin Location within the United States
- Coordinates: 46°18′52″N 90°41′37″W
- Country: United States
- State: Wisconsin
- County: Ashland
- Town: Morse
- Elevation: 1,265 ft (386 m)
- Time zone: UTC-6 (Central (CST))
  - Summer (DST): UTC-5 (CDT)
- Area codes: 715 & 534

Penokee is a ghost town located in the township of Morse, Ashland County, Wisconsin, United States. The old town was located south of County Highway GG, a few yards west of the railway at the Penokee Gap. Canadian National Railway 1.75 miles (2.82 km) west-southwest of Mellen The community takes its name from the Native American work apinikan, which means "wild potato ground". It was marked on local property maps through 1992, and is still marked on Wisconsin Department of Transportation maps.
