= John T. Manske =

American politician

Member of the Wisconsin State Assembly from the 47th district
- In office 1981–1986

Personal details
- Born: November 6, 1952 (age 73) Edgerton, Wisconsin, U.S.
- Party: Republican
- Education: University of Wisconsin-Whitewater; University of Wisconsin-Madison
- Profession: Politician

John T. Manske (born November 6, 1952) is an American politician. He was a member of the Wisconsin State Assembly.

== Early life ==
Manske was born in Edgerton, Wisconsin. He graduated from Milton High School in Milton, Wisconsin before obtaining a B.S. from the University of Wisconsin-Whitewater and an M.A. from the University of Wisconsin-Madison. Manske worked as a part-time college instructor and production worker before beginning his political career.

== Career ==
He was elected as a Republican candidate to the Milton City Council in 1973. He served on the city council from 1973-1977 and from 1979-1981. In 1981, he won a special election to serve as a member of the Wisconsin State Assembly representing the 47th district. He won reelection in 1982 and 1984, serving as a member of the Assembly from 1981 until 1986. In 1988, he was hired by the Illinois chapter of Common Cause to serve as its executive director.
