= Janet Bewley (politician) =

American politician, Minority Leader of the Wisconsin Senate

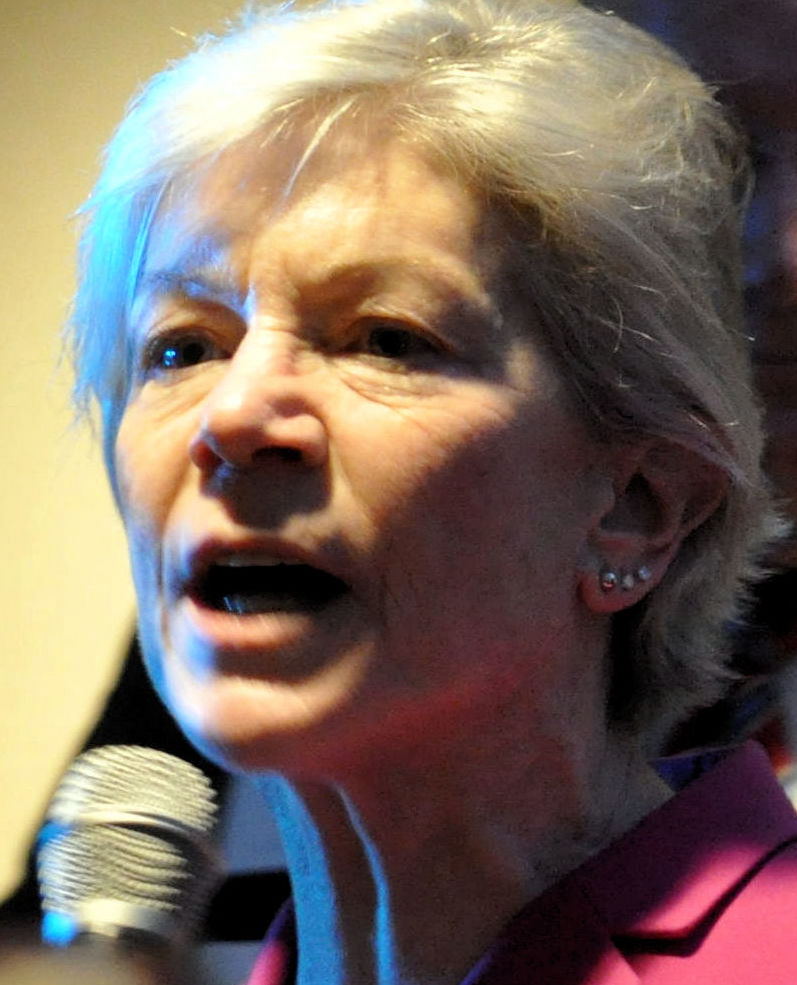

Minority Leader of the Wisconsin Senate
- In office April 24, 2020 – January 3, 2023
- Preceded by: Jennifer Shilling
- Succeeded by: Melissa Agard

Member of the Wisconsin Senate from the 25th district
- In office January 3, 2015 – January 3, 2023
- Preceded by: Robert Jauch
- Succeeded by: Romaine Quinn

Member of the Wisconsin State Assembly from the 74th district
- In office January 3, 2011 – January 3, 2015
- Preceded by: Gary Sherman
- Succeeded by: Beth Meyers

Personal details
- Born: November 10, 1951 (age 74) Cleveland, Ohio, U.S.
- Party: Democratic
- Spouse: David Saetre
- Children: 3
- Education: Case Western Reserve University (BA); University of Maine (MEd)

Janet Bewley (born November 10, 1951) is an American politician and former Democratic minority leader in the Wisconsin State Senate. She was a member of the Wisconsin Senate from 2015 through 2023, and previously served four years in the Wisconsin State Assembly, representing Iron, Ashland, Bayfield, and Price counties in the northwest of the state.

== Biography ==
Born in Cleveland, Ohio, Bewley graduated from Cleveland's James Ford Rhodes High School in 1969 and earned her B.A. from Case Western Reserve University. She was the first member of her family to graduate from college and went on to earn a Master's in Academic Administration from the University of Maine in 1977. She was elected to the Wisconsin State Assembly in 2010, replacing Gary Sherman (who did not seek re-election). Before being elected to the assembly, she served on the city council of Ashland. She is a former community relations officer for the Wisconsin Housing and Economic Development Authority.

On December 16, 2013, Bewley announced her intention to run for the Wisconsin Senate, District 25, to replace retiring Senator Robert Jauch, also a Democrat. She won the primary election with 72% of the vote and was opposed by Republican Dane Deutsch (Jauch's 2010 opponent) in the November general election. Her old seat was contested by Democrat Beth Meyers and Republican Jamey Francis in the November 2014 general election. On November 4, 2014, Bewley was elected to the Wisconsin State Senate, and Meyers was elected to Bewley's old Assembly seat.

On April 24, 2020, the Wisconsin Senate Democratic Caucus chose Bewley as their new leader after the resignation of Senator Jennifer Shilling from that role.

On July 22, 2022, Bewley was involved in a fatal car crash, killing a mother and her daughter. She drove her car out of a public beach to turn east onto U.S. Highway 2. Her car was struck by a vehicle driven by 27-year-old Alyssa Ortman, which was driving west at roughly 100 mph. Ortman's car was forced across the highway and hit a third car that was traveling east. Both Ortman and her five-year-old daughter were killed in the crash. Bewley was talking on the phone with a reporter from the Milwaukee Journal Sentinel at the time of the crash and had had eye surgery the day before. She was not charged, and a further wrongful death suit filed against her was dismissed.

Bewley did not run for reelection in 2022.

Wisconsin Senate
Preceded by Robert Jauch	Member of the Wisconsin Senate from the 25th district 2015–2023	Succeeded by Romaine Quinn
Preceded by Jennifer Shilling	Minority Leader of the Wisconsin Senate; 2020–2023	Succeeded by Melissa Agard
