= Barbara Linton =

American politician

Barb Linton

Member of the Wisconsin State Assembly from the 74th district
- In office January 5, 1987 – July 31, 1998
- Preceded by: William Plizka
- Succeeded by: Gary Sherman

Personal details
- Born: June 27, 1952 (age 74) Ashland, Wisconsin
- Party: Democratic
- Relations: Married, 2 children
- Education: Northland College

Barbara J. Linton, (born June 27, 1952) was a Wisconsin politician and legislator. She served in the Wisconsin State Assembly from 1987 to 1998.

Born in Ashland, Wisconsin, she attended Northland College, and currently lives in High Bridge. She was the Ashland County Board Supervisor from 1984 to 1986. While serving in the State Assembly as a Democrat for 12 years, she later ran unsuccessfully as a Republican.
