= Telemark Lodge =

Ski area in Wisconsin, United States

Coordinates: 46°11′24.2″N 91°14′51.5″W

Telemark Lodge (formally known as the Telemark Resort and Convention Center) was a resort in the lakes district of Bayfield County, Wisconsin, United States. It was located within the Town of Cable and two miles east of the unincorporated settlement of Cable prior to its demolition in April 2021.

== History ==
Telemark was founded as an alpine ski area by Tony Wise in 1947, one of the first in the United States. A lodge was built in 1972 but struggled financially as ski lifts and less costly airfare opened up bigger hills. Telemark added a large facility, the Colosseum, in December 1980, that provided indoor tennis and new facilities for the ski hill and the cross country ski area, which was "partially dismantled" by 1998.

The lodge was a cross country ski destination through the 1980s, but declined along with U.S. cross country skiing. The lodge endured four bankruptcies: in 1984, 1998, and 2010. The third bankruptcy resulted in a foreclosure of the property, and a closure of the resort. It closed on May 5, 2010, and re-opened again in January 2011 after a sale was made that month. Telemark Hospitality LLC then began an extensive remodeling project during 2011. On April 2, 2013, once again the storied Telemark Lodge and its property closed due to various difficulties including a fourth bankruptcy.

In October 2013, the lodge was purchased by Newco, a private Colorado-based company, now going by the name of Mount Telemark Properties LLC. However, renovations were too costly and the Lodge was closed for the 2014 winter season.

Mount Telemark Properties offered part of the purchased property (including the lodge itself) to Central Cross Country Ski Association ("CXC") in an effort to preserve the start location of the American Birkebeiner. After years of neglect it was demolished in 2021.

== American Birkebeiner ==
Telemark Lodge was home to the American Birkebeiner cross-country skiing event founded by Tony Wise in 1973. Tony got his inspiration for the event from Norway's Birkebeiner. The race attracted thousands of skiers and spectators to the resort in late February each year, and in fact was the largest annual event for the resort.

== Culinary history ==
Emeril Lagasse was a chef at Telemark Lodge from 1978 to 1980.

== Telemark Resort ski hill statistics ==
- Base: 1320 ft (402 m)
- Summit: 1700 ft (518 m)
- Vertical Rise: 380 ft (115 m)
- 46.186673°, -91.250940°
