= Barksdale =

Barksdale may refer to:

== Places ==
- Barksdale, Mississippi, an unincorporated community
- Barksdale, Texas, an unincorporated community
- Barksdale, Wisconsin, a town
  - Barksdale (community), Wisconsin, an unincorporated community
- Barksdale Air Force Base

== People with the surname ==
- Alfred D. Barksdale (1892–1972), American soldier, Virginia lawyer, legislator and judge
- David Barksdale (1947–1974), American gang leader from Chicago
- Don Barksdale (1923–1993), American professional basketball player
- Ethelbert Barksdale (1824–1893), Confederate congressman, author of a bill to arm slaves, and later US Congressman
- Eugene Hoy Barksdale (1896–1926), American aviator
- James L. Barksdale (born 1943), investment fund manager, U.S. Senate candidate in Georgia (2016)
- Lance Barksdale (born 1967), Major League Baseball umpire
- Mary Barksdale (1920–1992), African-American nurse, businesswoman, and civil rights activist
- Nathan Barksdale (1961-2016), a West Baltimore drug dealer and a subject of the documentary Baltimore Chronicles Legends of the Unwired
- Rhesa Barksdale (born 1944), Senior United States Circuit Judge
- William Barksdale (1821–1863), American lawyer, politician, and Confederate general

== Fictional entities ==
- Amy Barksdale, a character in the animated series Daria
- Rita Barksdale, a character in the animated series Daria
- Barksdale Organization, a fictional drug dealing gang on the television series The Wire
  - Avon Barksdale, a character in The Wire played by Wood Harris
  - Brianna Barksdale, a character in The Wire played by Charlene "Michael" Hyatt
  - D'Angelo Barksdale, a character in The Wire played by Larry Gilliard, Jr.
  - Tyrell Barksdale, D'Angelo and Donette's son in The Wire
