= Lake Namakagon =

Lake in Wisconsin, United States

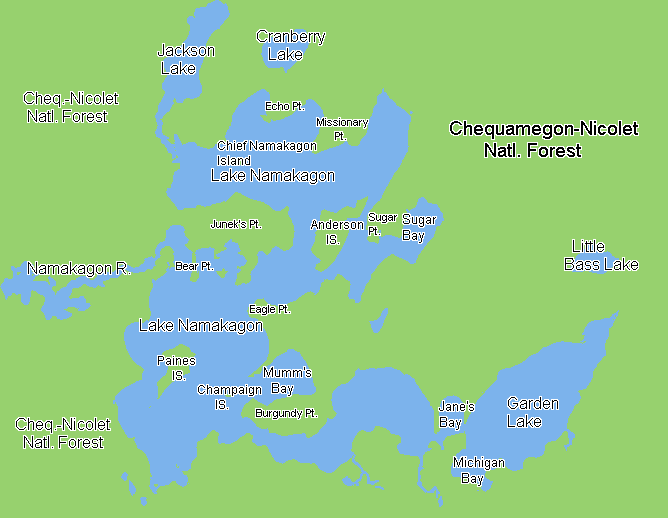

- Location within Wisconsin Location within the United States
- Location: Bayfield County, Wisconsin near Cable, Wisconsin
- Coordinates: 46°12′57″N 91°06′40″W
- Type: Glacial lake
- Primary inflows: Namakagon River
- Basin countries: United States
- Surface area: 2,897 acres (1,172 ha)
- Average depth: 38 ft (12 m)
- Max. depth: 51 ft (16 m)
- Water volume: 52,032 acre-feet (64.181×10^{6} m^{3})
- Shore length^{1}: 43.67 mi (70.28 km)
- Surface elevation: 1,394 ft (425 m)
- Islands: Paines Island, Anderson Island
- Settlements: Namakagon, Wisconsin
- ^{1} Shore length is not a well-defined measure.

Lake Namakagon (pronounced NAM-uh-KAH-gun) is located in Bayfield County, Wisconsin. The lake is a large freshwater drainage lake that opens inlet and outlet of streams located between Lake Superior and Mississippi River system. The lake is located in the upper Namekagon river watershed as St. Croix river basin is the subwatershed of it. The lake derives its name from the Ojibwe language, and it means "Lake abundant with sturgeons." It is known for tourism and was the home of the legendary Anishinaabe Chief Namakagon.

== Early history/Origins ==
The area around Lake Namakagon was logged heavily during the timber boom years from post-Civil War days through the mid-1920s. The Chicago, Minneapolis, St. Paul, Omaha and Northwestern Railroad arrived nearby in 1880, delivering timber and tourists. Area forests are temperate deciduous forest containing many varieties of coniferous trees, such as white spruce, and other vegetation.

From the early 1830s through 1886, a Native American made his home on the lake. Known locally as Chief Namakagon, he became legend as a result of Ashland Daily Press articles about his trading shards of silver for supplies. His secret source for the silver was never discovered and people still search for it today.

Logging has given way to tourism as the primary economic driver.

The Namakagon River sources from this lake.

== Physical Aspects ==
Lake Namakagon is a 2,897 acres (1,172 ha) lake located at 46 22’ 15” 70.00” N -91 06’ 36.00” W. The shoreline length of Lake Namakagon is 43.67 miles (70.28 km). Lake Namakagon reaches a maximum depth of 51 feet (16 m), and a mean depth of 16 feet (4.9 m). The Namakagon River sources the 52,032 acre-feet (64,181,000 m^{3}) lake. There is a dam located on the west side of the lake and was put in place by the town of Namakagon in 1926 to regulate the water level. The lake's geological basin origin is a glacial lake basin. Lake Namakagon hydrological lake type is drainage. The bottom composition of the lake is 30% sand, 25% gravel, 0% rock, 45% muck. The water clarity of Lake Namakagon is low.

== Living, Biological, and Wildlife ==
Lake Namakagon is home to a thriving fishery with the following species; muskellunge, bluegill and other sunfish, largemouth and smallmouth bass, crappie, northern pike, and walleye. Lake Namakagon's trophic status is a eutrophic lake.

== Recreation ==
Namakagon lake offers several activities open to the public including camping, hiking and biking on the trails, kayaking, water activities, basketball courts, fishing, and wildlife watching. Near the campground there are several trails of North Country National Scenic Trail, CAMBA Mountain Bike Trails, and Rock Lake National Recreation Trail. Across the campground there is a Namekagon trail about a mile long loop. Water activities include, jet skiing, swimming, boat riding, tubing, waterskiing, and windsurfing are all offered at the lake. Namakagon is known for their great fishery of different species of bluegill and other sunfish, largemouth and smallmouth bass, crappie, northern pike, and walleye. Namakagon is a premier muskellunge lake, and "one of only three lakes in Wisconsin managed as a trophy muskie lake."

== Tourist Attractions ==
There are several restaurants and resorts located on Lake Namakagon.

Most of the resorts overlook the lake and feature Northwoods-style cabins and lodging. Among them include:

- Lakewoods Resort & Lodge
- Mogasheen Resort
- Garmisch USA Resort
- Westwind Resort
- Four Seasons Resort
- Mortenson's Resort
- The Loon Saloon

== Environmental Concerns ==
There are environmental concerns throughout Namakagon Lake that need to be addressed:

- Invasive species: Invasive species have the ability to change the natural features of Namekagon Lake which can cause expensive control methods for invasive species. Nonindigenous species of hybrid Eurasian watermilfoil, Myriophyllum sibiricum (northern Eurasian watermilfoil), Lythrum salicaria (purple loosestrife), Cipangopaludina chinensis (chinese mystery snail), and Potamogeton crispus (curly leaf pondweed) are taking over the indigenous species by squeezing into openings at the bottom of the lake which cause the indigenous species to be eliminated from the lake. Myriophyllum spicatum ( Eurasian watermilfoil) is a invasive plant species that causes fragmentation and blocking the native species from getting the sunlight they need to grow. Lythrum salicaria (Purple loosestrife) replaces native wetland vegetation and breaking down wildlife habitats. Some of the ways to control and prevent nonindigenous species from taking over Namakagon lake is to help educate lake users, contacts to conform nonindigenous species identification, landing surveillance cameras, and coat decontamination.
- Herbicides: There are two kinds of herbicides of systemic and broad spectrum herbicides used at Namakagon lake. Herbicides can have an effect on wildlife resources, human health, and the environment. Army Corps of Engineers Aquatic Plant Information System (APIS) mentions that herbicides are able to control Eurasian watermilfoil invasive species but it can cause plants to be depressed by male tubercles, depressed by their egg cell maturation among females, and decreases the chances of larval surviving.
- Woody cover: Namakagon lake wants to help prevent woody cover of trees and stumps from being removed to allow for wildlife, fish, and other organisms to have a habitat to live in.
- Water quality: The water clarity in Namakagon lake has been low. Most of the water quality is being collected by volunteers working for Namakagon lake. The volunteers use black and white quadrant secchi disk (about eight inches) method to collect samples within Namakagon lake to measure the transparency throughout the season/year to year of water clarity. Secchi disk calculates the depth when the disk is lowered down into the water until it can not be seen. The greater the secchi depth is, the greater the water clarity is. transparency can have an effect on sediment, water, and algae. The trophic state index is between mesotrophic and eutrophic that can show low to no oxygen present and the secchi disks can result in decreased readings.
- Erosion: Controlling erosion measures in Namakagon lake by having the proper construction activities clear of fish spawning in their habitat and preserve gravel and rubble near the shoreline. Helping restore vegetation buffers will allow for erosion to be protected and silt runoff from occurring along the shoreline.
- Management practices: Namakagon lake's watershed needs to have a strong management practice to assist in reducing debris, silts, and nutrients from entering the lake system. The management is run by the Wisconsins's Forestry Best Management Practice for Water Quality, WDNR.

== Photo Gallery ==
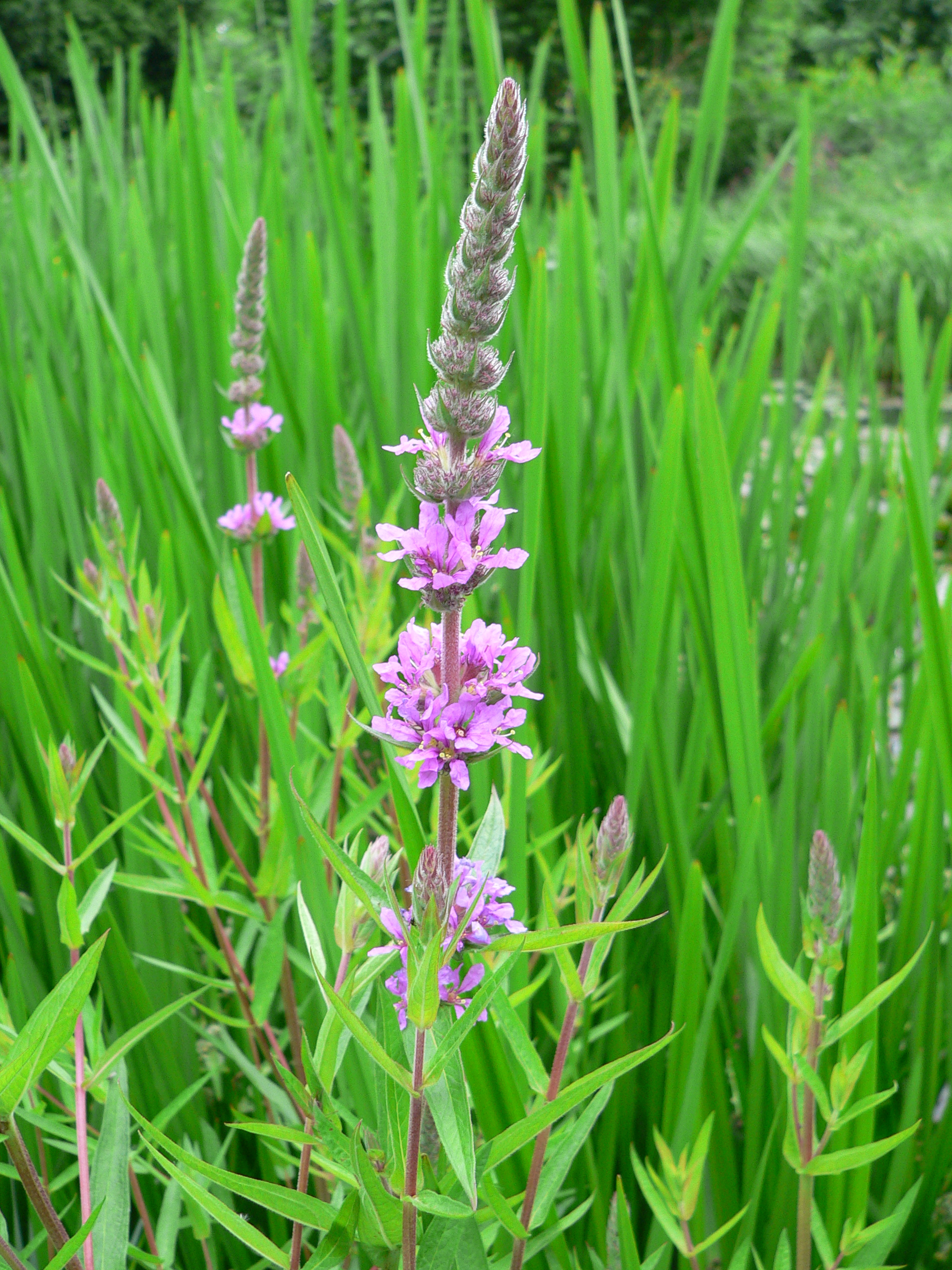
Lythrum salicaria (Purple loosestrife)

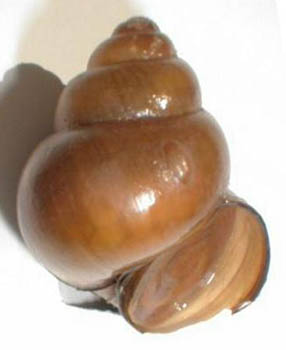
Cipangopaludina chinensis (Chinese mystery snail)

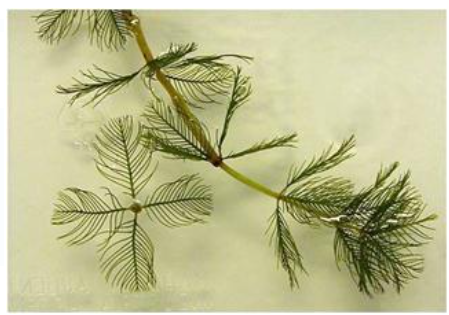
Myriophyllum spicatum (Eurasian watermilfoil)

== Sources ==
- "Lake Namakagon Aquatic Plant Management Plan" (PDF). WDNR. Namakagon Lake Association.
- "USDA (United States Department of Agriculture)". www.fs.usda.gov.
- "Namekagon lake, Bayfield County- Critical Habitat Designation". WDNR.
- "Namakagon Lake Chequamegon-Nicolet National Forest" (PDF). USDA. Archived from the original (PDF) on 12 February 2017.
- "Namakagon Lake Recreation Area". United States Department of Agriculture(USDA) Forest Service.
- Namakagon Lake Aquatic Plant Management Plan (PDF). Aquatic Plant Advisory Committee. May 2018. pp. 1–90.
- "Namekagon Lake". Wisconsin Department of Natural Resources.
- USDA Forest Service. "Namekagon Lake Recreation Area".
- Markham, Demorest, Center for Land use Education, and UW-Extension. Protecting Your Waterfront Investment. pp. 1–11.
