= Benoit, Wisconsin =

- unincorporated community
- Location within Wisconsin Location within the United States
- Coordinates: 46°30′07″N 91°04′37″W
- Country: United States
- State: Wisconsin
- County: Bayfield
- Towns: Keystone, Mason
- Elevation: 902 ft (275 m)
- Time zone: UTC-6 (Central (CST))
  - Summer (DST): UTC-5 (CDT)
- ZIP code: 54816
- Area codes: 715 and 534
- GNIS feature ID: 1578756

Benoit is an unincorporated community in the towns of Keystone and Mason, Bayfield County, Wisconsin, United States. It is along County Highway F and located 13 miles southwest of the city of Ashland. Nearby is the junction of U.S. Highways 2 and 63.

== History ==
The community was named for Antoine Benoit, a pioneer French settler. Other names before Benoit included Thirty Miles Siding, Peckville, Peck and Benoitville.
