= Topside, Wisconsin =

- Unincorporated community
- Location within Wisconsin Location within the United States
- Coordinates: 46°33′33″N 91°19′22″W
- Country: United States
- State: Wisconsin
- County: Bayfield
- Town: Iron River
- Elevation: 1,158 ft (353 m)
- Time zone: UTC-6 (Central (CST))
  - Summer (DST): UTC-5 (CDT)
- Area codes: 715 and 534
- GNIS feature ID: 1580621

Topside is an unincorporated community in the town of Iron River, Bayfield County, Wisconsin, United States. Topside is located near U.S. Route 2, 4.1 miles (6.6 km) east of the community of Iron River.
