= John C. Sibbald =

American politician and businessman

John C. Sibbald (August 9, 1903 – January 12, 1956) was an American politician and businessman.

Born in Ashland, Wisconsin, Sibbald grew up in the town of Grandview, Wisconsin where he owned a general store. The town of Grandview was called the town of Pratt until the name of the town was changed to Grandview in 1969. Sibbald was the town clerk, town chairman of the town of Pratt, and served on the Bayfield County, Wisconsin Board of Supervisors. In 1935, Sibbald served in the Wisconsin State Assembly on the Progressive ticket, but lost the nomination in 1936 to Laurie E. Carlson. In 1937, Sibbald served as secretary to the speaker of the Wisconsin Assembly. He worked for the Wisconsin State Beverage Tax Division, the United States Office of Price Administration, and finally the Wisconsin Department of Internal Revenue. He was working in Wausau, Wisconsin for the Wisconsin Internal Revenue Department at the time of his death in Wausau, Wisconsin.
