= Mason (town), Wisconsin =

Town in Bayfield County, Wisconsin

Mason
- Town
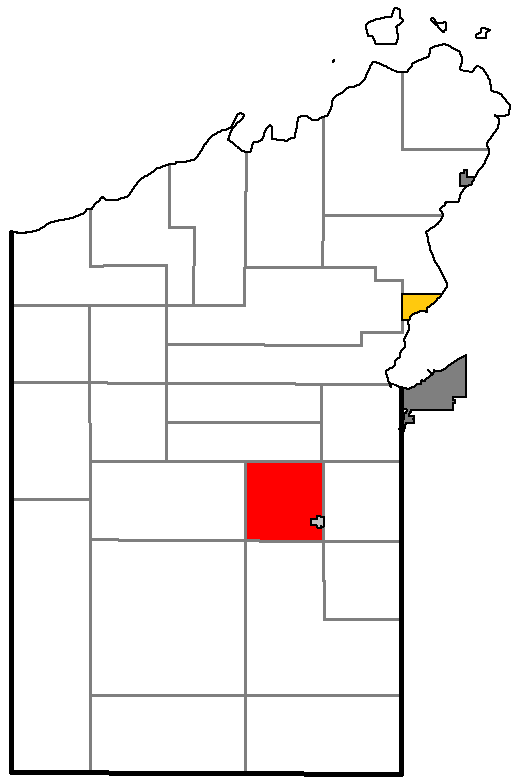
- Location in Bayfield County, Wisconsin
- Coordinates: 46.4358°N 91.0633°W
- Country: United States
- State: Wisconsin
- County: Bayfield

Area
  - Total: 35.7 sq mi (92.5 km^{2})
  - Land: 35.7 sq mi (92.5 km^{2})
  - Water: 0 sq mi (0.0 km^{2})

Population (2020)
  - Total: 289
  - Density: 8.0/sq mi (3.1/km^{2})
- Time zone: UTC-6 (CST)
  - Summer (DST): UTC-5 (CDT)
- ZIP Code: 54856
- Area code: 715

Mason is a town in Bayfield County, Wisconsin, United States. The population was 289 at the 2020 census, down from 315 at the 2010 census. The Village of Mason is located within the town. The unincorporated community of Sutherland is located partially in the town.

== Transportation ==
U.S. Highway 63 serves as a main route in the community.

== Geography ==
According to the United States Census Bureau, the town has a total area of 35.7 square miles (92.5 km^{2}), all land.

Mason is located 17 miles (27 km) southwest of the city of Ashland and 41 miles (66 km) northeast of the city of Hayward.

== Demographics ==
As of the census of 2000, there were 326 people, 112 households, and 86 families residing in the town. The population density was 9.1 people per square mile (3.5/km^{2}). There were 151 housing units at an average density of 4.2 per square mile (1.6/km^{2}). The racial makeup of the town was 97.24% White, 0.61% Black or African American, 0.31% Native American, 1.53% from other races, and 0.31% from two or more races. Hispanic or Latino of any race were 1.53% of the population.

There were 112 households, out of which 38.4% had children under the age of 18 living with them, 63.4% were married couples living together, 3.6% had a female householder with no husband present, and 23.2% were non-families. 18.8% of all households were made up of individuals, and 10.7% had someone living alone who was 65 years of age or older. The average household size was 2.91 and the average family size was 3.38.

In the town, the population was spread out, with 31.3% under the age of 18, 6.1% from 18 to 24, 26.4% from 25 to 44, 23.6% from 45 to 64, and 12.6% who were 65 years of age or older. The median age was 38 years. For every 100 females, there were 115.9 males. For every 100 females age 18 and over, there were 109.3 males.

The median income for a household in the town was $34,231, and the median income for a family was $44,792. Males had a median income of $30,833 versus $18,542 for females. The per capita income for the town was $13,814. About 6.9% of families and 9.9% of the population were below the poverty line, including 13.9% of those under age 18 and 17.4% of those age 65 or over.
