= Hughes, Wisconsin =

- Town
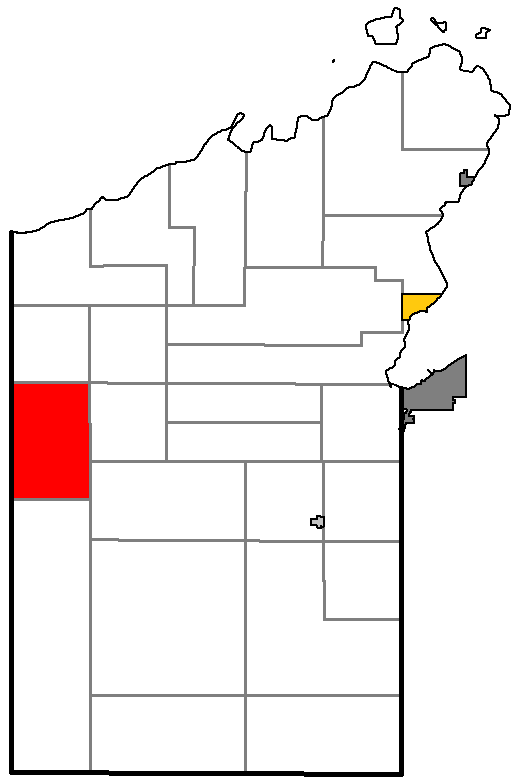
- Location of Hughes, within Bayfield County
- Coordinates: 46°32′21″N 91°29′21″W
- Country: United States
- State: Wisconsin
- County: Bayfield

Area
  - Total: 53.4 sq mi (138.4 km^{2})
  - Land: 52.2 sq mi (135.2 km^{2})
  - Water: 1.3 sq mi (3.3 km^{2})
- Elevation: 1,194 ft (364 m)

Population (2020)
  - Total: 471
  - Density: 9.02/sq mi (3.48/km^{2})
- Time zone: UTC-6 (Central (CST))
  - Summer (DST): UTC-5 (CDT)
- Area codes: 715 & 534
- FIPS code: 55-36300
- GNIS feature ID: 1583419

Hughes is a town in Bayfield County, Wisconsin, United States. The population was 471 at the 2020 census, up from 383 at the 2010 census. The unincorporated communities of Muskeg and Wills are located in the town.

== Geography ==
According to the United States Census Bureau, the town has a total area of 53.4 square miles (138.4 km^{2}), of which 52.2 square miles (135.2 km^{2}) is land and 1.3 square miles (3.3 km^{2}), or 2.37%, is water.

== Demographics ==
As of the census of 2000, there were 408 people, 166 households, and 123 families residing in the town. The population density was 7.8 people per square mile (3.0/km^{2}). There were 343 housing units at an average density of 6.6 per square mile (2.5/km^{2}). The racial makeup of the town was 97.30% White, 0.25% Native American, 0.74% Asian, 0.74% from other races, and 0.98% from two or more races.

There were 166 households, out of which 27.7% had children under the age of 18 living with them, 68.1% were married couples living together, 3.6% had a female householder with no husband present, and 25.9% were non-families. 19.9% of all households were made up of individuals, and 9.0% had someone living alone who was 65 years of age or older. The average household size was 2.46 and the average family size was 2.84.

In the town, the population was spread out, with 23.5% under the age of 18, 4.9% from 18 to 24, 25.7% from 25 to 44, 29.4% from 45 to 64, and 16.4% who were 65 years of age or older. The median age was 42 years. For every 100 females, there were 109.2 males. For every 100 females age 18 and over, there were 110.8 males.

The median income for a household in the town was $37,125, and the median income for a family was $45,938. Males had a median income of $31,429 versus $25,000 for females. The per capita income for the town was $17,373. About 1.7% of families and 3.1% of the population were below the poverty line, including none of those under age 18 and 12.7% of those age 65 or over.
