= Lincoln, Bayfield County, Wisconsin =

Lincoln, Wisconsin
- Town
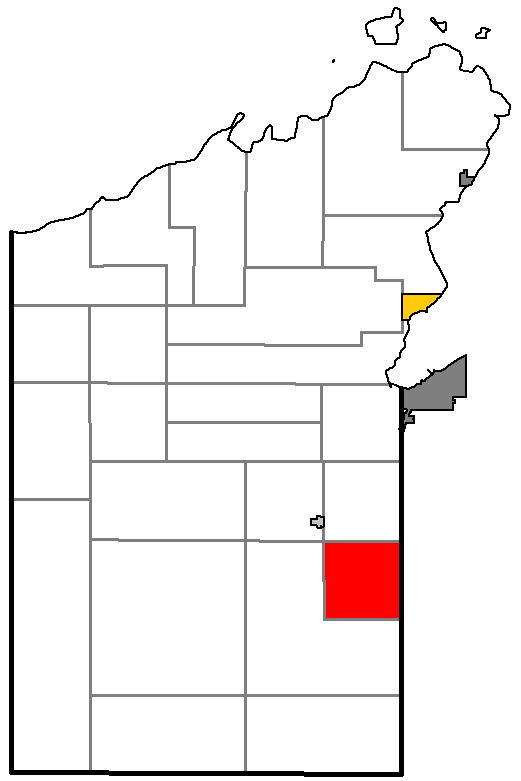
- Location of Lincoln, within Bayfield County
- Coordinates: 46°21′12″N 90°58′55″W
- Country: United States
- State: Wisconsin
- County: Bayfield

Area
  - Total: 35.9 sq mi (92.9 km^{2})
  - Land: 35.5 sq mi (92.0 km^{2})
  - Water: 0.35 sq mi (0.9 km^{2})
- Elevation: 1,079 ft (329 m)

Population (2020)
  - Total: 251
  - Density: 7.07/sq mi (2.73/km^{2})
- Time zone: UTC-6 (Central (CST))
  - Summer (DST): UTC-5 (CDT)
- Area codes: 715 & 534
- FIPS code: 55-44275
- GNIS feature ID: 1583561

Lincoln is a town in Bayfield County, Wisconsin, United States. The population was 251 at the 2020 census, down from 287 at the 2010 census.

== Geography ==
According to the United States Census Bureau, the town has a total area of 35.9 square miles (92.9 km^{2}), of which 35.5 square miles (92.0 km^{2}) is land and 0.35 square miles (0.9 km^{2}), or 0.93%, is water.

== Demographics ==
As of the census of 2000, there were 293 people, 118 households, and 80 families residing in the town. The population density was 8.3 people per square mile (3.2/km^{2}). There were 191 housing units at an average density of 5.4 per square mile (2.1/km^{2}). The racial makeup of the town was 96.59% White, 2.39% African American, 0.34% Asian, and 0.68% from two or more races. Hispanic or Latino of any race were 0.34% of the population.

There were 118 households, out of which 25.4% had children under the age of 18 living with them, 60.2% were married couples living together, 2.5% had a female householder with no husband present, and 32.2% were non-families. 26.3% of all households were made up of individuals, and 13.6% had someone living alone who was 65 years of age or older. The average household size was 2.48 and the average family size was 3.03.

In the town, the population was spread out, with 22.9% under the age of 18, 6.1% from 18 to 24, 24.2% from 25 to 44, 30.4% from 45 to 64, and 16.4% who were 65 years of age or older. The median age was 42 years. For every 100 females, there were 106.3 males. For every 100 females age 18 and over, there were 105.5 males.

The median income for a household in the town was $27,917, and the median income for a family was $31,250. Males had a median income of $23,750 versus $18,250 for females. The per capita income for the town was $13,530. About 5.7% of families and 6.8% of the population were below the poverty line, including 10.4% of those under the age of eighteen and 5.8% of those 65 or over.
