= Clover, Wisconsin =

- Town
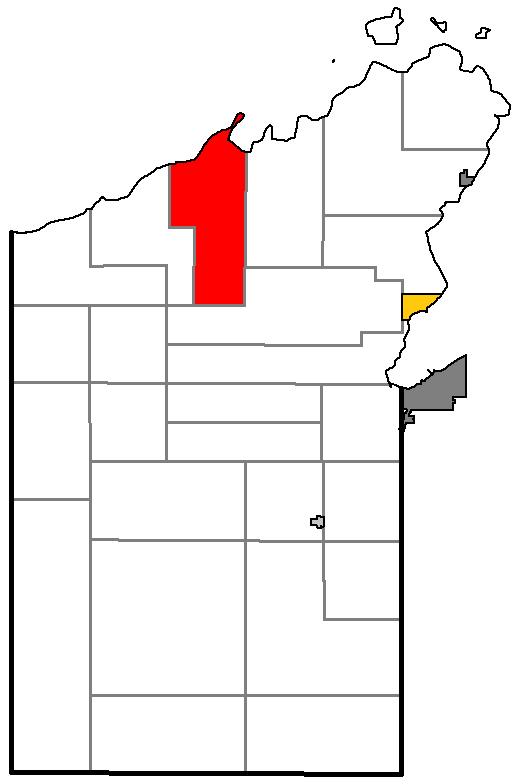
- Location of Clover, within Bayfield County
- Coordinates: 46°47′8″N 91°14′17″W
- Country: United States
- State: Wisconsin
- County: Bayfield

Area
  - Total: 59.9 sq mi (155.1 km^{2})
  - Land: 59.6 sq mi (154.3 km^{2})
  - Water: 0.31 sq mi (0.8 km^{2})
- Elevation: 850 ft (260 m)

Population (2020)
  - Total: 261
  - Density: 4.38/sq mi (1.69/km^{2})
- Time zone: UTC-6 (Central (CST))
  - Summer (DST): UTC-5 (CDT)
- Area codes: 715 & 534
- FIPS code: 55-15750
- GNIS feature ID: 1582987

Clover is a town in Bayfield County, Wisconsin, United States. The population was 261 at the 2020 census, up from 223 at the 2010 census. The unincorporated communities of Bark Point and Herbster are located in the town.

== Transportation ==
Wisconsin Highway 13 and Lenawee Road / Forest Road 262 are the main routes in the community.

== Geography ==
According to the United States Census Bureau, 59.9 square miles (155.1 km^{2}), of which 59.6 square miles (154.3 km^{2}) is land and 0.31 square miles (0.8 km^{2}), or 0.51%, is water.

== Demographics ==
As of the census of 2000, there were 211 people, 99 households, and 63 families residing in the town. The population density was 3.5 people per square mile (1.4/km^{2}). There were 364 housing units at an average density of 6.1 per square mile (2.4/km^{2}). The racial makeup of the town was 97.16% White, 0.95% Native American, and 1.90% from two or more races. Hispanic or Latino of any race were 1.42% of the population.

There were 99 households, out of which 20.2% had children under the age of 18 living with them, 53.5% were married couples living together, 4.0% had a female householder with no husband present, and 35.4% were non-families. 28.3% of all households were made up of individuals, and 8.1% had someone living alone who was 65 years of age or older. The average household size was 2.13 and the average family size was 2.58.

In the town, the population was spread out, with 19.0% under the age of 18, 1.4% from 18 to 24, 24.6% from 25 to 44, 32.7% from 45 to 64, and 22.3% who were 65 years of age or older. The median age was 48 years. For every 100 females, there were 108.9 males. For every 100 females age 18 and over, there were 103.6 males.

The median income for a household in the town was $27,875, and the median income for a family was $31,250. Males had a median income of $28,750 versus $15,000 for females. The per capita income for the town was $15,355. About 9.3% of families and 13.6% of the population were below the poverty line, including 20.0% of those under the age of eighteen and 7.0% of those 65 or over.
