= Orienta, Wisconsin =

- Town
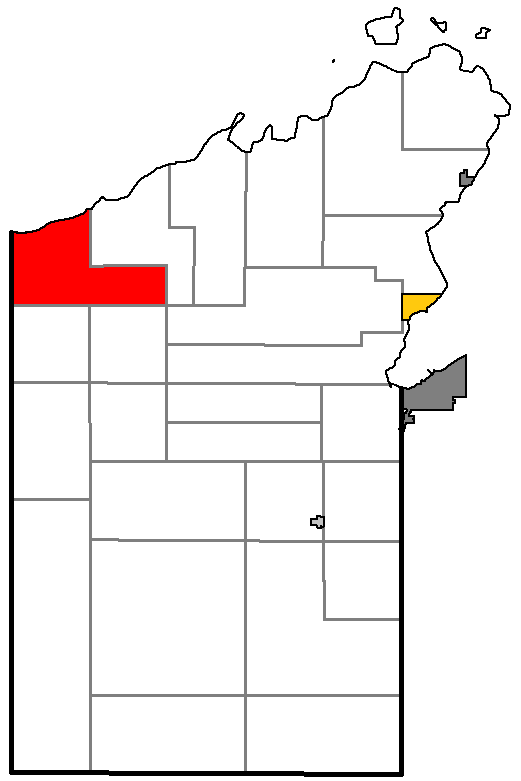
- Location of Orienta, within Bayfield County
- Coordinates: 46°43′59″N 91°27′49″W
- Country: United States
- State: Wisconsin
- County: Bayfield

Area
  - Total: 54.2 sq mi (140.5 km^{2})
  - Land: 54.1 sq mi (140.1 km^{2})
  - Water: 0.19 sq mi (0.5 km^{2})
- Elevation: 833 ft (254 m)

Population (2020)
  - Total: 164
  - Density: 3.03/sq mi (1.17/km^{2})
- Time zone: UTC-6 (Central (CST))
  - Summer (DST): UTC-5 (CDT)
- Area codes: 715 & 534
- FIPS code: 55-60275
- GNIS feature ID: 1583870
- Website: https://townoforienta.com/

Orienta is a town in Bayfield County, Wisconsin, United States. The population was 164 at the 2020 census, up from 122 at the 2010 census.

== Geography ==
According to the United States Census Bureau, the town has a total area of 54.2 square miles (140.5 km^{2}), of which 54.1 square miles (140.1 km^{2}) is land and 0.19 square miles (0.5 km^{2}), or 0.35%, is water.

== Demographics ==
At the 2000 census there were 101 people, 52 households, and 24 families in the town. The population density was 1.9 people per square mile (0.7/km^{2}). There were 201 housing units at an average density of 3.7 per square mile (1.4/km^{2}). The racial makeup of the town was 95.05% White, 3.96% from other races, and 0.99% from two or more races. Hispanic or Latino of any race were 4.95%.

Of the 52 households 11.5% had children under the age of 18 living with them, 42.3% were married couples living together, 3.8% had a female householder with no husband present, and 53.8% were non-families. 42.3% of households were one person and 11.5% were one person aged 65 or older. The average household size was 1.94 and the average family size was 2.75.

The age distribution was 14.9% under the age of 18, 3.0% from 18 to 24, 28.7% from 25 to 44, 37.6% from 45 to 64, and 15.8% 65 or older. The median age was 47 years. For every 100 females, there were 110.4 males. For every 100 females age 18 and over, there were 120.5 males.

The median household income was $33,333 and the median family income was $46,250. Males had a median income of $31,250 versus $26,250 for females. The per capita income for the town was $19,775. There were no families and 6.8% of the population living below the poverty line, including no under eighteens and none of those over 64.
