= Grand View, Wisconsin =

Census-designated place in Wisconsin, United States

- Census-designated place
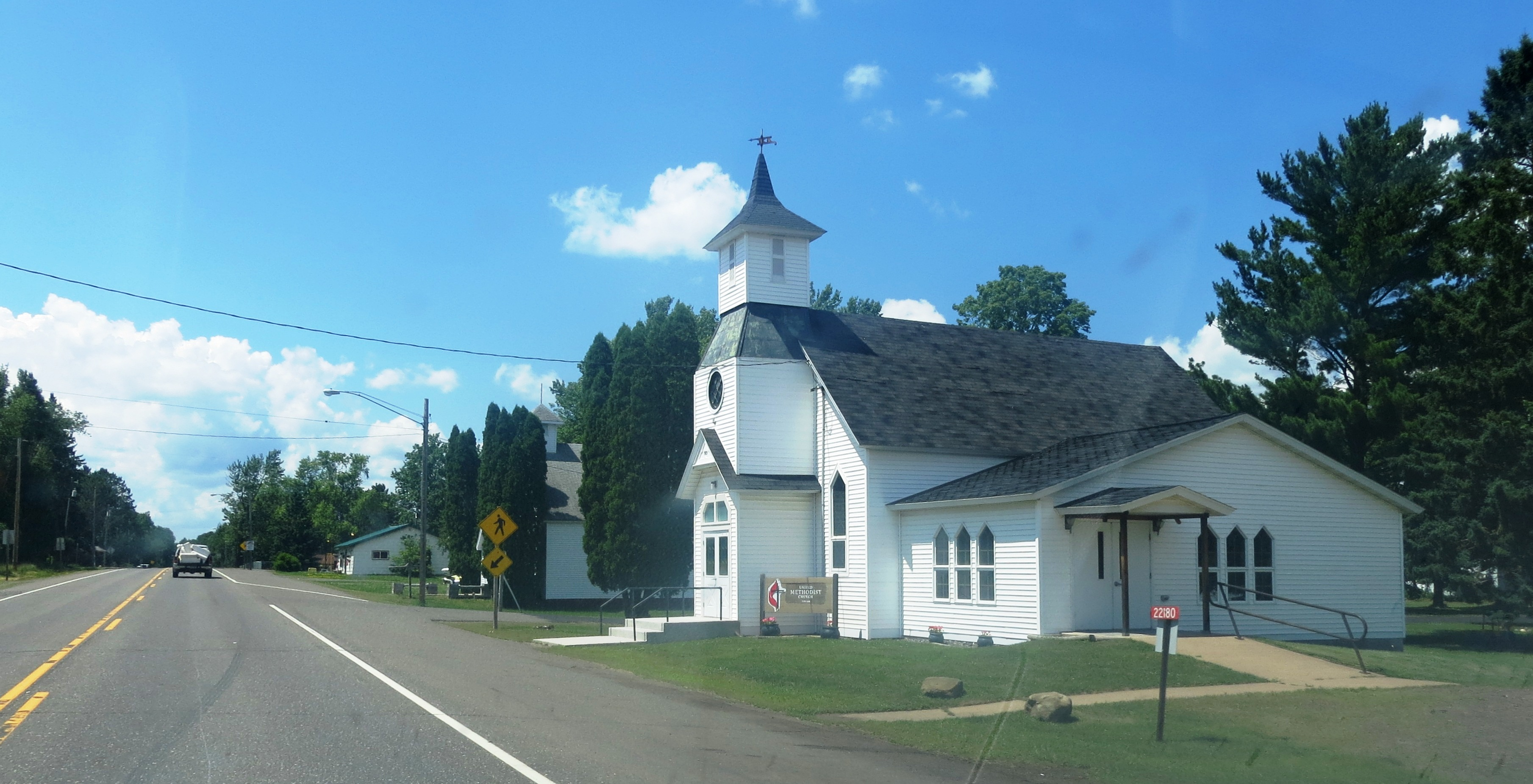
- Photo:Erlend Bjørtvedt

- Location within Wisconsin
- Coordinates: 46°22′03″N 91°06′30″W
- Country: United States
- State: Wisconsin
- County: Bayfield
- Town: Grandview

Area
  - Total: 0.740 sq mi (1.92 km^{2})
  - Land: 0.740 sq mi (1.92 km^{2})
  - Water: 0 sq mi (0 km^{2})
- Elevation: 1,050 ft (320 m)

Population (2020)
  - Total: 117
  - Density: 158/sq mi (61.0/km^{2})
- Time zone: UTC-6 (Central (CST))
  - Summer (DST): UTC-5 (CDT)
- ZIP code: 54839
- Area codes: 715 and 534
- GNIS feature ID: 1579348

Grand View (also Grandview, Pratt) is an unincorporated, census-designated place located in the town of Grandview, Bayfield County, Wisconsin, United States.

U.S. Highway 63 serves as a main route in the community. Grand View is located 23 miles southwest of the city of Ashland; and 34 miles northeast of the city of Hayward.

Grand View has a post office with ZIP code 54839. As of the 2020 census, its population is 117, down from 163 at the 2010 census.

== History ==
A post office was established as Grandview in 1900; the spelling was changed to Grand View in 1970. The community was named from the scenery.

== Notable people ==
- Vic C. Wallin, Wisconsin State Representative and businessman, lived in Grand View.
