= Moquah, Wisconsin =

- Unincorporated community
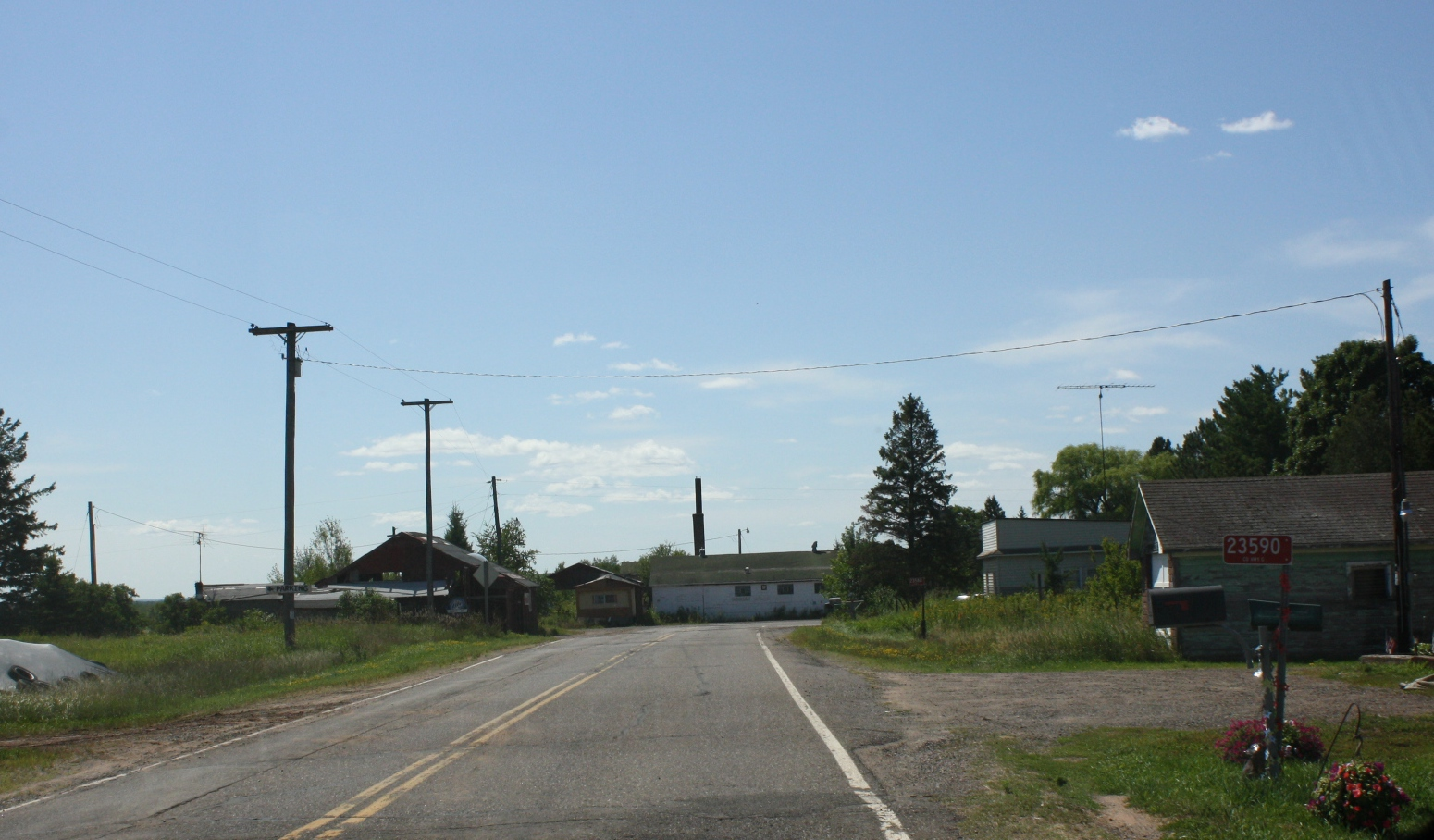
- Downtown Moquah

- Location within Wisconsin Location within the United States
- Coordinates: 46°34′14″N 91°05′00″W
- Country: United States
- State: Wisconsin
- County: Bayfield
- Town: Pilsen
- Elevation: 850 ft (260 m)
- Time zone: UTC-6 (Central (CST))
  - Summer (DST): UTC-5 (CDT)
- Area codes: 715 and 534
- GNIS feature ID: 1579912

Moquah is an unincorporated community in the town of Pilsen, Bayfield County, Wisconsin, United States, located along County Highway G. Moquah is 10 miles (16 km) west of the city of Ashland. The community's name is derived from the Algonquian word for "bear".

== Images ==
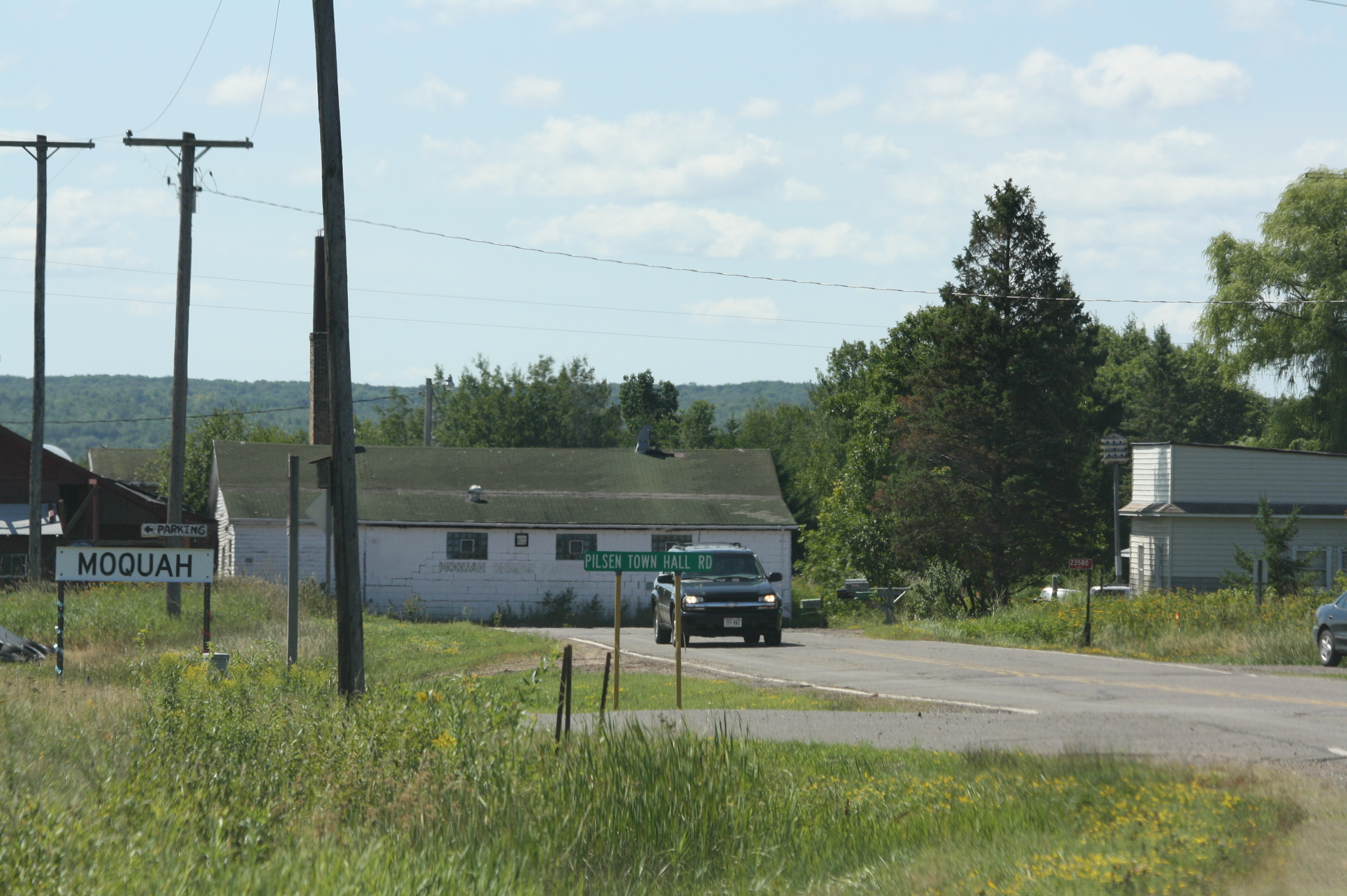
Moquah sign

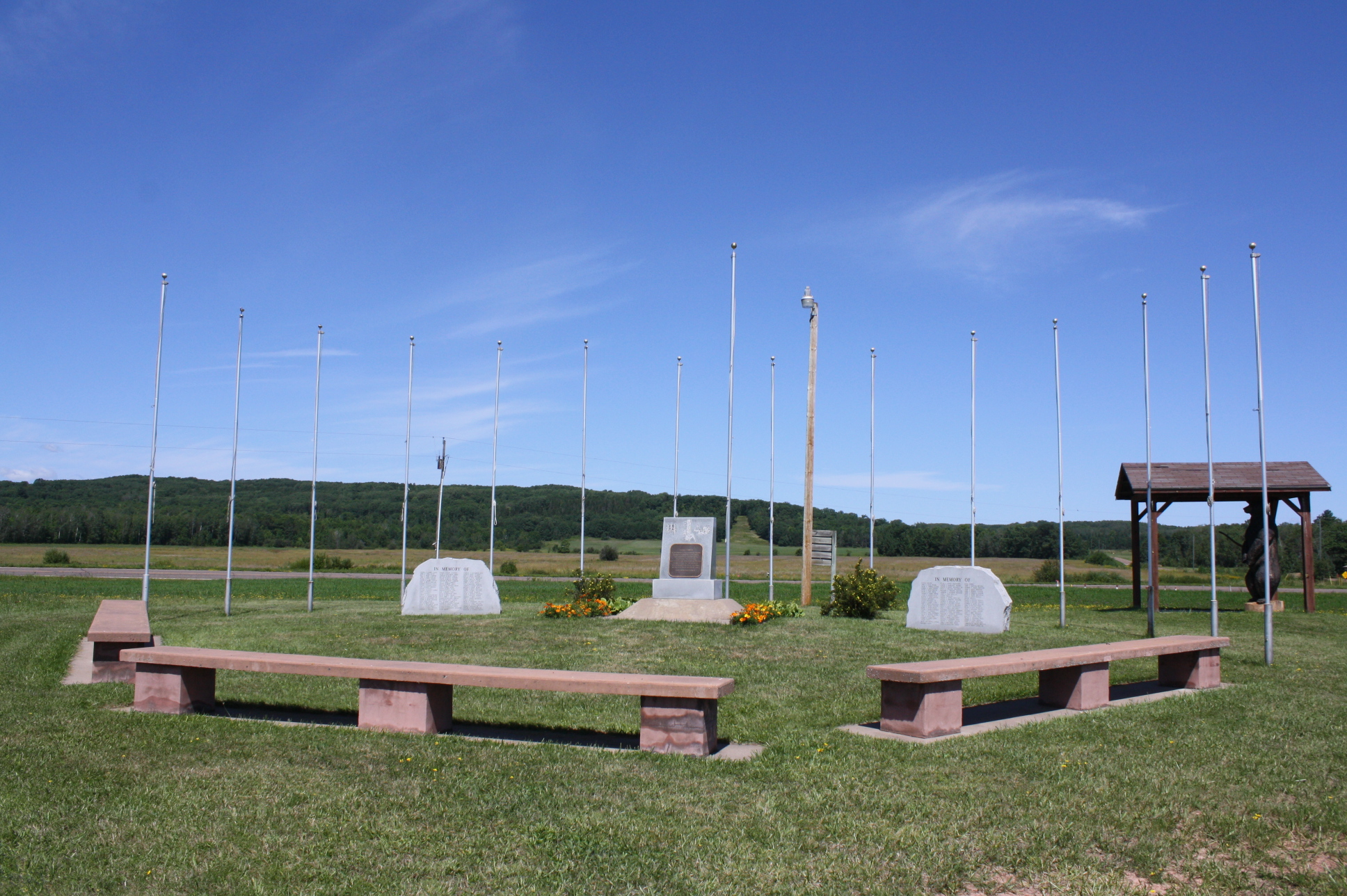
Pioneers Park

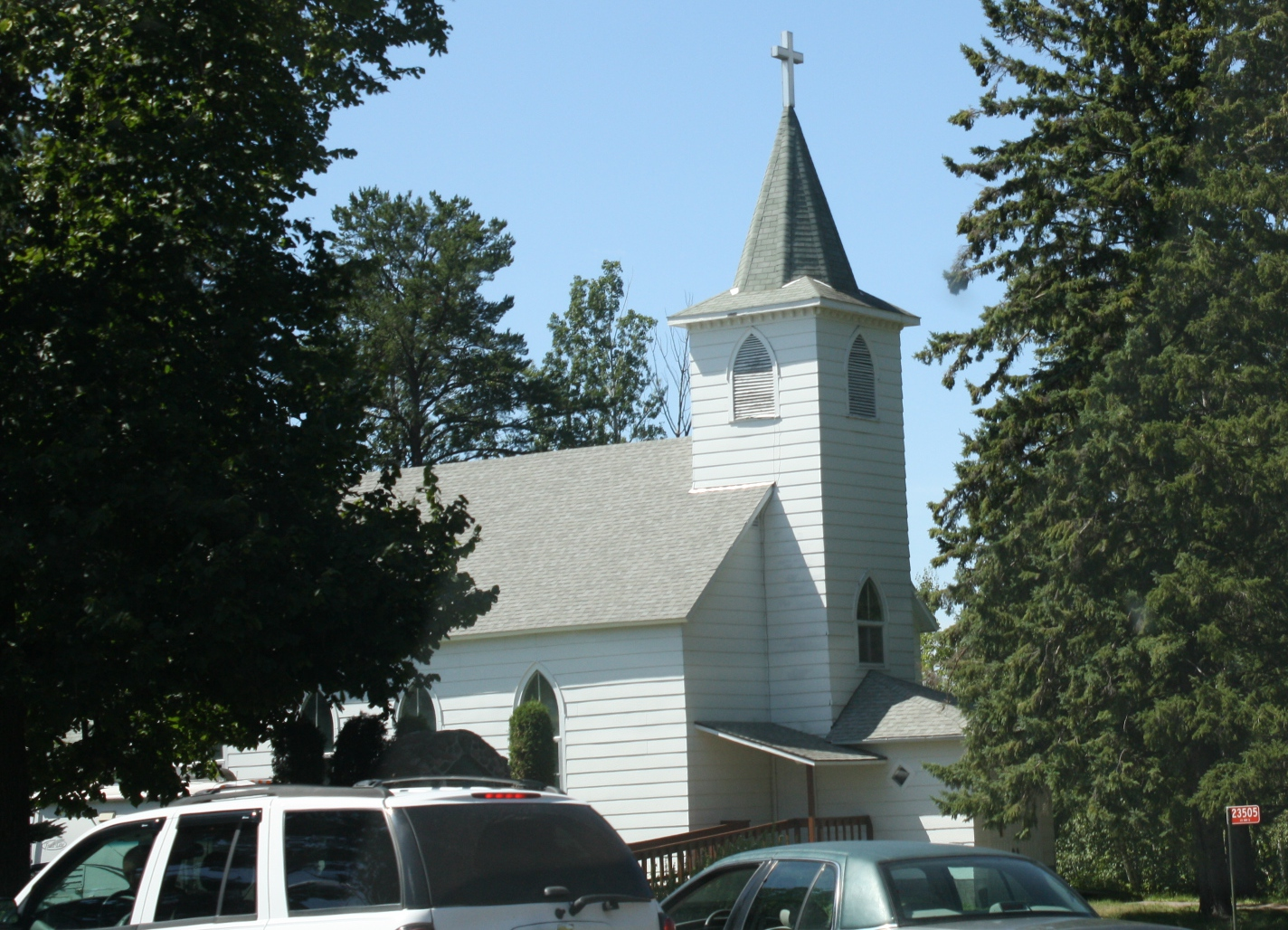
Ss Peter and Paul Catholic Church
