= Bayview, Wisconsin =

- Town
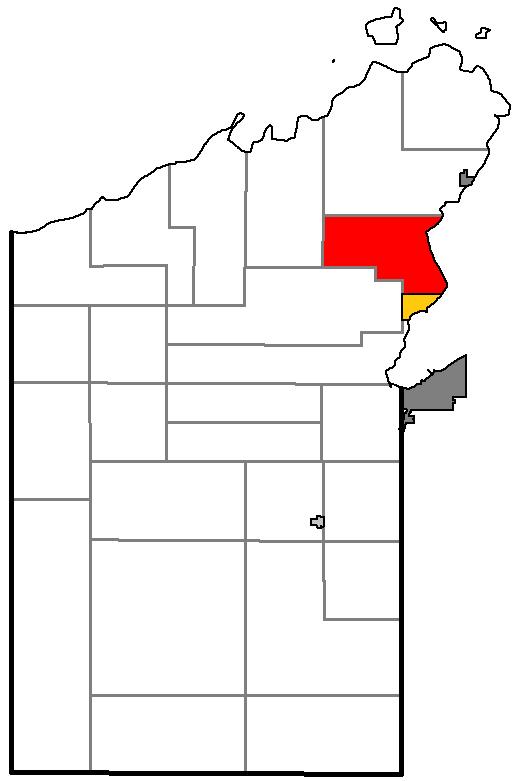
- Location of Bayview, within Bayfield County
- Coordinates: 46°44′51″N 90°57′36″W
- Country: United States
- State: Wisconsin
- County: Bayfield

Area
  - Total: 56.1 sq mi (145.3 km^{2})
  - Land: 41.5 sq mi (107.4 km^{2})
  - Water: 14.6 sq mi (37.9 km^{2})
- Elevation: 840 ft (256 m)

Population (2020)
  - Total: 512
  - Density: 12.3/sq mi (4.77/km^{2})
- Time zone: UTC-6 (Central (CST))
  - Summer (DST): UTC-5 (CDT)
- Area codes: 715 & 534
- FIPS code: 55-05475
- GNIS feature ID: 1582767
- Website: townofbayviewwi.gov

Bayview is a town in Bayfield County, Wisconsin, United States. The population was 512 at the 2020 census, up from 487 at the 2010 census. The unincorporated community of Sioux is located in the town.

== Geography ==
According to the United States Census Bureau, the town has a total area of 56.1 square miles (145.3 km^{2}), of which 41.5 square miles (107.4 km^{2}) is land and 14.6 square miles (37.9 km^{2}), or 26.08%, is water.

== Demographics ==
As of the census of 2000, there were 491 people, 197 households, and 143 families residing in the town. The population density was 11.8 people per square mile (4.6/km^{2}). There were 283 housing units at an average density of 6.8 per square mile (2.6/km^{2}). The racial makeup of the town was 94.09% White, 3.67% Native American, 0.20% Pacific Islander, 0.41% from other races, and 1.63% from two or more races. Hispanic or Latino of any race were 0.20% of the population.

There were 197 households, out of which 27.9% had children under the age of 18 living with them, 67.0% were married couples living together, 2.0% had a female householder with no husband present, and 27.4% were non-families. 21.8% of all households were made up of individuals, and 7.1% had someone living alone who was 65 years of age or older. The average household size was 2.49 and the average family size was 2.92.

In the town, the population was spread out, with 24.0% under the age of 18, 4.1% from 18 to 24, 23.8% from 25 to 44, 31.6% from 45 to 64, and 16.5% who were 65 years of age or older. The median age was 44 years. For every 100 females, there were 108.1 males. For every 100 females age 18 and over, there were 108.4 males.

The median income for a household in the town was $46,500, and the median income for a family was $54,167. Males had a median income of $41,875 versus $28,750 for females. The per capita income for the town was $24,083. About 4.9% of families and 7.6% of the population were below the poverty line, including 8.1% of those under age 18 and 11.2% of those age 65 or over.
