= Barnes, Wisconsin =

- Town
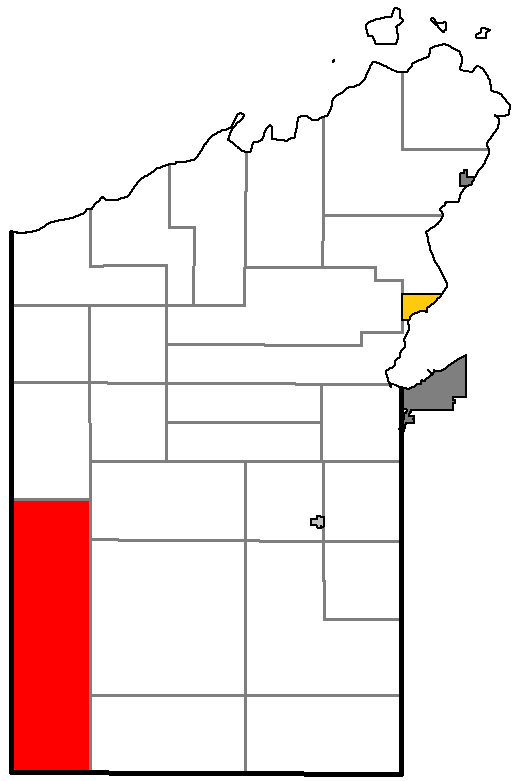
- Location of Barnes, within Bayfield County
- Coordinates: 46°20′1″N 91°30′24″W
- Country: United States
- State: Wisconsin
- County: Bayfield

Area
  - Total: 124.2 sq mi (321.8 km^{2})
  - Land: 117.8 sq mi (305.0 km^{2})
  - Water: 6.5 sq mi (16.9 km^{2})
- Elevation: 1,188 ft (362 m)

Population (2020)
  - Total: 823
  - Density: 6.99/sq mi (2.70/km^{2})
- Time zone: UTC-6 (Central (CST))
  - Summer (DST): UTC-5 (CDT)
- Area codes: 715 & 534
- FIPS code: 55-04750
- GNIS feature ID: 1582752
- Website: townofbarneswi.gov

Barnes is a town in Bayfield County, Wisconsin, United States. The population was 823 at the 2020 census, up from 769 at the 2010 census. The town was named for an early settler named George Sardis Barnes who opened the first hotel, saloon, and store north of the Eau Claire lakes in the late 1880s.

== Geography ==
According to the United States Census Bureau, the town has a total area of 124.2 square miles (321.8 km^{2}), of which 117.8 square miles (305.0 km^{2}) is land and 6.5 square miles (16.9 km^{2}), or 5.24%, is water. Barnes is along Wisconsin Highway 27 and Bayfield County Highway N.

Barnes occupies the southwestern corner of Bayfield County, with Douglas County to the west and Sawyer County to the south.

== Demographics ==
As of the census of 2000, there were 610 people, 278 households, and 202 families residing in the town. The population density was 5.2 people per square mile (2.0/km^{2}). There were 1,486 housing units at an average density of 12.6 per square mile (4.9/km^{2}). The racial makeup of the town was 98.52% White, 0.98% Native American, 0.16% from other races, and 0.33% from two or more races. Hispanic or Latino of any race were 0.16% of the population.

There were 278 households, out of which 19.1% had children under the age of 18 living with them, 62.9% were married couples living together, 5.8% had a female householder with no husband present, and 27.3% were non-families. 23.7% of all households were made up of individuals, and 11.2% had someone living alone who was 65 years of age or older. The average household size was 2.19 and the average family size was 2.52.

In the town, the population was spread out, with 17.0% under the age of 18, 3.1% from 18 to 24, 18.2% from 25 to 44, 35.2% from 45 to 64, and 26.4% who were 65 years of age or older. The median age was 53 years. For every 100 females, there were 106.1 males. For every 100 females age 18 and over, there were 107.4 males.

The median income for a household in the town was $28,250, and the median income for a family was $32,500. Males had a median income of $30,833 versus $20,000 for females. The per capita income for the town was $16,405. About 11.6% of families and 16.1% of the population were below the poverty line, including 20.8% of those under age 18 and 13.1% of those age 65 or over.
