= Cable Union Airport =

Airport in Wisconsin, United States

- IATA: none; ICAO: none; FAA LID: 3CU

Summary
- Airport type: Public
- Owner: Town of Cable
- Serves: Cable, Wisconsin
- Opened: March 1949
- Time zone: CST (UTC−06:00)
  - Summer (DST): CDT (UTC−05:00)
- Elevation AMSL: 1,360 ft (410 m)
- Coordinates: 46°11′42″N 091°14′54″W

Map
- Location of airport in Wisconsin 3CU (the United States)

Runways
Direction	Length		Surface
Direction	ft	m	Surface
17/35	3,709	1,131	Asphalt
8/26	2,194	669	Turf

Statistics
- Aircraft operations (2024): 5,510
- Based aircraft (2024): 7
- Source: Federal Aviation Administration

Cable Union Airport (FAA LID: 3CU) is a city owned public use airport located 2 miles (3 km) southeast of the central business district of Cable, Wisconsin, a town in Bayfield County, Wisconsin, United States. It is included in the Federal Aviation Administration (FAA) National Plan of Integrated Airport Systems for 2025–2029, in which it is categorized as a basic general aviation facility.

Although most airports in the United States use the same three-letter location identifier for the FAA and International Air Transport Association (IATA), this airport is assigned 3CU by the FAA but has no designation from the IATA.

== Facilities and aircraft ==
Cable Union Airport covers an area of 218 acres (88 ha) at an elevation of 1,360 feet (415 m) above mean sea level. It has two runways: 17/35 is 3,709 by 75 feet (1,131 x 23 m) with an asphalt surface and 8/26 is 2,194 by 150 feet (669 x 46 m) with a turf surface.

For the 12-month period ending June 20, 2024, the airport had 5,510 aircraft operations, an average of 15 per day: 90% general aviation, 10% air taxi and less than 1% military. In August 2024, there were 7 aircraft based at this airport: 5 single-engine and 2 multi-engine.

Runway 8/26 is closed annually from November 21 through May 1.

== See also ==
- List of airports in Wisconsin
