= Grandview, Wisconsin =

- Town
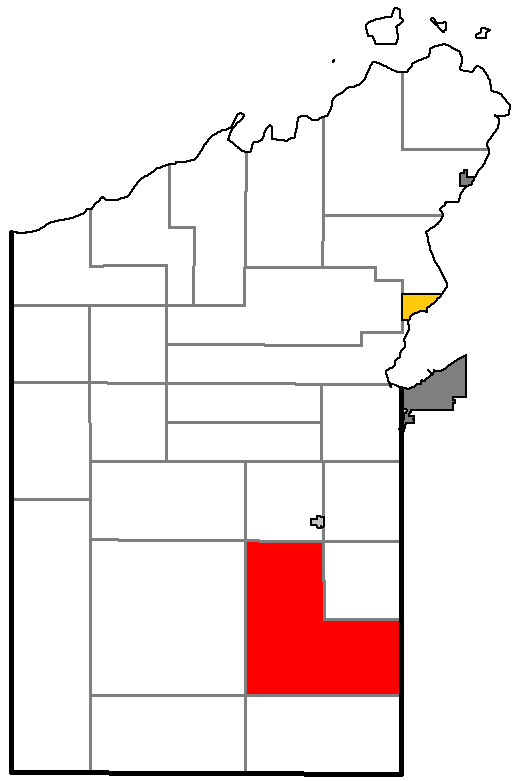
- Location of Grandview, within Bayfield County
- Coordinates: 46°17′58″N 91°3′53″W
- Country: United States
- State: Wisconsin
- County: Bayfield

Area
  - Total: 107.1 sq mi (277.5 km^{2})
  - Land: 104.4 sq mi (270.5 km^{2})
  - Water: 2.7 sq mi (7.0 km^{2})
- Elevation: 1,407 ft (429 m)

Population (2020)
  - Total: 508
  - Density: 4.86/sq mi (1.88/km^{2})
- Time zone: UTC-6 (Central (CST))
  - Summer (DST): UTC-5 (CDT)
- ZIP code: 54839
- Area codes: 715 & 534 715 and 534
- FIPS code: 55-30175
- GNIS feature ID: 1583297
- Website: https://townofgrandview.org/

Grandview is a town in Bayfield County, Wisconsin, United States. The population was 508 at the 2020 census, up from 468 at the 2010 census. The unincorporated community of Grand View is located in the town of Grandview.

U.S. Highway 63 serves as a main route in the community.

== History ==
In 1898, the town of Pratt was created; in 1969, the name was changed to the town of Grandview.

== Geography ==
According to the United States Census Bureau, the town has a total area of 107.1 square miles (277.5 km^{2}), of which 104.4 square miles (270.5 km^{2}) is land and 2.7 square miles (7.0 km^{2}), or 2.52%, is water.

== Demographics ==
As of the census of 2000, there were 483 people, 222 households, and 144 families residing in the town. The population density was 4.6 people per square mile (1.8/km^{2}). There were 529 housing units at an average density of 5.1 per square mile (2.0/km^{2}). The racial makeup of the town was 96.27% White, 2.07% Native American, 0.83% Asian, and 0.83% from two or more races. Hispanic or Latino of any race were 0.21% of the population.

There were 222 households, out of which 25.2% had children under the age of 18 living with them, 53.6% were married couples living together, 6.8% had a female householder with no husband present, and 35.1% were non-families. 29.3% of all households were made up of individuals, and 13.5% had someone living alone who was 65 years of age or older. The average household size was 2.18 and the average family size was 2.66.

In the town, the population was spread out, with 19.5% under the age of 18, 5.2% from 18 to 24, 22.6% from 25 to 44, 30.6% from 45 to 64, and 22.2% who were 65 years of age or older. The median age was 46 years. For every 100 females, there were 107.3 males. For every 100 females age 18 and over, there were 103.7 males.

The median income for a household in the town was $25,000, and the median income for a family was $27,014. Males had a median income of $21,528 versus $22,000 for females. The per capita income for the town was $14,052. About 10.9% of families and 16.8% of the population were below the poverty line, including 18.1% of those under age 18 and 12.1% of those age 65 or over.

== Notable people ==
- John C. Sibbald, Wisconsin State Representative, lived in the town and owned a general store; Sibbald served as town clerk and town chairman of the town of Pratt before the name was changed to the town of Grandview
