= Sioux, Wisconsin =

- Unincorporated community
- Location within Wisconsin Location within the United States
- Coordinates: 46°44′14″N 90°52′49″W
- Country: United States
- State: Wisconsin
- County: Bayfield
- Town: Bayview
- Elevation: 607 ft (185 m)
- Time zone: UTC-6 (Central (CST))
  - Summer (DST): UTC-5 (CDT)
- Area codes: 715 and 534
- GNIS feature ID: 1577823

Sioux is an unincorporated community located in the town of Bayview, Bayfield County, Wisconsin, United States.

This community was named after the Sioux people.
