= Ino, Wisconsin =

- Unincorporated community
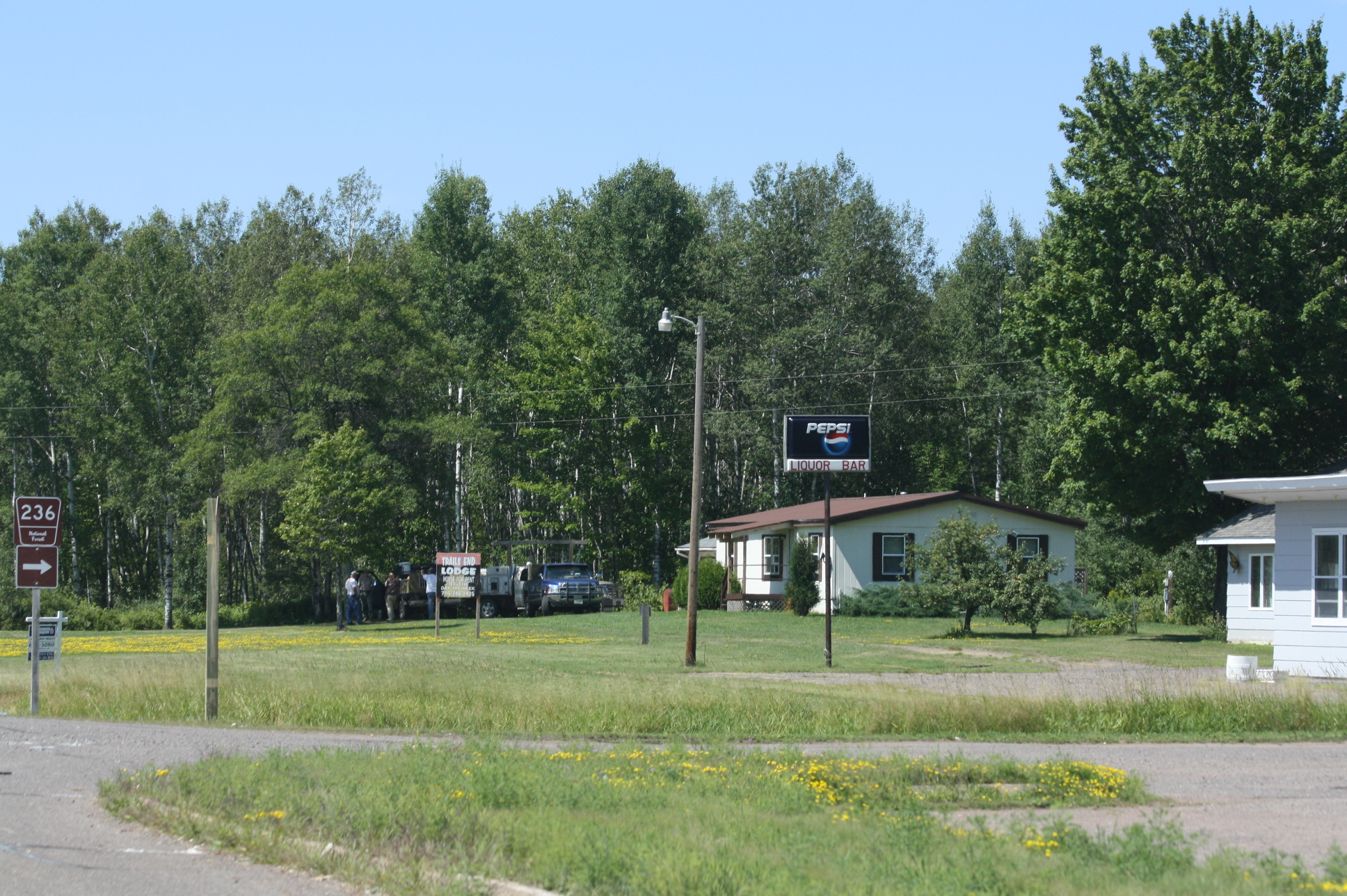
- Buildings in Ino

- Location within Wisconsin Location within the United States
- Coordinates: 46°31′51″N 91°10′44″W
- Country: United States
- State: Wisconsin
- County: Bayfield
- Town: Keystone
- Elevation: 978 ft (298 m)
- Time zone: UTC-6 (Central (CST))
  - Summer (DST): UTC-5 (CDT)
- Area codes: 715 and 534
- GNIS feature ID: 1579512

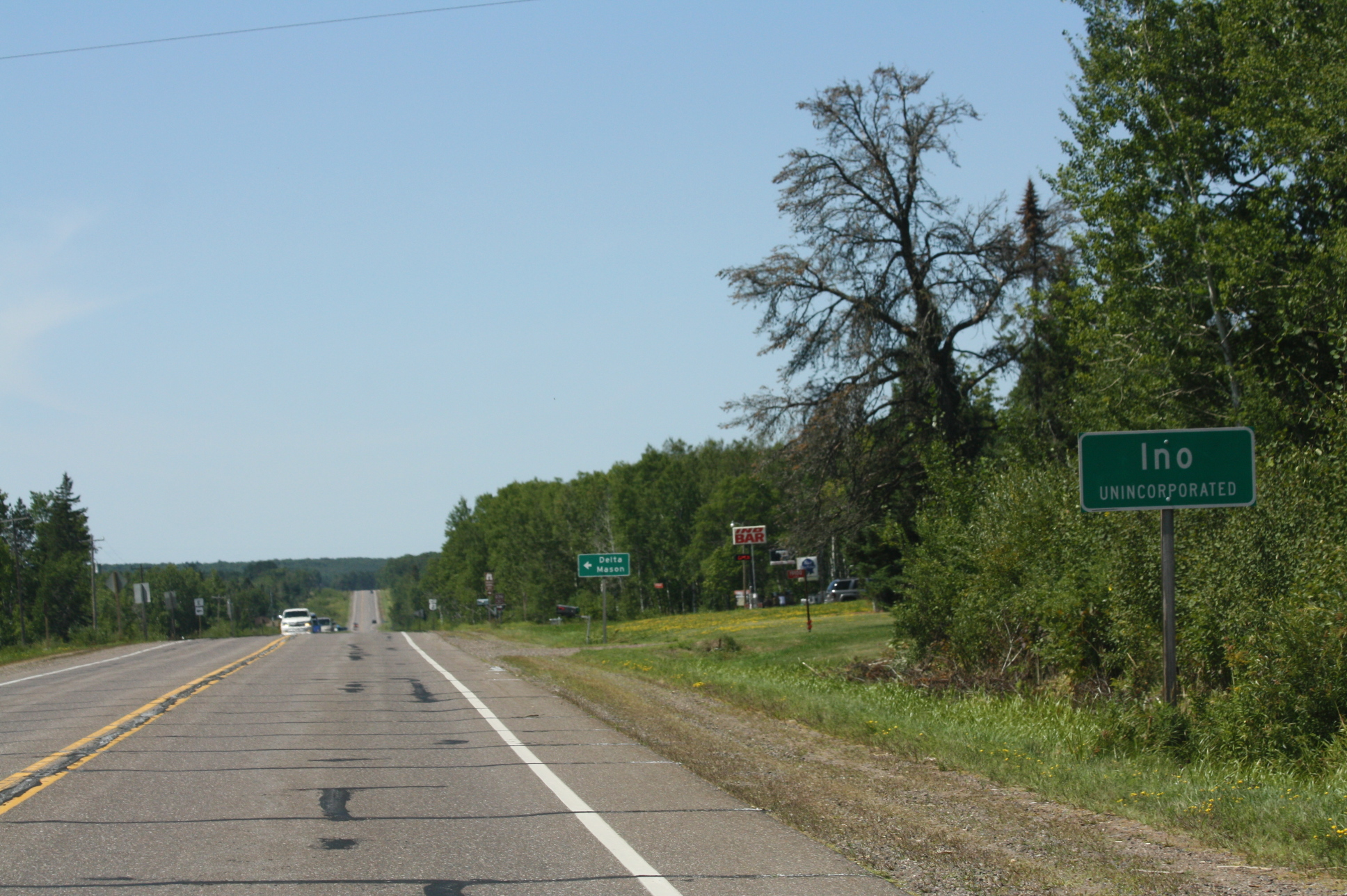
Looking west at the sign for Ino along U.S. 2

Ino is an unincorporated community in the town of Keystone, Bayfield County, Wisconsin, United States. Ino is located at the junction of U.S. Highway 2, County Highway E, and Forest Road 236. It is 15 miles (24 km) west of Ashland.
