= Laurie E. Carlson =

American basketball player and politician

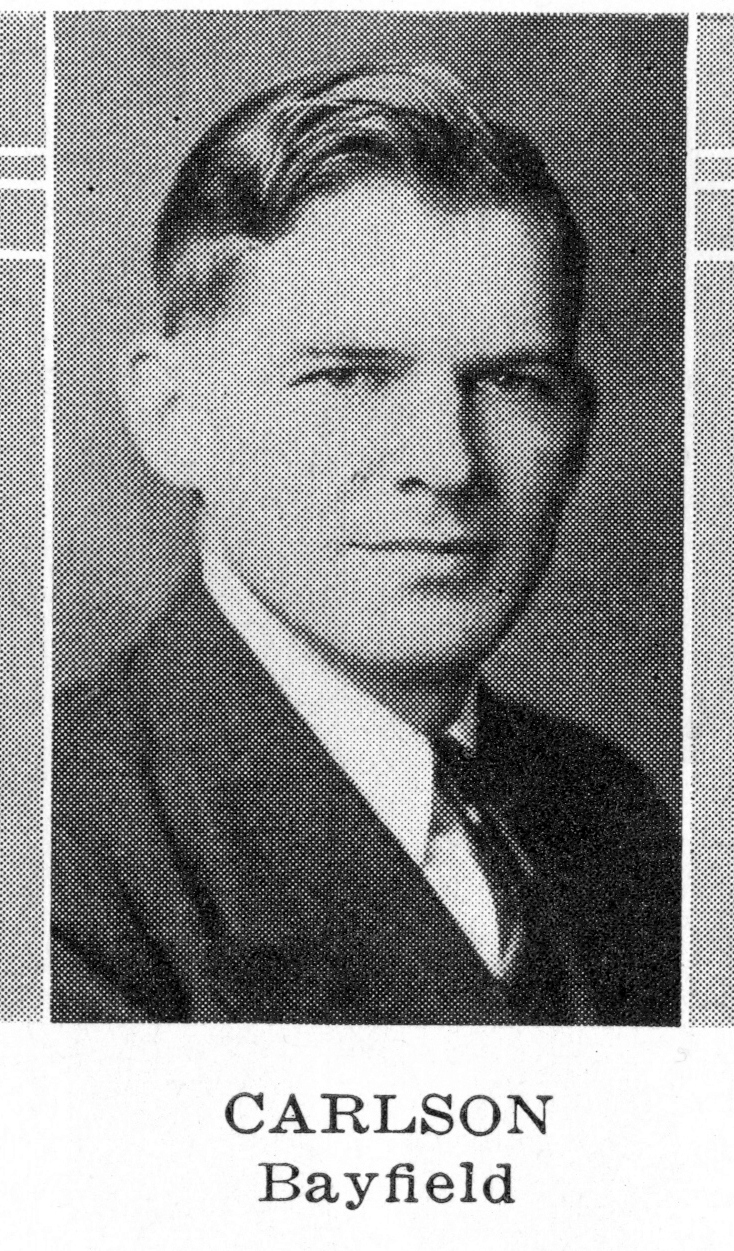
Laurie Edwin Carlson

Laurie E. Carlson (January 12, 1908 – March 26, 1999) was a member of the Wisconsin State Assembly.

== Biography ==
Carlson was born Laurie Edwin Carlson on January 12, 1908, in Bayfield, Wisconsin. He attended Northland College, where he was a member of the varsity basketball team, and the University of Wisconsin–Madison. Carlson was also active in promoting the sport of curling. He married Helen Whipple and have four children. Carlson died on March 26, 1999. After his death, a joint resolution by the Wisconsin State Senate and the State Assembly was created to honor his life and was presented to his children. To honor Carlson's lifelong commitment to progressive laws, regulations and policies, his family established The Laurie Carlson Progressive Ideas Forum at the UW-Madison, and the Forum brings speakers and guests to Madison on a regular basis.

== Political career ==
Carlson was a founding member of the Wisconsin Progressive Party. He won the party's nomination over John C. Sibbald in 1936 and was elected to the Assembly that year, taking office the following year. He served until 1942. Later, he served as Clerk of Courts of Dane County, Wisconsin from 1968 to 1976.
