= Pilsen, Wisconsin =

- Town
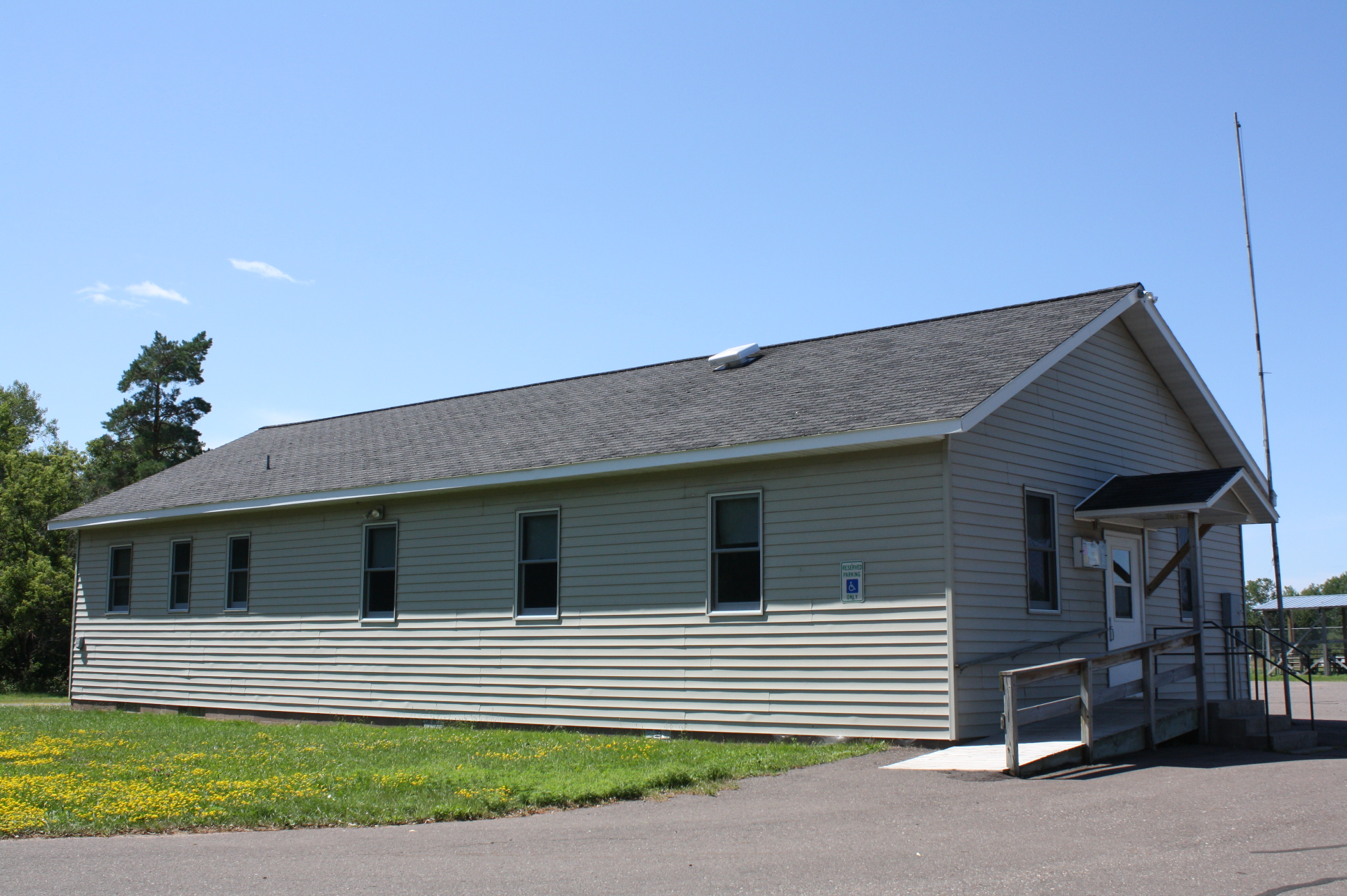
- Town hall

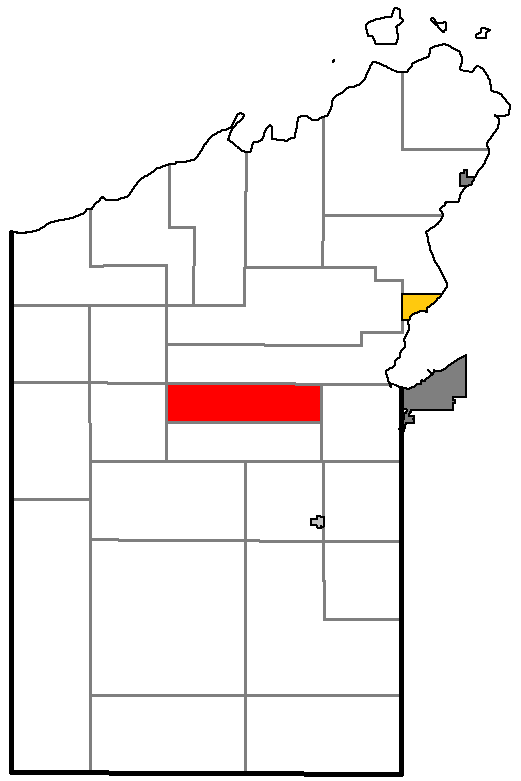
- Location of Pilsen, within Bayfield County
- Coordinates: 46°34′01″N 91°10′47″W
- Country: United States
- State: Wisconsin
- County: Bayfield

Area
  - Total: 35.1 sq mi (90.9 km^{2})
  - Land: 34.9 sq mi (90.4 km^{2})
  - Water: 0.19 sq mi (0.5 km^{2})
- Elevation: 1,263 ft (385 m)

Population (2020)
  - Total: 216
  - Density: 6.19/sq mi (2.39/km^{2})
- Time zone: UTC-6 (Central (CST))
  - Summer (DST): UTC-5 (CDT)
- Area codes: 715 & 534
- FIPS code: 55-62700
- GNIS feature ID: 1583923

Pilsen is a town in Bayfield County, Wisconsin, United States. The population was 216 at the 2020 census, up from 210 at the 2010 census. The unincorporated community of Moquah is located in the town.

== Geography ==
According to the United States Census Bureau, the town has a total area of 35.1 square miles (90.9 km^{2}), of which 34.9 square miles (90.4 km^{2}) is land and 0.19 square miles (0.5 km^{2}), or 0.53%, is water.

== Demographics ==
As of the census of 2000, there were 203 people, 84 households, and 58 families residing in the town. The population density was 5.8 people per square mile (2.2/km^{2}). There were 104 housing units at an average density of 3.0 per square mile (1.2/km^{2}). The racial makeup of the town was 99.51% White, and 0.49% from two or more races.

There were 84 households, out of which 23.8% had children under the age of 18 living with them, 60.7% were married couples living together, 4.8% had a female householder with no husband present, and 29.8% were non-families. 26.2% of all households were made up of individuals, and 16.7% had someone living alone who was 65 years of age or older. The average household size was 2.42 and the average family size was 2.93.

In the town, the population was spread out, with 20.7% under the age of 18, 7.4% from 18 to 24, 26.6% from 25 to 44, 29.1% from 45 to 64, and 16.3% who were 65 years of age or older. The median age was 44 years. For every 100 females, there were 97.1 males. For every 100 females age 18 and over, there were 103.8 males.

The median income for a household in the town was $45,000, and the median income for a family was $47,813. Males had a median income of $35,250 versus $18,750 for females. The per capita income for the town was $17,895. None of the families and 2.1% of the population were living below the poverty line, including no under eighteens and 12.9% of those over 64.
