= Iron River, Wisconsin =

- Town
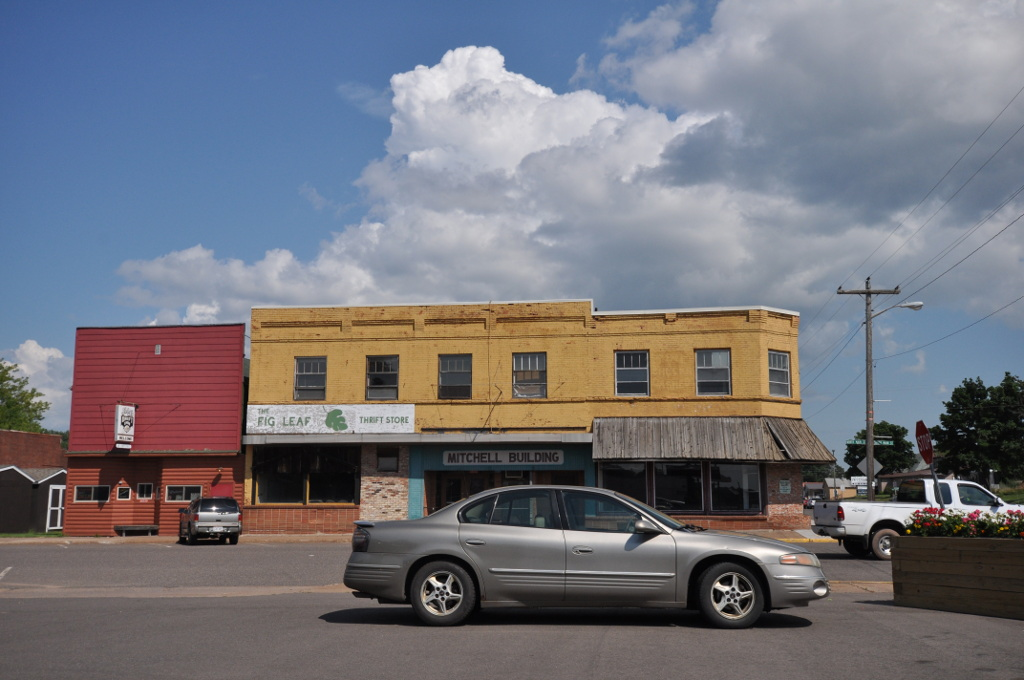
- Downtown Iron River

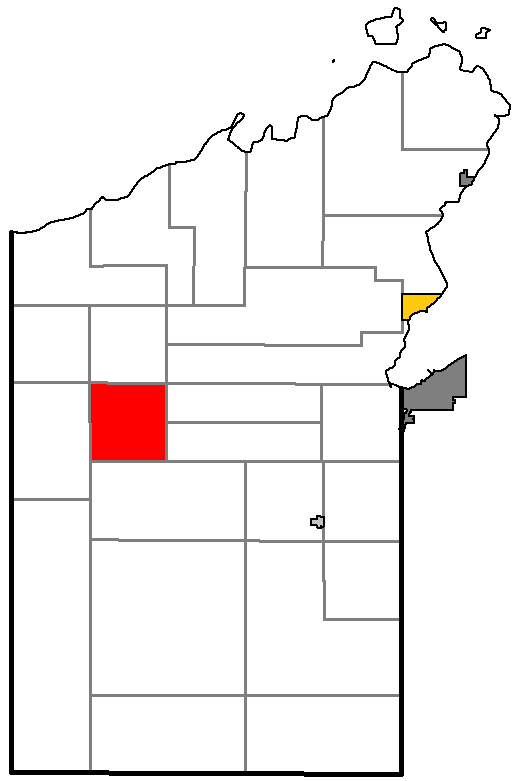
- Location of Iron River, within Bayfield County
- Coordinates: 46°33′1″N 91°23′2″W
- Country: United States
- State: Wisconsin
- County: Bayfield

Area
  - Total: 34.9 sq mi (90.4 km^{2})
  - Land: 31.5 sq mi (81.6 km^{2})
  - Water: 3.4 sq mi (8.8 km^{2})
- Elevation: 1,207 ft (368 m)

Population (2020)
  - Total: 1,240
  - Density: 39.4/sq mi (15.2/km^{2})
- Time zone: UTC-6 (Central (CST))
  - Summer (DST): UTC-5 (CDT)
- ZIP code: 54847
- Area codes: 715 and 534
- FIPS code: 55-37200
- GNIS feature ID: 1583434
- Website: www.townofironriver.com

Iron River is a town in Bayfield County, Wisconsin, United States. The population was 1,240 at the 2020 census, up from 1,123 at the 2010 census. The census-designated place of Iron River is located in the town. The unincorporated community of Topside is also located in the town.

== Geography ==
According to the United States Census Bureau, the town has a total area of 34.9 square miles (90.4 km^{2}), of which 31.5 square miles (81.6 km^{2}) is land and 3.4 square miles (8.8 km^{2}), or 9.73%, is water.

Iron River is located 27 miles (43 km) west of the city of Ashland and 37 miles (60 km) east of the city of Superior.

== Demographics ==
At the 2000 census, there were 1,059 people, 485 households and 311 families residing in the town. The population density was 33.7 per square mile (13.0/km^{2}). There were 973 housing units at an average density of 31.0 per square mile (12.0/km^{2}). The racial make-up was 96.79% White, 1.32% Native American, 0.57% Asian, and 1.32% from two or more races. Hispanic or Latino of any race were 0.38% of the population.

There were 485 households, of which 23.1% had children under the age of 18 living with them, 51.3% were married couples living together, 6.8% had a female householder with no husband present, and 35.7% were non-families. 30.9% of all households were made up of individuals, and 16.5% had someone living alone who was 65 years of age or older. The average household size was 2.18 and the average family size was 2.68.

19.9% of the population were under the age of 18, 6.0% from 18 to 24, 22.9% from 25 to 44, 28.0% from 45 to 64, and 23.0% who were 65 years of age or older. The median age was 46 years. For every 100 females, there were 98.7 males. For every 100 females age 18 and over, there were 95.8 males.

The median household income was $28,796 and the median family income was $36,597. Males had a median income of $30,060 and females $18,125. The per capita income was $16,449. About 10.2% of families and 15.4% of the population were below the poverty line, including 28.2% of those under age 18 and 12.4% of those age 65 or over.

== Arts and culture ==
=== Blueberry Festival ===
The Iron River Lion's Club sponsors the annual Blueberry Festival at Moon Lake Park in July. The festival includes rides, crafts, food and games.

=== Bayfield County Fair ===
The Bayfield County Fair takes place annually in August and includes grandstand shows, exhibitions and carnival rides.

== Education ==
Iron River Public Schools belong to the Maple School District. There are two elementary schools, a middle school and a high school in the district. Students attend Northwestern High School.

== Infrastructure ==
=== Transportation ===
U.S. Highway 2 serves as a main route in the community. Other routes include County Highways A and H.
