= Leonards, Wisconsin =

- Unincorporated community
- Location within Wisconsin Location within the United States
- Coordinates: 46°10′11″N 91°19′17″W
- Country: United States
- State: Wisconsin
- County: Bayfield
- Town: Cable
- Elevation: 1,306 ft (398 m)
- Time zone: UTC-6 (Central (CST))
  - Summer (DST): UTC-5 (CDT)
- Area codes: 715 and 534
- GNIS feature ID: 1579645

Leonards is an unincorporated community located in the town of Cable, Bayfield County, Wisconsin, United States.

== History ==
A post office called Leonard was in operation from 1899 until 1905. The community was named for F. C. Leonard, a businessperson in the logging industry.
