= Bark Point, Wisconsin =

- unincorporated community
- Location within Wisconsin Location within the United States
- Coordinates: 46°53′04″N 91°11′05″W
- Country: United States
- State: Wisconsin
- County: Bayfield
- Town: Clover
- Elevation: 630 ft (190 m)
- Time zone: UTC-6 (Central (CST))
  - Summer (DST): UTC-5 (CDT)
- Area codes: 715 and 534
- GNIS feature ID: 1578859

Bark Point is an unincorporated community in the town of Clover, Bayfield County, Wisconsin, United States. Bark Point is located on Lake Superior at the tip of a landmass also called Bark Point, 5 miles (8.0 km) northeast of Herbster and 18 miles (29 km) west-northwest of Bayfield.
