= Cable (CDP), Wisconsin =

Census-designated place in Wisconsin, United States

Cable, Wisconsin
- Census-designated place
- Location within Wisconsin
- Coordinates: 46°12′29″N 91°17′32″W
- Country: United States
- State: Wisconsin
- County: Bayfield
- Town: Cable

Area
  - Total: 1.043 sq mi (2.70 km^{2})
  - Land: 1.043 sq mi (2.70 km^{2})
  - Water: 0 sq mi (0 km^{2})
- Elevation: 1,368 ft (417 m)

Population (2020)
  - Total: 177
  - Density: 170/sq mi (65.5/km^{2})
- Time zone: UTC-6 (Central (CST))
  - Summer (DST): UTC-5 (CDT)
- ZIP code: 54821
- Area codes: 715 and 534
- GNIS feature ID: 1578909

Cable is an unincorporated, census-designated place located in the Town of Cable, Bayfield County, Wisconsin, United States.

The community is 16 miles (26 km) northeast of the city of Hayward along U.S. Highway 63 at County Highway M

Cable has a post office with ZIP code 54821. As of the 2020 census, its population was 177, a decline from the figure of 206 tabulated in 2010.

== History ==
Cable was laid out in 1878. It was named for R. Cable, a local hotel owner. A post office called Cable has been in operation since 1882.
