= Barksdale (community), Wisconsin =

Barksdale, Wisconsin
- unincorporated community
- Location within Wisconsin Location within the United States
- Coordinates: 46°37′17″N 90°55′56″W
- Country: United States
- State: Wisconsin
- County: Bayfield
- Town: Barksdale
- Elevation: 650 ft (200 m)
- Time zone: UTC-6 (Central (CST))
  - Summer (DST): UTC-5 (CDT)
- Area codes: 715 and 534
- GNIS feature ID: 1561173

Barksdale is an unincorporated community in the town of Barksdale, Bayfield County, Wisconsin, United States. Barksdale is located on Wisconsin Highway 13, 4 miles (6.4 km) south-southwest of Washburn.

== History ==
Barksdale was named in 1904 for H. M. Barksdale, the president of a local powder mill. A post office was established at Barksdale in 1904, and remained in operation until it was discontinued in 1966.
