= Keystone, Wisconsin =

- Town
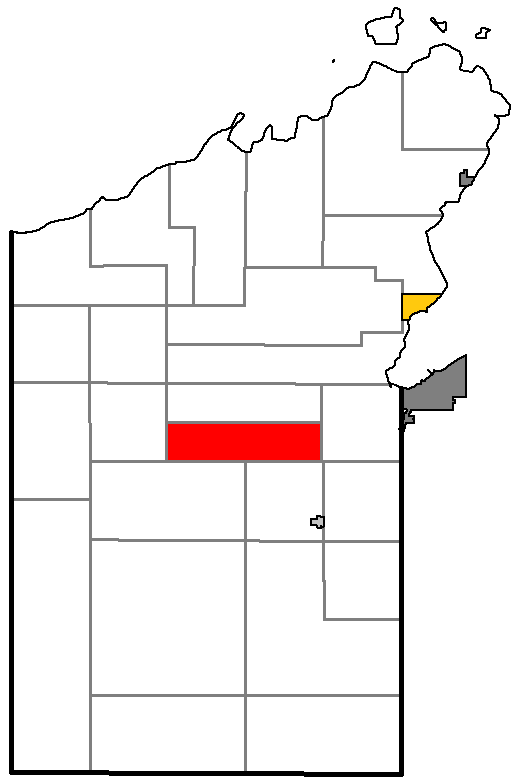
- Location of Keystone, within Bayfield County
- Coordinates: 46°31′26″N 91°11′19″W
- Country: United States
- State: Wisconsin
- County: Bayfield

Area
  - Total: 36.1 sq mi (93.4 km^{2})
  - Land: 35.8 sq mi (92.7 km^{2})
  - Water: 0.27 sq mi (0.7 km^{2})
- Elevation: 974 ft (297 m)

Population (2020)
  - Total: 373
  - Density: 10.4/sq mi (4.02/km^{2})
- Time zone: UTC-6 (Central (CST))
  - Summer (DST): UTC-5 (CDT)
- Area codes: 715 & 534
- FIPS code: 55-39425
- GNIS feature ID: 1583476
- Website: https://townofkeystonewi.gov/

Keystone is a town in Bayfield County, Wisconsin, United States. The population was 373 at the 2020 census, down from 378 at the 2010 census. The unincorporated community of Ino is located in the town.

== Geography ==
According to the United States Census Bureau, the town has a total area of 36.1 square miles (93.4 km^{2}), of which 35.8 square miles (92.7 km^{2}) is land and 0.27 square miles (0.7 km^{2}), or 0.75%, is water.

== Demographics ==
As of the census of 2000, there were 369 people, 146 households, and 109 families residing in the town. The population density was 10.3 people per square mile (4.0/km^{2}). There were 186 housing units at an average density of 5.2 per square mile (2.0/km^{2}). The racial makeup of the town was 95.93% White, 3.25% Native American, and 0.81% from two or more races. Hispanic or Latino of any race were 0.81% of the population.

There were 146 households, out of which 30.1% had children under the age of 18 living with them, 61.6% were married couples living together, 6.2% had a female householder with no husband present, and 24.7% were non-families. 20.5% of all households were made up of individuals, and 9.6% had someone living alone who was 65 years of age or older. The average household size was 2.53 and the average family size was 2.91.

In the town, the population was spread out, with 23.0% under the age of 18, 4.6% from 18 to 24, 25.7% from 25 to 44, 27.9% from 45 to 64, and 18.7% who were 65 years of age or older. The median age was 42 years. For every 100 females, there were 103.9 males. For every 100 females age 18 and over, there were 104.3 males.

The median income for a household in the town was $40,500, and the median income for a family was $41,625. Males had a median income of $33,333 versus $19,219 for females. The per capita income for the town was $15,638. About 15.3% of families and 20.0% of the population were below the poverty line, including 38.2% of those under age 18 and 7.5% of those age 65 or over.
