= Delta, Wisconsin =

- Town
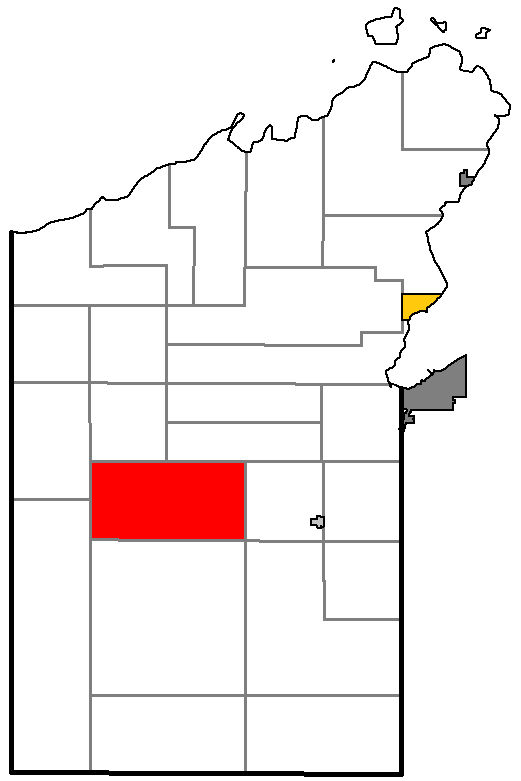
- Location of Delta, within Bayfield County
- Coordinates: 46°28′23″N 91°19′9″W
- Country: United States
- State: Wisconsin
- County: Bayfield

Area
  - Total: 72.3 sq mi (187.2 km^{2})
  - Land: 69.8 sq mi (180.7 km^{2})
  - Water: 2.5 sq mi (6.5 km^{2})
- Elevation: 1,004 ft (306 m)

Population (2020)
  - Total: 315
  - Density: 4.51/sq mi (1.74/km^{2})
- Time zone: UTC-6 (Central (CST))
  - Summer (DST): UTC-5 (CDT)
- ZIP code: 54856
- Area codes: 715 and 534
- FIPS code: 55-19662
- GNIS feature ID: 1583073
- Website: www.townofdelta.com

Delta is a town in Bayfield County, Wisconsin, United States. The population was 315 at the 2020 census, up from 273 at the 2010 census. The unincorporated communities of Delta and Pike River are located in the town. The unincorporated community of Sutherland is located partially in the town.

== Transportation ==
County H and Delta–Drummond Road are two of the main routes in the community.

== Geography ==
According to the United States Census Bureau, the town has a total area of 72.3 square miles (187.2 km^{2}), of which 69.8 square miles (180.7 km^{2}) is land and 2.5 square miles (6.5 km^{2}), or 3.46%, is water.

== Demographics ==
At the 2000 census there were 235 people, 107 households, and 77 families in the town. The population density was 3.4 people per square mile (1.3/km^{2}). There were 328 housing units at an average density of 4.7 per square mile (1.8/km^{2}). The racial makeup of the town was 98.30% White and 1.70% Native American. Hispanic or Latino of any race were 0.43%.

Of the 107 households 20.6% had children under the age of 18 living with them, 64.5% were married couples living together, 1.9% had a female householder with no husband present, and 28.0% were non-families. 26.2% of households were one person and 19.6% were one person aged 65 or older. The average household size was 2.20 and the average family size was 2.53.

The age distribution was 17.9% under the age of 18, 3.0% from 18 to 24, 25.5% from 25 to 44, 27.2% from 45 to 64, and 26.4% 65 or older. The median age was 46 years. For every 100 females, there were 123.8 males. For every 100 females age 18 and over, there were 121.8 males.

The median household income was $37,679 and the median family income was $44,375. Males had a median income of $30,250 versus $28,125 for females. The per capita income for the town was $19,697. None of the families and 3.6% of the population were living below the poverty line, including no under eighteens and 6.1% of those over 64.
