= Iron River (CDP), Wisconsin =

Census-designated place in Wisconsin, United States

Iron River, Wisconsin
- Census-designated place
- Location within Wisconsin
- Coordinates: 46°33′52″N 91°24′30″W
- Country: United States
- State: Wisconsin
- County: Bayfield
- Town: Iron River

Area
  - Total: 6.771 sq mi (17.54 km^{2})
  - Land: 6.245 sq mi (16.17 km^{2})
  - Water: 0.526 sq mi (1.36 km^{2})
- Elevation: 1,106 ft (337 m)

Population (2020)
  - Total: 768
  - Density: 123/sq mi (47.5/km^{2})
- Time zone: UTC-6 (Central (CST))
  - Summer (DST): UTC-5 (CDT)
- ZIP code: 54847
- Area codes: 715 and 534
- GNIS feature ID: 1566972

Iron River is an unincorporated, census-designated place located in the town of Iron River, Bayfield County, Wisconsin, United States.

U.S. Highway 2 serves as a main route in the community. Other routes include County Highways A and H.

Intercity bus service to the community is provided by Indian Trails.

Iron River is 27 miles (43 km) west of the city of Ashland and 37 miles (60 km) east of the city of Superior.

Iron River has a post office with ZIP code 54847.

As of the 2020 census, its population was 768, slightly up from 761 at the 2010 census.

Iron River is the home of the Bayfield County Fair. The Fair takes place annually in August.
