= Namakagon, Wisconsin =

- Town
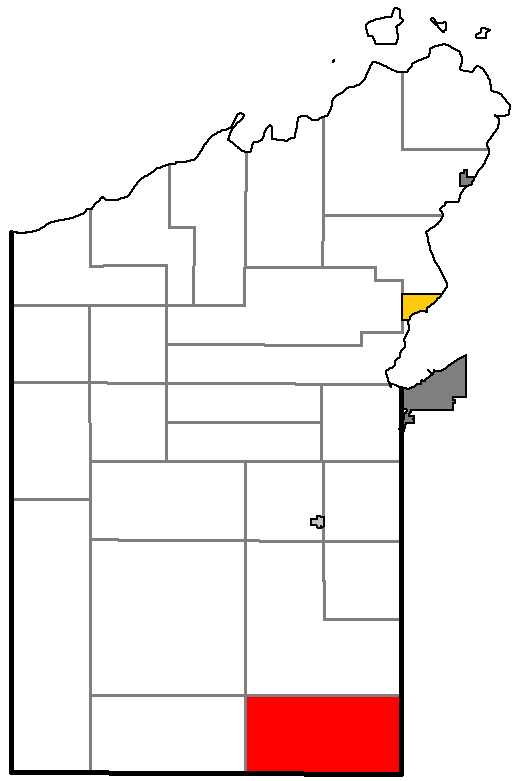
- Location of Namakagon, within Bayfield County
- Coordinates: 46°12′6″N 91°3′20″W
- Country: United States
- State: Wisconsin
- County: Bayfield

Area
  - Total: 72.2 sq mi (186.9 km^{2})
  - Land: 65.1 sq mi (168.7 km^{2})
  - Water: 7.0 sq mi (18.2 km^{2})
- Elevation: 1,434 ft (437 m)

Population (2020)
  - Total: 316
  - Density: 4.85/sq mi (1.87/km^{2})
- Time zone: UTC-6 (Central (CST))
  - Summer (DST): UTC-5 (CDT)
- Area codes: 715 & 534
- FIPS code: 55-55375
- GNIS feature ID: 1583776
- Website: namakagon-wi.org

Namakagon is a town in Bayfield County, Wisconsin, United States. The population was 316 at the 2020 census, up from 246 at the 2010 census.

== Geography ==
According to the United States Census Bureau, the town has a total area of 72.2 square miles (186.9 km^{2}), of which 65.1 square miles (168.7 km^{2}) is land and 7.0 square miles (18.2 km^{2}), or 9.75%, is water.

== Demographics ==
As of the census of 2000, there were 285 people, 149 households, and 98 families residing in the town. The population density was 4.4 people per square mile (1.7/km^{2}). There were 532 housing units at an average density of 8.2 per square mile (3.2/km^{2}). The racial makeup of the town was 100.00% White.

There were 149 households, out of which 10.1% had children under the age of 18 living with them, 55.7% were married couples living together, 6.0% had a female householder with no husband present, and 34.2% were non-families. 26.8% of all households were made up of individuals, and 11.4% had someone living alone who was 65 years of age or older. The average household size was 1.91 and the average family size was 2.20.

In the town, the population was spread out, with 9.8% under the age of 18, 1.4% from 18 to 24, 17.5% from 25 to 44, 38.9% from 45 to 64, and 32.3% who were 65 years of age or older. The median age was 59 years. For every 100 females, there were 103.6 males. For every 100 females age 18 and over, there were 97.7 males.

The median income for a household in the town was $20,625, and the median income for a family was $22,188. Males had a median income of $21,500 versus $20,000 for females. The per capita income for the town was $17,576. About 19.8% of families and 20.8% of the population were below the poverty line, including 52.6% of those under the age of eighteen and 17.7% of those 65 or over.
