= Cable, Wisconsin =

- Town
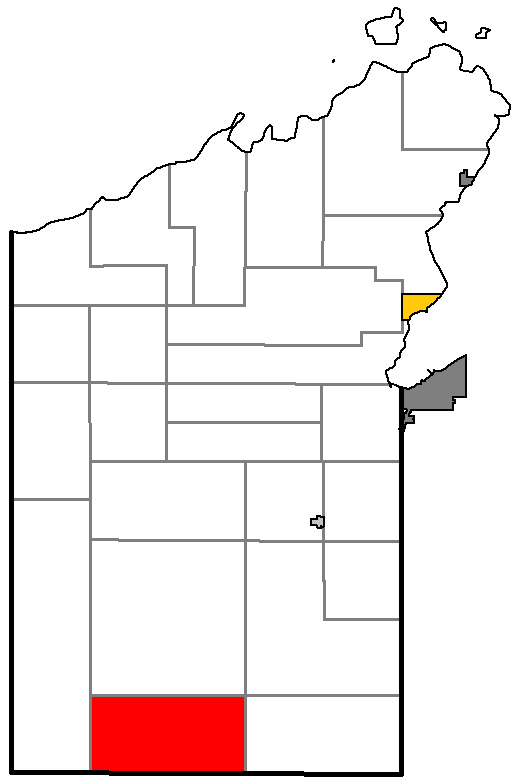
- Location of Cable in Bayfield County, Wisconsin
- Coordinates: 46°12′11″N 91°16′0″W
- Country: United States
- State: Wisconsin
- County: Bayfield

Area
  - Total: 71.4 sq mi (185.0 km^{2})
  - Land: 69.3 sq mi (179.6 km^{2})
  - Water: 2.0 sq mi (5.3 km^{2})
- Elevation: 1,362 ft (415 m)

Population (2020)
  - Total: 853
  - Density: 12.3/sq mi (4.75/km^{2})
- Time zone: UTC-6 (Central (CST))
  - Summer (DST): UTC-5 (CDT)
- ZIP code: 54821
- Area codes: 715 and 534
- FIPS code: 55-11675
- GNIS feature ID: 1582898
- Website: townofcable.com

Cable is a town in Bayfield County, Wisconsin, United States. Its population was 853 at the 2020 census, up from 825 at the 2010 U.S. census. The census-designated place of Cable and the unincorporated communities of Leonards and Radspur are located in the town.

Telemark Lodge, a ski resort, was located in the town. Today the grounds are occupied by the American Birkebeiner Ski Foundation.

== Geography ==
According to the United States Census Bureau, the town has a total area of 71.4 square miles (185.0 km^{2}), of which 69.3 square miles (179.6 km^{2}) is land and 2.0 square miles (5.3 km^{2}), or 2.89%, is water.

Cable is located 16 miles (26 km) northeast of the city of Hayward along U.S. Highway 63 at County Highway M.

The Namekagon River, a tributary of the St. Croix River and part of the Saint Croix National Scenic Riverway, flows through the town.

== Demographics ==
As of the census of 2000, there were 836 people, 381 households, and 230 families residing in the town. The population density was 12.1 people per square mile (4.7/km^{2}). There were 697 housing units at an average density of 10.1 per square mile (3.9/km^{2}). The racial makeup of the town was 99.16% White, 0.24% Native American, 0.12% Asian, 0.24% from other races, and 0.24% from two or more races. Hispanic or Latino of any race were 0.12% of the population.

There were 381 households, out of which 24.1% had children under the age of 18 living with them, 49.9% were married couples living together, 6.6% had a female householder with no husband present, and 39.4% were non-families. 32.3% of all households were made up of individuals, and 11.5% had someone living alone who was 65 years of age or older. The average household size was 2.19 and the average family size was 2.76.

In the town, the population was spread out, with 22.1% under the age of 18, 3.2% from 18 to 24, 30.1% from 25 to 44, 28.5% from 45 to 64, and 16.0% who were 65 years of age or older. The median age was 42 years. For every 100 females, there were 104.9 males. For every 100 females age 18 and over, there were 104.1 males.

The median income for a household in the town was $31,250, and the median income for a family was $36,250. Males had a median income of $26,645 versus $16,484 for females. The per capita income for the town was $16,985. About 8.5% of families and 11.8% of the population were below the poverty line, including 16.3% of those under age 18 and 13.6% of those age 65 or over.

== Transportation ==
U.S. Highway 63 and County Highway M serve as main routes in the community. Cable is served by the Cable Union Airport (FAA LID: 3CU).

== Recreation ==
Cable is the starting point of the American Birkebeiner cross-country skiing race, which ends in nearby Hayward, and the end point of the Chequamegon Fat Tire Festival mountain bike race. The track for the American Birkebeiner is turned into a fat tire bike race once a year called the "Fat Bike Birkie". This is the largest fat tire bike race in the continental United States attracting more than 1,200 riders.

== See also ==
- Telemark Lodge
