= Barksdale, Wisconsin =

- Town
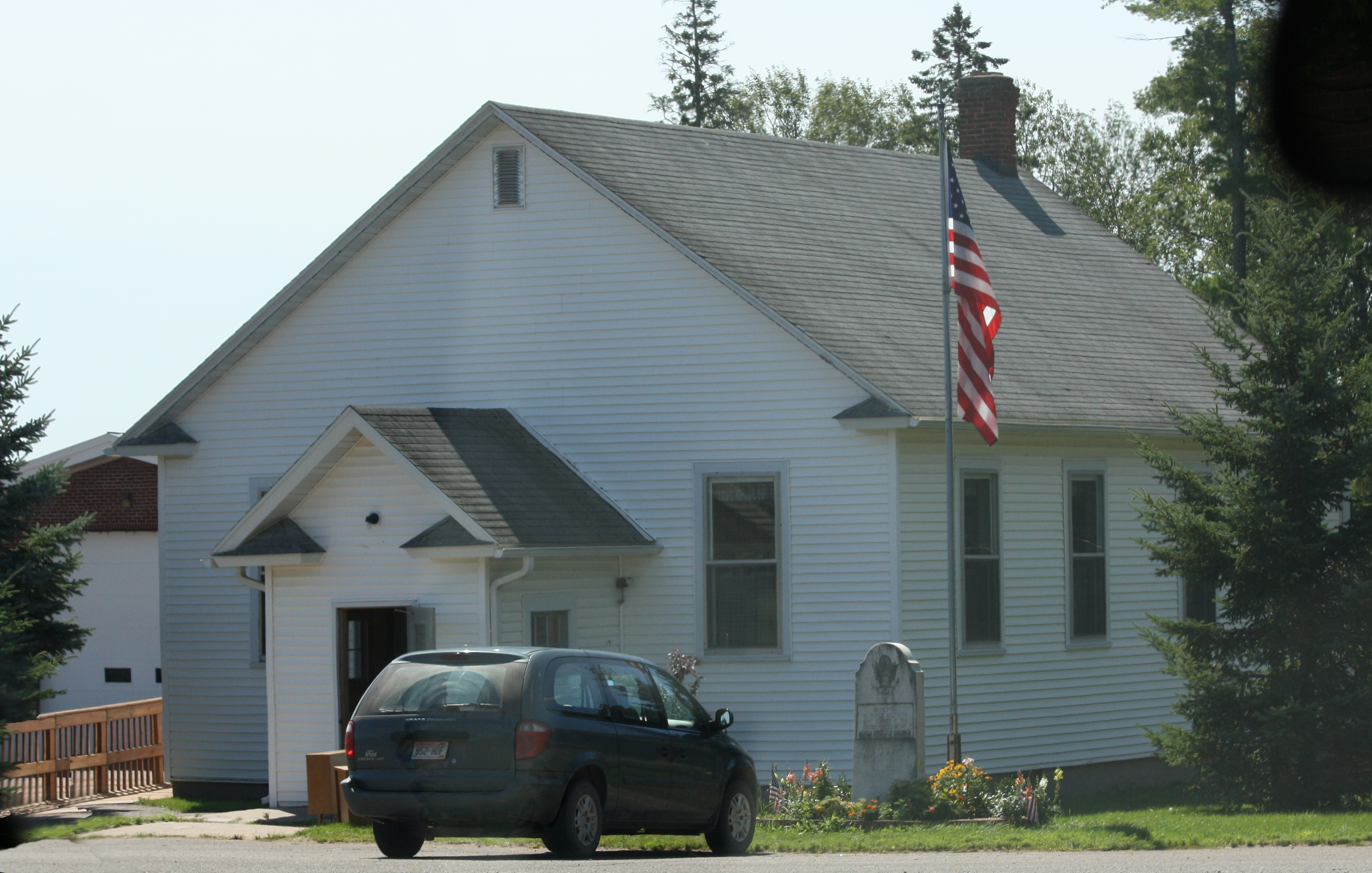
- Town hall

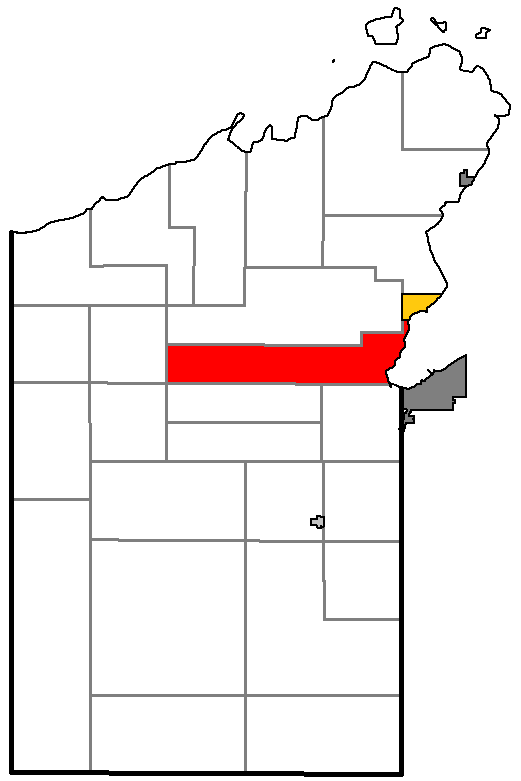
- Location of Barksdale, within Bayfield County
- Coordinates: 46°35′41″N 91°1′35″W
- Country: United States
- State: Wisconsin
- County: Bayfield

Area
  - Total: 66.3 sq mi (171.7 km^{2})
  - Land: 55.2 sq mi (142.9 km^{2})
  - Water: 11.1 sq mi (28.8 km^{2})
- Elevation: 1,145 ft (349 m)

Population (2020)
  - Total: 745
  - Density: 13.5/sq mi (5.21/km^{2})
- Time zone: UTC-6 (Central (CST))
  - Summer (DST): UTC-5 (CDT)
- ZIP code: 54891
- Area codes: 715 and 534
- FIPS code: 55-04725
- GNIS feature ID: 1582751
- Website: sites.google.com/site/barksdaletown/

Barksdale is a town in Bayfield County, Wisconsin, United States. The population was 745 at the 2020 census, up from 723 at the 2010 census. The unincorporated community of Barksdale is located in the town. The town was named by William G. Ramsay, the chief engineer for the DuPont Chemical Company, for Hamilton M. Barksdale, vice president of DuPont.

The town was once the home of an explosives factory owned by the DuPont company. Press reports mention a number of fatal accidents. Four died in a dynamite explosion in October 1907. Two men were killed in an explosion on August 24, 1928. A larger explosion at the facility killed eight in October 1952.

== Transportation ==
Wisconsin Highway 13 serves as a main route in the town, running along its eastern edge.

== Geography ==
According to the United States Census Bureau, the town has a total area of 66.3 square miles (171.7 km^{2}), of which 55.2 square miles (142.9 km^{2}) is land and 11.1 square miles (28.8 km^{2}), or 16.78%, is water. The eastern end of the town extends into Chequamegon Bay, an arm of Lake Superior.

Barksdale is located 6 miles (10 km) northwest of the city of Ashland.

== Demographics ==
As of the census of 2000, there were 801 people, 303 households, and 232 families residing in the town. The population density was 14.5 people per square mile (5.6/km^{2}). There were 353 housing units at an average density of 6.4 per square mile (2.5/km^{2}). The racial makeup of the town was 96.63% White, 0.12% African American, 1.00% Native American, 0.37% Asian, and 1.87% from two or more races. Hispanic or Latino of any race were 0.50% of the population. 24.9% were of German, 14.1% Norwegian, 10.8% American, 6.7% Polish, 6.0% Swedish, 5.7% English and 5.6% Croatian ancestry according to Census 2000.

There were 303 households, out of which 31.7% had children under the age of 18 living with them, 69.3% were married couples living together, 3.0% had a female householder with no husband present, and 23.4% were non-families. 17.8% of all households were made up of individuals, and 7.6% had someone living alone who was 65 years of age or older. The average household size was 2.64 and the average family size was 2.97.

In the town, the population was spread out, with 25.6% under the age of 18, 6.4% from 18 to 24, 25.7% from 25 to 44, 31.2% from 45 to 64, and 11.1% who were 65 years of age or older. The median age was 40 years. For every 100 females, there were 98.3 males. For every 100 females age 18 and over, there were 100.7 males.

The median income for a household in the town was $45,714, and the median income for a family was $48,875. Males had a median income of $38,194 versus $24,722 for females. The per capita income for the town was $19,680. None of the families and 2.2% of the population were living below the poverty line, including no under eighteens and 2.8% of those over 64.
