= Bayfield County, Wisconsin =

County in Wisconsin, United States

- County
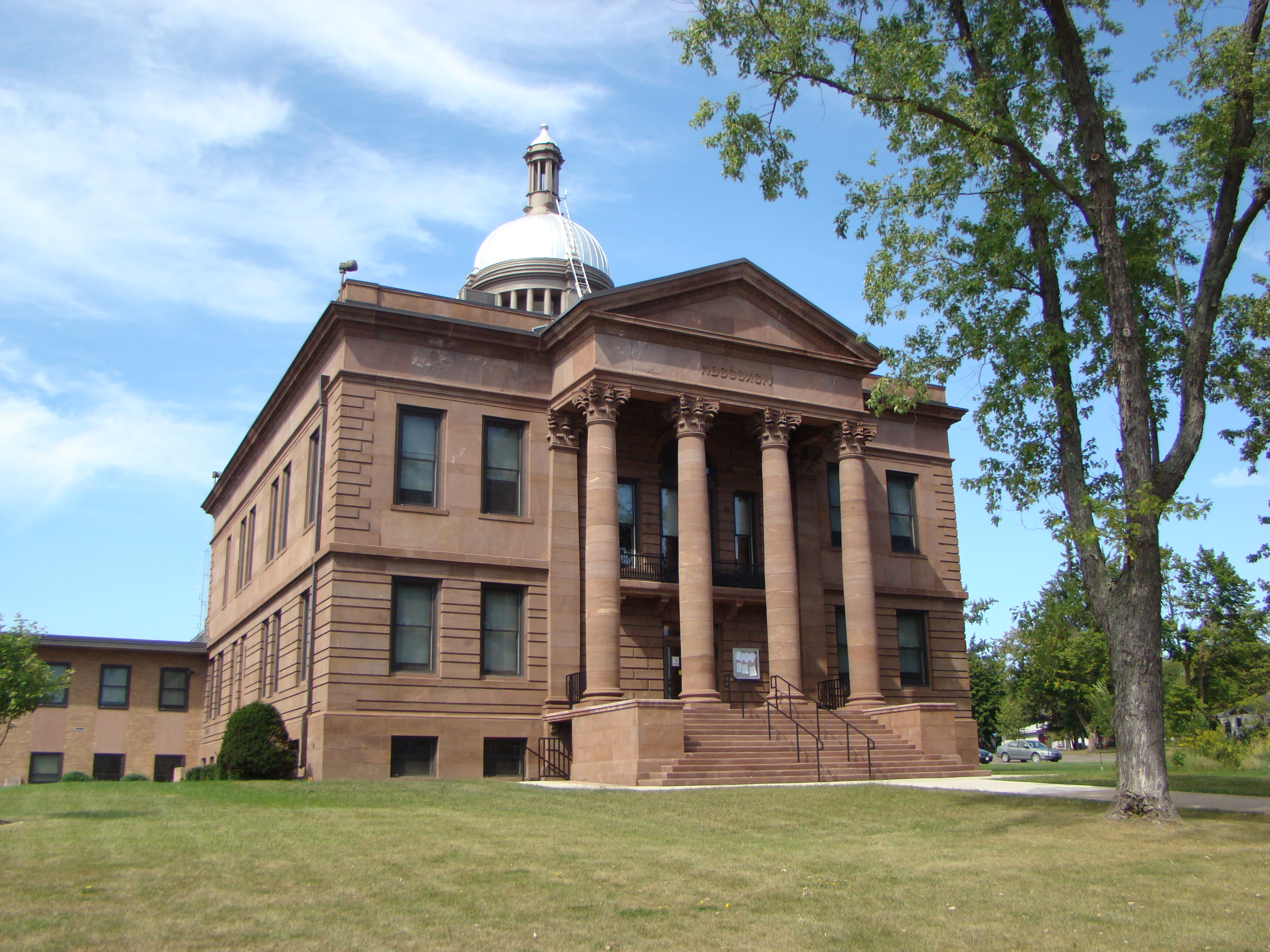
- Bayfield County Courthouse

- Location within the U.S. state of Wisconsin
- Coordinates: 46°38′N 91°11′W
- Country: United States
- State: Wisconsin
- Founded: 1845
- Named for: Henry Bayfield
- Seat: Washburn
- Largest city: Washburn

Area
  - Total: 2,042 sq mi (5,290 km^{2})
  - Land: 1,478 sq mi (3,830 km^{2})
  - Water: 564 sq mi (1,460 km^{2}) 28%

Population (2020)
  - Total: 16,220
  - Estimate (2025): 16,787 ▲
  - Density: 10.97/sq mi (4.237/km^{2})
- Time zone: UTC−6 (Central)
  - Summer (DST): UTC−5 (CDT)
- Congressional district: 7th
- Website: www.bayfieldcounty.wi.gov

Bayfield County is a county located in the U.S. state of Wisconsin. As of the 2020 census, its population is 16,220. Its county seat is Washburn. The county was created in 1845 and organized in 1850. The Red Cliff Band of Lake Superior Chippewa has a reservation in Bayfield County and is the county's largest employer. The county is considered a high-recreation retirement destination by the U.S. Department of Agriculture.

== History ==
Originally, in 1848 it was named La Pointe County, Wisconsin. After Douglas (1854) and Ashland (1860) Counties were split off from the original La Pointe County, the remainder was renamed Bayfield County on April 12, 1866.

== Geography ==
According to the U.S. Census Bureau, the county has a total area of 2,042 square miles (5,290 km^{2}), of which 1,478 square miles (3,830 km^{2}) is land and 564 square miles (1,460 km^{2}) (28%) is water. It is the third-largest county in Wisconsin by total area and second-largest by land area.

=== Adjacent counties ===
- Ashland County – east
- Sawyer County – south
- Washburn County – southwest
- Douglas County – west
- Lake County, Minnesota – north

=== Major highways ===
- U.S. Highway 2
- U.S. Highway 63
- Highway 13 (Wisconsin)
- Highway 27 (Wisconsin)
- Highway 118 (Wisconsin)
- Highway 137 (Wisconsin)

=== Buses ===
- Bay Area Rural Transit
- Indian Trails

=== Airport ===
Cable Union Airport (FAA LID: 3CU) serves Bayfield County and the surrounding communities.

=== National protected areas ===
- Apostle Islands National Lakeshore (part)
- Chequamegon National Forest (part)
- Whittlesey Creek National Wildlife Refuge

== Demographics ==
Historical population
Census	Pop.	Note	%±
1850	489		—
1860	353		−27.8%
1870	344		−2.5%
1880	564		64.0%
1890	7,390		1,210.3%
1900	14,392		94.7%
1910	15,987		11.1%
1920	17,201		7.6%
1930	15,006		−12.8%
1940	15,827		5.5%
1950	13,760		−13.1%
1960	11,910		−13.4%
1970	11,683		−1.9%
1980	13,822		18.3%
1990	14,008		1.3%
2000	15,013		7.2%
2010	15,014		0.0%
2020	16,220		8.0%
2025 (est.)	16,787	▲	3.5%
U.S. Decennial Census; 1790–1960 1900–1990; 1990–2000 2010 2020

=== Racial and ethnic composition ===
Bayfield County, Wisconsin – Racial and ethnic composition Note: the US Census treats Hispanic/Latino as an ethnic category. This table excludes Latinos from the racial categories and assigns them to a separate category. Hispanics/Latinos may be of any race.
Race / ethnicity (NH = Non-Hispanic)	Pop 1980	Pop 1990	Pop 2000	Pop 2010	Pop 2020	% 1980	% 1990	% 2000	% 2010	% 2020
White alone (NH)	12,824	12,676	13,247	12,955	13,445	92.78%	90.49%	88.24%	86.29%	82.89%
Black or African American alone (NH)	4	29	20	44	54	0.03%	0.21%	0.13%	0.29%	0.33%
Native American or Alaska Native alone (NH)	923	1,226	1,380	1,393	1,612	6.68%	8.75%	9.19%	9.28%	9.94%
Asian alone (NH)	24	24	41	48	36	0.17%	0.17%	0.27%	0.32%	0.22%
Native Hawaiian or Pacific Islander alone (NH)	x	x	1	1	2	x	x	0.01%	0.01%	0.01%
Other race alone (NH)	0	3	17	7	56	0.00%	0.02%	0.11%	0.05%	0.35%
Mixed race or Multiracial (NH)	x	x	216	408	736	x	x	1.44%	2.72%	4.54%
Hispanic or Latino (any race)	47	50	91	158	279	0.34%	0.36%	0.61%	1.05%	1.72%
Total	13,822	14,008	15,013	15,014	16,220	100.00%	100.00%	100.00%	100.00%	100.00%

=== 2020 census ===
As of the 2020 census, the county had a population of 16,220. The population density was 11.0 people per square mile (4.2 people/km^{2}). There were 13,238 housing units at an average density of 9.0 units per square mile (3.5 units/km^{2}).

The median age was 54.2 years. 17.1% of residents were under the age of 18 and 29.8% of residents were 65 years of age or older. For every 100 females there were 102.6 males, and for every 100 females age 18 and over there were 101.7 males age 18 and over.

The racial makeup of the county was 83.2% White, 0.4% Black or African American, 10.5% American Indian and Alaska Native, 0.2% Asian, <0.1% Native Hawaiian and Pacific Islander, 0.6% from some other race, and 5.2% from two or more races. Hispanic or Latino residents of any race comprised 1.7% of the population.

<0.1% of residents lived in urban areas, while 100.0% lived in rural areas.

There were 7,432 households in the county, of which 20.0% had children under the age of 18 living in them. Of all households, 51.1% were married-couple households, 20.9% were households with a male householder and no spouse or partner present, and 21.0% were households with a female householder and no spouse or partner present. About 30.8% of all households were made up of individuals and 15.5% had someone living alone who was 65 years of age or older.

Of the 13,238 housing units, 43.9% were vacant. Among occupied housing units, 80.8% were owner-occupied and 19.2% were renter-occupied. The homeowner vacancy rate was 2.2% and the rental vacancy rate was 10.9%.

=== 2010 census ===
As of the 2010 census, there were 15,014 people living in the county. 86.7% were White, 9.6% Native American, 0.3% Asian, 0.3% Black or African American, 0.2% of some other race and 2.9% of two or more races. 1.1% were Hispanic or Latino (of any race).

=== 2000 census ===
2000 Census Age Pyramid for Bayfield County

As of the census of 2000, there were 15,013 people, 6,207 households, and 4,276 families living in the county. The population density was 10 people per square mile (3.9 people/km^{2}). There were 11,640 housing units at an average density of 8 units per square mile (3.1 units/km^{2}). The racial makeup of the county was 88.46% White, 0.13% Black or African American, 9.39% Native American, 0.27% Asian, 0.01% Pacific Islander, 0.26% from other races, and 1.49% from two or more races. 0.61% of the population were Hispanic or Latino of any race. 23.3% were of German, 10.4% Norwegian, 8.4% Swedish, 6.1% Irish, 5.9% Polish, 5.7% Finnish and 5.0% English ancestry. 96.8% spoke English as their first language.

There were 6,207 households, out of which 28.90% had children under the age of 18 living with them, 55.90% were married couples living together, 7.80% had a female householder with no husband present, and 31.10% were non-families. 26.40% of all households were made up of individuals, and 11.50% had someone living alone who was 65 years of age or older. The average household size was 2.40 and the average family size was 2.88.

In the county, the population was spread out, with 24.60% under the age of 18, 5.30% from 18 to 24, 25.20% from 25 to 44, 28.50% from 45 to 64, and 16.40% who were 65 years of age or older. The median age was 42 years. For every 100 females there were 102.20 males. For every 100 females age 18 and over, there were 100.70 males.

In 2017, there were 116 births, giving a general fertility rate of 66.6 births per 1000 women aged 15–44, the 23rd highest rate out of all 72 Wisconsin counties. Additionally, there were fewer than five reported induced abortions performed on women of Bayfield County residence in 2017.

== Communities ==
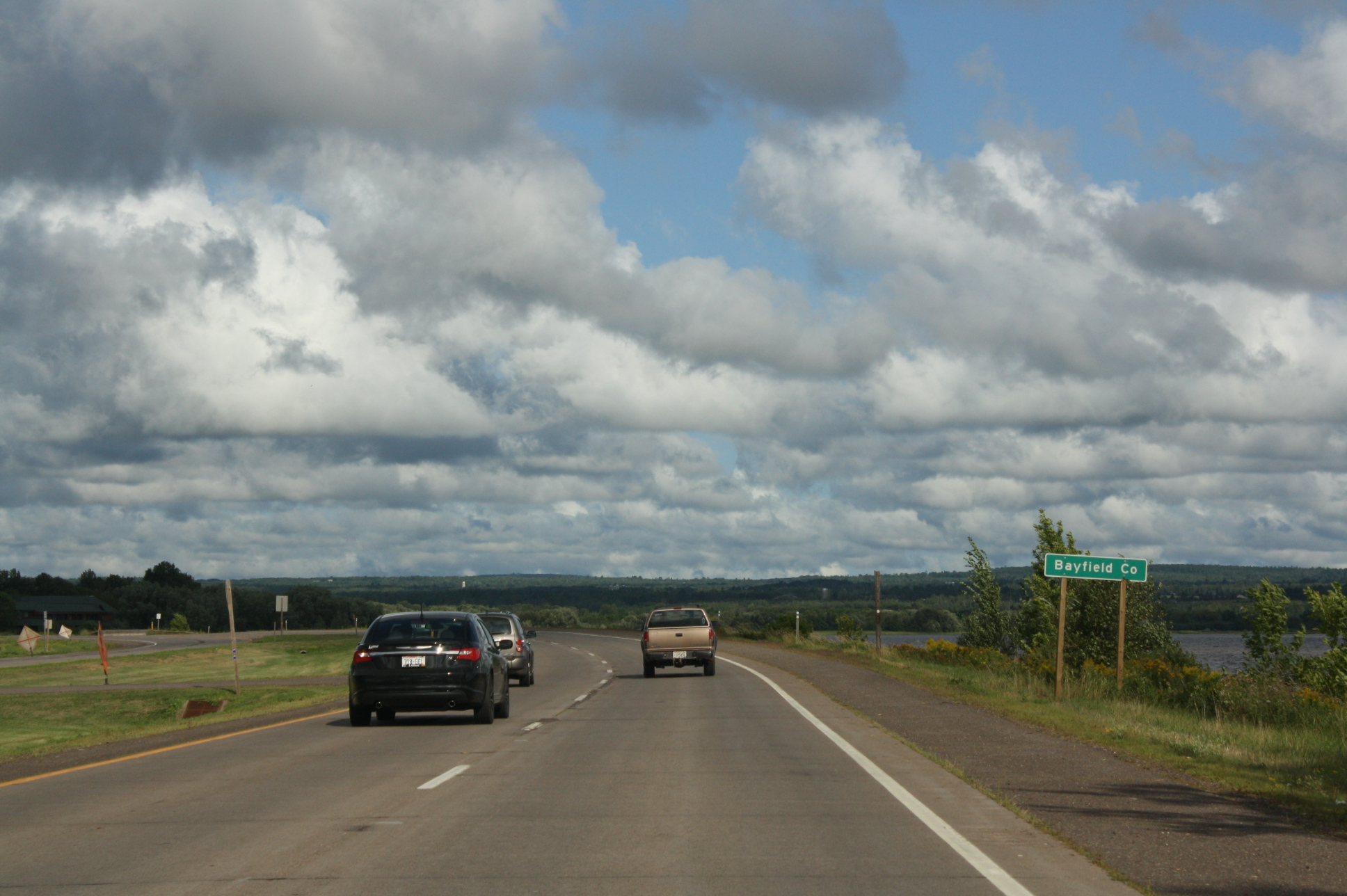
County sign on US2 / WIS13; Lake Superior is visible on the right

=== Cities ===
- Ashland (mostly in Ashland County)
- Bayfield
- Washburn (county seat)

=== Village ===
- Mason

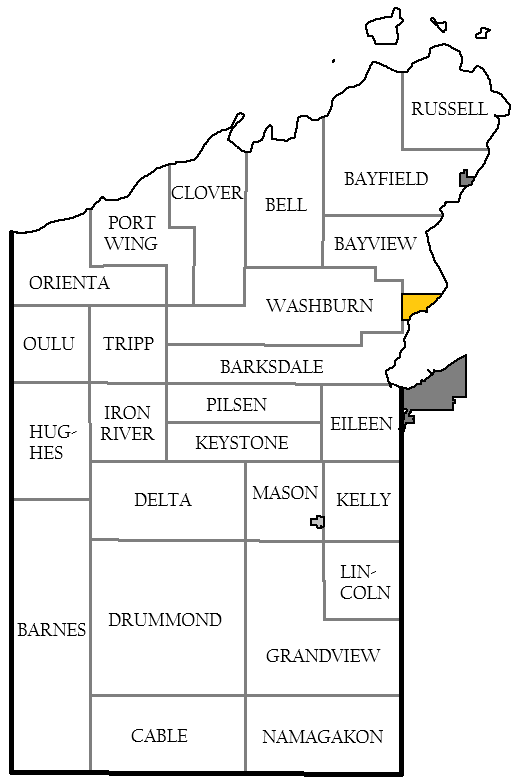
Towns of Bayfield County

=== Towns ===
- Barksdale
- Barnes
- Bayfield
- Bayview
- Bell
- Cable
- Clover
- Delta
- Drummond
- Eileen
- Grand View
- Hughes
- Iron River
- Kelly
- Keystone
- Lincoln
- Mason
- Namakagon
- Orienta
- Oulu
- Pilsen
- Port Wing
- Russell
- Tripp
- Washburn

=== Census-designated places ===
- Cable
- Cornucopia
- Drummond
- Grand View
- Herbster
- Iron River
- Port Wing

=== Unincorporated communities ===
- Ashland Junction
- Barksdale
- Bark Point
- Benoit
- Delta
- Ino
- Lake Owen
- Leonards
- Moquah
- Muskeg
- Namekagon
- Pike River
- Radspur
- Pureair
- Oulu
- Red Cliff
- Salmo
- Sand Bay
- Sioux
- Sutherland
- Topside
- Wills

== Politics ==
During the 1930s and 1940s at the state level Bayfield county was a stronghold for the Wisconsin Progressive Party - National Progressives. voting consistently for Philip La Follette during gubernatorial elections and Robert M. La Follette Jr. for senate. Today Bayfield County is a Democratic bastion, having voted for the Democrat in every presidential election since 1932 except for three nationwide Republican landslides in 1952, 1956, and 1972.

United States presidential election results for Bayfield County, Wisconsin
Year	Republican		Democratic		Third party(ies)	
Year	No.	%	No.	%	No.	%
1892	1,467	50.50%	1,349	46.44%	89	3.06%
1896	2,244	72.57%	770	24.90%	78	2.52%
1900	2,428	76.93%	632	20.03%	96	3.04%
1904	2,665	84.98%	350	11.16%	121	3.86%
1908	1,957	70.27%	579	20.79%	249	8.94%
1912	514	23.03%	666	29.84%	1,052	47.13%
1916	1,320	51.10%	996	38.56%	267	10.34%
1920	2,536	73.34%	589	17.03%	333	9.63%
1924	1,675	36.41%	205	4.46%	2,720	59.13%
1928	3,279	63.41%	1,709	33.05%	183	3.54%
1932	2,035	38.14%	2,981	55.88%	319	5.98%
1936	2,071	31.08%	4,366	65.53%	226	3.39%
1940	2,829	38.53%	4,387	59.75%	126	1.72%
1944	2,475	42.02%	3,362	57.08%	53	0.90%
1948	2,338	40.07%	3,081	52.80%	416	7.13%
1952	3,419	55.98%	2,616	42.84%	72	1.18%
1956	3,096	53.32%	2,691	46.35%	19	0.33%
1960	2,841	46.88%	3,196	52.74%	23	0.38%
1964	1,886	32.65%	3,875	67.08%	16	0.28%
1968	2,333	40.92%	3,036	53.24%	333	5.84%
1972	3,045	51.92%	2,736	46.65%	84	1.43%
1976	2,624	39.21%	3,885	58.05%	184	2.75%
1980	3,278	42.08%	3,705	47.57%	806	10.35%
1984	3,474	45.91%	4,034	53.31%	59	0.78%
1988	3,095	41.50%	4,323	57.96%	40	0.54%
1992	2,393	29.50%	3,873	47.74%	1,846	22.76%
1996	2,250	30.65%	3,895	53.07%	1,195	16.28%
2000	3,266	39.54%	4,427	53.60%	566	6.85%
2004	3,754	38.71%	5,845	60.26%	100	1.03%
2008	3,365	35.54%	5,972	63.08%	131	1.38%
2012	3,603	36.81%	6,033	61.64%	152	1.55%
2016	4,124	42.90%	4,953	51.53%	535	5.57%
2020	4,617	42.44%	6,147	56.50%	116	1.07%
2024	4,860	43.24%	6,107	54.33%	273	2.43%

== See also ==
- Lake Namakagon
- National Register of Historic Places listings in Bayfield County, Wisconsin
- Red Cliff Band of Lake Superior Chippewa
- USS Bayfield (APA-33)
- List of counties in Wisconsin
