= Whittlesey (disambiguation) =

Whittlesey (historically known as Whittlesea or Witesie) is an ancient Fenland market town east of Peterborough, in the Fenland district of Cambridgeshire in England.

Whittlesey may also refer to:

== People ==
- Abigail Goodrich Whittlesey (1788–1858), American educator, publisher, editor
- Asaph Whittlesey (1826-1879), American state representative from Wisconsin and first settler of Ashland, Wisconsin
- Charles Whittlesey, a number of people with the name
  - Charles Whittlesey (geologist) (1808–1886), American geologist and archeologist
    - Whittlesey culture, an obsolete group of indigenous people named after the geologist
  - Charles Frederick Whittlesey (1867–1941), American architect
  - Charles White Whittlesey (1884–c. 1921), American soldier
  - Charles Whittlesey (lawyer) (1819-1874), Connecticut lawyer, Union Soldier and briefly Virginia Attorney General
- Elisha Whittlesey (1783–1863), American lawyer, civil servant and U.S. Representative from Ohio
- Faith Whittlesey (1939–2018), American politician and White House Senior Staff member
- Julian Whittlesey (1905–1995), American architect
- Samuel Whittlesey Dana (1760–1830), American lawyer and politician
- Sarah J. C. Whittlesey (1824–1896), American author, poet, hymn writer
- William Whittlesey (disambiguation), a number of people with the name
  - William Whittlesey, a 14th-century archbishop of Canterbury.
  - William A. Whittlesey (1796–1866), American politician, U.S. Representative from Ohio

Fictional characters

- Diane Whittlesey, a fictional character played by Edie Falco on the television program Oz

== Places ==
- Whittlesey Creek, a creek in northern Wisconsin
- Whittlesey Creek National Wildlife Refuge, a federally managed wetland complex in northern Wisconsin on the shore of Lake Superior
- Lake Whittlesey, a proglacial lake that was an ancestor of present-day Lake Erie.
- Whittlesey Mere, was an area of open water in the Fenland area of the county of Huntingdonshire (now Cambridgeshire), England
- Whittlesey Museum, a social history museum located on the ground floor of the early 19th century Town Hall in Whittlesey, Cambridgeshire, UK
- Whittlesey Rural District, a rural district in the Isle of Ely from 1894 to 1926

== Others ==
- Whittlesey Athletic F.C., a football club based in Whittlesey, Cambridgeshire, England
- Whittlesey House, a former publishing imprint of McGraw Hill

== See also ==
- Whittlesea (disambiguation)
