= Lake Superior Sounder =

Wisconsin newspaper

The Lake Superior Sounder was a newspaper published in Ashland, WI, with its inaugural issue released in January 2003. Unlike the other Ashland newspaper (The Ashland Daily Press), The Sounder focused less on hard news, and more on the leisure aspects of life in northern Wisconsin. It served the counties of Sawyer, Bayfield, Ashland and Iron for five years, published every other Thursday and available throughout Wisconsin's Lake Superior region.

The Sounder discontinued publication in January 2008.
