= Whittlesey Creek =

River in northern Wisconsin

- Location within Wisconsin Location within the United States

Location
- Country: United States
- State: Wisconsin

Physical characteristics
- Source
  - location: northeast of Moquah
  - coordinates: 46.6152193°N 91.041855°W
- Mouth: Lake Superior
  - location: north of Ashland Junction
  - coordinates: 46.5988313°N 90.9493545°W
  - elevation: 600 ft (180 m)

Basin features
- Tributaries
  - left: North Fork Whittlesey Creek

Whittlesey Creek is a creek that flows through Bayfield County, Wisconsin. The source of the creek is northeast of Moquah and flows into Lake Superior north of Ashland Junction. As of 2010, 329 acres (1.33 km^{2}) of land in the watershed belong to the Whittlesey Creek National Wildlife Refuge. The creek is named after Asaph Whittlesey, who was the first settler of Ashland and a member of the Wisconsin State Assembly.

== See also ==
List of rivers of Wisconsin
