= Book Across the Bay =

Cross country ski and snowshoe race in Wisconsin, United States

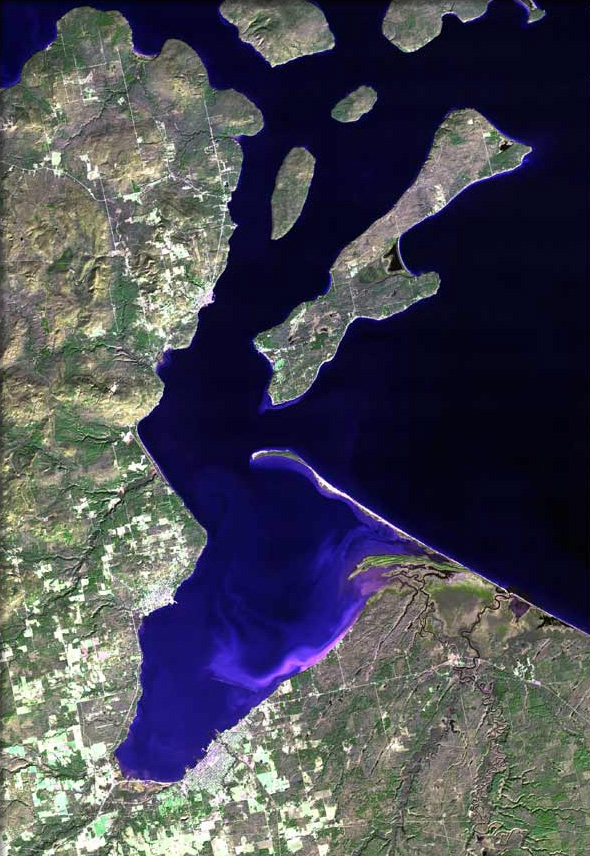
Satellite image of Chequamegon Bay, location of the event.

The Book Across the Bay is an annual winter 10-kilometer (6-mile) cross-country ski and snowshoe race held every February in northwestern Wisconsin.

The course, which is groomed for both classic-style and skate skiing, starts in Ashland, and ends in nearby Washburn. It is a unique winter event, because it follows a route not on land, but over the frozen surface of Lake Superior, the world's largest fresh water lake. The event is held at night, and the course is lit by the stars above and up to 1,000 candles in ice luminaries that line the entire route.

== History ==
The race was first organized and held in 1996, as a fundraiser for the Washburn Public Library, and the Tri-County Medical Society.

The initial idea of a small "ski-race fundraiser" turned out to be very successful and popular, as was evident during the first year. An initial estimate of 100 skiers in 1996 was not only met, but far exceeded with a final count of over 350 participants during its first year. And attendance has steadily increased every year since, with over 3,800 participants in 2011. From 1996 to 2012, the Book Across the Bay events have drawn a total of nearly 24,000 participants.

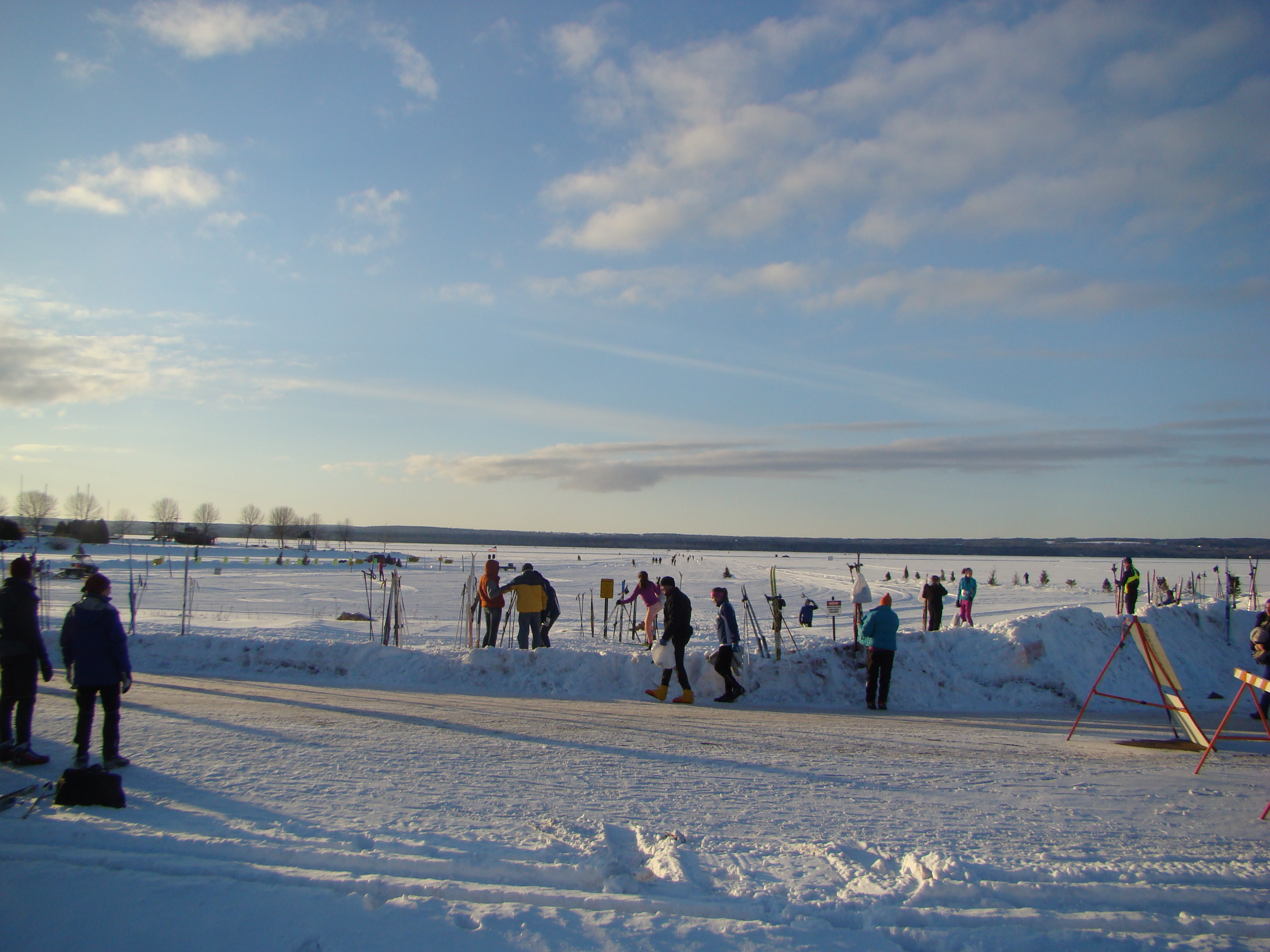
The starting point of the race

The event is entirely volunteer-driven. Many individuals, businesses, and organizations contribute time, talent, supplies and more to make the Book Across the Bay a success.

The name of the event is a double entendre. The term "to book" is a slang term for running or traveling very fast on foot. Thus, the obvious meaning of the Book Across the Bay, is a type of race across a bay. But the word "Book" was also used as a pun in the title because it was initially organized as a fundraiser for the public library.

In 2006, the board that governs the race formed a non-profit corporation because of the increased financial responsibility that putting on the event required. That non-profit, which oversees all aspects of the event is named Book Across the Bay, Inc.

== Community grants ==
The race proceeds are distributed back to the local community through the race's Community Grants Program, which assists area organizations dedicated to enhancing the physical and mental well being of regional residents throughout the local Chequamegon Bay area.

The Community Grants Program was begun in 2005 in keeping with the race's philosophy of health, wellness and community participation. From 1996 through 2012, the race has made total donations of more than $122,000 to benefit educational, health and safety programs in the local region.
