= WBSZ =

Radio station in Ashland, Wisconsin

- Ashland, Wisconsin; United States
- Frequency: 93.3 MHz
- Branding: Todays Country Z93

Programming
- Format: Country
- Affiliations: ABC Radio, Westwood One

Ownership
- Owner: Heartland Communications Group, LLC
- Sister stations: WATW, WJJH, WNXR

History
- First air date: July 25, 1994

Technical information
- Licensing authority: FCC
- Facility ID: 24084
- Class: C1
- ERP: 71,000 watts
- HAAT: 75 meters
- Transmitter coordinates: 46°34′25.00″N 90°51′56.00″W

Links
- Public license information: Public file; LMS
- Webcast: Listen Live
- Website: www.wbszfm.com

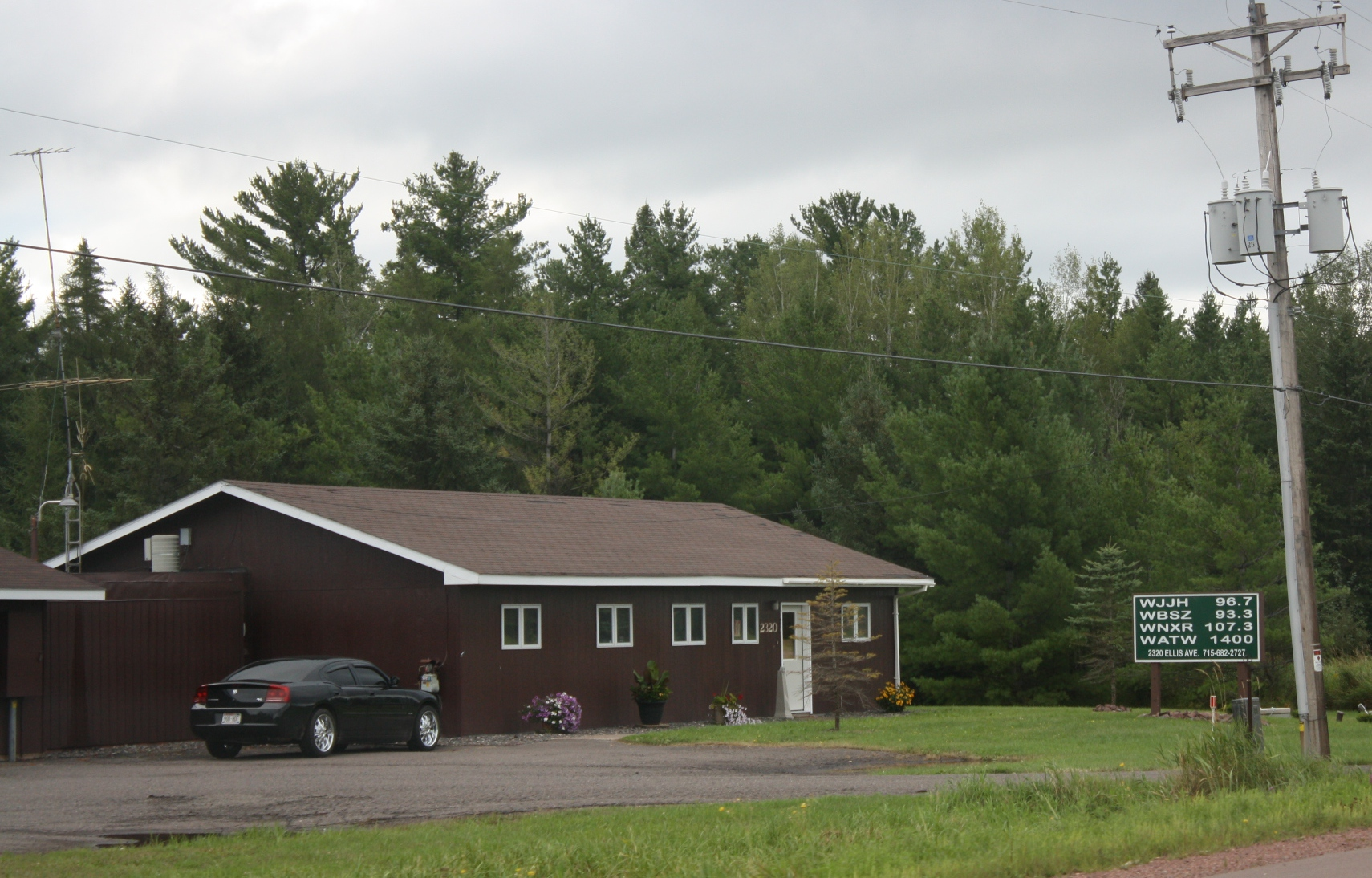
Studios

WBSZ (93.3 FM) is a radio station broadcasting a ""New Country" format, licensed to Ashland, Wisconsin, United States. The station is currently owned by Heartland Communications Group, LLC, and features programming from ABC Radio and Westwood One. It serves Ashland and Bayfield counties.

Its studios and transmitter are located at 2320 Ellis Avenue in Ashland, along with its sister stations.
