= Ashland Union Station =

Ashland
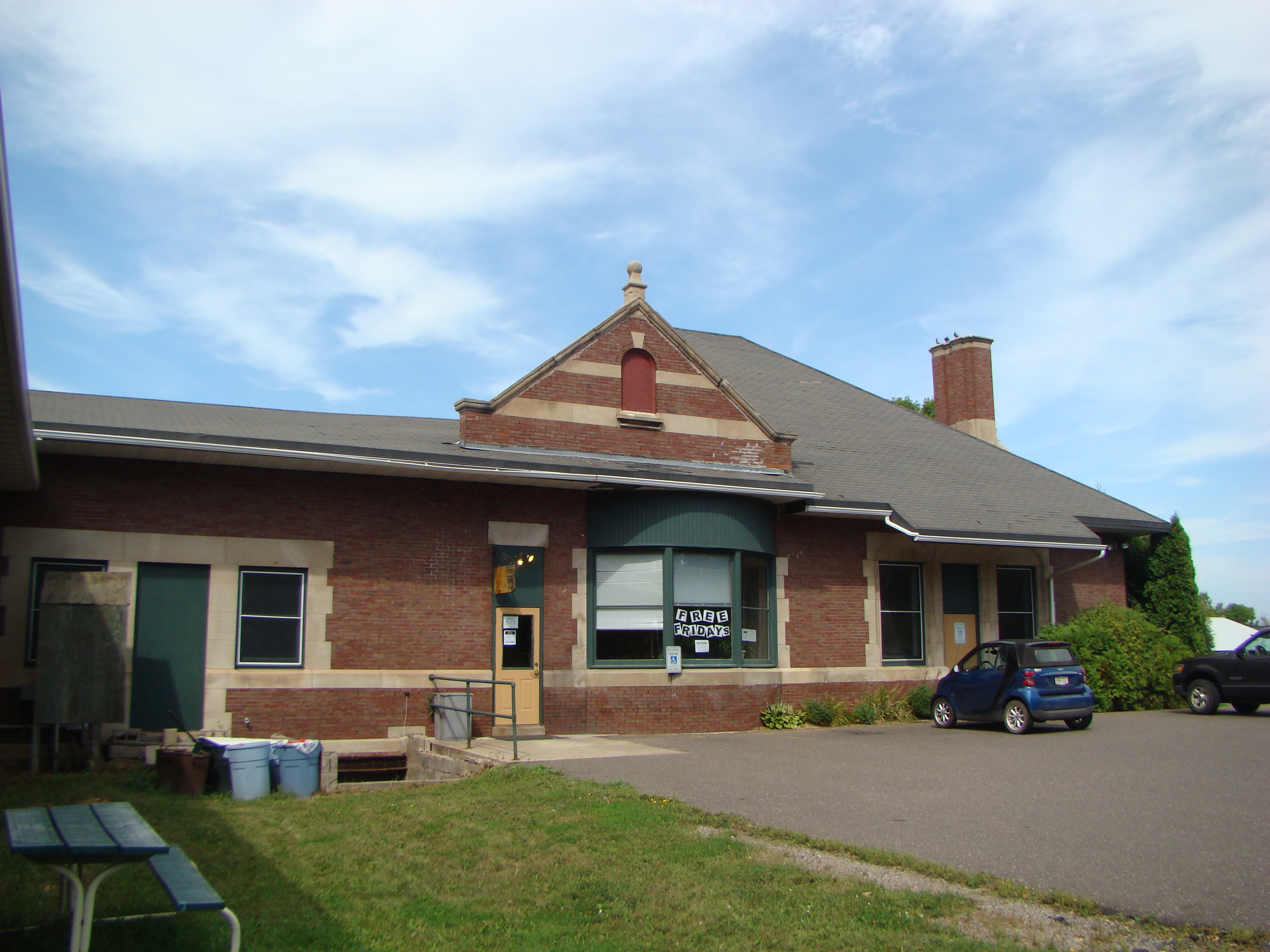
- Union Depot

General information
- Location: 417 Chapple Ave., Ashland, Wisconsin
- Coordinates: 46°35′8.5″N 90°53′21″W
- System: Former Chicago and North Western Railway station

Construction
- Architect: Charles Sumner Frost
- Architectural style: Queen Anne

History
- Opened: 1900

Services
Preceding station	Chicago and North Western Railway	Following station
Terminus	Ashland – Green Bay	Odanah toward Green Bay
Ashland Junction toward Minneapolis	Minneapolis – Ashland	Terminus
Ashland Junction toward Bayfield	Bayfield – Ashland	Terminus
- Union Depot
- U.S. National Register of Historic Places
- Location within Wisconsin Location within the United States
- Location: 417 Chapple Ave., Ashland, Wisconsin
- Coordinates: 46°35′8.5″N 90°53′21″W
- Area: less than one acre
- Built: 1900
- Architect: Charles Sumner Frost
- Architectural style: Queen Anne
- NRHP reference No.: 79000058
- Added to NRHP: March 23, 1979
Location

The Union Depot in Ashland, Wisconsin, United States, was listed on the National Register of Historic Places in 1979. It has also been known as the Ashland Depot.

It is a red brick building with stone belt courses, quoins, and other details.

The depot was designed by Charles Sumner Frost and was used by the Chicago and North Western Railway and its subsidiary, the Chicago, St. Paul, Minneapolis and Omaha Railway (Omaha Road), for the Flambeau 400 service to Chicago. More recently, the building has been utilized as a fitness center and the train tracks converted into an exercise trail.
