= Old Ashland Post Office =

- U.S. National Register of Historic Places
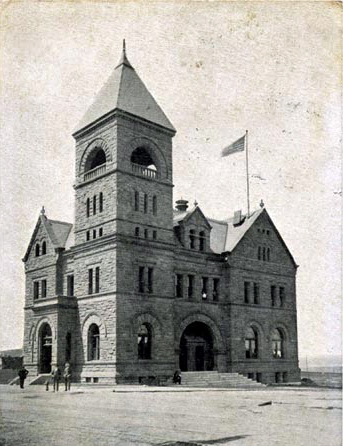
- Old Ashland Post Office

- Location within Wisconsin Location within the United States
- Interactive map showing the location of Ashland City Hall
- Location: 600 West Second St. Ashland, Wisconsin
- Coordinates: 46°35′20″N 90°53′23.5″W
- Built: 1892
- Architect: Willoughby J. Edbrooke
- Architectural style: Romanesque
- NRHP reference No.: 74000054
- Added to NRHP: January 21, 1974

The Old Ashland Post Office is a historic building in Ashland, Wisconsin, United States. It now serves as the Ashland City Hall, which is what most people know it as, and refer to it as. It houses the offices of city government.

It was designed by the noted federal architect Willoughby J. Edbrooke, and constructed in 1892-93 under the supervision of local architect H.P. Padley. The building was added to the National Register of Historic Places in 1974 for its architectural significance. The building is designed in the Richardsonian Romanesque architectural style, and constructed entirely of brownstone.

The building is of special historic interest, and is a contributing resource within the West Second Street Historic District, of downtown Ashland. It is the tallest building in the Historic District, and one of the best local examples of fine architecture.

The monumental three-story building features a prominent four-story tower, with a pyramidal-shaped roof. The tower no longer contains its bell, although the original bell still exists and is owned by the city, but kept in storage.

The first story windows have brownstone voussoirs, and archivolt moldings. The second story windows are rectangular, and the third story windows and tower openings are arched at the top. The main entrance has a large foliated arch supported by clusters of short columns, all in the Richardsonian Romanesque style. A very old flat-roofed addition on the back (north) side is made of matching materials, and matches the exact style. This addition houses the present-day City Council meeting room.

A highlight of the interior is a fine oak staircase, which leads to each floor, and up to the tower. The stairwell also has paneled wainscoting, which has been nicely restored.

The building was made with locally quarried Apostle Island brownstone of excellent quality. However, there are signs of deterioration due to recent sand-blasting that occurred while the building, once a vocational school, was renovated for use as the City Hall. In the 2010s, the building was made handicap accessible, with a new ramp on the west side.

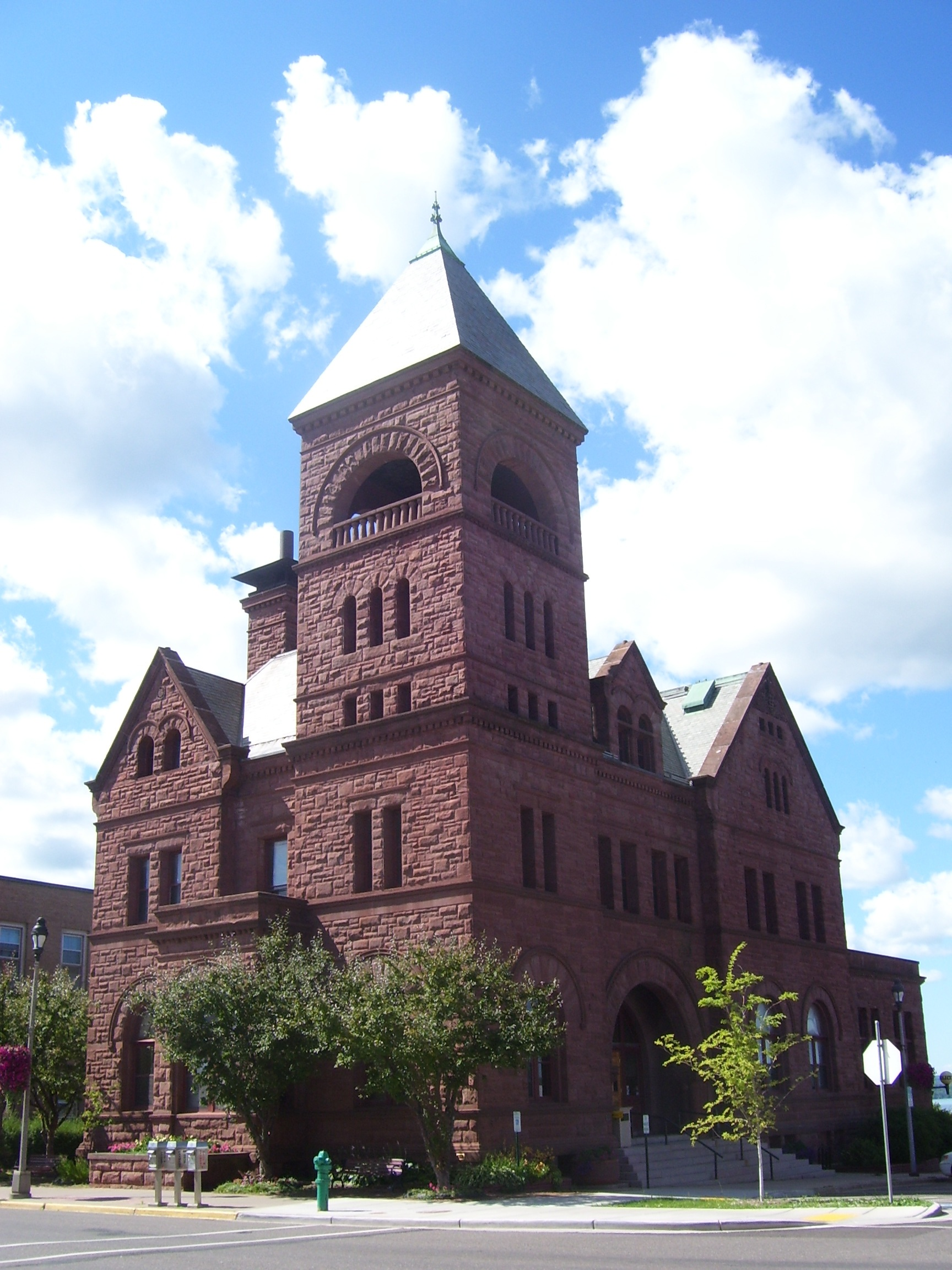
Current photo

== See also ==
National Register of Historic Places listings in Ashland County, Wisconsin
