= Whittlesey Creek National Wildlife Refuge =

National Wildlife Refuge and coastal wetlands in Bayfield County, Wisconsin

- IUCN category IV (habitat/species management area)
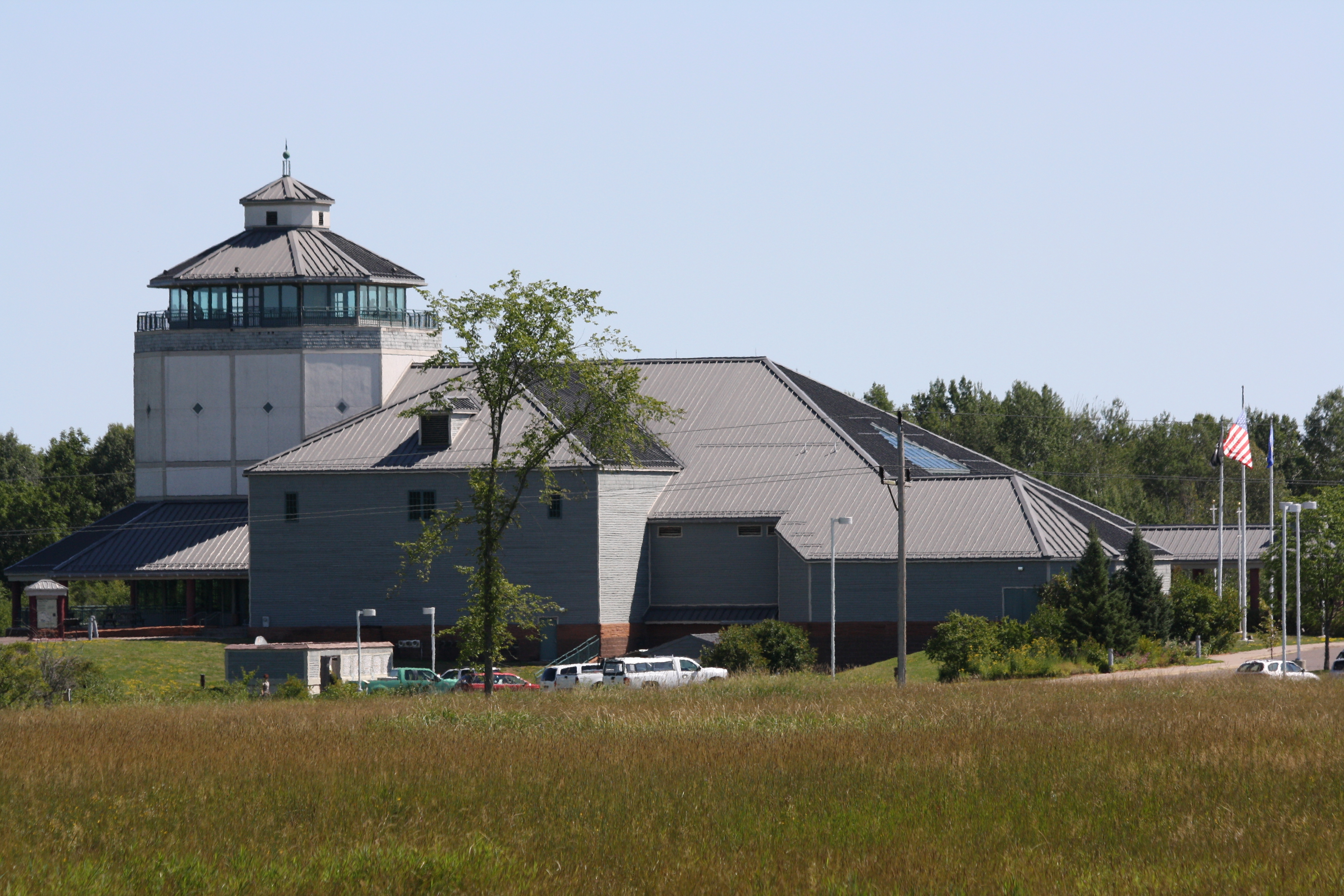
- Northern Great Lakes Visitor Center

- Location within Wisconsin Location within the United States
- Location: Barksdale, Bayfield County, Wisconsin, United States
- Nearest city: Ashland, Wisconsin
- Coordinates: 46.5921°N 90.962°W
- Area: 329 acres (1.33 km^{2})
- Established: 1999
- Governing body: U.S. Fish and Wildlife Service
- Website: Whittlesey Creek National Wildlife Refuge

Whittlesey Creek National Wildlife Refuge is part of a large wetland complex on Lake Superior, near Ashland, Wisconsin. These coastal wetlands are a significant part of the wildlife habitat and aquatic resources of the south shore of Lake Superior.

The refuge was established in 1999, and it is still being created. Its purpose is to protect, restore, and manage coastal wetland and spring-fed stream habitat. Up to 540 acres (2.2 km^{2}) of coastal wetland in the Whittlesey Creek watershed will be acquired, and up to 1,260 acres (5.1 km^{2}) will be protected through conservation easements. As of 2010, 329 acres (1.33 km^{2}) are protected.

Restoration of coaster brook trout, a potamodromous fish native to Lake Superior, is one of the refuge goals. The refuge will also restore stream and wetland habitat to benefit other fish species and migratory birds.

The refuge is located immediately north of the Northern Great Lakes Visitor Center, which is operated by the U.S. Fish and Wildlife Service, U.S. Forest Service, National Park Service, Wisconsin State Historical Society, University of Wisconsin Extension Service, and Friends of the Center Alliance, Ltd. The Center serves as the headquarters and contact station for the refuge.

== See also ==
- Asaph Whittlesey
