= WhistleStop Marathon =

Annual road running competition in Wisconsin, USA

The WhistleStop Marathon and Half Marathon is an annual road running competition held in October in Ashland, Wisconsin, in the United States. The course runs point-to-point and is held on the Tri-County Corridor, a rail-trail now paved with limestone gravel. The course stretches from two miles east of Iron River, Wisconsin and features ten re-decked railroad trestles, wetlands, trout streams, Chequamegon National Forest woodlands, dairy farms, and residential neighborhoods. The finish is located near Ashland's Bay Area Civic Center. The WhistleStop Marathon is USATF certified (#WI98019WG).

The WhistleStop Marathon and Half Marathon was first run in 1997. In 2006 the marathon accommodated 600 runners while the half marathon accommodated 1,000 runners.

== Course records ==
The female record time for the WhistleStop Marathon is 2:47:19, set in 2012 by St. Louis Park, Minnesota runner Jenelle Deatherage. The male record time for the WhistleStop Marathon is 2:28:41, set in 2007 by Duluth, Minnesota runner Eric Hartmark.

The female record time for the WhistleStop Half Marathon is 1:18:32, set in 2022 by Maria Langholz. The male record time for the WhistleStop Half Marathon is 1:08:36, set in 2006 by Minot, North Dakota runner Abraham Wengel.
