= Ashland Junction, Wisconsin =

- unincorporated community
- Location within Wisconsin Location within the United States
- Coordinates: 46°34′26″N 90°58′17″W
- Country: United States
- State: Wisconsin
- County: Bayfield
- Town: Eileen
- Elevation: 653 ft (199 m)
- Time zone: UTC-6 (Central (CST))
  - Summer (DST): UTC-5 (CDT)
- Area codes: 715 and 534
- GNIS feature ID: 1577496

Ashland Junction is an unincorporated community located in the town of Eileen, Bayfield County, Wisconsin, United States.

== History ==
Ashland Junction was founded in 1883. The community was named from its location at a rail junction outside of Ashland. This junction was between lines of the Omaha Road (later Chicago and North Western Railroad, or C&NW), and the Northern Pacific Railroad. The right-of-way of the east-west lines are now used for a rail trail known as the Tri-County Corridor.

A post office called Ashland Junction was established in 1890, and remained in operation until it was discontinued in 1910.

== Notes ==
Preceding station	Chicago and North Western Railway	Following station
Benoit toward Minneapolis	Minneapolis – Ashland	Ashland Terminus
Barksdale toward Bayfield	Bayfield – Ashland	Ashland Terminus
Preceding station	Northern Pacific Railway	Following station
Moquah toward Duluth	Duluth – Ashland	Ashland Terminus
