= WATW =

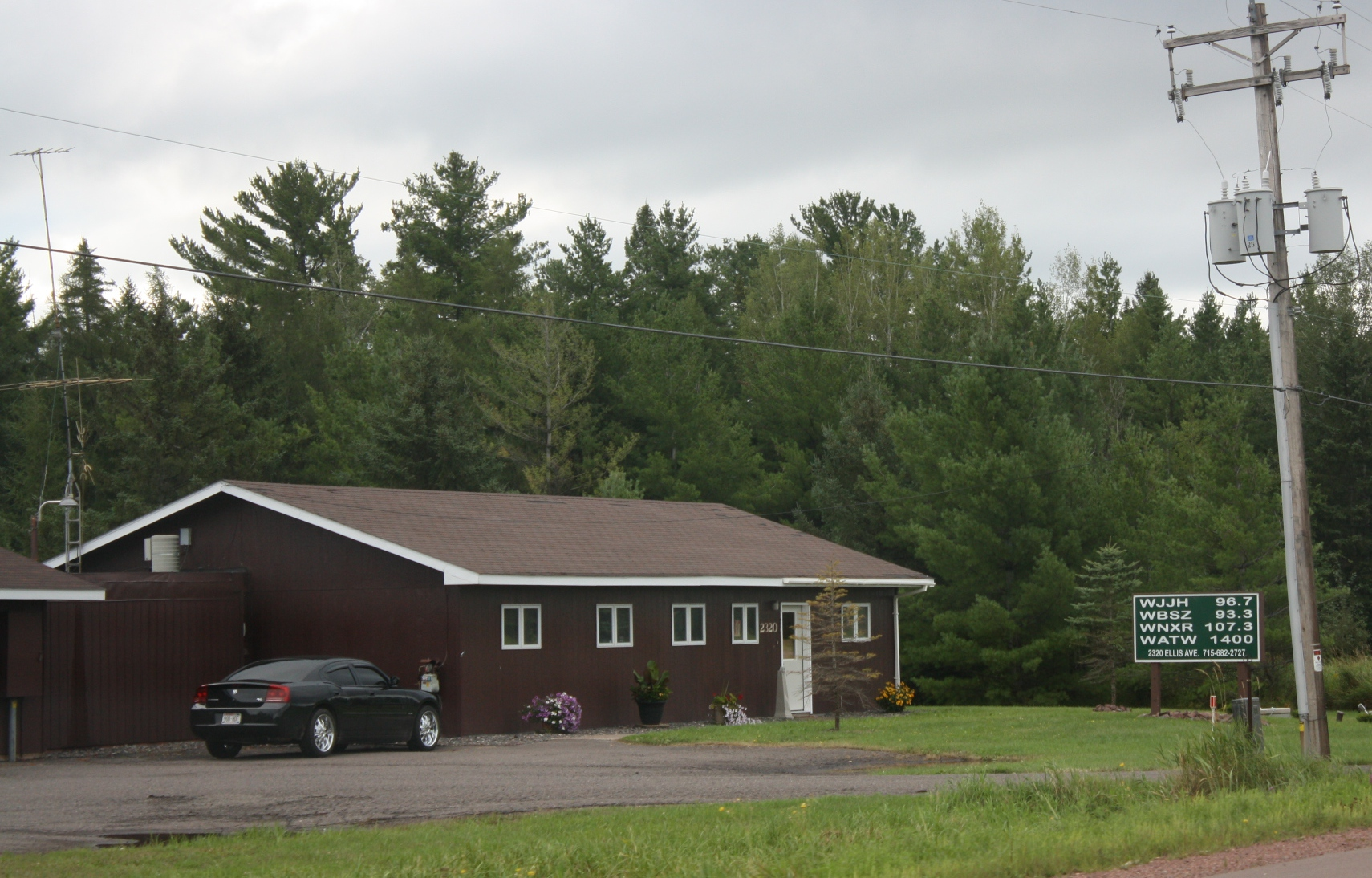
- WATW's studios in Ashland
- Ashland, Wisconsin; United States
- Broadcast area: Ashland, Wisconsin
- Frequency: 1400 kHz
- Branding: Bay Country 101.3

Programming
- Format: Classic country

Ownership
- Owner: Heartland Communications Group, LLC
- Sister stations: WBSZ, WJJH, WNXR

History
- First air date: May 1, 1940
- Call sign meaning: "Ashland Tops Wisconsin" or "At The Water"

Technical information
- Licensing authority: FCC
- Facility ID: 4078
- Class: C
- Power: 780 watts (unlimited)
- Transmitter coordinates: 46°34′25.00″N 90°51′56.00″W
- Translator: 101.3 W267CS (Ashland)

Links
- Public license information: Public file; LMS
- Webcast: Listen live
- Website: watwbaycountry.com

WATW (1400 AM) is a radio station broadcasting a classic country music format under the branding "Bay Country 101.3," formerly broadcasting a conservative news and talk radio show under the branding "Freedom Talk 1400." Licensed to Ashland, Wisconsin, United States, the station is currently owned by Heartland Communications Group, LLC. It serves Ashland and Bayfield counties. The AM signal is simulcast on FM translator W267CS at 101.3 MHz, which serves the city of Ashland.

Its studios and transmitter are housed at 2320 Ellis Avenue in Ashland, with its local sister stations. The station is currently owned by Heartland Communications Group, LLC, which operates a cluster of stations in the Ashland and Iron River markets. Heartland acquired the station as part of a strategic cluster build-out to dominate the local advertising market in Ashland and Bayfield counties. It is a long-standing affiliate of the Brewers Radio Network, carrying Milwaukee Brewers baseball games throughout the season.. Additionally, the station provides coverage for the Green Bay Packers Radio Network, Wisconsin Badgers athletics, and local high school sports.

== History ==
WATW began its broadcasting service on May 1, 1940. The station's call sign has various local interpretations, with some citing it as an acronym for "Ashland Tops Wisconsin" or "At The Water," a nod to its location on the shores of Lake Superior. As one of the oldest heritage signals in the Northwoods, it has served as the flagship for several regional news and sports networks for over 85 years. For several years, WATW operated with a conservative news/talk format branded as "Freedom Talk 1400," featuring nationally syndicated hosts such as Rush Limbaugh and Sean Hannity. In November 2019, the station dropped the talk format in favor of classic country music, rebranding as "Bay Country 101.3".
