= Chapple and MacArthur Avenues Residential Historic District =

- U.S. National Register of Historic Places
- U.S. Historic district
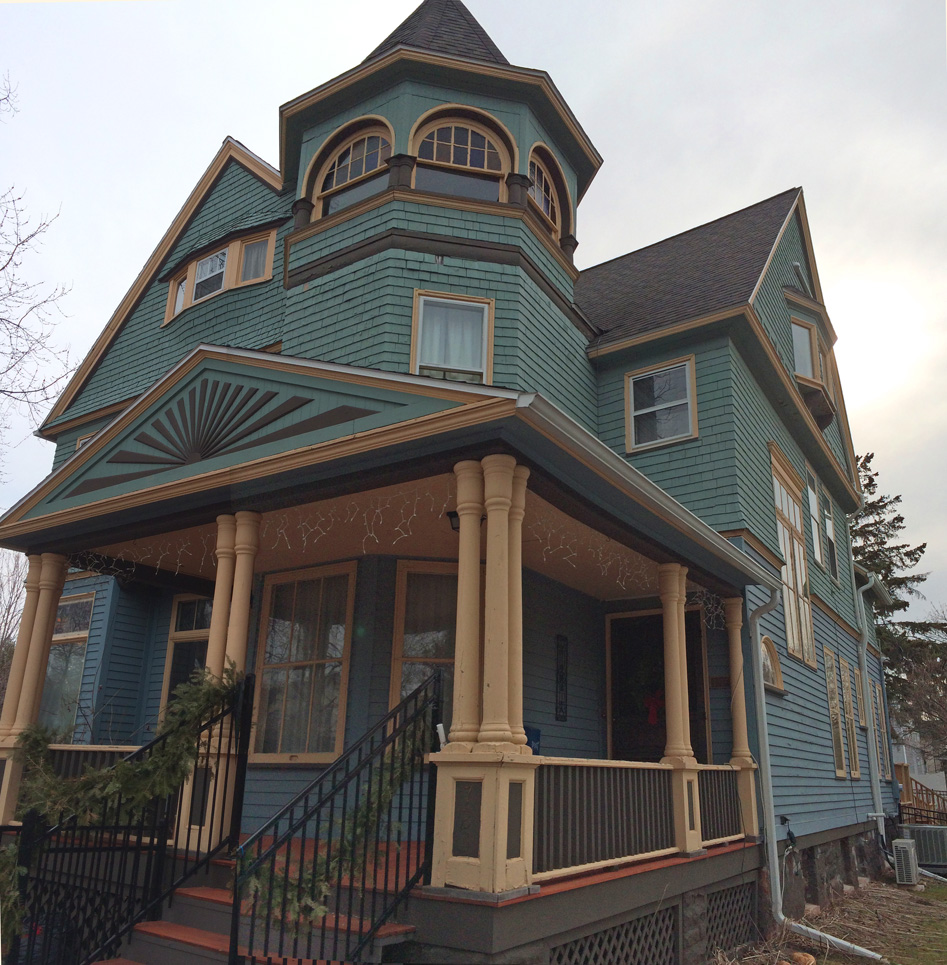
- A residence on Chapple Avenue that contributs to the District.
- Location: 507-1023 Chapple, 600-810, 814 & 822 MacArthur Avenue, 618-622, 700-722 9th Avenue West, 706-721 6th Street West, Ashland, Wisconsin
- Built: 1872-1930s
- NRHP reference No.: 14000266
- Added to NRHP: May 27, 2014

The Chapple and MacArthur Avenues Residential Historic District is a residential neighborhood and Historic District in Ashland, Wisconsin, and is listed on the National Register of Historic Places.

It comprises 61 contributing properties, including the 1888 Shingle-style Heydlauff house, the 1891 Queen Anne/Shingle-style Charles Lamoreux house (at left), the 1893 Gothic Revival Swedish Evangelical Lutheran Church, the 1894 Stick style Lyon house, the 1904 American Foursquare Parish house, the 1911 Craftsman Frank Lamoreux house, the 1924 Dutch Colonial Revival Garnich house, and the 1933 Georgian Revival Metternich house.

There is another Historic District listed on the National Register of Historic Places in Ashland, the West Second Street Historic District. Ashland also has a local register of historic properties, which identifies buildings that are significant to local history.

== See also ==
- National Register of Historic Places listings in Ashland County, Wisconsin
