= WJJH =

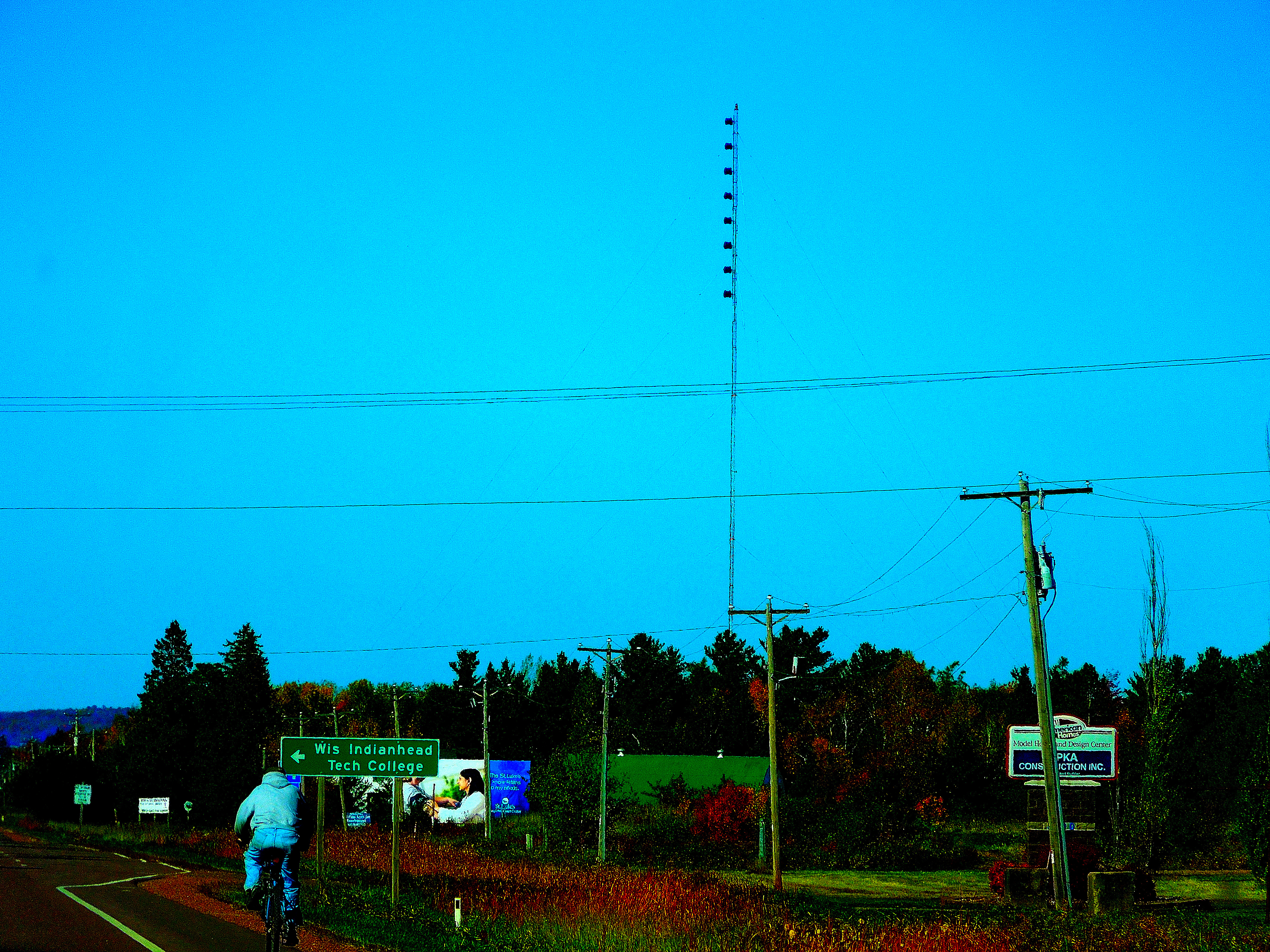
- WJJH's transmitter
- Ashland, Wisconsin; United States
- Frequency: 96.7 MHz
- Branding: Real Rock J96

Programming
- Format: Classic rock
- Affiliations: ABC News Radio, CBS Radio, Westwood One

Ownership
- Owner: Heartland Communications Group, LLC
- Sister stations: WATW, WBSZ, WNXR

History
- First air date: 1970
- Former call signs: WATW-FM (1970–1985)
- Call sign meaning: Jerry James Hackman

Technical information
- Licensing authority: FCC
- Facility ID: 4074
- Class: C2
- ERP: 50,000 watts
- HAAT: 75 meters (246 ft)
- Transmitter coordinates: 46°34′25.00″N 90°51′56.00″W

Links
- Public license information: Public file; LMS
- Webcast: Listen live
- Website: wjjhfm.com

WJJH (96.7 FM) is an commercial radio station licensed to Ashland, Wisconsin, United States. Owned by Heartland Communications, LLC, it broadcasts a classic rock format as "Real Rock J96.", featuring programming from ABC Radio, CBS Radio and Westwood One. It serves Ashland and Bayfield counties.

Studio and transmitter are located at 2320 Ellis Avenue in Ashland, with its local sister stations.

== History ==
The station was assigned the call sign WATW-FM on December 6, 1982. On January 16, 1985, the station changed its call sign to the current WJJH. Prior to the July 2017 change to classic rock, its previous format was active rock; before the 2010 change to active rock, its previous format was satellite-based classic rock.
