= West Second Street Historic District (Ashland, Wisconsin) =

Historic district in Wisconsin, United States

- U.S. National Register of Historic Places
- U.S. Historic district
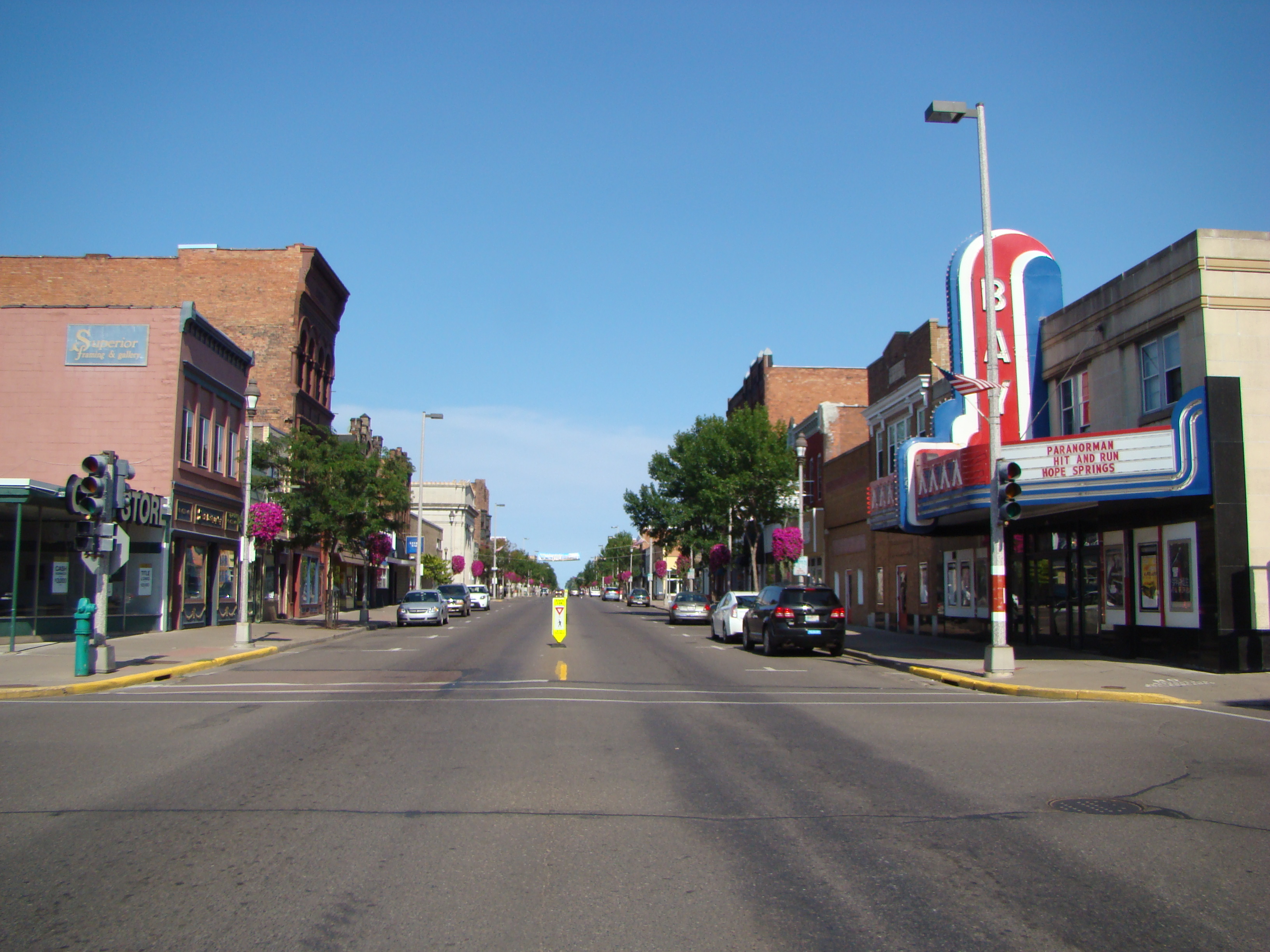
- Looking east at the historic district, from the corner of Main Street and Vaughn Avenue
- Location: Main Street West, extending from Ellis Avenue to Sixth Avenue West, Ashland, Wisconsin
- Built: 1884-1937
- NRHP reference No.: 84003619
- Added to NRHP: February 2, 1984

The West Second Street Historic District is located along a primary commercial street in Ashland, Wisconsin, and is listed on the National Register of Historic Places. West Second Street was later renamed Main Street West.

There are 45 contributing commercial buildings built from 1884 to 1937. There is a variety of architectural styles represented by the contributing buildings, such as the Richardsonian Romanesque design of the Old Ashland Post Office, or the Neoclassical design of the Ashland County Courthouse, or the Art Deco design of the Bay Theater.

Today, the district continues to be an important center of commerce for the community. Many buildings still serve the same purpose they were built for, such as the Vaughn Public Library, and the Courthouse. Other buildings have been repurposed, such as the Security Savings Bank, while some are awaiting redevelopment, such as the Royal Theatre, and the Grand Opera House.

There is another Historic District listed on the National Register of Historic Places in Ashland, the Chapple and MacArthur Avenues Residential Historic District. Ashland has a local register of historic properties, which identifies buildings that are significant to local history.

== See also ==
- National Register of Historic Places listings in Ashland County, Wisconsin
