= Ashland County Courthouse (Wisconsin) =

- U.S. National Register of Historic Places
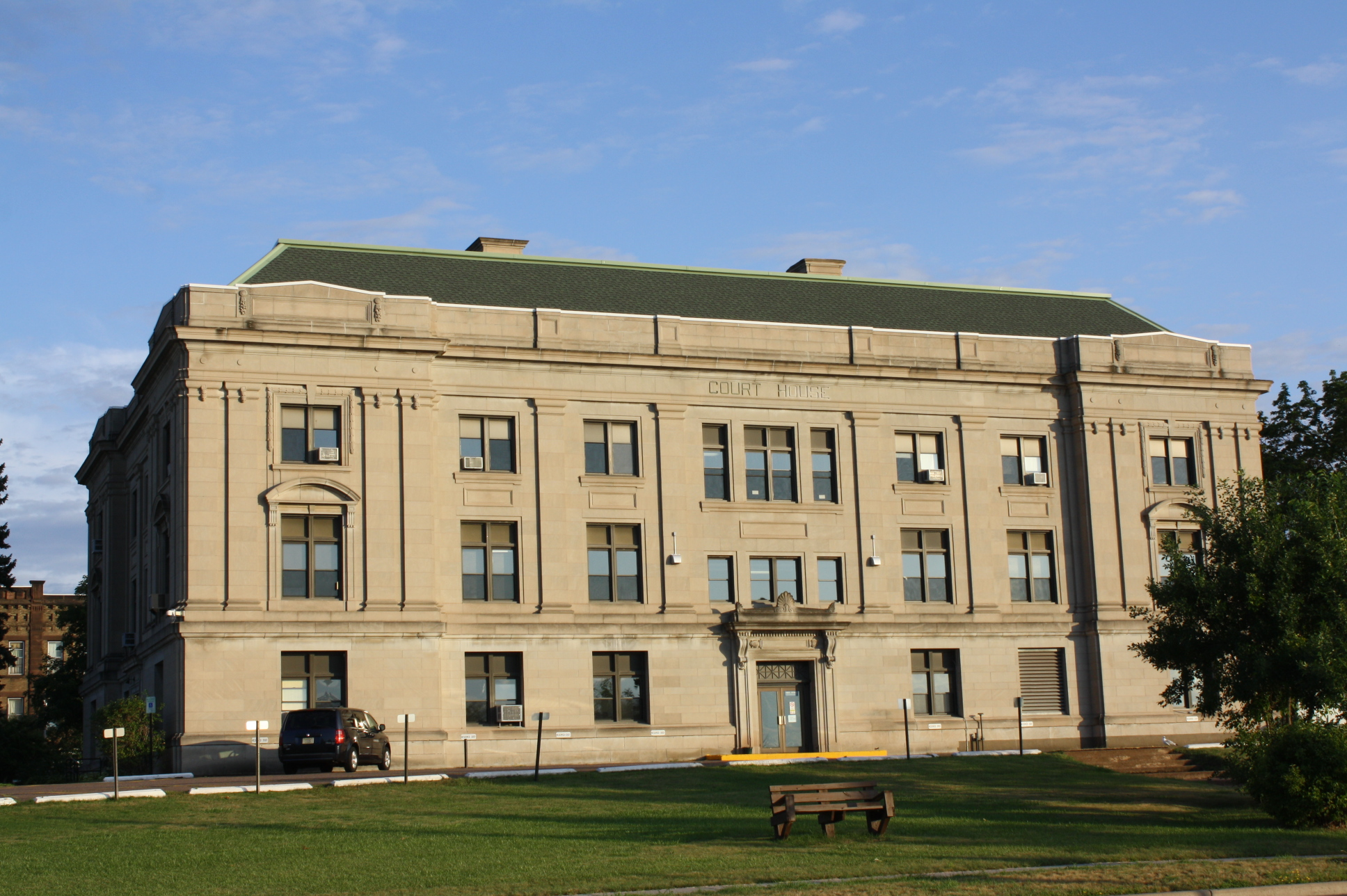

- Location within Wisconsin Location within the United States
- Interactive map showing the location of Ashland County Courthouse
- Location: 201 West Main Street; Ashland, Wisconsin
- Coordinates: 46.59108°N 90.88551°W
- Built: 1915
- MPS: County Courthouses of Wisconsin TR
- NRHP reference No.: 82000628
- Added to NRHP: March 9, 1982

The Ashland County Courthouse is a courthouse in Ashland, Wisconsin. In 1982, it was added to the National Register of Historic Places. It was designed by Henry Wildhagen and H. W. Buemming, and is noted for its Classical Revival and Beaux-Arts architecture.

The granite building was built in 1915, and occupies an entire block. The front lawn is the largest green space in the West Second Street Historic District.

The courthouse sits on the site of the first location of the original Hotel Chequamegon. The original Hotel Chequamegon was destroyed by a fire, and the block was then used for the new courthouse in 1915. Subsequently, the current Hotel Chequamegon was rebuilt in the 1980s, on the northwest corner of Ellis Avenue and Highway 2.

Much of the original interior remains intact, such as the marble floor, and elaborate central staircase.

== Image(s) ==
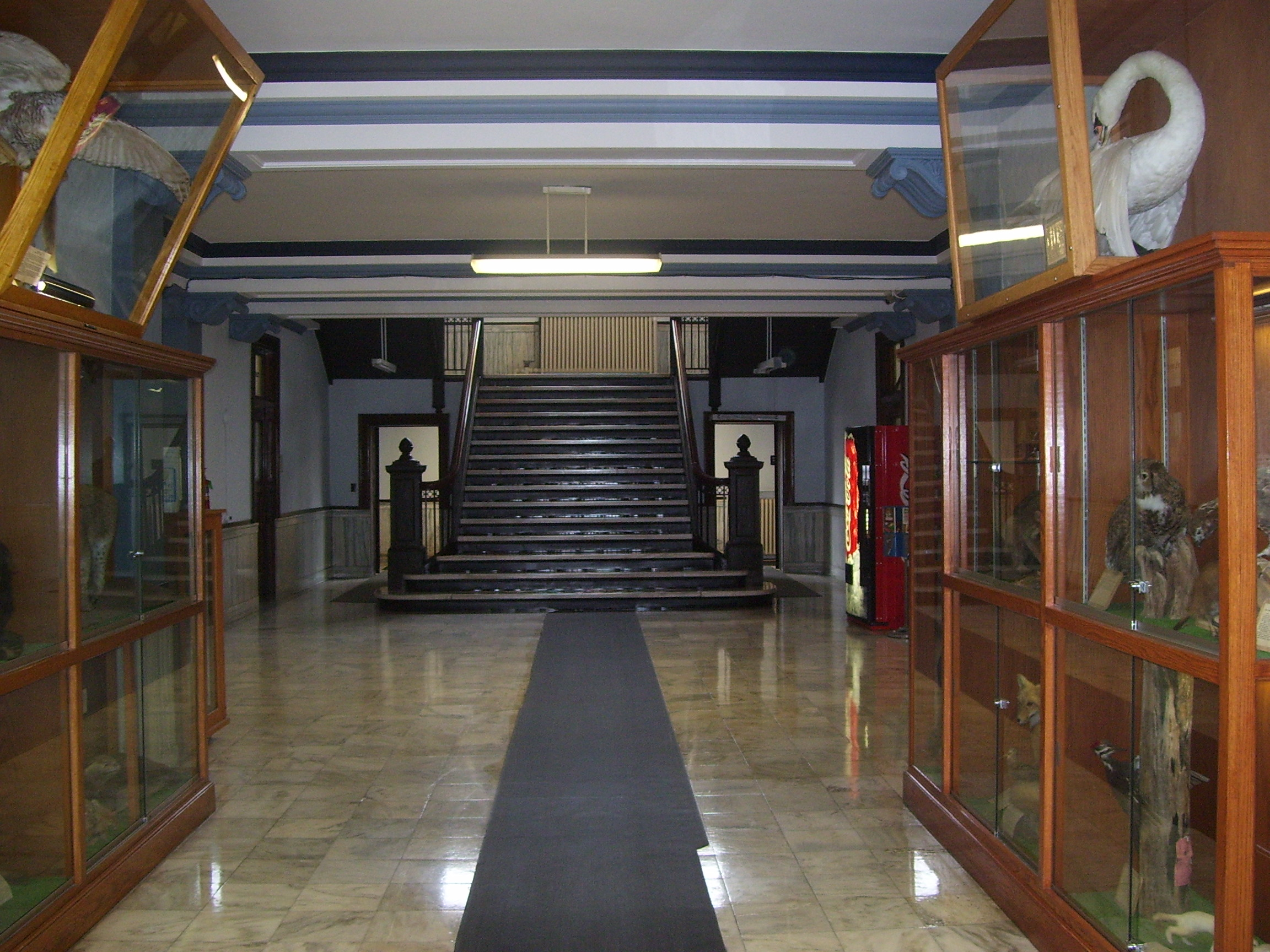
Interior of the Ashland County Courthouse, in Ashland, Wisconsin, United States.

== See also ==
National Register of Historic Places listings in Ashland County, Wisconsin
