= Michael A. McAuliffe =

Brigadier General in the United States Air Force

Michael A. McAuliffe (born 1941) was a brigadier general in the United States Air Force.

== Biography ==
McAuliffe was born in Ashland, Wisconsin, in 1941. He attended Kansas State University, George Washington University, and Harvard University.

== Career ==
McAuliffe was commissioned an officer in 1965. Following an assignment at Osan Air Base, he was stationed in South Vietnam as the Chief of Design and Deputy Chief of Staff of Civil Engineering of the Seventh Air Force during the Vietnam War. Following the war, he was stationed at The Pentagon where he was charged with formulating Air Force policy for air base development community facilities improvement, and evaluation of the environmental impact. He was named Deputy Chief of Staff for Engineering and Services in 1988, of Tactical Air Command in 1990, and of Air Combat Command in 1992. His retirement was effective as of March 1, 1994.

Awards he has received include the Distinguished Service Medal, Legion of Merit with oak leaf cluster, the Bronze Star Medal, the Meritorious Service Medal with three oak leaf clusters, and the Air Force Commendation Medal.
