= Whittlesea =

Whittlesea may refer to:

== Victoria, Australia ==
- Whittlesea, Victoria, a town north of Melbourne
  - City of Whittlesea, the local government area containing the town
- Whittlesea Football Club, an Australian rules football club in Melbourne
- Whittlesea Ranges FC, a soccer club in Melbourne

== Other uses ==
- Greg Whittlesea (born 1963), Australian rules footballer
- Whittlesey in Cambridgeshire, England (formerly Whittlesea), a town
  - Whittlesea railway station, serves Whittlesey
- Whittlesea, Eastern Cape, South Africa, a rural town

== See also ==
- Whittlesey (disambiguation)
