= William Whittlesey (disambiguation) =

William Whittlesey was a 14th-century archbishop of Canterbury.

William Whittlesey may also refer to:

- William A. Whittlesey (1796–1866), U.S. Representative from Ohio
- William Whittlesey (Massachusetts politician) in the 2006 Massachusetts House of Representatives election

== See also ==
- Williams-Whittlesey, boatbuilders
