= Charles Whittlesey =

Charles Whittlesey may refer to:

- Charles Whittlesey (geologist) (1808–1886), American geologist and archeologist
- Charles Frederick Whittlesey (1867–1941), American architect
- Charles W. Whittlesey (1884–c. 1921), American soldier
- Charles Whittlesey (lawyer) (1819–1874), Connecticut lawyer, Union soldier and briefly Virginia Attorney General
- Charles Whittlesey (politician) (1807–1863), American politician in Iowa
