= Asaph Whittlesey =

American politician

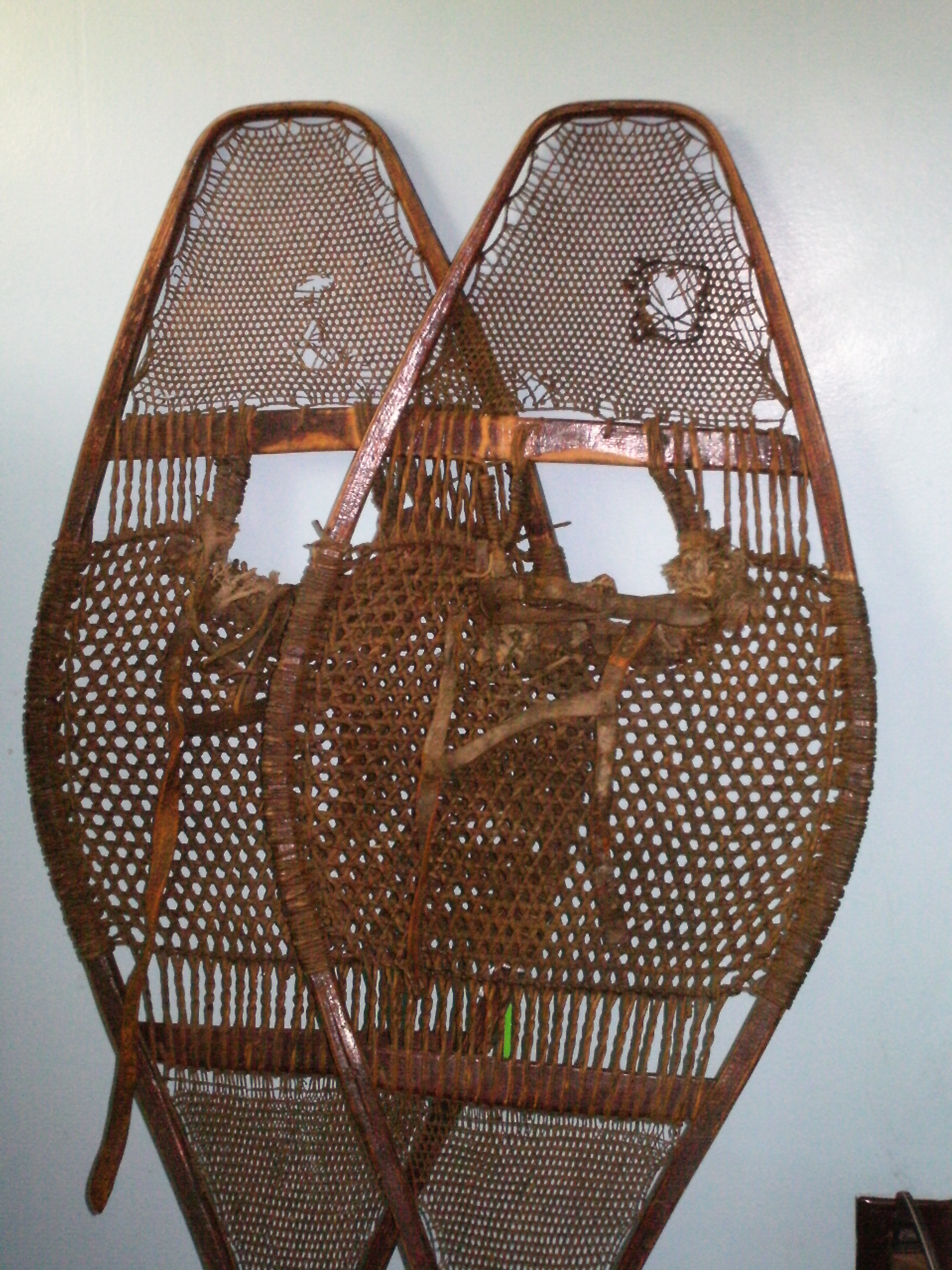
A pair of snowshoes reported to have belonged to Whittlesey.

Asaph Whittlesey (May 18, 1826 – December 15, 1879) was the first Wisconsin state legislator from the Lake Superior region. In 1854, he settled the city of Ashland, Wisconsin.

== Early years of Ashland ==
In 1854, Asaph left La Pointe in a rowboat, along with his companion, George Kilborn. Arriving at the bottom of Chequamegon Bay, they settled the area that is now the west side of Ashland. As other pioneers and lumbermen began to arrive, Asaph petitioned the government to name the community Ashland. However, at the time this name was already taken, and it was not until the other community named Ashland became defunct that the name Ashland was granted to Whittlesey's settlement.

== Wisconsin legislature ==
Asaph was elected to the Wisconsin State Assembly in 1859. In January 1860, he traveled by snowshoe all the way to Sparta to catch the nearest train to the state capitol in Madison. A famous image of him is a photograph taken during his journey, in which he is wearing his snowshoes, along with a pistol tucked into his belt. This 1860 photo was the basis of a mural in Ashland.

As a member of the Wisconsin Legislature, he was successful in petitioning the division of La Pointe County, and the creation of Ashland County (in which the city of Ashland is the county seat).

== Namesake ==
Whittlesey Creek, near Ashland, was named after him. This watershed also encompasses what is known as the Whittlesey Creek National Wildlife Refuge.
