= Ashland Daily Press =

American newspaper

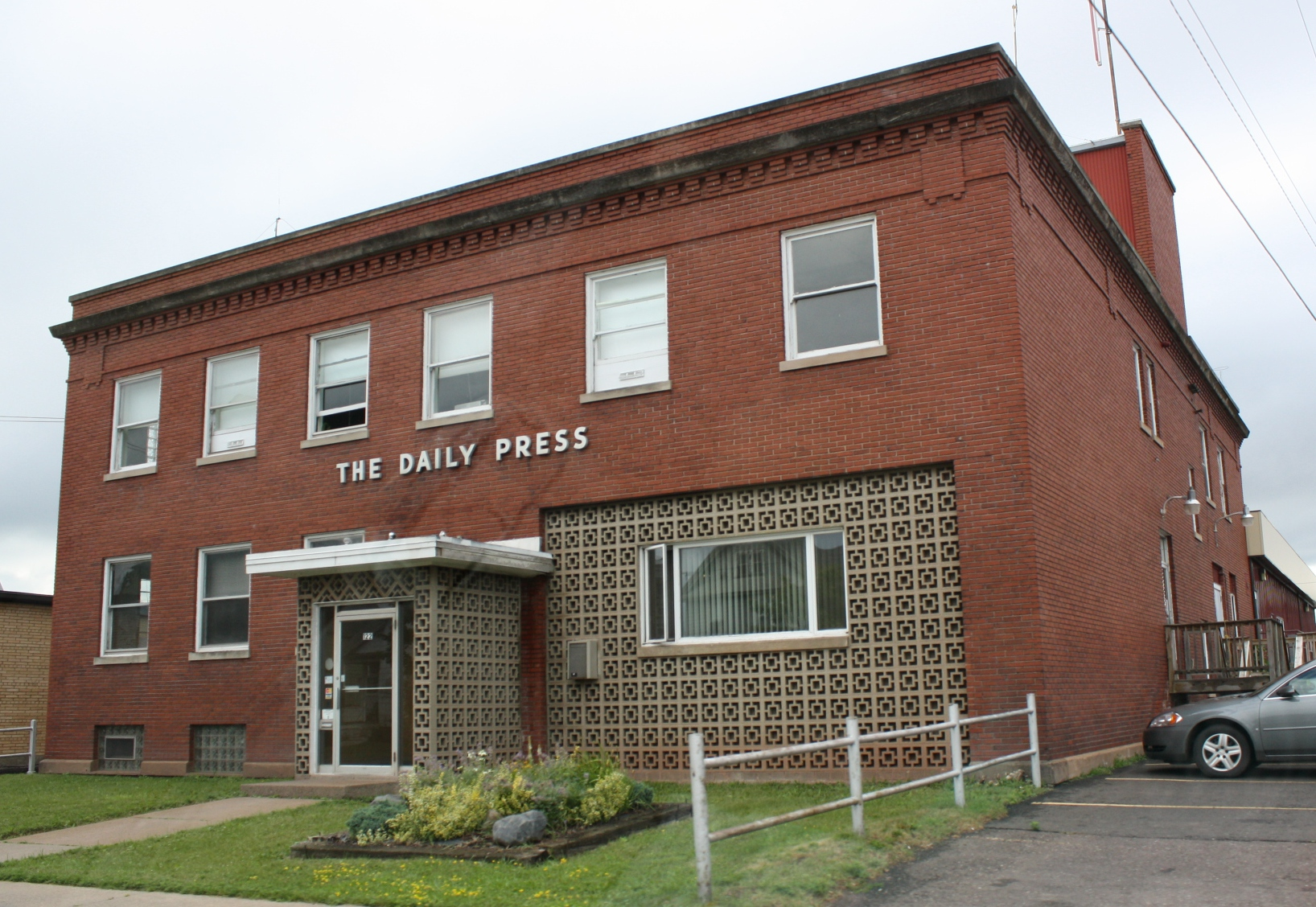
- Ashland Daily Press Building
- Type: Twice-weekly
- Format: Broadsheet
- Owner: Adams MultiMedia
- Publisher: Paul Gaier
- Editor: Tom Stankard
- Founded: 1888
- Language: English
- Headquarters: 122 W. Third St. Ashland, WI United States
- Circulation: 3,173 (as of 2022)
- ISSN: 1050-4095
- Website: www.apg-wi.com/ashland_daily_press/;

The Ashland Daily Press (or simply Daily Press) is a twice-weekly newspaper based in Ashland, Wisconsin. It is primarily distributed in Ashland, Bayfield, Douglas, Iron, Price and Sawyer counties.

== History ==
The Daily Press was founded in 1888. American Consolidated Media (ACM) bought the paper in 2007; in 2014, Adams Publishing Group (APG) acquired 34 papers, including the Daily Press, from ACM.

In 2015, APG acquired three shoppers based in Ashland: the Evergreen Country Shopper, North Country Sun and Evergreen Zone 2.
