= Northern Great Lakes Visitor Center =

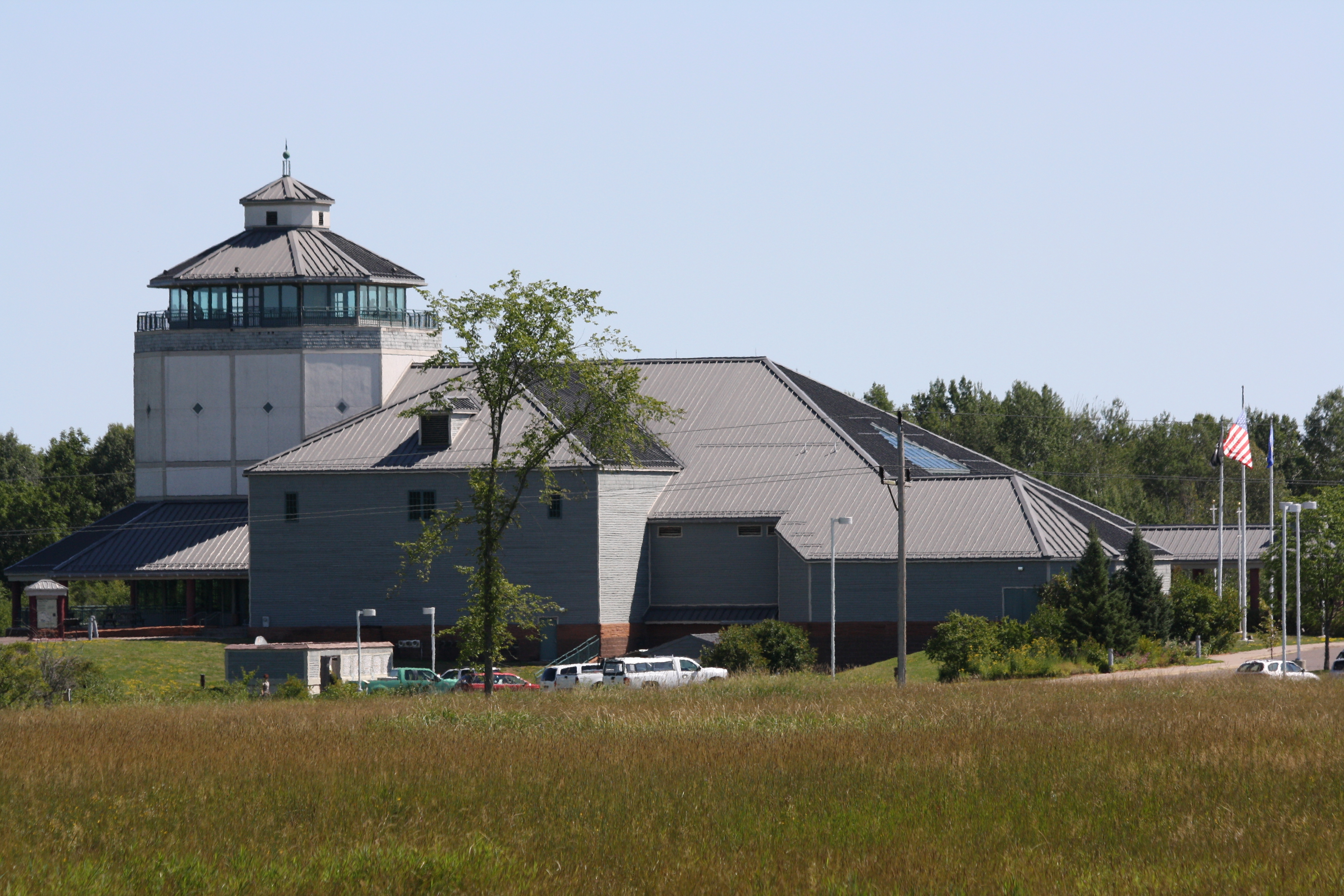
- Established: 1998
- Location: 29270 County Highway G, Ashland, Wisconsin; United States (near the corner of Highway G and U.S. Route 2)
- Type: Visitor center, museum, community space and nature center
- Key holdings: Regional archive office of the Wisconsin Historical Society (on second floor)
- Collections: Historical displays of regional interest, especially of natural history
- Owner: US Forest Service
- Website: nglvc.org

The Northern Great Lakes Visitor Center is a visitor center and natural history museum located west of Ashland, Wisconsin, near the corner of Highway G and U.S. Highway 2. The facility is open five days per week (Tuesday through Saturday) and offers free admission.

The facility was renamed the David R. Obey Northern Great Lakes Visitor Center in 2020 in honor of Dave Obey, who served as a member of the United States House of Representatives for Wisconsin's 7th congressional district from 1969 to 2011.

== Facility ==
The facility opened in 1998, and is operated through a partnership that includes the US Forest Service, National Park Service, United States Fish and Wildlife Service, Wisconsin Historical Society, University of Wisconsin–Extension, and the Friends of the Center Alliance, Limited.

The center has three floors of exhibits, with the first floor housing the natural history exhibits, information center, conference room, gift shop, and the Martin Hansen Theatre. A large variety of historical and science-related documentaries can be viewed in the Theatre, at the request of visitors.

The second floor is the home of a regional archive office, of the Wisconsin Historical Society.

Behind the building is a ¾-mile interpretive boardwalk trail that winds along a black ash swamp, sedge meadow, and mature cedar and tamarack swamp.

== Exhibits ==
The main permanent exhibit on the first floor offers an extensive display of the natural history of the region, particularly as it relates to Lake Superior. A smaller exhibit space on the second floor is home to a periodically changing exhibit, which usually relates more to regional human history, rather than natural history.
