= WNXR =

- Iron River, Wisconsin; United States
- Frequency: 107.3 MHz
- Branding: 107.3 WNXR

Programming
- Format: Classic hits
- Affiliations: United Stations Radio Networks; Packers Radio Network; Brewers Radio Network

Ownership
- Owner: Heartland Comm. License, LLC
- Sister stations: WATW, WBSZ, WJJH

History
- First air date: April 22, 1994

Technical information
- Licensing authority: FCC
- Facility ID: 8611
- Class: C3
- ERP: 21,000 watts
- HAAT: 110 m (361 ft)
- Transmitter coordinates: 46°32′49.00″N 91°24′50.00″W

Links
- Public license information: Public file; LMS
- Webcast: Listen Live
- Website: wnxrfm.com

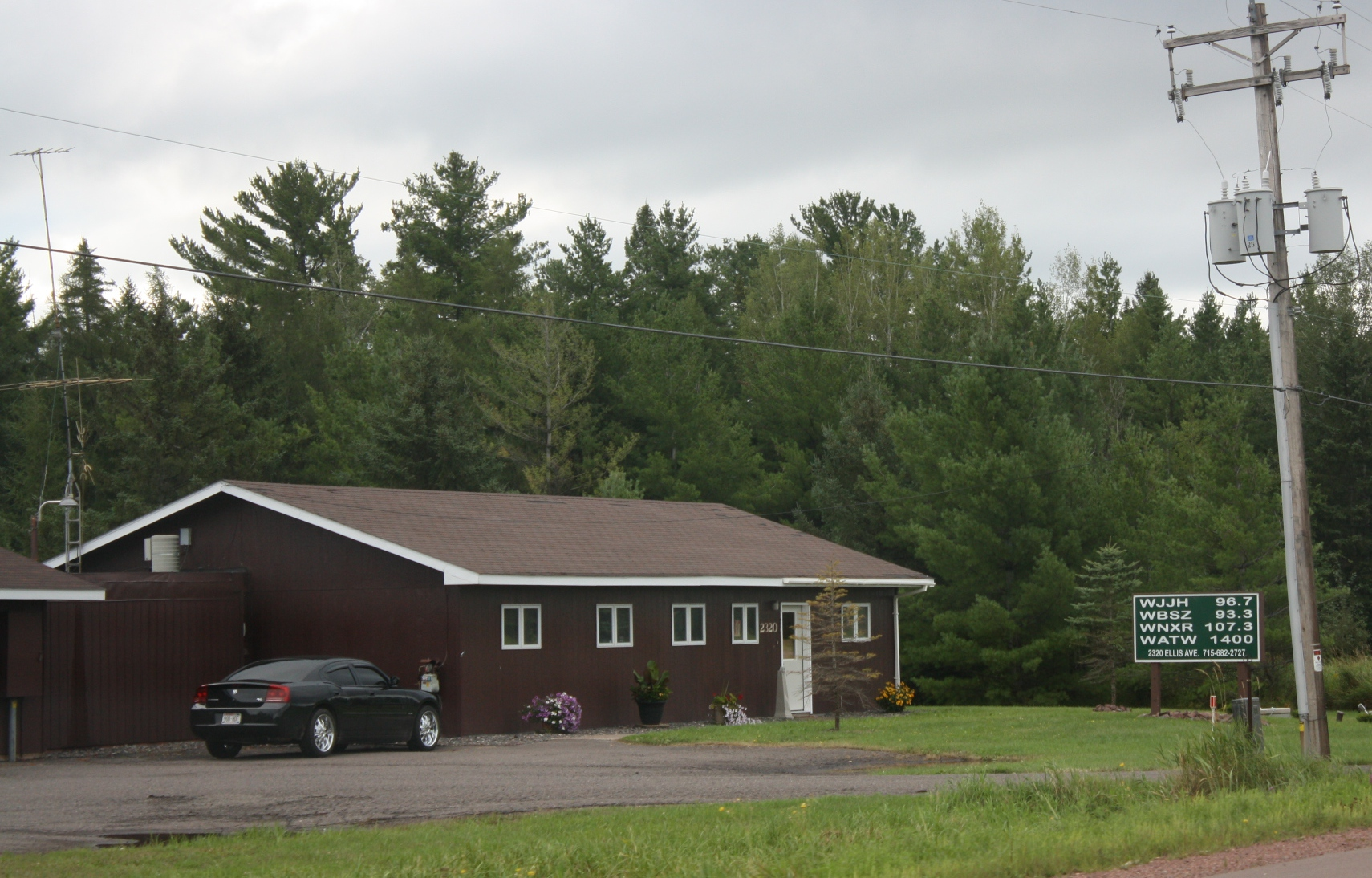
Studios

WNXR (107.3 FM) is a radio station broadcasting a classic hits format. Licensed to Iron River, Wisconsin, the station is currently owned by Heartland Comm. License, LLC, and features programming from United Stations Radio Networks. It serves Ashland and Bayfield counties, and has a rimshot signal to the Duluth area.

The studios are at 2320 Ellis Avenue in Ashland. The transmitter site is on Spider Lake Road, south of Iron River, Wisconsin.

Previous logo
