= Ashland, Wisconsin =

- City
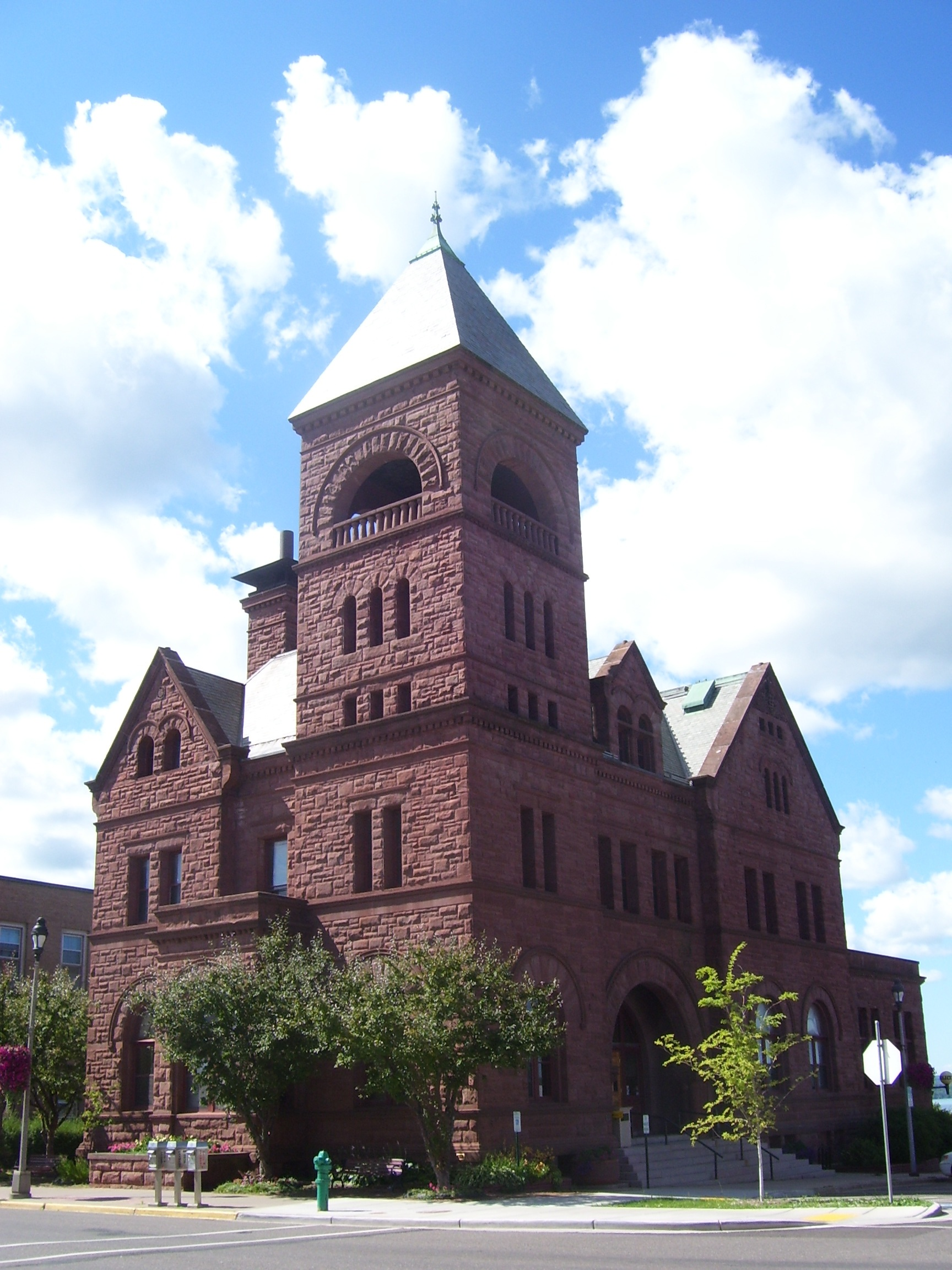
- Ashland City Hall was built in 1893 from locally quarried brownstone.

- Seal

- Location of Ashland in Ashland County and Bayfield County, Wisconsin

- Location within Wisconsin Location within the United States
- Coordinates: 46°35′24″N 90°52′48″W
- Country: United States
- State: Wisconsin
- Counties: Ashland, Bayfield

Government
  - Mayor: Matthew McKenzie
  - City Council: Members: Kevin Seefeldt; Sarah Jackson; Ana Tochterman; (Vacant); Laura Graf; Charlie Ortman; Dick Pufall

Area
  - Total: 13.60 sq mi (35.22 km^{2})
  - Land: 13.34 sq mi (34.56 km^{2})
  - Water: 0.25 sq mi (0.66 km^{2})
- Elevation: 673 ft (205 m)

Population (2020)
  - Total: 7,908
  - Estimate (2024): 7,940
  - Density: 592.6/sq mi (228.8/km^{2})
- Time zone: UTC−6 (CST)
  - Summer (DST): UTC−5 (CDT)
- ZIP code: 54806
- Area codes: 715 & 534
- FIPS code: 55-03225
- GNIS feature ID: 1560982
- Public Transit: Bay Area Rural Transit
- Website: www.coawi.org

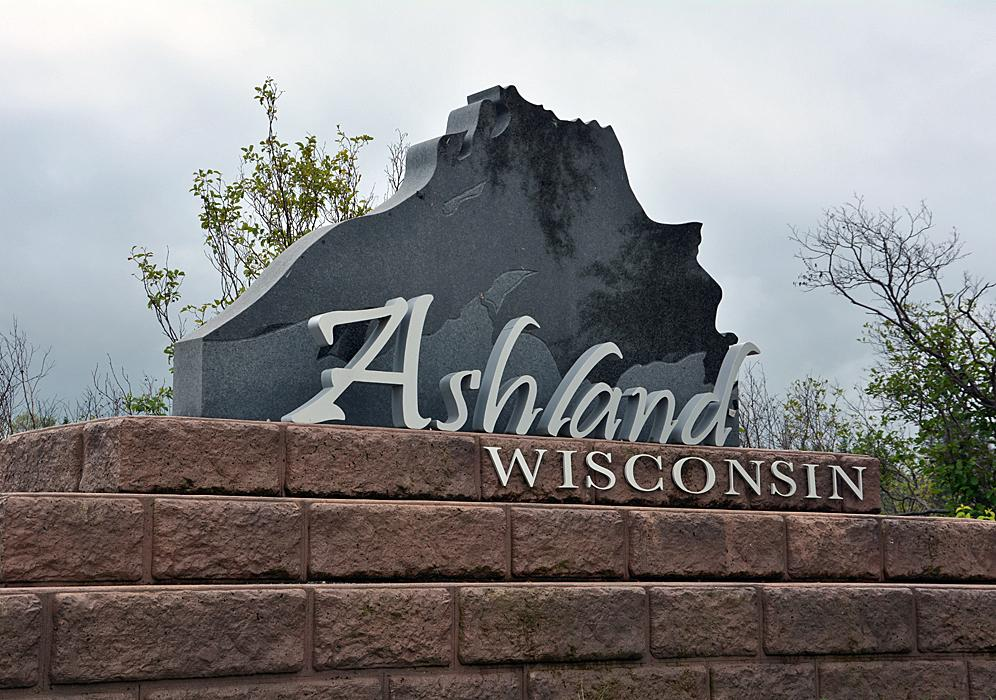
Ashland, Wisconsin

Ashland is a city in Ashland and Bayfield counties in the U.S. state of Wisconsin. It is the county seat of Ashland County. The city is a port on Lake Superior, near the head of Chequamegon Bay. The population was 7,908 in the 2020 census, all of whom resided in the Ashland County portion of the city. The unpopulated Bayfield County portion is in the city's southwest, bordered by the easternmost part of the Town of Eileen.

The junction of U.S. Route 2 (US 2) and Wisconsin Highway 13 (WIS 13) is located at this city. It is the home of Northwood Technical College, the Sigurd Olson Environmental Institute, and the recently closed Northland College. The town's original name, zhamawanik, means 'long stretched beaver' in Ojibwe.

== History ==
=== Pre-settlement ===
Eight Native American tribes lived on Chequamegon Bay. Later settlers included European explorers, missionaries and fur traders, and more recently, Yankees from the eastern United States who platted and developed the lands, railroaders, shippers, loggers, entrepreneurs, and other settlers. Four flags have flown over the area around Ashland from colonial to contemporary times: Spanish, French, English and American.

The area was part of the United States' Northwest Territory. This region was divided into four successive territories for administration before becoming part of the state of Wisconsin: Indiana Territory, Michigan Territory, Illinois Territory, and Wisconsin Territory.

About the time Christopher Columbus arrived in the New World in the late 15th century, the Ojibwe people came to the land they called Sha-ga-waun-il-ong. This term has been translated numerous ways: 'lowlands, the needle, the region of shallow water', and where 'there are large extended breakers'. Each is descriptive and suitably accurate. The Ojibwe stayed on Chequamegon Point for nearly a century before leaving. They settled first on Madeline Island and then moved to the Sault Ste. Marie region.

French fur traders Pierre d'Esprit, le Sieur Radisson and Medard Chouart, le Sieur des Groseilliers were the first Europeans of record to visit Chequamegon Bay. They arrived in 1659 and built what has been called the first European dwelling place in what is now Wisconsin. A historical marker noting this is located at Maslowski Beach on US 2 on the west end of Ashland. The monument was erected in 1929 by the Old Settlers Club.

The Ojibwe heartily welcomed the Frenchmen. Five years later, Father Claude-Jean Allouez arrived. A Jesuit missionary, he brought the first word of Christianity to Wisconsin's shores. Allouez built a chapel not far from the stockade erected by Radisson and Groseillier; he worked and lived at the Bay until 1669.

=== Settlement ===
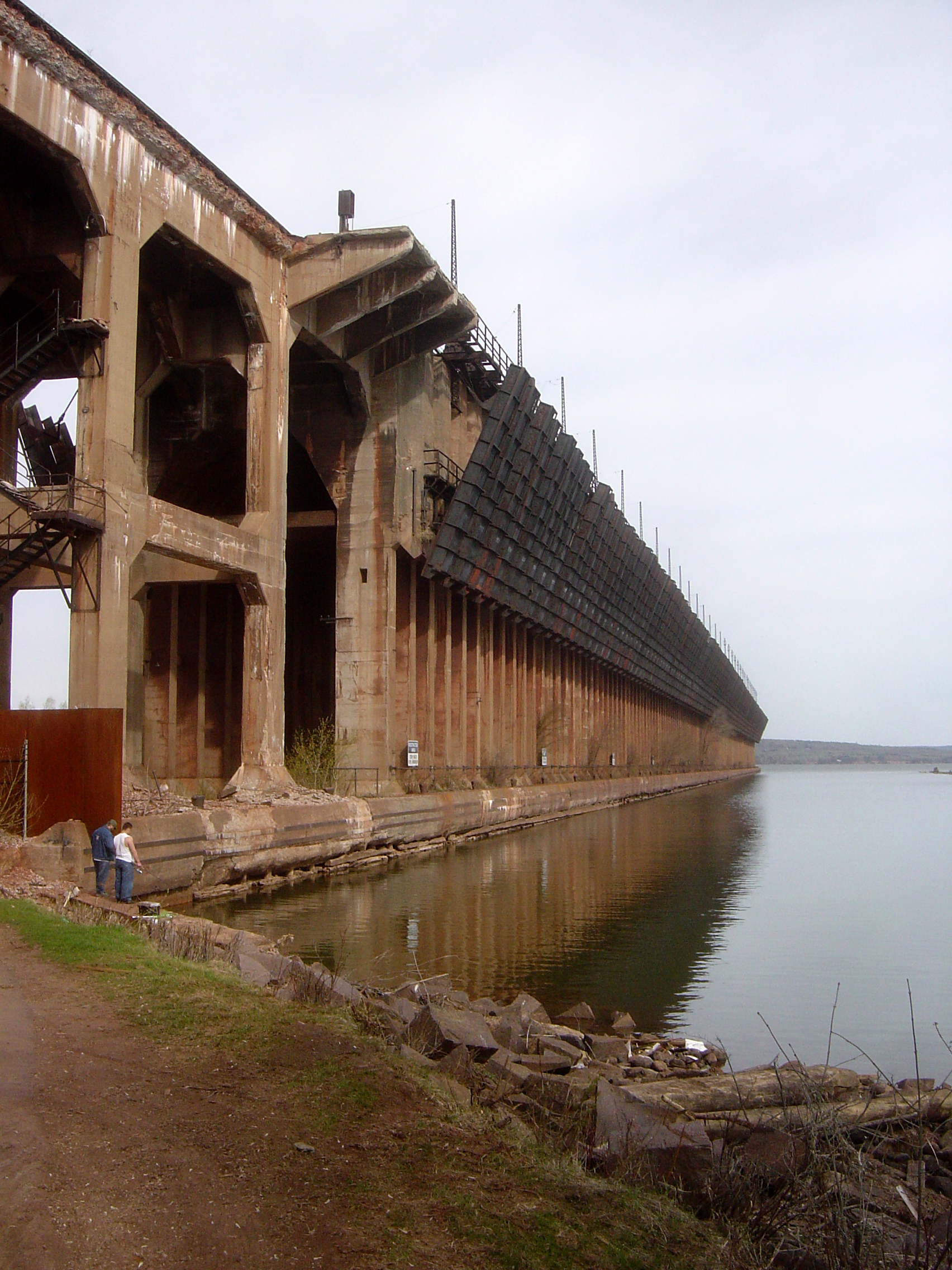
The massive Soo Line ore dock in 2007, before its demolition.

In 1854, Ohioans Asaph Whittlesey and George Kilborn set out from La Pointe to explore the head of Chequamegon Bay. Whittlesey built a 10 ft (3.0 m) × 14 ft (4.3 m) cabin in Ashland. His wife, Lucy, and daughter, Eugenia, joined him in August and prepared to winter in their new home. Signs of settlement soon began to take place. The first community dance was held at their house. The Reverend L. H. Wheeler preached the first sermon on the first Independence Day that was observed there. This village was the location of the first post office and polling place for county offices. Sunday school was also conducted on the premises.

The Milwaukee, Lakeshore and Western Railroad platted the city in 1885, as railroad construction moved westward. Local landowner Martin Beaser named the settlement Ashland after Kentucky statesman Henry Clay’s residence. Previous names for the area included Bay City, Saint Mark (for Saint Mark's Basilica), and Whittlesey, the latter in honor of initial postmaster Adolph Whittlesey.

In the nineteenth century, immigrants to the area included many individuals and families from Germany and northern Europe, as shown by the numerous Lutheran churches in town. Some were initially attracted to agriculture or jobs in the mining industry.

=== Tar and feather attacks during World War I ===
During the last year of World War I, from March–October 1918, six recorded incidents of vigilantism took place in the Ashland area, committed against men of German descent, who were suspected of pro-German sympathies.

In Ashland mobs of masked men abducted individuals at night from their homes, driving each to secluded areas where the men were tarred and feathered. A group identifying as the Knights of Liberty claimed responsibility for the attacks, saying in a letter to a local paper, "We have no purpose to do injustice to any man, but we do feel that any treasonable and seditious acts, or utterances, demand prompt punishment. These cases must not be allowed to run indefinitely, without anything being done. We want action and we want it now."

Victims included:

- Professor E. A. Schimler, abducted, tarred and feathered on March 31, 1918. Born in Germany, Schimler taught French at local Northland College. He was unable to identify any of his assailants.
- Bartender Adolph Anton, taken from his home on April 9, and stripped, tarred and feathered for his suspected "pro-Germanism". Anton claimed to recognize two of the men, Ephraim Gay and George Buchanan, who were arrested, pleaded not guilty, and released on their own recognizance. A municipal judge dismissed the cases at the preliminary hearing in July. Anton left Ashland, moving to Gary, Indiana.
- William Landraint, 62, was seized in front of a downtown hotel by a mob of fifty men who put a bag over his head, handcuffed him, and drove him to the country, where he was tarred and feathered. Of German birth, Landraint was a deputy tax assessor who had been forced out of his job because of prejudice and suspected disloyalty. Despite dozens of witnesses to the kidnapping by unmasked men, none claimed to know any of the participants. Landraint later asked for police protection after receiving a threatening letter. He soon left town for St. Paul, Minnesota.
- In early June 1918 Emil Kunze went to Ashland police headquarters to report hearing men outside his home conspiring to tar and feather him for his alleged pro-Germanism. He asked for permission to sleep in the jail. He later quit his truck driving job and left town.
- In early July 1918 farmer Martin Johnson of nearby Sweden, Wisconsin, was visited at his home by men asking assistance in locating a nearby fishing stream. Once away from the house, they drove Johnson to a secluded area, and stripped, tarred and feathered him.
- On October 25, 1918, John Oestrycher, a farmer living eight miles outside Ashland, was tarred and feathered for not buying Liberty Bonds and for being "pro-German".

Governor Emanuel Philipp expressed his indignation over these incidents, as well as reports of local ethnic Germans receiving threatening letters. He directed state Attorney General Spencer Haven to launch an inquiry. His investigator found the local citizenry uncooperative, including John C. Chapple, editor of the Ashland Daily Press and campaign manager for Roy P. Wilcox, a Republican candidate for governor proclaiming his own patriotism. The inquiry found the community generally satisfied with the treatment of the first victims. Haven expressed frustration at the local court, which refused to adjourn to allow the securing of evidence, and at the district attorney, who dismissed the first two cases for lack of said evidence. Haven threatened to send a company of the state guard to maintain law and order in the area. Ultimately no one was convicted for any of the attacks. Two months after the world war ended, newspapers reported that the local Knights of Liberty had disbanded. The Milwaukee Journal reported that more than 800 men in Ashland County belonged to the order.

=== Dates of note ===
- 1856 — First plat of Ashland registered
- 1870 — First Ashland brownstone quarried and shipped
- 1872 — First sawmill built by W.R. Sutherland
- 1872 — The Ashland Weekly Press is founded by Sam Fifield. It became a daily paper more than a decade later. The first issue of the Ashland Daily Press was March 5, 1888.
- 1874 — First brewery built, Ashland Brewing Company
- 1877 — Wisconsin Central Railroad connected Ashland to Chicago
- 1877 — Chequamegon Hotel opened, one block from current hotel
- 1887 — State legislature incorporated the City of Ashland
- 1889 — Wisconsin Central Depot constructed
- 1892 — Northern Wisconsin Academy opened (later known as Northland College)
- 1892 — Ashland Post Office built
- 1904 — Ashland High School opened
- 1918 – During the last year of the war, at least six men were individually attacked by vigilante groups acting against ethnic Germans
- 1929 — First airport opened
- 1940 — WATW radio went on the air
- 1970 — Establishment of the Apostle Islands National Lakeshore
- 1972 — Memorial Medical Center opened
- 1979 — The Union Depot is listed on the National Register of Historic Places.
- 1984 — The West Second Street Historic District is listed on the National Register of Historic Places. Second Street was later renamed Main Street.
- 1998 — Northern Great Lakes Visitor Center is built
- 2009 — Ore dock slated for demolition. Attempts by community members to preserve the historic structure were not successful.
- 2014 — The Chapple and MacArthur Avenues Residential Historic District is listed on the National Register of Historic Places.
- 2016 — New fire hall dedicated, replacing the historic, century-old Ellis Fire Station.
- 2016 — From July 11 until August, Ashland suffered one of the worst storm seasons in its history. Highways going to Ironwood and Marengo were severely damaged, as were portions of infrastructure at Saxon Harbor. Residents reported flooding of many basements by lake and rain waters. Three deaths were reported.

=== Ore dock ===
The harbor of Ashland was dominated by the massive Wisconsin Central Railway (later Soo Line) ore dock, built in 1916 to load iron ore mined in the area into freighters bound for industrial ports in the Midwest, such as Ashtabula, Ohio, where steel was produced. The last of what had once been many such docks, the concrete structure was 80 feet (24 m) high and 75 feet (23 m) wide. In 1925 the dock was extended to 1,800 feet (550 m); it was last used to ship ore in 1965.

In 2007 the Wisconsin Trust for Historic Preservation named it one of the "10 most endangered historic buildings in Wisconsin", a list intended to stir preservation efforts. The main concrete structure and trestle had slowly deteriorated since the early 1970s because of lack of maintenance and the effects of the environment. A structural inspection completed in 2006 and 2007 concluded that the ore dock had become structurally unsafe and was an imminent safety hazard. On May 14, 2009, the Ashland Planning Commission granted Canadian National Railway approval for demolition of the dock. All material on the ore dock was removed, down to the concrete base. This was completed in 2013.

The base of the ore dock remains. The city took ownership of it from Canadian National Railway in May 2014. It is working with a consultant group to design a redevelopment plan for the base of the dock.

== Geography ==
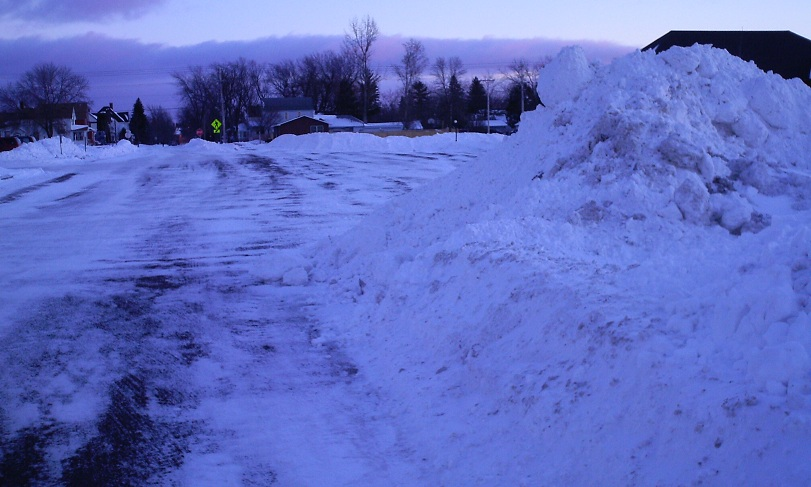
Large amounts of snow can accumulate over the long, cold winters.

Ashland is located along the south shore of Chequamegon Bay. According to the United States Census Bureau, the city has a total area of 13.70 square miles (35.48 km^{2}), of which 13.42 square miles (34.76 km^{2}) is land and 0.28 square miles (0.73 km^{2}) is water.

=== Climate ===
Ashland has a humid continental climate (Koppen: Dfb) with four distinct seasons and notably cold winters. Due to the city's proximity to Lake Superior, it sometimes has lake effect snow storms, with high amounts of snow recorded.

Climate data for Ashland, Wisconsin (John F. Kennedy Memorial Airport), 1991–2020 normals, (Note: Mean monthly maxima and minima (i.e. the expected highest and lowest temperature readings at any point during the year or given month) calculated based on data at said location from 1991 to 2020.) extremes 1893–present (Note: Records kept continuously at John F. Kennedy Memorial Airport since October 14, 1998, and at a farm co-op site around Ashland from March 1893 to October 13, 1998. See ThreadEx.)
Month	Jan	Feb	Mar	Apr	May	Jun	Jul	Aug	Sep	Oct	Nov	Dec	Year
Record high °F (°C)	58 (14)	62 (17)	84 (29)	91 (33)	96 (36)	99 (37)	107 (42)	103 (39)	100 (38)	94 (34)	78 (26)	60 (16)	107 (42)
Mean maximum °F (°C)	41.2 (5.1)	47.0 (8.3)	60.0 (15.6)	75.6 (24.2)	84.7 (29.3)	89.4 (31.9)	90.9 (32.7)	89.1 (31.7)	85.2 (29.6)	77.5 (25.3)	59.7 (15.4)	45.0 (7.2)	92.9 (33.8)
Mean daily maximum °F (°C)	22.3 (−5.4)	26.6 (−3.0)	37.8 (3.2)	50.6 (10.3)	64.4 (18.0)	73.4 (23.0)	78.9 (26.1)	77.1 (25.1)	69.0 (20.6)	55.4 (13.0)	40.1 (4.5)	27.6 (−2.4)	51.9 (11.1)
Daily mean °F (°C)	14.0 (−10.0)	17.2 (−8.2)	27.9 (−2.3)	39.5 (4.2)	51.5 (10.8)	61.0 (16.1)	66.7 (19.3)	65.1 (18.4)	57.4 (14.1)	45.0 (7.2)	32.3 (0.2)	20.1 (−6.6)	41.5 (5.3)
Mean daily minimum °F (°C)	5.8 (−14.6)	7.7 (−13.5)	17.9 (−7.8)	28.5 (−1.9)	38.6 (3.7)	48.5 (9.2)	54.5 (12.5)	53.2 (11.8)	45.8 (7.7)	34.7 (1.5)	24.5 (−4.2)	12.6 (−10.8)	31.0 (−0.6)
Mean minimum °F (°C)	−17.7 (−27.6)	−15.6 (−26.4)	−6.9 (−21.6)	14.1 (−9.9)	25.8 (−3.4)	34.3 (1.3)	43.1 (6.2)	40.8 (4.9)	30.5 (−0.8)	21.3 (−5.9)	5.7 (−14.6)	−10.9 (−23.8)	−20.6 (−29.2)
Record low °F (°C)	−41 (−41)	−40 (−40)	−30 (−34)	−5 (−21)	16 (−9)	23 (−5)	32 (0)	29 (−2)	12 (−11)	0 (−18)	−16 (−27)	−32 (−36)	−41 (−41)
Average precipitation inches (mm)	0.64 (16)	0.70 (18)	1.12 (28)	2.26 (57)	3.45 (88)	3.92 (100)	3.93 (100)	3.44 (87)	3.03 (77)	2.83 (72)	1.55 (39)	0.98 (25)	27.85 (707)
Average precipitation days (≥ 0.01 in)	6.7	6.2	7.8	10.0	12.1	12.9	12.9	13.9	12.7	11.3	8.9	7.9	123.3
Source: NOAA

== Demographics ==
Historical population
Census	Pop.	Note	%±
1890	9,956		—
1900	13,074		31.3%
1910	11,594		−11.3%
1920	11,334		−2.2%
1930	10,622		−6.3%
1940	11,101		4.5%
1950	10,640		−4.2%
1960	10,132		−4.8%
1970	9,615		−5.1%
1980	9,115		−5.2%
1990	8,695		−4.6%
2000	8,620		−0.9%
2010	8,216		−4.7%
2020	7,908		−3.7%
2021 (est.)	7,918		0.1%
U.S. Decennial Census

=== 2020 census ===
As of the census of 2020, the population was 7,908. The population density was 591.7 inhabitants per square mile (228.5/km^{2}). There were 3,860 housing units at an average density of 288.8 per square mile (111.5/km^{2}). The racial makeup of the city was 80.5% White, 10.0% Native American, 1.0% Black or African American, 0.8% Asian, 0.1% Pacific Islander, 0.4% from other races, and 7.2% from two or more races. Ethnically, the population was 2.8% Hispanic or Latino of any race.

=== 2010 census ===
As of the census of 2010, there were 8,216 people, 3,516 households, and 1,942 families residing in the city. The population density was 612.2 inhabitants per square mile (236.4/km^{2}). There were 3,864 housing units at an average density of 287.9 per square mile (111.2/km^{2}). The racial makeup of the city was 87.0% White, 0.5% African American, 7.5% Native American, 0.5% Asian, 0.5% from other races, and 4.0% from two or more races. Hispanic or Latino of any race were 2.1% of the population.

There were 3,516 households, of which 26.6% had children under the age of 18 living with them, 37.7% were married couples living together, 12.6% had a female householder with no husband present, 4.9% had a male householder with no wife present, and 44.8% were non-families. 36.7% of all households were made up of individuals, and 14.4% had someone living alone who was 65 years of age or older. The average household size was 2.17 and the average family size was 2.81.

The median age in the city was 38.6 years. 21% of residents were under the age of 18; 13% were between the ages of 18 and 24; 23.1% were from 25 to 44; 26.7% were from 45 to 64; and 16.3% were 65 years of age or older. The gender makeup of the city was 48.2% male and 51.8% female.

=== 2000 census ===
As of the census of 2000, there were 8,620 people, 3,513 households, and 2,027 families residing in the city. The population density was 643.3 people per square mile (248.4/km^{2}). There were 3,777 housing units at an average density of 108.8 persons/km^{2} (281.9 persons/sq mi). The racial makeup of the city was 90.17% White, 0.32% African American, 6.30% Native American, 0.49% Asian, 0.06% Pacific Islander, 0.43% from other races, and 2.23% from two or more races. 1.37% of the population were Hispanic or Latino of any race.

There were 3,513 households, out of which 28.3% had children under the age of 18 living with them, 42.5% were married couples living together, 11.7% have a woman whose husband does not live with her, and 42.3% were non-families. 35.6% of all households were made up of individuals, and 16.3% had someone living alone who was 65 years of age or older. The average household size was 2.24 and the average family size was 2.91.

In the city, the population was spread out, with 22.2% under the age of 18, 15.4% from 18 to 24, 24.7% from 25 to 44, 20.1% from 45 to 64, and 17.6% who were 65 years of age or older. The median age was 36 years. For every 100 females, there were 91.2 males. For every 100 females age 18 and over, there were 84.8 males.

The median income for a household in the city was $30,853, and the median income for a family was $40,549. Males had a median income of $30,122 versus $20,926 for females. The per capita income for the city was $16,330. About 7.5% of families and 12.7% of the population were below the poverty line, including 9.9% of those under the age of 18 and 10.0% ages 65 or older.

== Government ==
Ashland has a mayor-council form of government. The mayor is elected at-large. In 2014, Debra Lewis was the first woman elected as mayor. The city's 11 wards are each represented by an elected alderperson (or councilor), elected from single-member districts. City council meetings are held on the second and last Tuesday of the month. Meetings are open to the public, although on occasion the Council may meet in closed session. One of the recent members, Wahsayah Whitebird, was one of only two members of the Communist Party USA in elected office during his tenure.

Ashland City Hall is housed in the city's first post office, built by the federal government in 1893. It is listed on the National Register of Historic Places as the "Old Ashland Post Office". The County Courthouse is also located in the city.

In the Wisconsin State Legislature, Ashland is located in the 74th Assembly District, and the 25th Senate District, represented by Assembly Representative Beth Meyers and State Senator Janet Bewley.

In the United States House of Representatives, Ashland is part of Wisconsin's 7th congressional district. The seat is currently held by Tom Tiffany.

Presidential elections results

Presidential elections results
Year	Republican	Democratic	Third parties
2024	36.8% 1,563	61.2% 2,598	2.0% 83
2020	35.7% 1,518	62.5% 2,660	1.8% 75
2016	34.5% 1,388	58.3% 2,348	7.2% 289
2012	30.5% 1,240	67.5% 2,741	1.9% 78
2008	27.3% 1,177	71.3% 3,071	1.4% 61
2004	33.9% 1,567	65.1% 3,007	1.0% 45
2000	34.0% 1,399	58.2% 2,391	7.8% 319

== Economy ==
A few of the largest manufacturers in the community include:

- Bretting Manufacturing, a manufacturer of equipment used for paper converting
- Larson-Juhl, manufacturer of picture frames, a subsidiary of Berkshire Hathaway
- H Window, window manufacturer

Many small businesses also make up a large portion of the local economy. Tourism is an important part of the area's commerce. The summer season attracts tourists for activities on the Great Lakes.

== Education ==
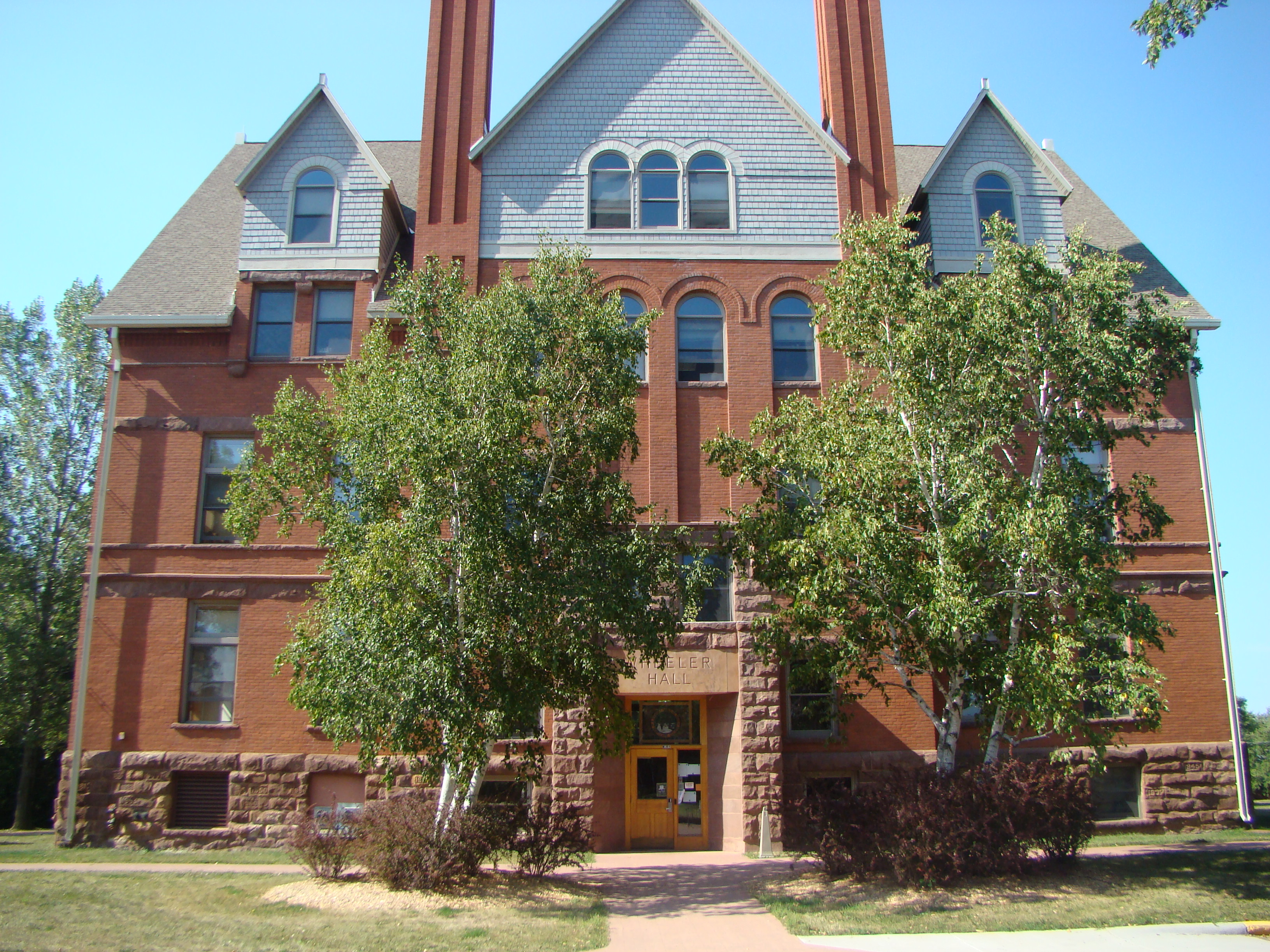
Wheeler Hall, the original and oldest building at the former Northland College, is listed on the National Register of Historic Places.

=== Public schools ===
- Lake Superior Primary/Intermediate/Charter School
- Marengo Valley Elementary School
- Ashland Middle School
- Ashland High School

=== Private schools ===
- Ashland Seventh-day Adventist School
- Celebration Christian Academy
- Our Lady of the Lake School
- Zion Lutheran Christian School

=== Colleges ===
- Northwood Technical College

== Media ==
=== News media ===
- Ashland Daily Press, local daily print publication
- Bottom Line News and Views
- Lake Superior Sounder (closed in January 2008)

=== Radio ===
- WATW 1400 AM – Conservative talk radio
- WUWS 90.9 FM — Ideas network of Wisconsin Public Radio
- K210CG FM 91.9, Simulcasting Duluth's Contemporary Christian KDNW, owned by the University of Northwestern – St Paul
- WBSZ 93.3 FM – Country music
- WWMD-LP 95.3FM – Christian talk radio (Catholic)
- WJJH 96.7 FM – Rock music
- WIMI 99.7 FM – Adult Contemporary music (Broadcast from Ironwood, MI)
- W284AN 104.7 FM – News and Classical Musical network of Wisconsin Public Radio
- WEGZ 105.9 FM – Christian talk radio (broadcast from Washburn, WI)
- WNXR 107.3 FM – Oldies (broadcast from Iron River, WI)

=== Television ===
Stations serving Ashland come from the Duluth market:

- 3 KDLH (CBS)
- 6 KBJR (NBC)
- 8 WDSE (PBS)
- 10 WDIO (ABC)
- 21 KQDS (Fox)

== Transportation ==
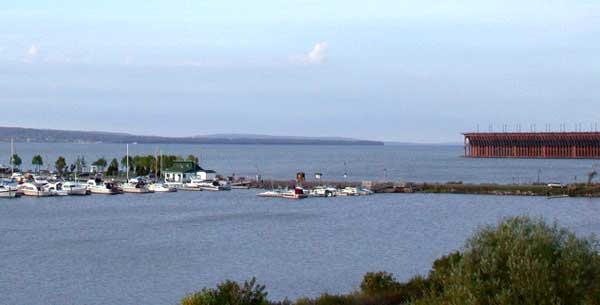
Ashland Marina, looking north across Chequamegon Bay toward Lake Superior, with the ore dock in the background

The two major highways in the city are US 2 and WIS 13.

=== Railroads ===
The city was one of the northern termini in Wisconsin for the Canadian National Railway (CN), parent company of the former Wisconsin Central Ltd. It took over the former Soo Line tracks in 1987. However, flooding in 2016 caused substantial damage to bridges south of town, and CN discontinued service to Ashland (trains now reach only as far north as Park Falls).

While Ashland has not had passenger train service since 1971, both Union Depot and the Soo Line Depot survive and are listed on the National Register of Historic Places.

=== Airports ===
Airports certified for commercial carrier operations near Ashland:

- Gogebic-Iron County Airport (about 54 miles (87 km); Ironwood, Michigan)
- Duluth International Airport (about 92 miles (148 km); Duluth, Minnesota)
- Rhinelander-Oneida County Airport (KRHI) (about 119 miles (192 km); Rhinelander, Wisconsin)

Other public use airports near Ashland:

- John F. Kennedy Memorial Airport (KASX) (about 2 miles (3.2 km); Ashland, Wisconsin)
- Madeline Island Airport (about 17 miles (27 km); La Pointe, Wisconsin)
- Cable Union Airport (about 37 miles (60 km); Cable, Wisconsin)
- Park Falls Municipal Airport (KPKF) (about 58 miles (93 km); Park Falls, Wisconsin)

=== Public transit ===
Local transportation is provided by the non-profit Bay Area Rural Transit (BART) system, which has bus stops throughout the community. Headquartered in Ashland's Industrial Park, BART also provides transportation to and from other communities in the Chequamegon Bay region, including Washburn, and Bayfield.

Intercity bus service to the city is provided by Indian Trails.

Northern Towns Transport is a regional car service and shuttle provider, connecting Ashland and the Chequamegon Bay area with downtown Minneapolis, Minnesota and Minneapolis-St. Paul International Airport; as well as the Twin Ports of Superior, Wisconsin / Duluth, Minnesota and Duluth International Airport.

== Churches ==
- Trinity Evangelical Lutheran Church of the Wisconsin Evangelical Lutheran Synod (WELS)
- Our Lady of the Lake Catholic Community
- Chequamegon Unitarian Universalist Fellowship
- Saron Lutheran Church
- Good Shepard Lutheran Church
- Zion Lutheran Church
- First English Lutheran Church
- Salem Baptist Church
- Lighthouse Baptist Church
- Church of Jesus Christ of Latter-Day Saints
- Kingdom Hall of Jehovah's Witnesses
- First Assembly of God Church
- Seventh-day Adventist Church
- United Methodist Church
- First Covenant Church
- Calvary Tabernacle United Pentecostal
- Celebration Fellowship
- United Presbyterian Congregational Church

== Arts and culture ==
The region is served by the Chequamegon Bay Arts Council, a non-profit organization promoting the arts in northern Wisconsin.

The Ashland Chamber Music Society is a volunteer organization that provides a venue for local and regional musicians to perform chamber music in the Ashland area.

The Bay Area Film Society is a group of film enthusiasts who sponsor the screening of classic films.

The Chequamegon Symphony Orchestra (CSO) provides orchestral concerts to the residents of northern Wisconsin.

== Recreation ==
Natural places in the vicinity include Lake Superior, the Whittlesey Creek National Wildlife Refuge, and the nearby Chequamegon-Nicolet National Forest.

=== Parks ===
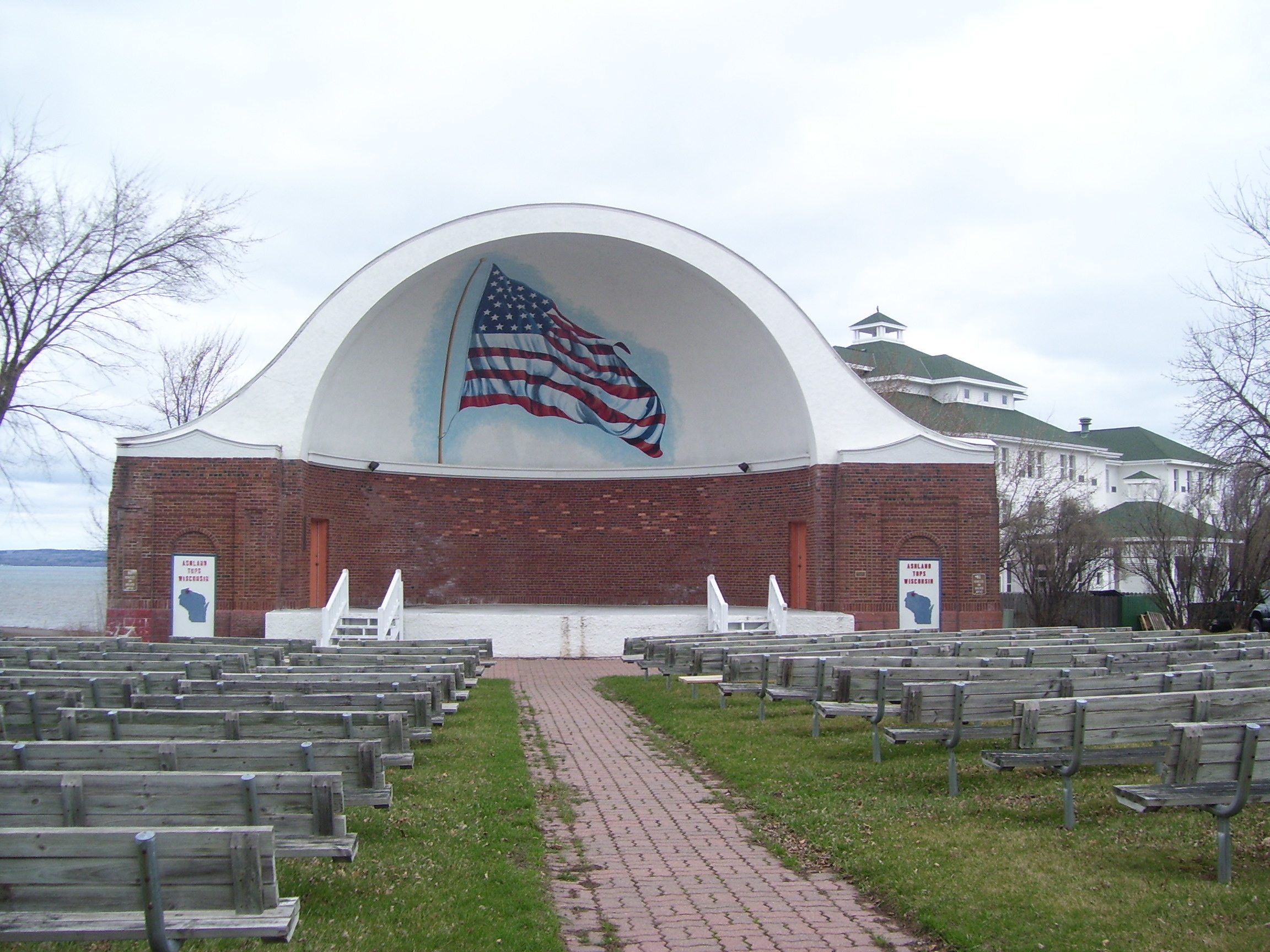
The Band Shell, located at Memorial Park, is a common summertime venue for outdoor music.

- Bayview Park, also known as Pamida Beach, contains a swimming beach, bathrooms, fishing pier, picnic area and playground. The 10-mile walking trail that loops Ashland connects to the park. Bayview Park is the only swim front in Ashland that provides lifeguards in the summer.
- Beaser Park
- Kreher Park, also known as Sunset Park, contains 33 RV campsites on lake Superior. The park has a swimming beach, playground, showers, dumping station, and firewood. The park connect to the Ashland Waterfront trail.
- Maslowski Beach features a shallow, sandy swimming beach, playground, pavilion, bathrooms, changing rooms, pay phone and artesian well. There is also access to Ashland's Lake Front Trail along Chequamegon Bay.
- Memorial Park contains a band shell.
- Menard Park
- Prentice Park is the largest of Ashland's 12 parks, at approximately 100 acres. It is a natural habitat for migrating birds, a nesting ground for mute swans, with hiking trails, artesian wells, a picnic area, a children's playground, and tent camping. Prentice park at one point had a deer herd that was domesticated.

=== Hiking and biking trails ===
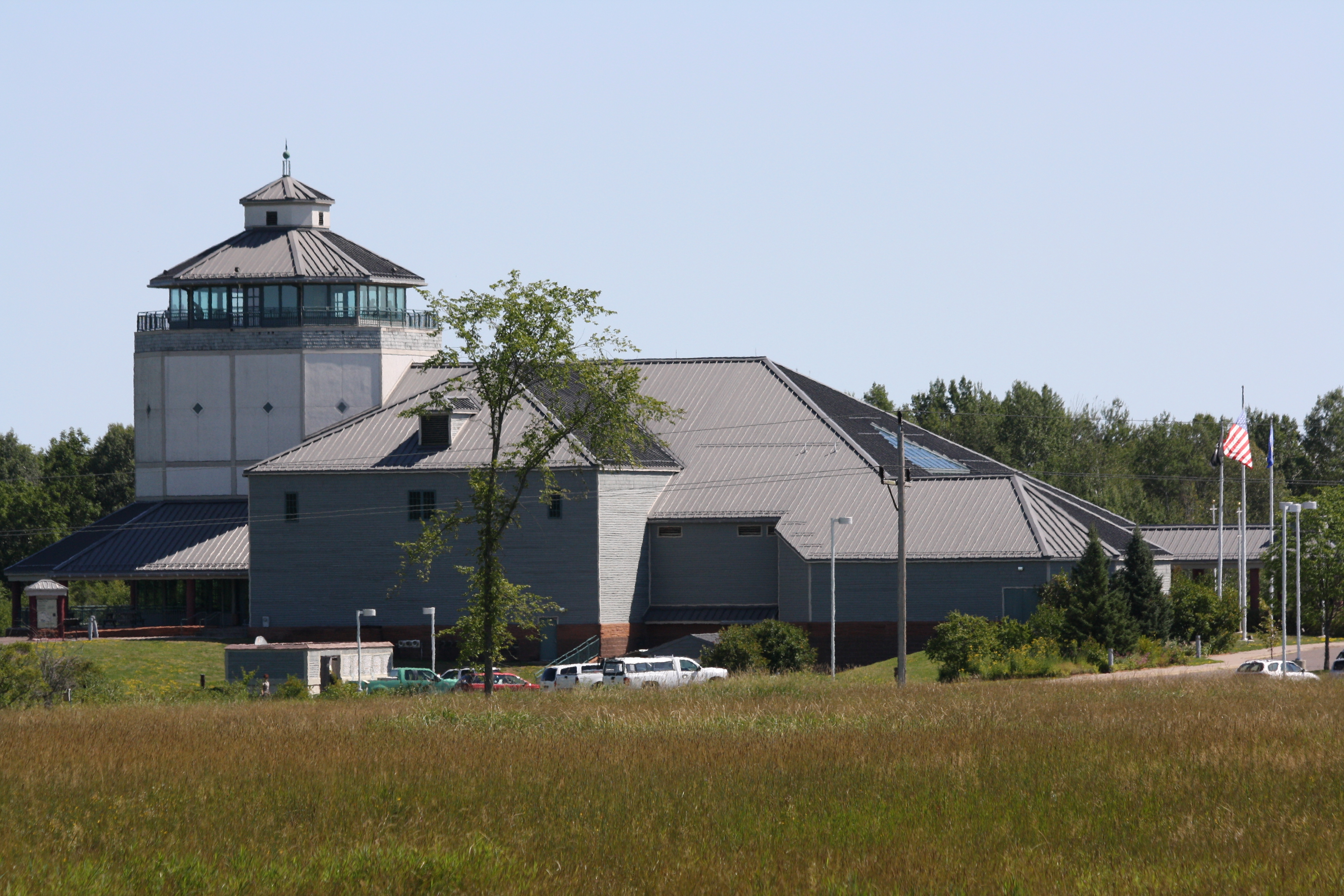
The Northern Great Lakes Visitor Center is located west of Ashland, along US 2. It houses a geographic and natural history museum, as well as a bookstore and archive office of the Wisconsin Historical Society.

- Tri-County Corridor
- Lakefront Trail, along Lake Superior
- A recreational trail loops around the entire city.
- North Country Trail

=== Boating ===
- Ashland Marina, located behind the Hotel Chequamegon

=== Camping ===
- RV camping is available at Prentice park, and Kreher Park.
- Tent camping is available at Prentice Park.

=== Local attractions ===
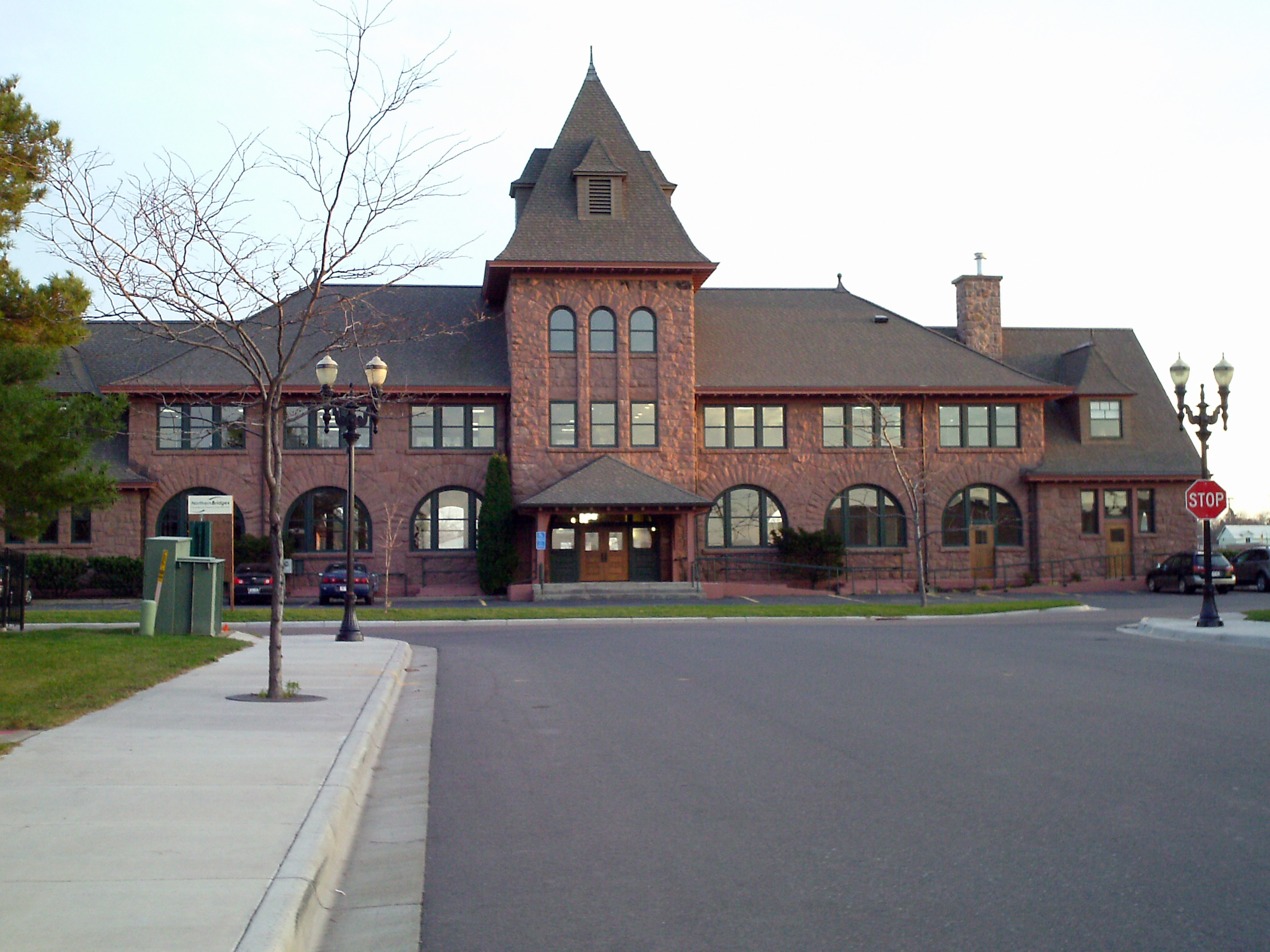
The Soo Line Depot

- Ashland Historical Museum
- Northern Great Lakes Visitor Center – a regional information center with natural history exhibits. A branch office of the Wisconsin Historical Society is located upstairs.
- The Chequamegon Theatre Association is located in the historic Rhinehart Theatre.
- Ashland Chequamegon Bay Golf Course

=== Events ===
- Bay Days is Ashland's annual community festival, held in the middle of July. In addition to street vendors and live outdoor music, it includes a "Strongest Man in the Bay Contest" and a Sprint Triathlon.
- The Book Across the Bay ski race is held every year in February. The course for the race crosses the frozen Chequamegon Bay of Lake Superior, starting in Ashland, and ending in Washburn.
- The WhistleStop Marathon and half-marathon is held every fall, and draws athletes from surrounding regions. The before-race events include a pasta feed, and live music that night.
- Live chamber music concerts performed by the Ashland Chamber Music Society
- The annual Red Clay Classics car race held at ABC Raceway
- The Ashland Area Farmer's Market is held weekly in the summer on Saturday mornings.
- Holiday parades include a Fourth of July parade, a Christmas parade, and a Homecoming parade.
- The Ashland County Fair is usually held in September at the fairgrounds in Marengo.
- The Chequamegon Bay Bird & Nature Festival is held in May.
- The Superior Vistas Bike Tour is held in June.
- Garland City Women's Expo is held in November.
- Chick-uamegon 5k & 10k run

== Notable people ==
- Ove H. Berg, Wisconsin state representative
- Janet Bewley, member of the Wisconsin Legislature
- Abe L. Biglow, Wisconsin state representative
- Bob Blake, NHL player
- Bob Brevak, racing driver
- F. Taylor Brown, U.S. Navy admiral
- Ray Callahan, MLB pitcher for the Cincinnati Reds
- John C. Chapple, Wisconsin state representative and newspaper editor
- Moose Cochran, NFL player
- Norm DeBriyn, former head coach of the Arkansas Razorbacks baseball team
- Sean Duffy, U.S. congressman, 20th Secretary of Transportation
- Sam Fifield, 14th lieutenant governor of Wisconsin, and noted businessman
- Moose Gardner, professional football player
- Bernard E. Gehrmann, Wisconsin state representative
- Jack Hall, labor organizer and trade unionist
- Morgan Hamm, Olympic medalist
- Paul Hamm, world champion gymnast, Olympic gold medalist
- Everis A. Hayes, U.S. representative from California
- Andrew R. Johnson (1856–1933), Louisiana state senator from 1916 to 1924 and mayor of Homer, Louisiana, lived in Ashland while working in the 1890s for the United States Land Office. In 1901, he named the village of Ashland, Louisiana, for Ashland, Wisconsin.
- John Kingston, Jr., Wisconsin state senator
- Jim Kisselburgh, football player
- Clarence A. Lamoreux, Wisconsin state senator
- Lawrence A. Lamoreux, Wisconsin state representative
- William D. Leahy, U.S. Navy Fleet Admiral, first military officer to reach a five-star rank; Chief of Naval Operations; governor of Puerto Rico; U.S. ambassador to France; White House Chief of Staff for Franklin D. Roosevelt and Harry S. Truman
- Michael A. McAuliffe, U.S. Air Force brigadier general
- Robert Bruce McCoy, U.S. National Guard major general
- George F. Merrill, Wisconsin state senator
- Jennifer Ouellette, science writer
- Sigurd F. Olson, author
- William Plizka, member of the Wisconsin Legislature
- Joe Rogalski, MLB player
- Albert W. Sanborn, Wisconsin state senator
- Fritz Scholder, Native American artist
- John C. Sibbald, Wisconsin state representative
- John W. Slaby, Wisconsin state representative
- Dave Suminski, NFL player
- John Szarkowski, photographer
- Daniel Theno, Wisconsin state senator, Ashland mayor
- A. Pearce Tomkins, Wisconsin state senator
- Harry P. Van Guilder, Wisconsin state representative
