= Wisconsin Highway 70 =

State Highway in Wisconsin, United States

State Trunk Highway 70
- WIS 70 highlighted in red

Route information
- Maintained by WisDOT
- Length: 246.49 mi (396.69 km)

Major junctions
- West end: MN 70 in Grantsburg
- US 63 in Spooner; US 53 in Spooner; US 51 in Woodruff; US 45 / WIS 17 / WIS 32 in Eagle River
- East end: US 2 / US 141 / WIS 101 in Florence

Location
- Country: United States
- State: Wisconsin
- Counties: Burnett, Washburn, Sawyer, Price, Oneida, Vilas, Forest, Florence

Highway system
- Wisconsin State Trunk Highway System; Interstate; US; State; Scenic; Rustic
| ← WIS 69 | → WIS 71 |

State Trunk Highway 70 (often called Highway 70, STH-70 or WIS 70) is a state highway in the U.S. state of Wisconsin. It runs east–west in northern Wisconsin from a shared terminus with WIS 101 at US Highway 2 (US 2) and US 141 near Florence to a connection with Minnesota State Highway 70 (MN 70) at the St. Croix River five miles (8.0 km) west of Grantsburg in Burnett County. It serves the communities of Grantsburg, Siren, Spooner, and the resort areas of Minocqua, Woodruff and Eagle River along its route. WIS 70 is the third-most northern route to almost completely cross Wisconsin (after US 2 and WIS 77), stretching from Minnesota to within four miles (6.4 km) of the Michigan border.

== Route description ==
The highway begins at a bridge over the St. Croix River as a continuation of MN 70, running east from it. At Grantsburg, the highway intersects WIS 87/WIS 48. The highway continues east from there, curving slightly south to avoid Mud Hen Lake before running northeast to meet WIS 35 in Siren. It then runs concurrently with WIS 35, running north from Siren before leaving the concurrency at a roundabout. The highway then runs east, passing through intersections with County Trunk Highway X (CTH-X), CTH-H, and CTH-O. It then passes through an intersection with US 63 in Spooner and an interchange with US 53 east of Spooner.

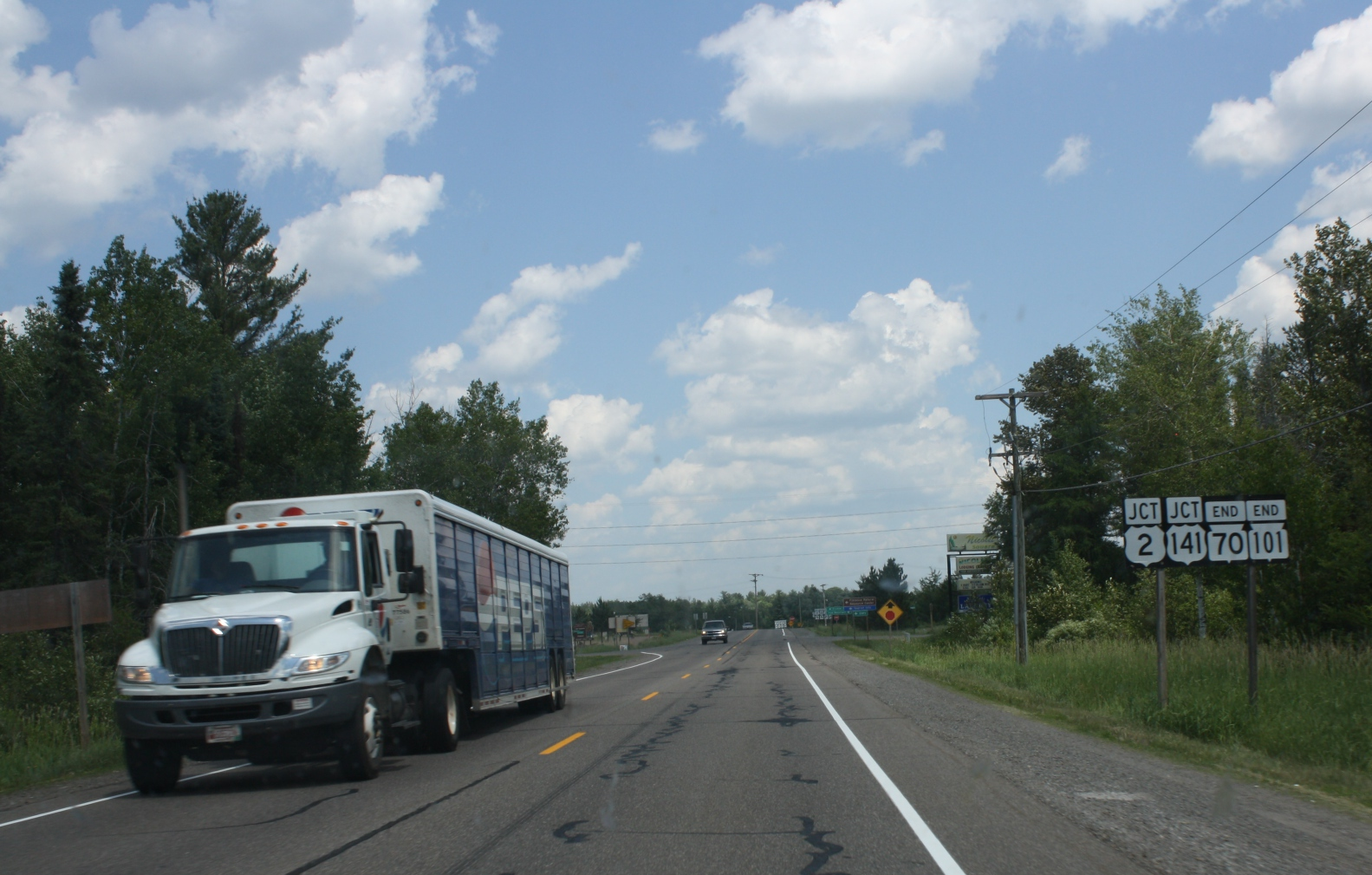
East terminus in Florence

The highway then continues running east before curving north through Stone Lake to reach WIS 27, with which the highway runs concurrently. It then passes through the Lac Courte Oreilles Reservation, where the highway starts following the Couderay River, and the village of Couderay before reaching WIS 40 in Radisson, where it starts following the Crooked Rapids, and the end of the WIS 27 concurrency in Ojibwa, where it stops following the Crooked Rapids. The highway then curves north, intersecting with CTH-B, CTH-GG, and CTH-M south of the Chequamegon-Nicolet National Forest. It then intersects with WIS 13 before entering the Riley Lake Wildlife Management Area, where the highway runs before exiting it and running east and concurrently with US 51 in Woodruff. In 2014, the average annual daily traffic on the highway west of US 51 was 4776, down from 5168 in 2008.

In Woodruff, the highway intersects WIS 47 and leaves the US 51 concurrency in Arbor Vitae, Wisconsin. It then runs east, intersecting with WIS 155 before following the Wisconsin River to Eagle River, where it runs concurrently with US 45. It then enters the Headwaters Wilderness, intersecting WIS 55 and running concurrently with WIS 139 within it. After exiting the wilderness, the highway continues east, intersecting and running concurrently with WIS 101 before terminating at US 2 in Florence.

== History ==
In 1914, much of the current route was unbuilt, though a section between Woodruff and Eagle River and a section east of Grantsburg had been constructed. In 1917, a short stub connecting WIS 35 to Grantsburg was assumed and designated as WIS 70. By the early 1920s, the highway had been extended east to WIS 32 (by 1935 part of US 45) in Eagle River. Throughout the 1920s and into the 1930s, the highway was the same and continued to be unpaved along the entire route. In 1931, the highway was extended west to a toll bridge over the St. Croix River. In 1934, a section of the highway northeast of Eagle River was designated. In 1935, the highway was paved in some sections. Between 1948 and 1956, the highway was extended east to Florence and the original section northeast of Eagle River had been redesignated as part of WIS 17.

== Major intersections ==
| County | Location | mi | km | Destinations | Notes |
|---|---|---|---|---|---|
| Burnett | Town of Grantsburg | 0.0 | 0.0 | MN 70 west – Rock Creek | Minnesota state line |
| Burnett | Grantsburg | 4.8 | 7.7 | WIS 48 east / WIS 87 south – Frederic, St. Croix Falls | |
| Burnett | Siren | 19.8 | 31.9 | WIS 35 south – Frederic | Southern end of WIS 35 concurrency |
| Burnett | Meenon–Siren line | 21.3 | 34.3 | WIS 35 north – Webster, Superior | Northern end of WIS 35 concurrency |
| Washburn | Spooner | 45.8 | 73.7 | US 63 – Hayward, Shell Lake, Cumberland | |
| Washburn | Town of Spooner | 47.5 | 76.4 | US 53 – Superior, Rice Lake | Interchange |
| Sawyer | Edgewater | 66.5 | 107.0 | WIS 27 north – Hayward | Western end of WIS 27 concurrency |
| Sawyer | Radisson | 84.1 | 135.3 | WIS 40 south / CTH-H north – Bruce | |
| Sawyer | Ojibwa | 89.6 | 144.2 | WIS 27 south / CTH-G north – Ladysmith | Eastern end of WIS 27 concurrency |
| Price | Fifield | 128.8 | 207.3 | WIS 13 – Park Falls, Phillips | |
| Oneida | No major junctions | | | | |
| Vilas | No major junctions | | | | |
| Oneida | Woodruff | 166.3 | 267.6 | US 51 south – Merrill, Wausau | Southern end of US 51 concurrency |
| Oneida | Woodruff | 167.0 | 268.8 | WIS 47 – Lac du Flambeau, Rhinelander | |
| Vilas | Arbor Vitae | 168.7 | 271.5 | US 51 north – Hurley | Northern end of US 51 concurrency |
| Vilas | St. Germain | 179.3 | 288.6 | WIS 155 north – Sayner | |
| Vilas | Lincoln | 190.1 | 305.9 | WIS 17 south – Rhinelander | Western end of WIS 17 concurrency |
| Vilas | Eagle River | 192.0 | 309.0 | US 45 north / WIS 17 north / WIS 32 north – Conover, Phelps | Eastern end of WIS 17 concurrency, western end of US 45 concurrency |
| Vilas | Lincoln | 193.4 | 311.2 | US 45 south / WIS 32 south – Three Lakes | Eastern end of US 45 concurrency |
| Forest | Alvin | 213.6 | 343.8 | WIS 55 – Iron River, Crandon | |
| Florence | Tipler | 222.2 | 357.6 | WIS 139 north – Iron River | Northern end of WIS 139 concurrency |
| Florence | Tipler | 225.0 | 362.1 | WIS 139 south – Long Lake | Southern end of WIS 139 concurrency |
| Florence | Commonwealth | 243.2 | 391.4 | WIS 101 south – Armstrong Creek | Western end of WIS 101 concurrency |
| Florence | Town of Florence | 245.6 | 395.3 | US 2 / US 141 / WIS 101 ends – Crystal Falls, Iron Mountain | Eastern end of WIS 101 concurrency, WIS 101 ends at this intersection |
1.000 mi = 1.609 km; 1.000 km = 0.621 mi: Concurrency terminus
