= Wisconsin Highway 35 =

Highway in Wisconsin

State Trunk Highway 35
- WIS 35; mainline in red, business route in blue

Route information
- Maintained by WisDOT
- Length: 412.15 mi (663.29 km)

Major junctions
- South end: IL 35 in Jamestown
- US 61 / US 151 in Dickeyville; US 61 / WIS 81 in Lancaster; US 18 / WIS 60 in Prairie du Chien; I-90 / US 53 in La Crosse; US 53 in Holmen; US 63 in Hager City; US 10 / WIS 29 in Prescott; I-94 / US 12 in Hudson; US 8 in St. Croix Falls; US 2 in Superior
- North end: I-535 / US 53 in Superior

Location
- Country: United States
- State: Wisconsin
- Counties: Grant, Crawford, Vernon, La Crosse, Trempealeau, Buffalo, Pepin, Pierce, St. Croix, Polk, Burnett, Douglas

Highway system
- Wisconsin State Trunk Highway System; Interstate; US; State; Scenic; Rustic
← WIS 34	→ WIS 36

State Trunk Highway 35 (STH-35, WIS 35) is a Wisconsin state highway running north–south across western Wisconsin. It is 412.15 miles in length, and is the longest state highway in Wisconsin. Portions of WIS 35 are part of the Great River Road.

== Route description ==
WIS 35 is a major north–south route through westernmost Wisconsin, often following close to the state border. Because of the lower population of counties along the state's western border with Iowa and Minnesota, it is a mostly rural routing with lower traffic counts than in other parts of the state. WIS 35 is also the terminus of 15 different state, US, and Interstate highways along its route.

=== Illinois state line to Prairie du Chien ===
The southern terminus of WIS 35 is at the Illinois–Wisconsin border, three miles (4.8 km) north of East Dubuque, Illinois. It continues on into that state as Illinois Route 35 (IL 35), which is the shortest state highway in Illinois.

From the state line, WIS 35 continues north for about a mile (1.6 km) before intersecting with WIS 11 at Badger Road. This section of highway is the only segment of WIS 35 between the state line and Prairie du Chien, with the exception of the stretch between WIS 81 and Bloomington, that is not co-signed with at least one other highway.

WIS 35/WIS 11 continues to the west to the interchange with U.S. Highway 61 (US 61) and US 151, as the two US Highways enter Wisconsin after crossing the Mississippi River from Dubuque, Iowa.

WIS 11 terminates at the Welcome Center on the other side of US 61/US 151, while WIS 35 continues north with the two US routes on an expressway to the city of Dickeyville. WIS 35 and US 61 exit the freeway to the northwest into Dickeyville at exit 8, while US 151 continues north towards Platteville.

WIS 35 and US 61 continue to the northwest to the village of Tennyson before heading north towards the city of Lancaster. On the outskirts of Lancaster, WIS 35 and US 61 interchange with WIS 81, which continues on into the city with the other two routes.

After intersecting with the southern terminus of WIS 129, the three routes enter Lancaster as Madison Street. In downtown Lancaster, at the Grant County Courthouse square, Madison Street becomes one-way northbound at Cherry Street. WIS 35 and WIS 81 turn left a block north at West Maple Street, while US 61 continues north on North Madison Street out of the city. On the west side of the Courthouse Square, WIS 35/WIS 81 turns south on South Jefferson Street for one block to West Cherry Street. The two state highways then head west for two blocks. At South Harrison Street, WIS 35/WIS 81 heads south for two blocks before turning southwest and out of the city.

About a mile (1.6 km) outside the city limits of Lancaster, WIS 35/WIS 81 turns in a westerly direction for about six miles (9.7 km) before the two highways split up in rural Grant County. WIS 81 continues southwest towards Beetown, while WIS 35 heads northwest toward the village of Bloomington.

On the northwest side of Bloomington, WIS 35 intersects with WIS 133 at 4th Street. The two highways continue in a generally northerly direction towards the village of Patch Grove, where they intersect with US 18. WIS 133 turns east with US 18, while WIS 35 continues towards the northwest with US 18 towards the Wisconsin River and Bridgeport.

Crossing the Wisconsin River into Crawford County, WIS 35/US 18 intersects with WIS 60 in Bridgeport, with the three highways continuing on into the city of Prairie du Chien as South Marquette Road.

=== Prairie du Chien to La Crosse ===
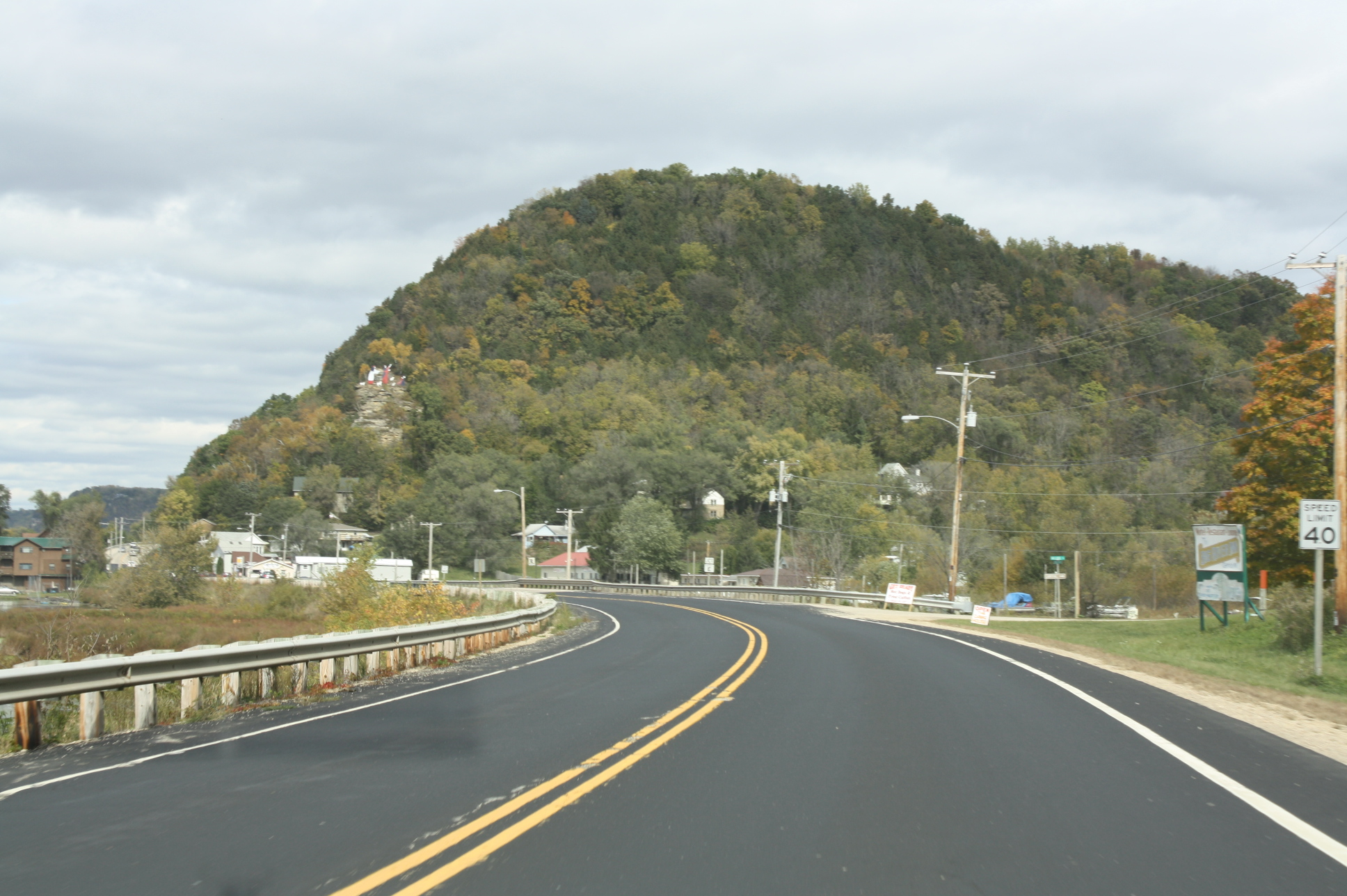
WIS 35 at Lynxville

At Wisconsin Street in downtown Prairie du Chien, US 18 and WIS 60 head west as a one-way street to the bridge crossing the Mississippi into Marquette, Iowa. Eastbound US 18 and WIS 60 joins WIS 35 one block prior at Iowa Street.

One block north of Wisconsin Street, WIS 35 meets the western terminus of WIS 27 at East Blackhawk Avenue. WIS 35 continues north out of the city, becoming the Great River Road. WIS 35 runs along the Mississippi River's east banks through the cities of Lynxville and Ferryville.

About three miles (4.8 km) south of the city of De Soto, WIS 35 intersects with the western segment of WIS 82, which crosses over the Mississippi River into the city of Lansing, Iowa. In downtown De Soto, WIS 82 heads to the Northeast as Main Street, while WIS 35 continues across the Vernon County line.

WIS 35 continues north along the eastern banks of the Mississippi River into the city of Genoa. Here, it meets another western terminus of a state highway, WIS 56 at Main Street. WIS 35 continues north to the city of Stoddard, where it meets yet another western terminus, this time of WIS 162 at Division Street. WIS 35 continues to the north and into La Crosse County.

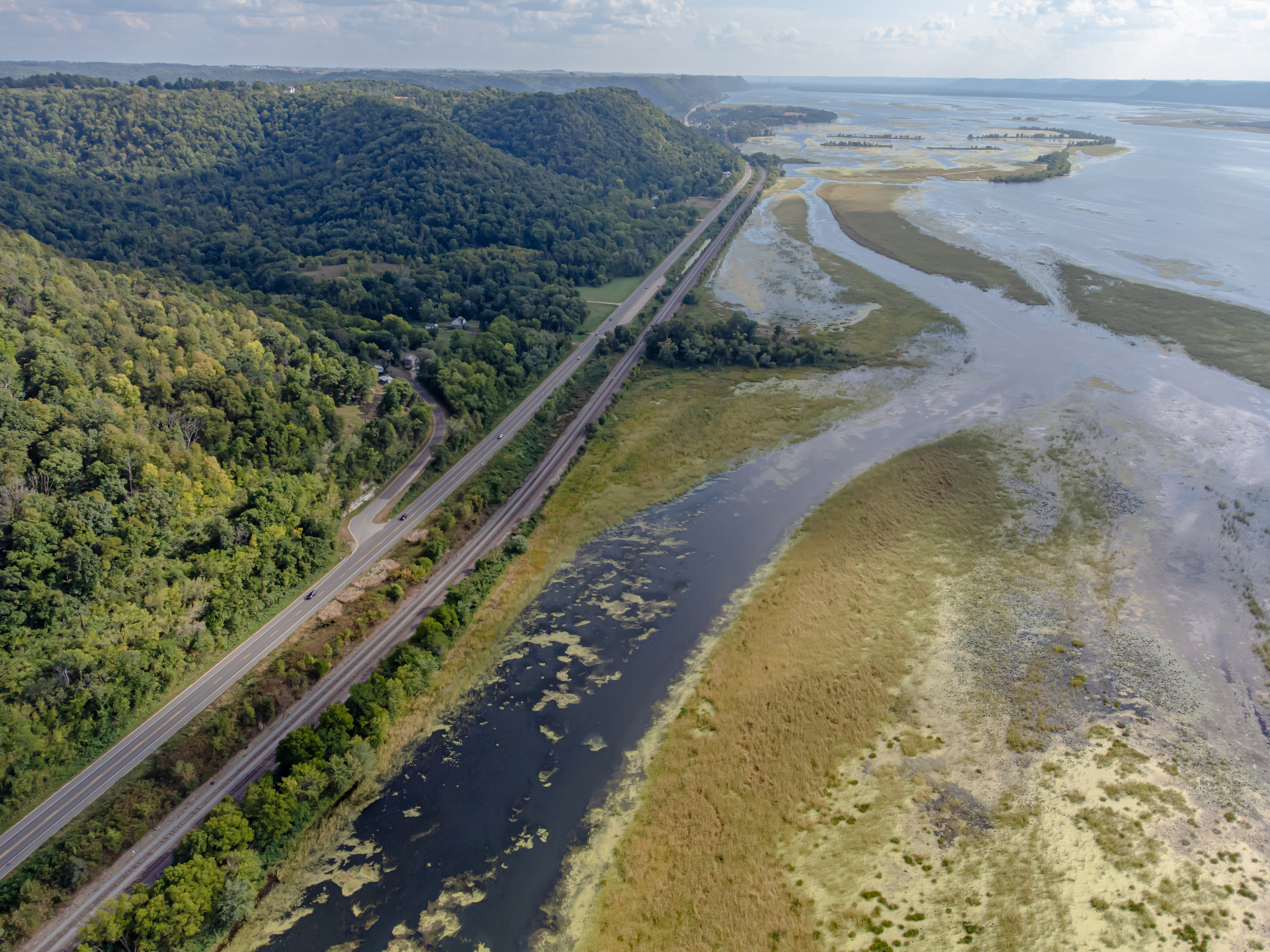
WIS 35 south of La Crosse looking south

Upon entering the southern edge of the city of La Crosse, WIS 35 interchanges with US 14 and US 61. The three routes continue into the city as Mormon Coulee Road. At Ward Avenue, the street name changes to South Avenue until it reaches West Avenue. At that intersection, northbound traffic for WIS 35 turns north onto West Avenue, while US 14/US 61 continue on South Avenue.

At La Crosse Street, the route intersects with WIS 16. North of La Crosse Street, West Avenue becomes Lang Drive, crossing over the La Crosse River. On the other side of the river, Lang Drive becomes George Street. WIS 35 continues north on George Street through North La Crosse before joining US 53 just south of exit 3 on Interstate 90.

=== La Crosse to Hudson ===
WIS 35 continues north on the Great River Road while US 53 heads east on I-90 for a mile (1.6 km) to exit 4. Upon entering the city of Onalaska, WIS 35 becomes Second Avenue.

WIS 35 continues along the eastern banks of the Mississippi River, running parallel to the US 53 freeway to the east before interchanging with it just south of Holmen. Business WIS 35 continues north into Holmen as County Trunk Highway HD (CTH-HD, Holmen Drive), while WIS 35 and US 53 bypass the city to the west.

On the north side of Holmen, WIS 35 leaves the freeway and turns west back towards the river, while US 53 continues north with WIS 93. WIS 93 south terminates at the interchange with WIS 35. About two miles (3.2 km) west of the US 53 interchange, WIS 35 crosses the Black River into Trempealeau County.

WIS 35 enters the village of Trempealeau on Third Street before turning north on Main Street on the western edge of downtown Trempealeau. WIS 35 continues north to its intersection with WIS 54 and WIS 93. WIS 93 continues north while WIS 35/WIS 54 heads west, crossing into Buffalo County into the unincorporated community of East Winona.

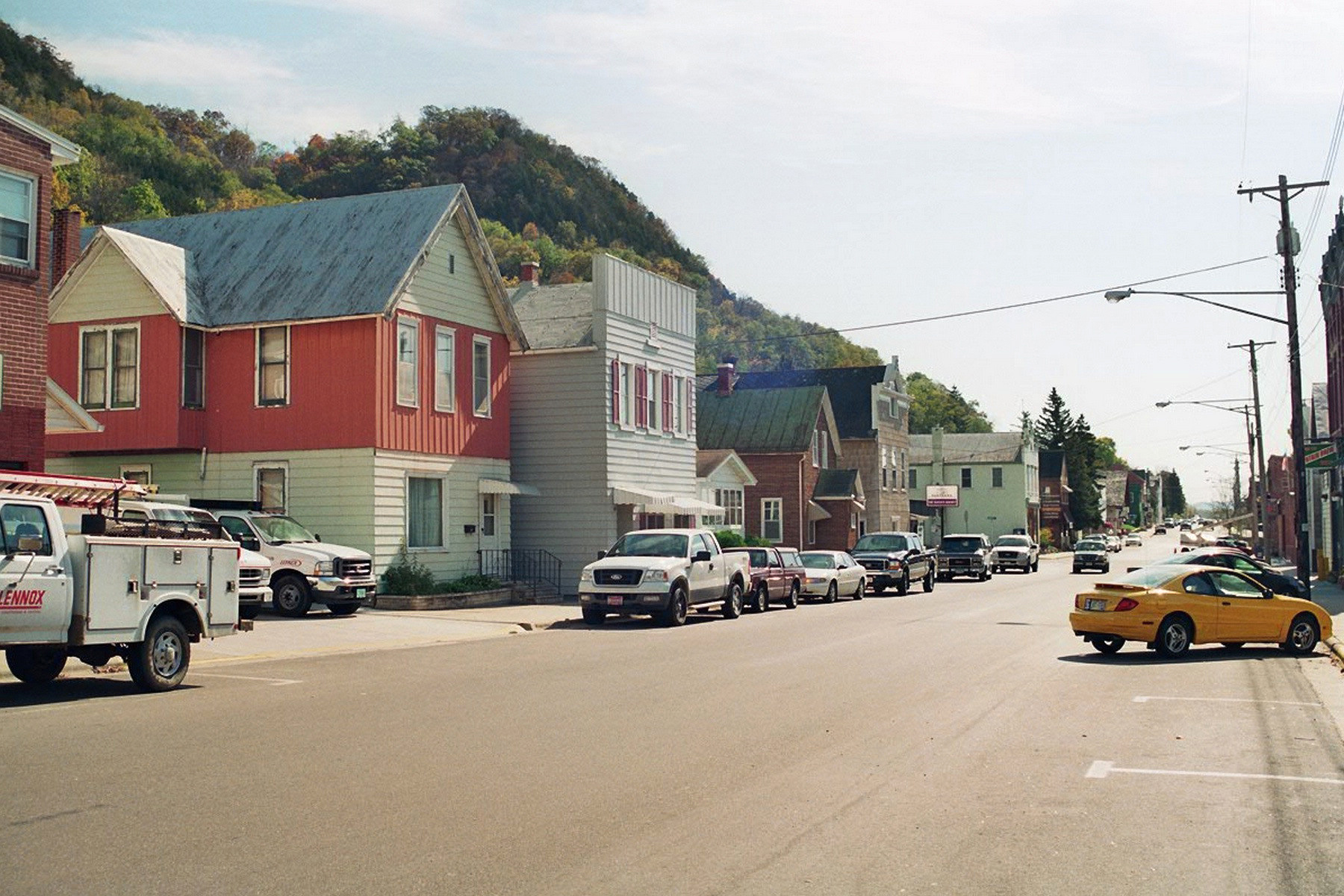
WIS 35 through downtown Fountain City

In East Winona, WIS 54 turns south and crosses the river into Winona, Minnesota, where it becomes Minnesota State Highway 43 (MN 43). WIS 35 continues along the eastern banks of the Mississippi River as the Great River Road, into Fountain City. Upon entering the city limits, WIS 35 becomes Main Street, before turning slightly northwest on South Shore Drive at Eagle Street.

On the north side of Fountain City, WIS 35 intersects with the western terminus of WIS 95 at North Street. WIS 35 continues north as North Shore Drive to the city limits. About two miles (3.2 km) northwest of Fountain City, WIS 35 passes the entrance to Merrick State Park.

WIS 35 continues northwest to its intersection with the southern terminus of WIS 88 outside the unincorporated community of Czechville. About three and a half miles (5.6 km) to the northwest, WIS 35 enters the city of Cochrane. WIS 35 misses Buffalo City by about one-mile (1.6 km) to the east, along the Belvidere Ridge of West Central Wisconsin.

WIS 35 continues along the Mississippi River banks into the city of Alma. North of Alma, WIS 35 intersects with the western terminus of yet another state highway, WIS 37. WIS 35 continues into the city of Nelson, where it intersects with WIS 25.

WIS 25/WIS 35 continues north out of Nelson, curving to the west after their intersection with CTH-D. About half a mile (0.8 km) from CTH-D, WIS 25 turns due north while WIS 35 continues west as the Great River Road, crossing the Chippewa River into Pepin County.

About three miles (4.8 km) west of the Chippewa River, WIS 35 enters the community of Pepin. Continuing its route along the Mississippi, WIS 35 goes through the community of Stockholm and turns to the north along the river banks before entering Pierce County.

In Pierce County, WIS 35 goes through the small community of Maiden Rock, Warrentown and Bay City. On the western end of Bay City, WIS 35 passes Red Wing Regional Airport, a municipal airport that serves the city of Red Wing, Minnesota on the other side of the Mississippi River.

About two miles (3.2 km) from the airport, WIS 35 crosses US 63, just east of Hager City. US 63 continues north towards Ellsworth, while WIS 35 continues to the northwest through Diamond Bluff and into the city of Prescott, as Jefferson Street.

In downtown Prescott, WIS 35 intersects with US 10 at Cherry Street, just northeast of the confluence of the St. Croix and Mississippi rivers. US 10 westbound heads northeast across the mouth of the St. Croix into Minnesota as Point Douglas Drive, while WIS 35 and US 10 eastbound run north for about 11 blocks as Lake Street North to Cedar Street.

At Campbell Street North, WIS 35 turns to the northeast as US 10 continues east to start its long journey across the state of Wisconsin. The intersection of the two highways is also the western terminus of WIS 29, one of the main arterial routes connecting the Twin Cities area with Green Bay.

WIS 35/WIS 29 turns in a northeasterly direction into the city of River Falls, where it makes a right turn on to Cemetery Road, and hugs the City of River Falls southern boundary. When the two highways meet WIS 65 at a roundabout, the three highways continue north to the intersection of Cascade Avenue, where WIS 29 continues east out of the city. This recent re-routing shortened WIS 35 by about 0.1 miles (0.16 km).

WIS 35/WIS 65 continues north as a limited-access expressway across the county line into St. Croix County. At the north end of North Main Street in River Falls, WIS 65 heads to the northeast while WIS 35 continues to the northwest as a four-lane divided highway, all the way to its interchange with I-94 at exit 3, east of Hudson.

=== Hudson to St. Croix Falls ===
WIS 35 and US 12 head west with I-94 towards the St. Croix River and the Minnesota state line. At exit 1, WIS 35 exits from the freeway and heads north into the city of Hudson on Second Street. Crossing over the mouth of the Willow River, west of Lake Mallalieu, WIS 35 enters North Hudson as Sixth Street North.

Heading north out of the city, WIS 35 continues its route as a river-side highway, this time along the banks of the St. Croix into the city of Houlton. At Houlton, WIS 35 intersects with WIS 64, which runs for about a mile (1.6 km) to the southwest across the St. Croix River on the St. Croix Crossing bridge into Stillwater, Minnesota, where it becomes MN 36.

WIS 35/WIS 64 heads northeast out of the city of Houlton as a divided highway towards the city of Somerset. On the far southwestern side of the city, WIS 35/WIS 64 becomes a limited-access freeway that bypasses downtown Somerset. On the southeast side of the city, WIS 35 exits onto the eastern half of Business WIS 64, heading west and back into the city of Somerset.

WIS 35 turns to the north, about a block east of the Apple River, onto Church Hill Road. WIS 35 continues north out of the city, crossing over the county line into Polk County about seven miles (11 km) to the north.

After passing through the unincorporated town of East Farmington, WIS 35 continues on to the city of Osceola as Cascade Street. After crossing under a railroad bridge for the Osceola and St. Croix Valley Railway, WIS 35 intersects with the eastern terminus of WIS 243. This is one of only two eastern termini that WIS 35 intersects on its route through the state. WIS 243 is the shortest regularly-signed highway in Wisconsin, as it runs the length of Osceola Road over the St. Croix River to MN 243 in Franconia Township, Chisago County, Minnesota. The length of the highway in Wisconsin is only 0.3 miles (0.48 km).

WIS 35 swings to the northeast on North Cascade Street through downtown Osceola, then out of the city. Passing Osceola Bedrock Glades State Natural Area, WIS 35 continues north towards the village of Dresser on its way to St. Croix Falls.

=== St. Croix Falls to Superior ===
Just outside the city of St. Croix Falls, WIS 35 heads east with US 8 on a limited-access expressway for about three and a half miles (5.6 km). In St. Croix Falls township, WIS 35 turns to the north while US 8 continues east to Turtle Lake.

WIS 35 continues north through the small towns of Centuria, Milltown and Luck. On the east side of Milltown, WIS 35 intersects with the western terminus of WIS 46 after the latter crosses the Gandy Dancer State Bicycle Trail. At First Avenue in Luck, WIS 35 intersects with WIS 48, which heads to the east along the northern edge of town. WIS 48 turns to the north with WIS 35, continuing into Frederic where WIS 48 turns west on West Oak Street.

WIS 35 continues on a northeastern route, through the unincorporated town of Lewis and across the county line into Burnett County.

In Burnett County, WIS 35 enters Siren, where it intersects with WIS 70 as Second Avenue at CTH-B. WIS 35/WIS 70 continues north out of the village limits to the Burnett County Airport. At the southern edge of the airport, WIS 70 heads east on Airport Road, while WIS 35 continues its northerly route. Passing through Webster, WIS 35 heads north toward Danbury.

WIS 35 passes Danbury to the east, intersecting with WIS 77 at Main Street East. WIS 35/WIS 77 continues to the north, coming within 148 yards (135 m) from the Minnesota border at the mouth of the Yellow River. This segment is the 23rd different state trunk highway that shares its routing with WIS 35 in the state. About a mile and a half (2.4 km) northwest, WIS 77 heads east while WIS 35 continues to the northeast, crossing the Big Island State Natural Area and the St. Croix River and turning north into Douglas County.

Continuing north, WIS 35 passes through the unincorporated towns of Dairyland, Moose Junction, and Chaffey before entering Pattison State Park. WIS 35 crosses over the Manitou Falls Spillway in the park before turning northward to Superior.

WIS 35 enters Superior as Tower Avenue, running north through the South End neighborhood of the city. At 61st Street/Central Avenue, WIS 35 reaches the eastern terminus of WIS 105, the only other eastern terminus of a state highway that intersects with the route.

WIS 35 continues north into Superior, passing Richard I. Bong Airport into the downtown area. At Belknap Street, WIS 35 crosses US 2 at Center City Park. WIS 35 continues north for 12 blocks before turning east onto North Third Street.

WIS 35 turns east for four blocks, ending at both Hughitt Avenue and Hammond Avenue, at the foot of the John A. Blatnik Bridge across the Saint Louis Bay. The bridge takes I-535/US 53 over the bay to Duluth, Minnesota. I-535's southern terminus is also WIS 35's northern terminus.

== History ==
WIS 35 was established in 1918 as a route between Saint Croix Falls and Danbury, Wisconsin. The highway was extended south to Somerset by 1921 and north to Superior shortly thereafter. A few years later it was expanded south to the Illinois border. In October 2013, Wisconsin WIS 35 between Ferryville, Wisconsin and Prairie du Chien, Wisconsin was renamed in honor of former Governor of Wisconsin Patrick Lucey.

== Major intersections ==
County	Location	mi	km	Destinations	Notes
Grant	Town of Jamestown	0	0.0	IL 35 south – East Dubuque	Continuation into Illinois
Grant	Town of Jamestown			WIS 11 east – Hazel Green	Southern end of WIS 11 overlap
Grant	Town of Jamestown			US 61 south / US 151 south / WIS 11 ends – Dubuque	Interchange; northern end of WIS 11 overlap; southern end of US 61 and US 151 overlaps; WIS 35 south follows exit 1
Grant	Town of Jamestown			Badger Road / Eagle Point Road	Interchange; northbound exit and southbound entrance; US 151 exit 2
Grant	Town of Jamestown			Eagle Point Road / Badger Road	Interchange; no northbound exit; US 151 exit 3
Grant	Kieler	4	6.4	CTH-H / CTH-HHH – Kieler	Interchange; northbound exit and southbound entrance; US 151 exit 5
Grant	Kieler			CTH-H to CTH-HHH – Kieler	Interchange; southbound exit and northbound entrance; US 151 exit 5
Grant	Town of Paris			US 151 north / CTH-HH – Madison, Cuba City	interchange; northern end of US 151 overlap; WIS 35 north follows exit 8
Grant	Tennyson	10	16	WIS 133 north / Great River Road north / CTH-O – Potosi, Cassville	Northern end of Great River Road overlap
Grant	Town of South Lancaster			WIS 81 east – Platteville	Southern end of WIS 81 overlap
Grant	Town of South Lancaster			Truck US 61 north / WIS 129 north – Fennimore	Bypass of Lancaster
Grant	Lancaster	19	31	US 61 north – Readstown	Northern end of US 61 overlap; traffic circle around Grant County Courthouse
Grant	Town of Beetown			WIS 81 west – Cassville	Northern end of WIS 81 overlap
Grant	Bloomington	26	42	CTH-A east	southern end of CTH A overlap
Grant	Bloomington			WIS 133 south / CTH-A west – Cassville	northern end of CTH A overlap; southern end of WIS 133 overlap
Grant	Town of Patch Grove			US 18 east / WIS 133 north – Boscobel, Fennimore, Madison	Northern end of WIS 133 overlap; southern end of US 18 overlap
Grant	Town of Wyalusing			Great River Road south / CTH-C – Wyalusing State Park	Southern end of Great River Road overlap
Wisconsin River				Bridgeport Bridge	
Crawford	Bridgeport			WIS 60 east – Wauzeka	Southern end of WIS 60 overlap
Crawford	Prairie du Chien			US 18 west / WIS 60 west – Marquette	Northern end of US 18 and WIS 60 overlaps
Crawford	Prairie du Chien			WIS 27 south (East Wisconsin Street) – Marquette	southern end of WIS 27 overlap
Crawford	Prairie du Chien			WIS 27 north (East Blackhawk Avenue) – Eastman	northern end of WIS 27 overlap
Crawford	Town of Seneca			WIS 171 east – Mount Sterling, Gays Mills	
Crawford	Town of Freeman			WIS 82 west – Lansing	Southern end of WIS 82 overlap
Crawford	DeSoto			WIS 82 east – Viroqua	Northern end of WIS 82 overlap
Vernon	Genoa			WIS 56 east – Viroqua	
Vernon	Stoddard			WIS 162 north – Chaseburg	
La Crosse	La Crosse			US 14 east / US 61 south – Coon Valley, Madison, Guadalupe Shrine	Southern end of US 14 and US 61 overlaps
La Crosse	La Crosse			US 14 west / US 61 north / Great River Road north (South Avenue) – Business District, La Crescent	Northern end of US 14, US 61, and Great River Road overlaps
La Crosse	La Crosse			WIS 33 (Jackson Street) – Cashton	
La Crosse	La Crosse			WIS 16 (La Crosse Street) – Business District, West Salem	
La Crosse	La Crosse			US 53 south / Great River Road south / Alt. I-90 west (Rose Street) – Business District	Southern end of US 53 / Great River Road / I-90 Alt. overlap
La Crosse	La Crosse			I-90 / US 53 north – Airport, Minnesota, Madison	I-90 exit 3; northern end of US 53 overlap
La Crosse	Onalaska			WIS 157 east (Main Street)	
La Crosse	Town of Onalaska			CTH-OT / Alt. I-90 east – Midway, National Wildlife Refuge Visitor Center	northern end of I-90 Alt. overlap
La Crosse	Holmen			US 53 south / CTH-HD north (Holmen Drive) / Bus. WIS 35 north / Great River Road north – Onalaska, Holmen	interchange; northern end of Great River Road overlap; southern end of US 53 overlap
La Crosse	Town of Holland			CTH-MH (McHugh Road)	Interchange
La Crosse	Town of Holland			US 53 north / WIS 93 north / CTH-HD south / Bus. WIS 35 south / Great River Road south – Galesville, Holmen	Interchange; northern end of US 53 overlap; southern end of Great River Road overlap
Trempealeau	Centerville			WIS 54 east / WIS 93 – Arcadia, Galesville	Southern end of WIS 54 overlap
Buffalo	Town of Buffalo			WIS 54 west – Winona	Northern end of WIS 54 overlap
Buffalo	Fountain City			WIS 95 east – Arcadia	
Buffalo	Czechville			WIS 88 north – Gilmanton	
Buffalo	Alma			WIS 37 north – Mondovi	
Buffalo	Nelson			WIS 25 south – Wabasha	Southern end of WIS 25 overlap
Buffalo	Town of Nelson			WIS 25 north – Durand	Northern end of WIS 25 overlap
Pepin	Pepin			CTH-CC north – Spring Valley	former WIS 183 north
Pierce	Town of Trenton			US 63 – Red Wing, Ellsworth	
Pierce	Prescott			US 10 west / Great River Road north	northern end of Great River Road overlap; southern end of US 10 overlap
Pierce	Prescott			US 10 east – Ellsworth	Northern end of US 10 overlap; southern end of WIS 29 overlap
Pierce	River Falls			WIS 65 south – Ellsworth	southern end of WIS 65 overlap
Pierce	River Falls			WIS 29 east – Spring Valley	Northern end of WIS 29 overlap
St. Croix	River Falls			WIS 65 north / Main Street – River Falls	Interchange; northern end of WIS 65 overlap
St. Croix	Town of Troy			Chapman Drive	Interchange
St. Croix	Hudson			Hanley Road	interchange
St. Croix	Town of Hudson			I-94 east / US 12 east – Eau Claire	Interchange; southern end of I-94 and US 12 overlaps; WIS 35 south follows exit 3
St. Croix	Hudson			CTH-F (Carmichael Road)	interchange; I-94 exit 2
St. Croix	Hudson			I-94 west / US 12 west / Alt. WIS 64 west – St. Paul	Interchange; northern end of I-94 and US 12 overlaps; southern end of I-94 Alt. / WIS 64 Alt. overlap; WIS 35 north follows exit 1
St. Croix	Hudson			Alt. I-94 east (Coulee Road)	northern end of I-94 Alt. overlap
St. Croix	Houlton			WIS 64 west	northern end of WIS 64 Alt. overlap; southern end of WIS 64 overlap
St. Croix	Town of Somerset			CTH-V (Anderson Scout Camp Road)	Interchange
St. Croix	Town of Somerset			Bus. WIS 64 east / CTH-VV – Somerset	Interchange
St. Croix	Town of Somerset			WIS 64 east / CTH-C north – New Richmond, Cedar Lake Speedway	Interchange; northern end of WIS 64 overlap; southern end of WIS 64 Bus. overlap
St. Croix	Town of Somerset			Bus. WIS 64 west / CTH-VV – Houlton	northern end of WIS 64 Bus. overlap
Polk	Osceola			WIS 243 west to MN 95	
Polk	St. Croix Falls			US 8 west / WIS 87 north – St. Croix Falls Business District, Twin Cities	interchange; southern end of US 8 overlap
Polk	Town of St. Croix Falls			US 8 east – Turtle Lake	Northern end of US 8 overlap
Polk	Milltown			WIS 46 south – Balsam Lake, Polk County Historical Museum	
Polk	Luck			WIS 48 east – Cumberland, Business District	Southern end of WIS 48 overlap
Polk	Frederic			WIS 48 west – Grantsburg	Northern end of WIS 48 overlap
Burnett	Siren			WIS 70 west / CTH-B east – Grantsburg	Southern end of WIS 70 overlap
Burnett	Siren–Meenon town line			WIS 70 east – Spooner	Northern end of WIS 70 overlap
Burnett	Danbury			WIS 77 west – Hinckley, Business District	Southern end of WIS 77 overlap
Burnett	Town of Swiss			WIS 77 east – Webb Lake, Minong	Northern end of WIS 77 overlap
Douglas	Superior			WIS 105 west (Central Avenue / North 61st Street) – Oliver, Superior Municipal Forest	
Douglas	Superior			US 2 (Belknap Street) to LSCT / I-35	
Douglas	Superior			Truck US 2 (Winter Street)	
Douglas	Superior			I-535 north / US 53 to US 2 east – Duluth	
1.000 mi = 1.609 km; 1.000 km = 0.621 mi: Concurrency terminus; Incomplete access

== Business route ==
Business State Trunk Highway 35
- Location: Holmen
- Length: 4.1 mi (6.6 km)
- Existed: c. 1990–present

Business State Trunk Highway 35 (Bus. WIS 35) in Holmen follows the former alignment of WIS 35, after the highway was realigned in 1990.
