= Tornado outbreak of June 18, 2001 =

Extreme weather event in US Upper Midwest and Florida

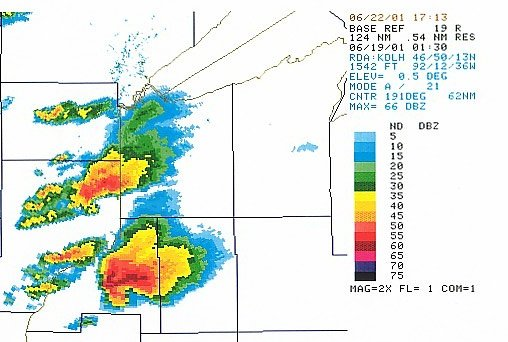
- Radar image of the Siren Supercell (bottom left) at 8:30 CST.

Meteorological history
- Date: June 18, 2001

Tornado outbreak
- Tornadoes: 6
- Max. rating: F3 tornado
- Duration: ~6 hours, 25 minutes

Overall effects
- Casualties: 2 fatalities, 16 injuries
- Damage: ~$22.6 million
- Areas affected: Florida, Upper Midwest
- Part of the tornado outbreaks of 2001

On June 18, 2001, a small, but fatal tornado outbreak occurred across the Upper Midwest as well as Florida. The outbreak spawned a long-tracked F3 tornado that killed three people, and caused approximately US$10 million in damage. The tornado struck Siren, Wisconsin, a small village whose only siren was malfunctioning when the tornado moved through. Other less damaging tornadoes were confirmed in Florida, Iowa, Minnesota and Nebraska. Following the outbreak, areas affected by the Wisconsin tornado received financial assistance from local and federal authorities.

== Meteorological synopsis ==
After a brief F0 tornado touched down in Florida, meteorological conditions during the evening hours of June 18, 2001 rapidly began to deteriorate across the Upper Midwest. At 7 PM CDT (0000 UTC) an occluding cyclone was present over Northeast Minnesota, while a secondary front was located to its south. A zonally oriented warm front extended from the southern low, while a north–south cold front was located near the low pressure. Cape values in Iowa were between the 3000 to 4500 J/kg range, and conditions were starting to deteriorate there as well. By early evening a line of thunderstorms began to develop along the cold front across Eastern Nebraska and Iowa, and extended up into Minnesota. The first tornado of the outbreak happened at 7:22 PM CDT (0022) near the town of Day, Minnesota. The tornado was rated an F1, and cut a path 8 miles (12.9 km) long through mostly rural areas. At 7:36 PM CDT (0036 UTC) the second tornado of the outbreak, an F0, made a brief touchdown near Tekamah, Nebraska. Some of the Iowa storms also rapidly developed into severe thunderstorms. At 7:59 PM CDT (0059 UTC) Harrison County fire and rescue reported that a tornado had touchdown near Modale. The F0 was on the ground only briefly before lifting. In Wisconsin, convection with was firing up near the Minnesota state border, and an "Enhanced-V" signature became evident on one cell. At 8:06 PM CDT (0106 UTC) an F3 touched down East-Northeast of Grantsburg. The tornado continued in an eastward direction moving through the towns of Alpha, Falun and Siren. The tornado moved into Washburn County, where it eventually dissipated near Spooner. The last tornado of the outbreak occurred near Glidden, Iowa. It was rated an F0. Many other storms also caused hail and wind reports across the Midwest, in association with this outbreak.

== Confirmed tornadoes ==
Confirmed tornadoes by Fujita rating
FU	F0	F1	F2	F3	F4	F5	Total
0	4	1	0	1	0	0	6

=== June 18 event ===
List of confirmed tornadoes – Monday, June 18, 2001 (Note: All dates are based on the local time zone where the tornado touched down; however, all times are in Coordinated Universal Time for consistency.) (Note: Prior to 1994, only the average widths of tornado paths were officially listed.)
F#	Location	County / Parish	State	Start coord.	Time (UTC)	Path length	Max. width	Summary	Refs.
F0	NE of Buckville	Lafayette	FL	30.15°N 83.25°W	20:00–?	0.1 miles (0.16 km)	50 yards (46 m)	Damages were estimated at $70,000 from this brief tornado.	
F1	E of Day	Isanti, Kanabec	MN	45.43°N 93.21°W	00:22–?	8.3 miles (13.4 km)	—N/a	Tornado touchdown confirmed, two barns destroyed, a dozen outbuildings damaged. Damages reached $200,000.	
F0	E of Craig	Burt	NE	41.47°N 96.19°W	00:36–?	0.1 miles (0.16 km)	20 yards (18 m)	Brief touchdown in open country; no damage caused.	
F0	N of Modale	Harrison	IA	41.39°N 96.01°W	00:59–?	0.2 miles (0.32 km)	25 yards (23 m)	Brief touchdown in open country; no damage caused.	
F3	E of Grantsburg to Siren to W of Spooner	Burnett, Washburn	WI	45.47°N 92.39°W	01:06–?	34 miles (55 km)	880 yards (800 m)	2 deaths – See section on this tornado – 16 people were injured.	
F0	Glidden	Carroll	IA	42.03°N 94.44°W	02:25–?	0.2 miles (0.32 km)	30 yards (27 m)	Brief touchdown in open country. There was $1,000 in crop damage caused.	

=== Siren, Wisconsin ===
Siren, Wisconsin
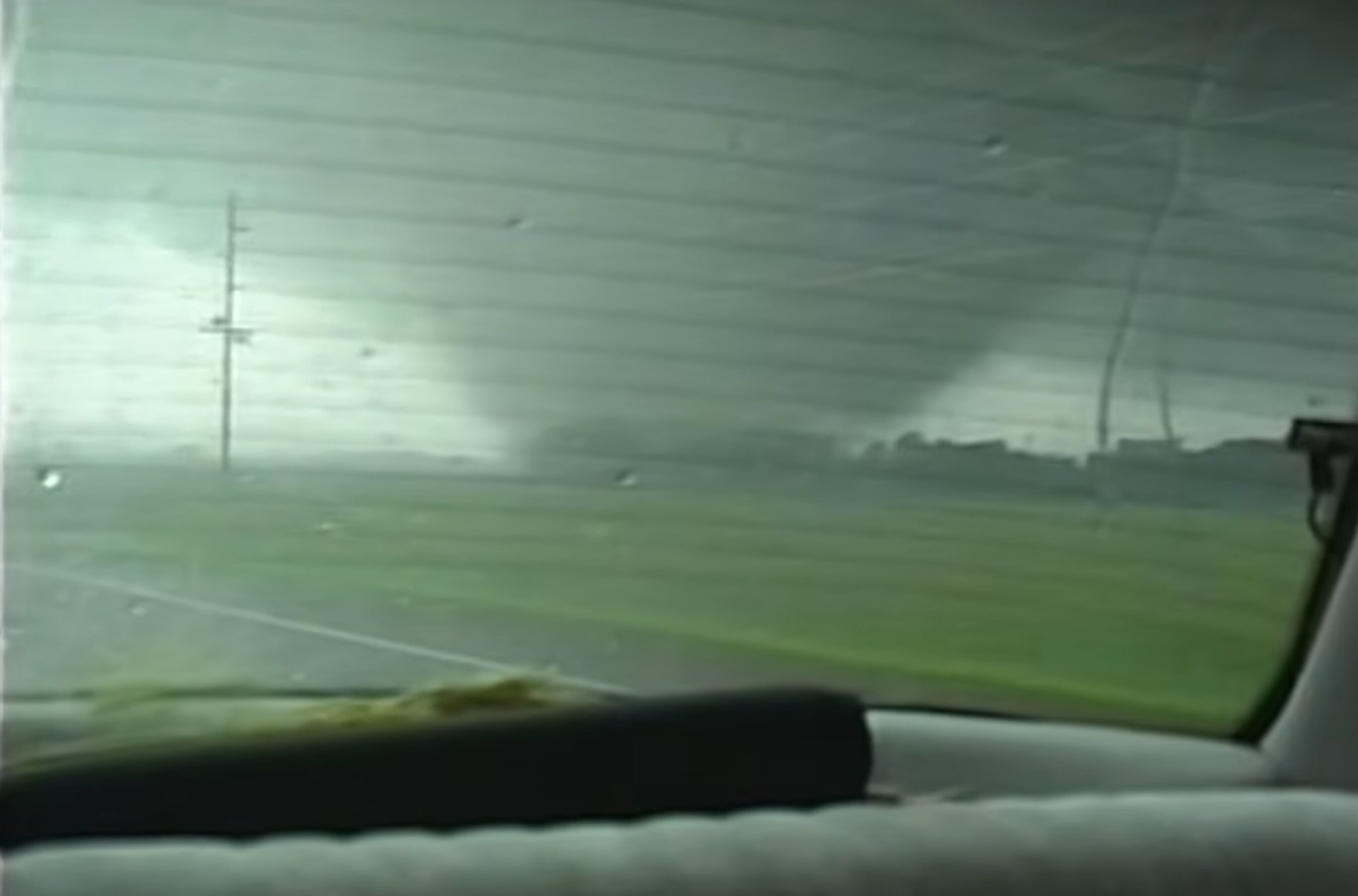
- The tornado shortly after formation

F3 tornado
- on the Fujita scale

Overall effects
- Casualties: 2 fatalities, 16 injuries

The Siren tornado was the outbreak's only fatal storm, killing two people and injuring another 16. Damage from the tornado was estimated at US$10 million. The tornado caused the most damage in the village of Siren, where most structures were completely destroyed. 240 buildings were damaged or destroyed by the tornado, and over 100 firefighters helped rescue people trapped in buildings and clean up. Residents reported cows and other livestock flying through the air during the tornado. Despite a tornado warning being issued, Siren's only civil defense siren failed as a result of a lightning strike in April or May. Police took to the streets, sounding their horns and shouting warnings to local residents. The siren system had been scheduled to be repaired the following week.

== Aftermath ==
Following the Siren tornado, Wisconsin Governor Scott McCallum declared a state of emergency. Milwaukee's American Signal Corporation donated a T-121 siren to the village. The village of Siren received a state grant of $500,000; Burnett and Washburn counties received $250,000 from the United States Department of Labor to help rebuild.

== See also ==
- List of North American tornadoes and tornado outbreaks
- 1996 Oakfield tornado outbreak
