= Meenon, Wisconsin =

- Town
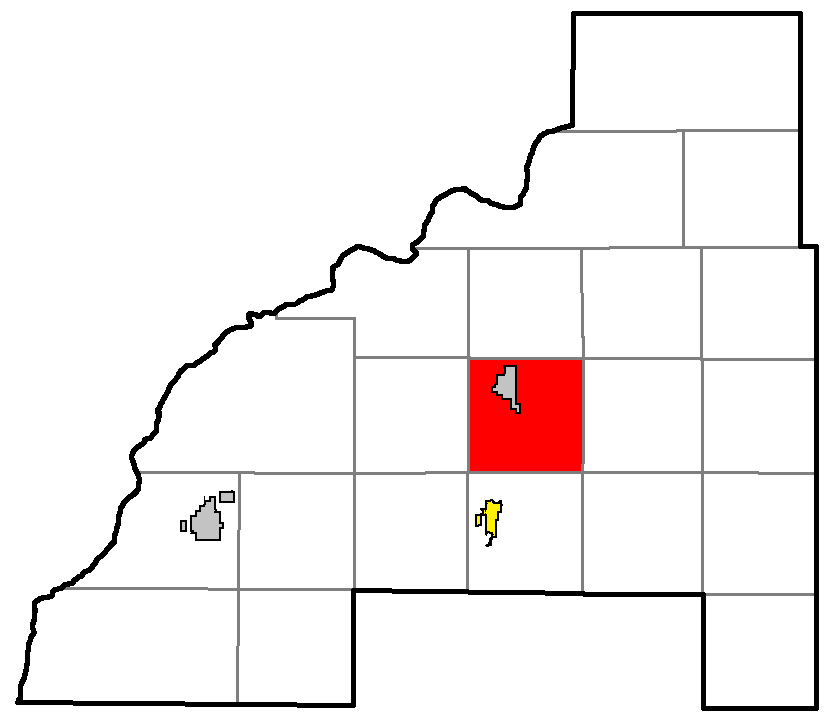
- Location of Meenon, within Burnett County
- Coordinates: 45°50′36″N 92°20′10″W
- Country: United States
- State: Wisconsin
- County: Burnett

Area
  - Total: 33.3 sq mi (86.2 km^{2})
  - Land: 31.9 sq mi (82.6 km^{2})
  - Water: 1.4 sq mi (3.6 km^{2})
- Elevation: 988 ft (301 m)

Population (2020)
  - Total: 1,212
  - Density: 38.0/sq mi (14.7/km^{2})
- Time zone: UTC-6 (Central (CST))
  - Summer (DST): UTC-5 (CDT)
- Area codes: 715 & 534
- FIPS code: 55-50650
- GNIS feature ID: 1583687
- Website: https://townofmeenon.com/

Meenon is a town in Burnett County in the U.S. state of Wisconsin. The population was 1,212 at the 2020 census. It is the home of the Burnett County Government Center.

== Geography ==
Meenon is located near the center of Burnett County. The town surrounds the village of Webster but is separate from it.

According to the United States Census Bureau, the Town of Meenon has a total area of 33.3 square miles (86.2 km^{2}), of which 31.9 square miles (82.6 km^{2}) is land and 1.4 square miles (3.6 km^{2}), or 4.12%, is water. Meenon is along Wisconsin Highway 35.

Wisconsin Highway 70 also passes through the south-central and southeast part of Meenon near Siren.

== Demographics ==
As of the census of 2000, there were 1,172 people, 483 households, and 322 families residing in the town. The population density was 36.7 people per square mile (14.2/km^{2}). There were 836 housing units at an average density of 26.2 per square mile (10.1/km^{2}). The racial makeup of the town was 91.98% White, 1.19% African American, 4.86% Native American, 0.34% Asian, 0.34% from other races, and 1.28% from two or more races. Hispanic or Latino of any race were 1.11% of the population.

There were 483 households, out of which 25.7% had children under the age of 18 living with them, 54.0% were married couples living together, 6.4% had a female householder with no husband present, and 33.3% were non-families. 27.3% of all households were made up of individuals, and 9.3% had someone living alone who was 65 years of age or older. The average household size was 2.31 and the average family size was 2.81.

Historical Population
Census	Pop.	Note	%±
1900	1,174		—
1910	783		−33.3%
1920	483		−38.3%
1930	500		3.5%
1940	608		21.6%
1950	526		−13.5%
1960	431		−18.1%
1970	596		38.3%
1980	838		40.6%
1990	956		14.1%
2000	1,172		22.6%
2010	1,163		−0.8%
2020	1,212		4.2%
2024 (est.)	1,245		2.7%

In the town, the population was spread out, with 21.9% under the age of 18, 6.7% from 18 to 24, 25.6% from 25 to 44, 27.5% from 45 to 64, and 18.3% who were 65 years of age or older. The median age was 42 years. For every 100 females, there were 116.6 males. For every 100 females age 18 and over, there were 116.3 males.

The median income for a household in the town was $37,011, and the median income for a family was $43,250. Males had a median income of $32,143 versus $21,625 for females. The per capita income for the town was $18,067. About 4.5% of families and 7.0% of the population were below the poverty line, including 9.5% of those under age 18 and 1.6% of those age 65 or over.
