= Webb Lake =

Webb Lake may refer to:

- Webb Lake (Antarctica), a lake in Victoria Land, Antarctica
- Webb Lake (Maine), a lake
- Webb Lake, Wisconsin, a town
  - Webb Lake (community), Wisconsin, an unincorporated community within the town
