= Riverside, Wisconsin =

Riverside, Wisconsin may refer to the following places in Wisconsin:

- Riverside, Burnett County, Wisconsin, an unincorporated community
- Riverside, Lafayette County, Wisconsin, an unincorporated community
