= Webb Lake, Wisconsin =

- Town
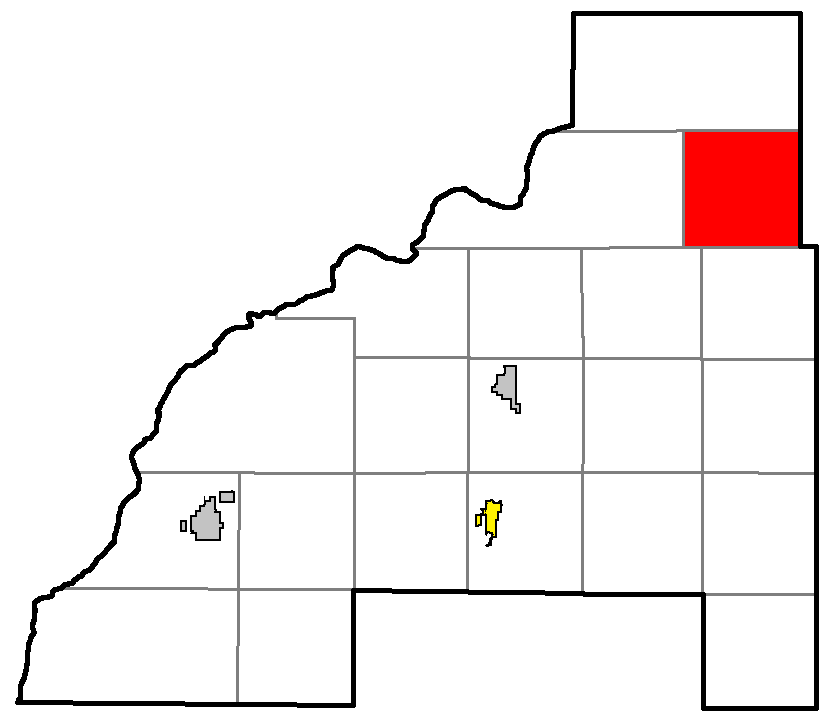
- Location of Webb Lake in Burnett County, Wisconsin
- Coordinates: 46°1′14″N 92°7′14″W
- Country: United States
- State: Wisconsin
- County: Burnett

Area
  - Total: 36.2 sq mi (93.7 km^{2})
  - Land: 32.0 sq mi (82.8 km^{2})
  - Water: 4.2 sq mi (10.8 km^{2})
- Elevation: 980 ft (300 m)

Population (2020)
  - Total: 432
  - Density: 13.5/sq mi (5.22/km^{2})
- Time zone: UTC-6 (Central (CST))
  - Summer (DST): UTC-5 (CDT)
- ZIP Code: 54830
- Area codes: 715 & 534
- FIPS code: 55-84975
- GNIS feature ID: 1584390
- Website: townofwebblake.com

Webb Lake is a town in Burnett County in the U.S. state of Wisconsin. The population was 432 at the 2020 census. It is along Wisconsin Highway 77 near County Road H. The unincorporated community of Webb Lake is located within the town of Webb Lake.

== Geography ==
According to the United States Census Bureau, the town has a total area of 36.2 square miles (93.7 km^{2}), of which 32.0 square miles (82.8 km^{2}) is land and 4.2 square miles (10.8 km^{2}), or 11.58%, is water.

The town of Webb Lake is located in northeastern Burnett County and is bordered by Washburn County to the east. The water body of Webb Lake is located slightly northwest of the center of town, and the Namekagon River, a tributary of the St. Croix River, crosses the northeast corner of the town.

Nearby places include Danbury, Swiss, Blaine, Dairyland, and Minong.

Webb Lake is 29 miles northeast of Siren, and 24 miles northwest of Spooner.

== Demographics ==
As of the census of 2000, there were 381 people, 186 households, and 114 families residing in the town. The population density was 11.9 people per square mile (4.6/km^{2}). There were 730 housing units at an average density of 22.8 per square mile (8.8/km^{2}). The racial makeup of the town was 97.38% White, 0.52% African American, 1.05% Native American, and 1.05% from two or more races. Hispanic or Latino of any race were 1.05% of the population.

There were 186 households, out of which 12.9% had children under the age of 18 living with them, 53.8% were married couples living together, 4.8% had a female householder with no husband present, and 38.2% were non-families. 34.9% of all households were made up of individuals, and 11.8% had someone living alone who was 65 years of age or older. The average household size was 1.94 and the average family size was 2.42.

In the town, the population was spread out, with 16.5% under the age of 18, 3.1% from 18 to 24, 18.4% from 25 to 44, 32.5% from 45 to 64, and 29.4% who were 65 years of age or older. The median age was 55 years. For every 100 females, there were 129.5 males. For every 100 females age 18 and over, there were 112.0 males.

The median income for a household in the town was $31,033, and the median income for a family was $36,000. Males had a median income of $20,357 versus $24,167 for females. The per capita income for the town was $17,584. None of the families and 5.0% of the population were living below the poverty line, including no under eighteens and 4.0% of those over 64.
