= Oakland, Wisconsin =

Oakland is the name of some places in the U.S. state of Wisconsin:

- Oakland, Burnett County, Wisconsin, a town
  - Oakland (community), Burnett County, Wisconsin, an unincorporated community
- Oakland, Douglas County, Wisconsin, a town
- Oakland, Jefferson County, Wisconsin, a town
  - Oakland (community), Jefferson County, Wisconsin, an unincorporated community
