= Sand Lake, Burnett County, Wisconsin =

Sand Lake, Wisconsin
- Town
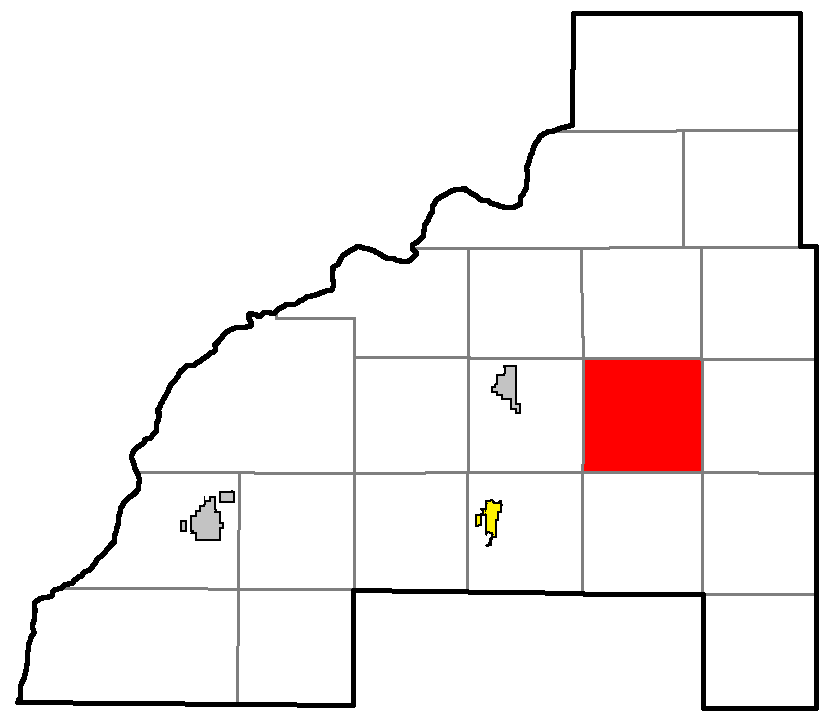
- Location of Sand Lake, within Burnett County
- Coordinates: 45°50′50″N 92°13′37″W
- Country: United States
- State: Wisconsin
- County: Burnett

Area
  - Total: 36.2 sq mi (93.7 km^{2})
  - Land: 32.8 sq mi (84.9 km^{2})
  - Water: 3.4 sq mi (8.8 km^{2})
- Elevation: 971 ft (296 m)

Population (2020)
  - Total: 576
  - Density: 17.6/sq mi (6.78/km^{2})
- Time zone: UTC-6 (Central (CST))
  - Summer (DST): UTC-5 (CDT)
- Area codes: 715 & 534
- FIPS code: 55-71450
- GNIS feature ID: 1584098
- Website: townofsandlake.org

Sand Lake is a town in Burnett County in the U.S. state of Wisconsin. The population was 576 at the 2020 census.

== Geography ==
Sand Lake is located east of the center of Burnett County. The town's largest water body, Big Sand Lake, is located along the southern border. According to the United States Census Bureau, the town has a total area of 36.2 square miles (93.7 km^{2}), of which 32.8 square miles (84.9 km^{2}) is land and 3.4 square miles (8.8 km^{2}), or 9.42%, is water.

Much of the area consists of publicly owned forests.

== Demographics ==
As of the census of 2000, there were 556 people, 212 households, and 157 families residing in the town. The population density was 17.0 people per square mile (6.6/km^{2}). There were 445 housing units at an average density of 13.6 per square mile (5.2/km^{2}). The racial makeup of the town was 75.00% White, 22.48% Native American, 0.18% Pacific Islander, 0.18% from other races, and 2.16% from two or more races. Hispanic or Latino of any race were 1.62% of the population.

There were 212 households, out of which 33.0% had children under the age of 18 living with them, 56.6% were married couples living together, 11.3% had a female householder with no husband present, and 25.5% were non-families. 19.8% of all households were made up of individuals, and 9.9% had someone living alone who was 65 years of age or older. The average household size was 2.62 and the average family size was 2.99.

In the town, the population was spread out, with 26.6% under the age of 18, 6.7% from 18 to 24, 22.5% from 25 to 44, 26.1% from 45 to 64, and 18.2% who were 65 years of age or older. The median age was 40 years. For every 100 females, there were 94.4 males. For every 100 females age 18 and over, there were 97.1 males.

The median income for a household in the town was $39,583, and the median income for a family was $42,188. Males had a median income of $35,000 versus $23,500 for females. The per capita income for the town was $16,575. About 10.3% of families and 13.2% of the population were below the poverty line, including 18.4% of those under age 18 and 12.6% of those age 65 or over.
