= Oakland, Burnett County, Wisconsin =

Oakland, Wisconsin
- Town
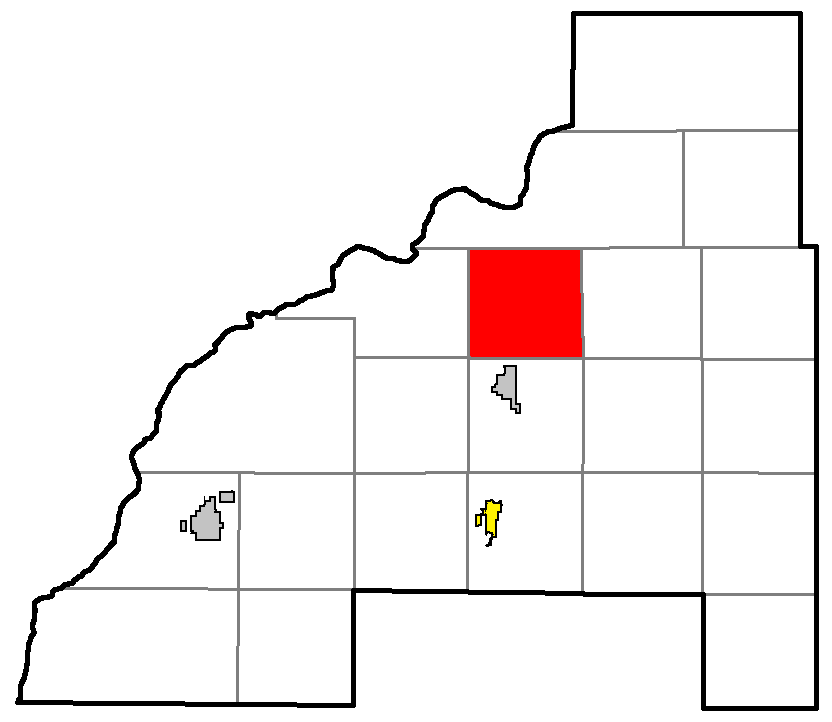
- Location of Oakland, within Burnett County
- Coordinates: 45°56′28″N 92°20′49″W
- Country: United States
- State: Wisconsin
- County: Burnett

Area
  - Total: 32.9 sq mi (85.2 km^{2})
  - Land: 26.0 sq mi (67.4 km^{2})
  - Water: 6.9 sq mi (17.8 km^{2})
- Elevation: 965 ft (294 m)

Population (2020)
  - Total: 980
  - Density: 38/sq mi (15/km^{2})
- Time zone: UTC-6 (Central (CST))
  - Summer (DST): UTC-5 (CDT)
- Area codes: 715 & 534
- FIPS code: 55-59075
- GNIS feature ID: 1583843
- Website: townofoaklandwi.com

Oakland is a town in Burnett County in the U.S. state of Wisconsin. The population was 980 at the 2020 census. It is along Wisconsin Highway 35. The unincorporated communities of Oakland and Yellow Lake are located in the town.

== Geography ==
The town is located north of the center of Burnett County. According to the United States Census, the town has a total area of 32.9 square miles (85.2 km^{2}), of which 26.0 square miles (67.4 km^{2}) is land and 6.9 square miles (17.8 km^{2}), or 20.90%, is water. The town is home to 21 named lakes, the largest of which is Yellow Lake, and several more unnamed ones.

== Demographics ==
As of the census of 2000, there were 778 people, 378 households, and 233 families residing in the town. The population density was 29.9 people per square mile (11.6/km^{2}). There were 1,045 housing units at an average density of 40.2 per square mile (15.5/km^{2}). The racial makeup of the town was 96.27% White, 3.08% Native American, 0.13% Asian, and 0.51% from two or more races. Hispanic or Latino of any race were 0.51% of the population.

There were 378 households, out of which 15.1% had children under the age of 18 living with them, 56.1% were married couples living together, 2.9% had a female householder with no husband present, and 38.1% were non-families. 32.8% of all households were made up of individuals, and 11.6% had someone living alone who was 65 years of age or older. The average household size was 2.06 and the average family size was 2.58.

In the town, the population was spread out, with 15.4% under the age of 18, 3.2% from 18 to 24, 21.3% from 25 to 44, 36.4% from 45 to 64, and 23.7% who were 65 years of age or older. The median age was 50 years. For every 100 females, there were 109.1 males. For every 100 females age 18 and over, there were 108.2 males.

The median income for a household in the town was $35,859, and the median income for a family was $40,132. Males had a median income of $32,308 versus $30,208 for females. The per capita income for the town was $19,773. About 3.6% of families and 5.4% of the population were below the poverty line, including 4.3% of those under age 18 and 2.1% of those age 65 or over.
