= Union, Burnett County, Wisconsin =

Union, Wisconsin
- Town
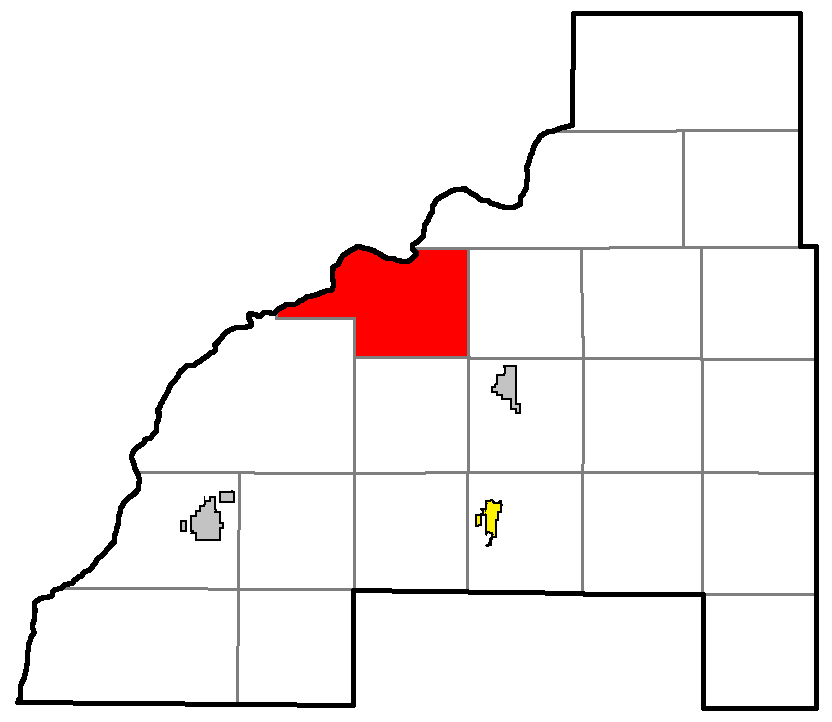
- Location of Union, within Burnett County
- Coordinates: 45°56′1″N 92°28′27″W
- Country: United States
- State: Wisconsin
- County: Burnett

Area
  - Total: 37.8 sq mi (98.0 km^{2})
  - Land: 34.8 sq mi (90.1 km^{2})
  - Water: 3.1 sq mi (7.9 km^{2})
- Elevation: 1,053 ft (321 m)

Population (2020)
  - Total: 345
  - Density: 9.92/sq mi (3.83/km^{2})
- Time zone: UTC-6 (Central (CST))
  - Summer (DST): UTC-5 (CDT)
- Area codes: 715 & 534
- FIPS code: 55-81500
- GNIS feature ID: 1584309
- Website: https://townofunionbc.com/

Union is a town in Burnett County in the U.S. state of Wisconsin. The population was 345 at the 2020 census.

== Geography ==
Union is located northwest of the center of Burnett County, with its northwestern border following the St. Croix River, the state line between Wisconsin and Minnesota. The Clam River flows into the St. Croix in Union, entering the town from the south.

According to the United States Census Bureau, the town has a total area of 37.8 square miles (98.0 km^{2}), of which 34.8 square miles (90.1 km^{2}) is land and 3.1 square miles (7.9 km^{2}), or 8.06%, is water.

== Demographics ==
As of the census of 2000, there were 351 people, 171 households, and 115 families residing in the town. The population density was 10.2 people per square mile (3.9/km^{2}). There were 422 housing units at an average density of 12.2 per square mile (4.7/km^{2}). The racial makeup of the town was 98.01% White, 1.42% Native American, and 0.57% from two or more races. Hispanic or Latino of any race were 0.28% of the population.

There were 171 households, out of which 12.9% had children under the age of 18 living with them, 61.4% were married couples living together, 3.5% had a female householder with no husband present, and 32.7% were non-families. 25.7% of all households were made up of individuals, and 10.5% had someone living alone who was 65 years of age or older. The average household size was 2.05 and the average family size was 2.43.

In the town, the population was spread out, with 12.0% under the age of 18, 2.6% from 18 to 24, 18.8% from 25 to 44, 41.3% from 45 to 64, and 25.4% who were 65 years of age or older. The median age was 56 years. For every 100 females, there were 102.9 males. For every 100 females age 18 and over, there were 104.6 males.

The median income for a household in the town was $31,250, and the median income for a family was $33,906. Males had a median income of $30,625 versus $21,875 for females. The per capita income for the town was $18,404. About 3.3% of families and 8.0% of the population were below the poverty line, including none of those under age 18 and 5.6% of those age 65 or over.
