= Burnett County Government Center =

Coordinates: 45°49′21″N 92°21′59″W

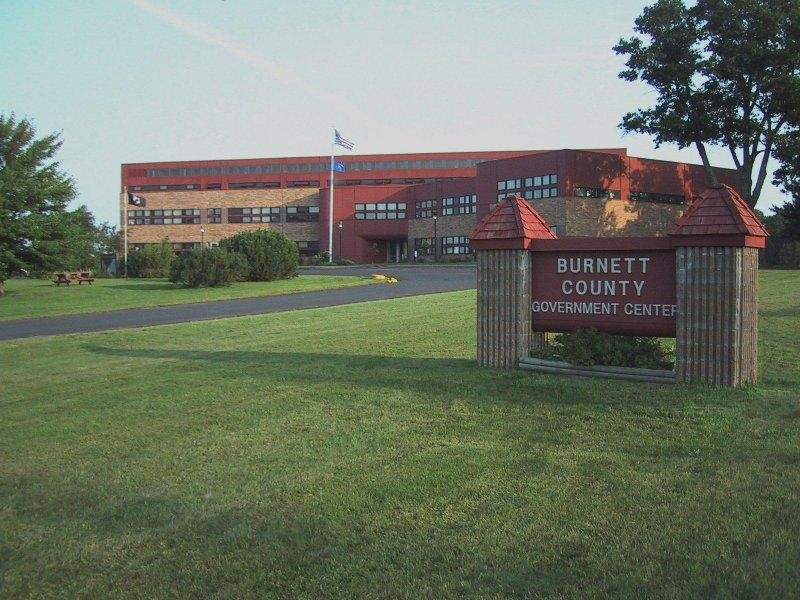
Burnett County Government Center, circa 2004

The Burnett County Government Center houses the majority of local county governmental services for Burnett County, Wisconsin. It is located in Siren.

The Burnett County Government Center is in the modern office building style and was designed in 1983 by Ozolins & D'Jock Architects, Ltd. of Eau Claire, Wisconsin. Major construction was by Construction Analysis & Management of Minneapolis and the project completed in fall 1984. The formal building dedication took place on Saturday, April 27, 1985. Construction costs were within the original budgeted 3.6 million dollars.

There are approximately 54,000 square feet (5,000 m^{2}) of building space on this multi-acre grounds area. The facility houses the Courts System, Sheriff's Department, Jail, and all other County Agencies except for the Airport, Highway, and Forestry Departments.

A major exterior masonry renovation took place in 2003. The design was by Ayres Associates, an architectural/engineering company based in Eau Claire, Wisconsin, with construction by Huotari Construction of Medford, Wisconsin.
