= Scott, Burnett County, Wisconsin =

Scott, Wisconsin
- Town
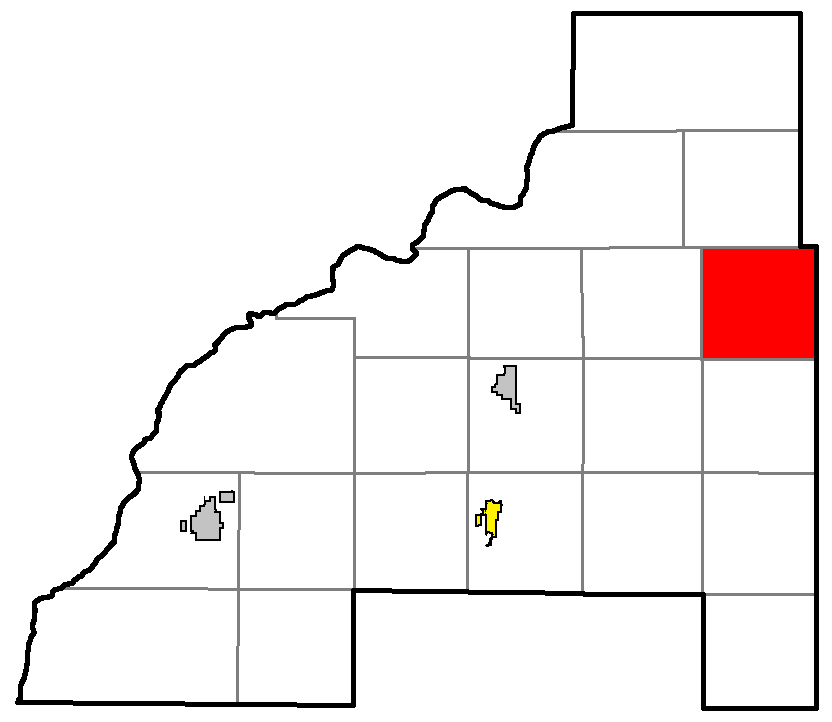
- Location of Scott, within Burnett County
- Coordinates: 45°56′12″N 92°6′35″W
- Country: United States
- State: Wisconsin
- County: Burnett

Area
  - Total: 34.2 sq mi (88.5 km^{2})
  - Land: 27.7 sq mi (71.7 km^{2})
  - Water: 6.5 sq mi (16.8 km^{2})
- Elevation: 1,030 ft (314 m)

Population (2020)
  - Total: 583
  - Density: 21.1/sq mi (8.13/km^{2})
- Time zone: UTC-6 (Central (CST))
  - Summer (DST): UTC-5 (CDT)
- Area codes: 715 & 534
- FIPS code: 55-72225
- GNIS feature ID: 1584114
- Website: townofscottwi.org

Scott is a town in Burnett County in the U.S. state of Wisconsin. The population was 583 at the 2020 census, up from 494 at the 2010 census.

== Geography ==
Scott is located in eastern Burnett County, with Washburn County along the town's eastern border. According to the United States Census Bureau, the town has a total area of 34.2 square miles (88.5 km^{2}), of which 27.7 square miles (71.7 km^{2}) is land and 6.5 square miles (16.8 km^{2}), or 18.97%, is water. There are 25 named lakes either wholly or partially in the town, the largest of which is McKenzie Lake in the southeast part of the town.

== Demographics ==
As of the census of 2000, there were 590 people, 282 households, and 203 families residing in the town. The population density was 21.3 people per square mile (8.2/km^{2}). There were 916 housing units at an average density of 33.0 per square mile (12.8/km^{2}). The racial makeup of the town was 98.31% White, 0.85% African American, 0.51% Native American, 0.17% Pacific Islander, and 0.17% from two or more races.

There were 282 households, out of which 11.7% had children under the age of 18 living with them, 64.9% were married couples living together, 5.3% had a female householder with no husband present, and 27.7% were non-families. 23.4% of all households were made up of individuals, and 10.6% had someone living alone who was 65 years of age or older. The average household size was 2.09 and the average family size was 2.40.

In the town, the population was spread out, with 12.2% under the age of 18, 2.7% from 18 to 24, 14.2% from 25 to 44, 38.3% from 45 to 64, and 32.5% who were 65 years of age or older. The median age was 59 years. For every 100 females, there were 97.3 males. For every 100 females age 18 and over, there were 100.0 males.

The median income for a household in the town was $33,854, and the median income for a family was $40,903. Males had a median income of $29,688 versus $23,333 for females. The per capita income for the town was $18,716. About 3.2% of families and 6.9% of the population were below the poverty line, including none of those under age 18 and 7.3% of those age 65 or over.
