= Burnett County, Wisconsin =

County in Wisconsin, United States

- County
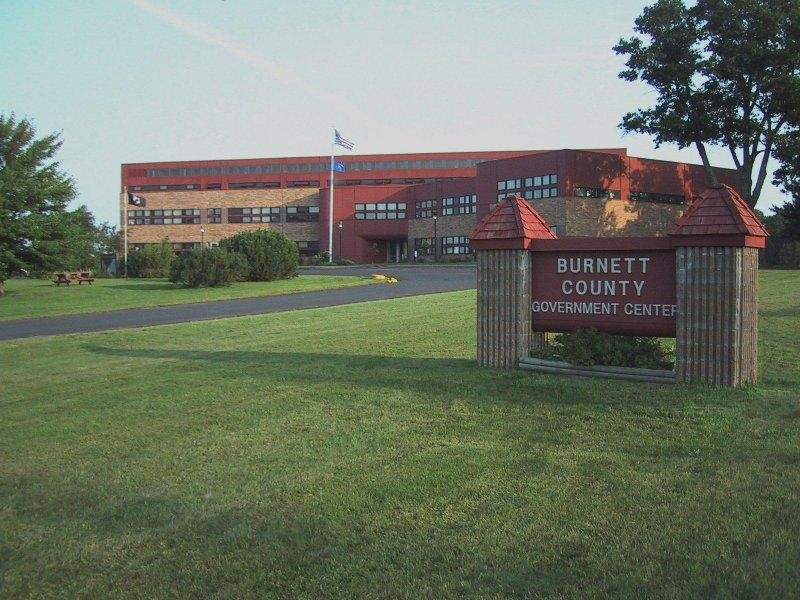
- Burnett County Government Center

- Location within the U.S. state of Wisconsin
- Coordinates: 45°52′N 92°22′W
- Country: United States
- State: Wisconsin
- Founded: 1865
- Named for: Thomas P. Burnett
- Seat: Siren
- Largest village: Grantsburg

Area
  - Total: 880 sq mi (2,300 km^{2})
  - Land: 822 sq mi (2,130 km^{2})
  - Water: 58 sq mi (150 km^{2}) 6.6%

Population (2020)
  - Total: 16,526
  - Estimate (2025): 17,223 ▲
  - Density: 20.1/sq mi (7.76/km^{2})
- Time zone: UTC−6 (Central)
  - Summer (DST): UTC−5 (CDT)
- Congressional district: 7th
- Website: www.burnettcountywi.gov

Burnett County is a county located in the U.S. state of Wisconsin. As of the 2020 census, the population was 16,526. Its county seat is Siren, with the majority of county governmental services located at the Burnett County Government Center. The county was created in 1856 and organized in 1865. The St. Croix Chippewa Indians of Wisconsin have reservation lands in Burnett County and are the county's largest employer. The county is considered a high-recreation retirement destination by the U.S. Department of Agriculture.

== Geography ==
Soils of Burnett County

According to the U.S. Census Bureau, the county has a total area of 880 square miles (2,300 km^{2}), of which 872 square miles (2,260 km^{2}) is land and 58 square miles (150 km^{2}) (6.6%) is water. Saginaw Lake is located in the county, south of the Namekagon River.

=== Adjacent counties ===
- Douglas County – northeast
- Washburn County – east
- Barron County – southeast
- Polk County – south
- Chisago County, Minnesota – southwest
- Pine County, Minnesota – west

=== Major highways ===
- Highway 35 (Wisconsin)
- Highway 48 (Wisconsin)
- Highway 70 (Wisconsin)
- Highway 77 (Wisconsin)
- Highway 87 (Wisconsin)

=== Airports ===
- Burnett County Airport (KRZN) serves the county and surrounding communities.
- Grantsburg Municipal Airport (KGTG) enhances county service.

=== National protected area ===
- Saint Croix National Scenic Riverway (part)

== Demographics ==
Historical population
Census	Pop.	Note	%±
1860	12		—
1870	706		5,783.3%
1880	3,140		344.8%
1890	4,393		39.9%
1900	7,478		70.2%
1910	9,026		20.7%
1920	10,735		18.9%
1930	10,233		−4.7%
1940	11,382		11.2%
1950	10,236		−10.1%
1960	9,214		−10.0%
1970	9,276		0.7%
1980	12,340		33.0%
1990	13,084		6.0%
2000	15,674		19.8%
2010	15,457		−1.4%
2020	16,526		6.9%
2025 (est.)	17,223	▲	4.2%
U.S. Decennial Census; 1790–1960 1900–1990; 1990–2000 2010 2020

=== Racial and ethnic composition ===
Burnett County, Wisconsin – Racial and ethnic composition Note: the US Census treats Hispanic/Latino as an ethnic category. This table excludes Latinos from the racial categories and assigns them to a separate category. Hispanics/Latinos may be of any race.
Race / ethnicity (NH = Non-Hispanic)	Pop 1980	Pop 1990	Pop 2000	Pop 2010	Pop 2020	% 1980	% 1990	% 2000	% 2010	% 2020
White alone (NH)	11,866	12,462	14,563	14,067	14,658	96.16%	95.25%	92.91%	91.01%	88.70%
Black or African American alone (NH)	11	22	54	81	65	0.09%	0.17%	0.34%	0.52%	0.39%
Native American or Alaska Native alone (NH)	399	531	675	704	697	3.23%	4.06%	4.31%	4.55%	4.22%
Asian alone (NH)	15	24	37	52	53	0.12%	0.18%	0.24%	0.34%	0.32%
Native Hawaiian or Pacific Islander alone (NH)	x	x	9	3	10	x	x	0.06%	0.02%	0.06%
Other race alone (NH)	25	2	2	6	32	0.20%	0.02%	0.01%	0.04%	0.19%
Mixed race or Multiracial (NH)	x	x	214	350	757	x	x	1.37%	2.26%	4.58%
Hispanic or Latino (any race)	24	43	120	194	254	0.19%	0.33%	0.77%	1.26%	1.54%
Total	12,340	13,084	15,674	15,457	16,526	100.00%	100.00%	100.00%	100.00%	100.00%

=== 2020 census ===
As of the 2020 census, the county had a population of 16,526. The population density was 20.1 people per square mile (7.8 people/km^{2}). There were 15,201 housing units at an average density of 18.5 units per square mile (7.1 units/km^{2}).

The median age was 54.4 years. 17.5% of residents were under the age of 18 and 29.7% of residents were 65 years of age or older. For every 100 females there were 104.2 males, and for every 100 females age 18 and over there were 103.2 males age 18 and over.

The racial makeup of the county was 89.3% White, 0.4% Black or African American, 4.4% American Indian and Alaska Native, 0.3% Asian, 0.1% Native Hawaiian and Pacific Islander, 0.5% from some other race, and 5.1% from two or more races. Hispanic or Latino residents of any race comprised 1.5% of the population.

<0.1% of residents lived in urban areas, while 100.0% lived in rural areas.

There were 7,499 households in the county, of which 19.7% had children under the age of 18 living in them. Of all households, 49.9% were married-couple households, 22.1% were households with a male householder and no spouse or partner present, and 20.6% were households with a female householder and no spouse or partner present. About 31.2% of all households were made up of individuals and 15.9% had someone living alone who was 65 years of age or older.

Of those housing units, 50.7% were vacant. Among occupied housing units, 82.6% were owner-occupied and 17.4% were renter-occupied. The homeowner vacancy rate was 1.5% and the rental vacancy rate was 6.2%.

=== 2000 census ===
2000 Census Age Pyramid for Burnett County

As of the census of 2000, there were 15,674 people, 6,613 households, and 4,503 families residing in the county. The population density was 19 people per square mile (7.3 people/km^{2}). There were 12,582 housing units at an average density of 15 units per square mile (5.8 units/km^{2}). The racial makeup of the county was 93.25% White, 0.36% Black or African American, 4.45% Native American, 0.24% Asian, 0.07% Pacific Islander, 0.21% from other races, and 1.42% from two or more races. 0.77% of the population were Hispanic or Latino of any race. 28.9% were of German, 15.4% Swedish, 12.8% Norwegian and 6.3% Irish ancestry.

There were 6,613 households, out of which 25.10% had children under the age of 18 living with them, 56.20% were married couples living together, 7.50% had a female householder with no husband present, and 31.90% were non-families. 26.90% of all households were made up of individuals, and 12.20% had someone living alone who was 65 years of age or older. The average household size was 2.33 and the average family size was 2.80.

In the county, the population was spread out, with 22.10% under the age of 18, 6.00% from 18 to 24, 23.20% from 25 to 44, 28.40% from 45 to 64, and 20.30% who were 65 years of age or older. The median age was 44 years. For every 100 females there were 101.50 males. For every 100 females age 18 and over, there were 100.30 males.

In 2017, there were 118 births, giving a general fertility rate of 58.5 births per 1000 women aged 15–44, the 23rd lowest rate out of all 72 Wisconsin counties. Additionally, there were no reported induced abortions performed on women of Burnett County residence in 2017.

== Communities ==
Burnett County is one of only three Wisconsin counties that have no incorporated cities. It is the only Wisconsin county to have villages but no cities.

=== Villages ===
- Grantsburg
- Siren (seat)
- Webster

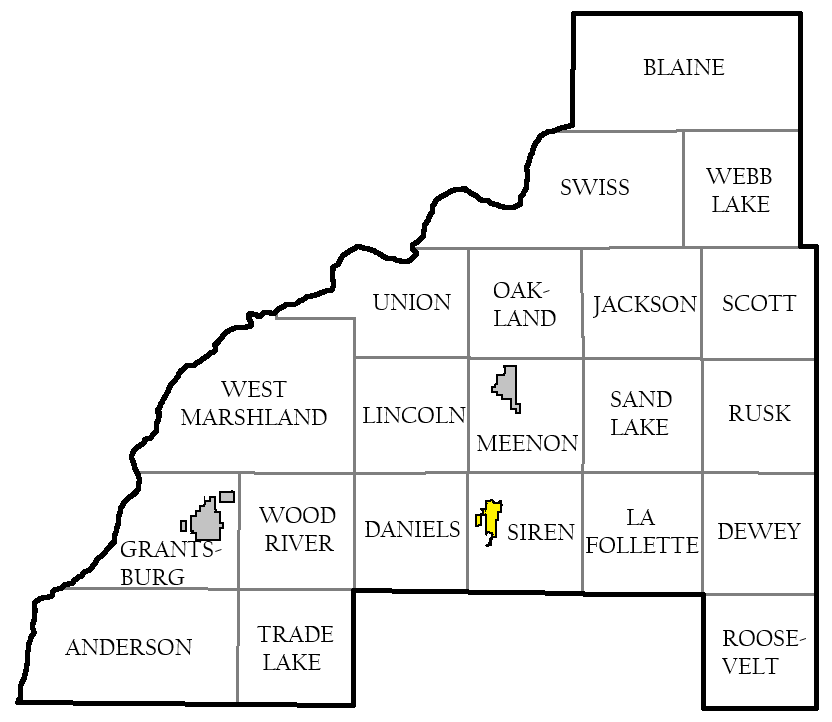
Towns of Burnett County

=== Towns ===
- Anderson
- Blaine
- Daniels
- Dewey
- Grantsburg
- Jackson
- La Follette
- Lincoln
- Meenon
- Oakland
- Roosevelt
- Rusk
- Sand Lake
- Scott
- Siren
- Swiss
- Trade Lake
- Union
- Webb Lake
- West Marshland
- Wood River

=== Census-designated place ===
- Danbury

=== Unincorporated communities ===
- Alpha
- Bashaw
- Benson
- Branstad
- Coomer
- Falun
- Four Corners
- Gaslyn
- Hertel
- Lind
- Oakland
- Pole Cat Crossing (partial)
- Randall
- Riverside
- Timberland
- Trade Lake
- Trade River
- Webb Lake
- Woodland Corner

== Politics ==
United States presidential election results for Burnett County, Wisconsin
Year	Republican		Democratic		Third party(ies)	
Year	No.	%	No.	%	No.	%
1892	406	56.70%	55	7.68%	255	35.61%
1896	800	67.51%	349	29.45%	36	3.04%
1900	1,112	80.23%	218	15.73%	56	4.04%
1904	1,262	86.50%	82	5.62%	115	7.88%
1908	1,181	72.19%	296	18.09%	159	9.72%
1912	403	26.74%	305	20.24%	799	53.02%
1916	1,007	53.97%	638	34.19%	221	11.84%
1920	2,025	79.57%	187	7.35%	333	13.08%
1924	958	30.34%	76	2.41%	2,124	67.26%
1928	2,742	74.71%	880	23.98%	48	1.31%
1932	1,281	33.42%	2,437	63.58%	115	3.00%
1936	1,422	31.88%	2,801	62.80%	237	5.31%
1940	2,510	49.17%	2,513	49.23%	82	1.61%
1944	2,119	52.72%	1,868	46.48%	32	0.80%
1948	1,590	40.78%	2,177	55.83%	132	3.39%
1952	2,683	60.43%	1,741	39.21%	16	0.36%
1956	2,198	52.36%	1,986	47.31%	14	0.33%
1960	2,483	54.03%	2,095	45.58%	18	0.39%
1964	1,536	34.42%	2,921	65.45%	6	0.13%
1968	2,056	45.81%	2,010	44.79%	422	9.40%
1972	2,972	54.37%	2,389	43.71%	105	1.92%
1976	2,573	39.93%	3,720	57.74%	150	2.33%
1980	3,027	44.81%	3,200	47.37%	528	7.82%
1984	3,528	51.01%	3,331	48.16%	57	0.82%
1988	2,884	44.61%	3,537	54.71%	44	0.68%
1992	2,340	31.47%	3,172	42.66%	1,924	25.87%
1996	2,452	34.20%	3,625	50.56%	1,092	15.23%
2000	3,967	48.67%	3,626	44.49%	558	6.85%
2004	4,743	50.89%	4,499	48.27%	79	0.85%
2008	4,200	48.34%	4,337	49.92%	151	1.74%
2012	4,550	52.44%	3,986	45.94%	141	1.62%
2016	5,410	61.91%	2,949	33.75%	379	4.34%
2020	6,462	63.72%	3,569	35.19%	110	1.08%
2024	7,008	64.83%	3,665	33.90%	137	1.27%

During the 1930s and 1940s at the state level Burnett county was a stronghold for the Wisconsin Progressive Party - National Progressives. voting consistently for Philip La Follette during gubernatorial elections and Robert M. La Follette Jr. for senate.

== See also ==
- Burnett County Airport
- National Register of Historic Places listings in Burnett County, Wisconsin
- USS Burnett County (LST-512)
