= Burnett County Airport =

Airport in Siren, Wisconsin, United States

- IATA: none; ICAO: KRZN; FAA LID: RZN

Summary
- Airport type: Public
- Owner: Burnett County
- Serves: Siren, Wisconsin
- Built: March 1947; 79 years ago
- Time zone: CST (UTC−06:00)
  - Summer (DST): CDT (UTC−05:00)
- Elevation AMSL: 989 ft (301 m)
- Coordinates: 45°49′24″N 092°22′25″W

Map
- Location of airport in Wisconsin KRZN/RZN (the United States)

Runways
Direction	Length		Surface
Direction	ft	m	Surface
14/32	5,000	1,524	Asphalt
5/23	3,900	1,189	Asphalt

Statistics
- Aircraft operations (2022): 14,700
- Based aircraft (2024): 23
- Source: Federal Aviation Administration

Burnett County Airport (ICAO: KRZN, FAA LID: RZN) is a county-owned public use airport located three nautical miles (6 km) north of the central business district of Siren, in Burnett County, Wisconsin, United States. It is included in the Federal Aviation Administration (FAA) National Plan of Integrated Airport Systems for 2025–2029, in which it is categorized as a local general aviation facility.

Burnett County is in northwestern Wisconsin, on the border with Minnesota; Burnett County Airport is about 95 mi (153 km) northeast of Minneapolis, Minnesota by car. The rural area is known for its abundant lakes and associated recreational opportunities, as well as for its wintertime snowmobile trails.

Although many U.S. airports use the same three-letter location identifier for the FAA and IATA, Burnett County Airport is assigned RZN by the FAA but has no designation from the IATA (which assigned RZN to Turlatovo Airport in Ryazan, Russia).

== Facilities and aircraft ==
Burnett County Airport covers an area of 576 acres (233 ha) at an elevation of 989 feet (301 m) above mean sea level. It has two asphalt paved runways: the primary runway 14/32 was reconstructed and extended to 5,000 by 75 feet (1,524 x 23 m) during the summer and fall of 2009 and the crosswind runway 5/23 is 3,900 by 75 feet (1,189 x 23 m).

For the 12-month period ending August 4, 2022, the airport had 14,700 aircraft operations, an average of 40 per day: 99% general aviation and 1% air taxi. In July 2024, there were 23 aircraft based at this airport: 22 single-engine and 1 multi-engine.

== See also ==
- List of airports in Wisconsin
