= Grantsburg (town), Wisconsin =

Town in Burnett County, Wisconsin

Grantsburg
- Town
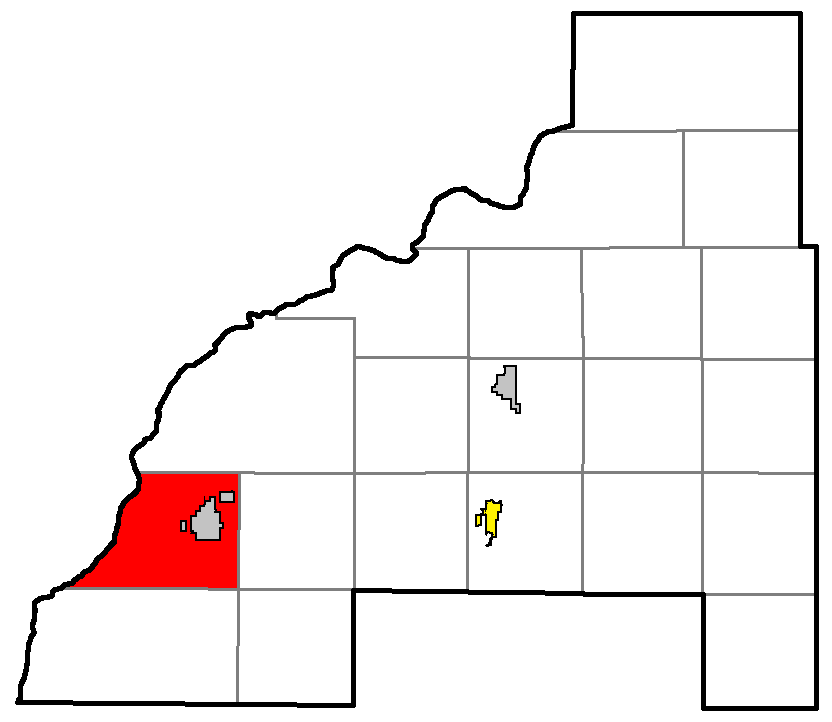
- Location of Grantsburg, within Burnett County
- Coordinates: 45°46′49″N 92°44′02″W
- Country: United States
- State: Wisconsin
- County: Burnett

Area
  - Total: 36.4 sq mi (94 km^{2})
  - Land: 35.6 sq mi (92 km^{2})
  - Water: 0.8 sq mi (2.1 km^{2}) 2.20%
- Elevation: 955 ft (291 m)

Population (2020)
  - Total: 1,174
  - Density: 33.0/sq mi (12.7/km^{2})
- Time zone: UTC−6 (CST)
  - Summer (DST): UTC−5 (CDT)
- Website: www.tn.grantsburg.wi.gov

Grantsburg is a town in Burnett County, Wisconsin, United States. The population was 1,174 at the 2020 census. The village of Grantsburg is located within the town. The unincorporated communities of Branstad and Lind are located in the town.

== Geography ==
Grantsburg is located in southwestern Burnett County, with the St. Croix River forming the western border of the town, county, and state of Wisconsin. Pine County, Minnesota, is across the river. The village of Grantsburg is a separate municipality that is surrounded by the town of Grantsburg and is located east of the geographic center of the town.

According to the United States Census Bureau, the town has a total area of 36.4 square miles (94.3 km^{2}), of which 35.6 square miles (92.2 km^{2}) is land and 0.81 square miles (2.1 km^{2}), or 2.20%, is water.

== Demographics ==
As of the census of 2000, there were 967 people, 370 households, and 274 families residing in the town. The population density was 27.1 people per square mile (10.5/km^{2}). There were 445 housing units at an average density of 12.5 per square mile (4.8/km^{2}). The racial makeup of the town was 97.93% White, 0.10% Black or African American, 0.72% Native American, 0.10% Asian, 0.21% Pacific Islander, 0.10% from other races, and 0.83% from two or more races. 0.93% of the population were Hispanic or Latino of any race.

There were 370 households, out of which 34.3% had children under the age of 18 living with them, 63.2% were married couples living together, 6.2% had a female householder with no husband present, and 25.7% were non-families. 19.5% of all households were made up of individuals, and 6.5% had someone living alone who was 65 years of age or older. The average household size was 2.61 and the average family size was 2.99.

In the town, the population was spread out, with 27.7% under the age of 18, 6.7% from 18 to 24, 28.4% from 25 to 44, 28.0% from 45 to 64, and 9.1% who were 65 years of age or older. The median age was 38 years. For every 100 females, there were 101.5 males. For every 100 females age 18 and over, there were 102.0 males.

The median income for a household in the town was $43,264, and the median income for a family was $46,806. Males had a median income of $34,313 versus $20,139 for females. The per capita income for the town was $18,000. About 3.4% of families and 6.7% of the population were below the poverty line, including 6.4% of those under age 18 and 13.2% of those age 65 or over.

== Notable people ==
- Anne Carlsen (1915–2002), educator and disability rights advocate
- Gus Johnson, comedian
