= Webster, Burnett County, Wisconsin =

Village in Wisconsin, United States

Webster
- Village
- Location of Webster in Burnett County, Wisconsin.

- Location within the state of Wisconsin
- Coordinates: 45°52′45″N 92°21′55″W
- Country: United States
- State: Wisconsin
- County: Burnett

Area
  - Total: 1.75 sq mi (4.54 km^{2})
  - Land: 1.75 sq mi (4.54 km^{2})
  - Water: 0 sq mi (0.00 km^{2})

Population (2020)
  - Total: 694
  - Density: 396/sq mi (153/km^{2})
- Time zone: UTC-6 (Central (CST))
  - Summer (DST): UTC-5 (CDT)
- ZIP codes: 54893
- Area codes: 715 & 534
- FIPS code: 55-85025
- GNIS feature ID: 1584391

Webster is a village in Burnett County in the U.S. state of Wisconsin. The population was 694 at the 2020 census. It is along Wisconsin Highway 35.

== History ==
The village was called Clam River until 1896, when a new post office was established and resident J.D. Rice petitioned U.S. Rep. John J. Jenkins to change the name to Webster, after lexicographer Noah Webster.

== Geography ==
Webster's location is at 45°52′45″N 92°21′55″W (45.879066, -92.365163).

According to the United States Census Bureau, the village has a total area of 1.76 square miles (4.56 km^{2}), all land.

The village of Webster is geographically within the town of Meenon, but is a separate entity.

Webster is located 65 miles south of Superior, 94 miles northeast of Minneapolis, and 110 miles northwest of Eau Claire.

== Demographics ==
Historical population
Census	Pop.	Note	%±
1920	399		—
1930	501		25.6%
1940	524		4.6%
1950	552		5.3%
1960	514		−6.9%
1970	502		−2.3%
1980	610		21.5%
1990	623		2.1%
2000	653		4.8%
2010	653		0.0%
2020	694		6.3%
U.S. Decennial Census

=== 2010 census ===
As of the census of 2010, there were 653 people, 308 households, and 172 families living in the village. The population density was 371.0 inhabitants per square mile (143.2/km^{2}). There were 355 housing units at an average density of 201.7 per square mile (77.9/km^{2}). The racial makeup of the village was 90.4% White, 1.8% African American, 3.8% Native American, 0.2% Asian, 0.9% from other races, and 2.9% from two or more races. Hispanic or Latino of any race were 2.0% of the population.

There were 308 households, of which 27.9% had children under the age of 18 living with them, 31.8% were married couples living together, 17.5% had a female householder with no husband present, 6.5% had a male householder with no wife present, and 44.2% were non-families. 39.9% of all households were made up of individuals, and 22.4% had someone living alone who was 65 years of age or older. The average household size was 2.12 and the average family size was 2.76.

The median age in the village was 40.3 years. 24.2% of residents were under the age of 18; 6% were between the ages of 18 and 24; 24.3% were from 25 to 44; 23.9% were from 45 to 64; and 21.6% were 65 years of age or older. The gender makeup of the village was 43.6% male and 56.4% female.

=== 2000 census ===
As of the census of 2000, there were 653 people, 302 households, and 176 families living in the village. The population density was 367.8 people per square mile (141.6/km^{2}). There were 327 housing units at an average density of 184.2/sq mi (70.9/km^{2}). The racial makeup of the village was 90.51% White, 0.46% African American, 5.05% Native American, 0.46% Asian, and 3.52% from two or more races. Hispanic or Latino of any race were 0.31% of the population.

There were 302 households, out of which 28.1% had children under the age of 18 living with them, 40.4% were married couples living together, 15.6% had a female householder with no husband present, and 41.4% were non-families. 38.1% of all households were made up of individuals, and 27.8% had someone living alone who was 65 years of age or older. The average household size was 2.16 and the average family size was 2.88.

In the village, the population was spread out, with 25.0% under the age of 18, 8.0% from 18 to 24, 22.5% from 25 to 44, 17.2% from 45 to 64, and 27.4% who were 65 years of age or older. The median age was 40 years. For every 100 females, there were 76.0 males. For every 100 females age 18 and over, there were 75.0 males.

The median income for a household in the village was $29,432, and the median income for a family was $35,288. Males had a median income of $28,214 versus $21,500 for females. The per capita income for the village was $15,411. About 5.8% of families and 9.9% of the population were below the poverty line, including 15.4% of those under age 18 and 9.4% of those age 65 or over.

== Governance ==
- Village President: Jeff Roberts
- Village Trustees:
  - Sarah Casady
  - Kelsey Gustafson
  - Timothy Maloney
  - Darrell Sears
  - Greg Widiker
  - Kevin "Charlie" Weis
- Village Clerk/Treasurer: Debra Doriott-Kuhnly
- Chief of Police: Stephenie Wedin
- Fire Chief: Alan Steiner
- Municipal Court Judge: Brian Sears
- Municipal Court Clerk: Tessa Anderson
- Public Works Director: Jay Heyer
- Assessor: Steve Nordquist

== Education ==
The Village of Webster is part of the School District of Webster. The school district includes Webster Middle–High School, serving grades 5–12, and Webster Elementary School, serving grades K–4. The district enrolled 655 students in 2017–2018. Webster School District covers about 550 square miles of land, mostly in Burnett County, with a small portion in southwest Douglas County. It is the second largest district in the State of Wisconsin, in terms of geographical area. Students come from the Village of Webster, Town of Meenon, Town of Swiss, Community of Danbury, Town of Dairyland, and several other townships, as well as land belonging to the St. Croix Chippewa Indians of Wisconsin.

== Notable people ==
- Mary Mack – comedian, musician, and actress
- Jarrod Washburn – pitcher for the Los Angeles Angels
