= Daniels, Wisconsin =

- Town
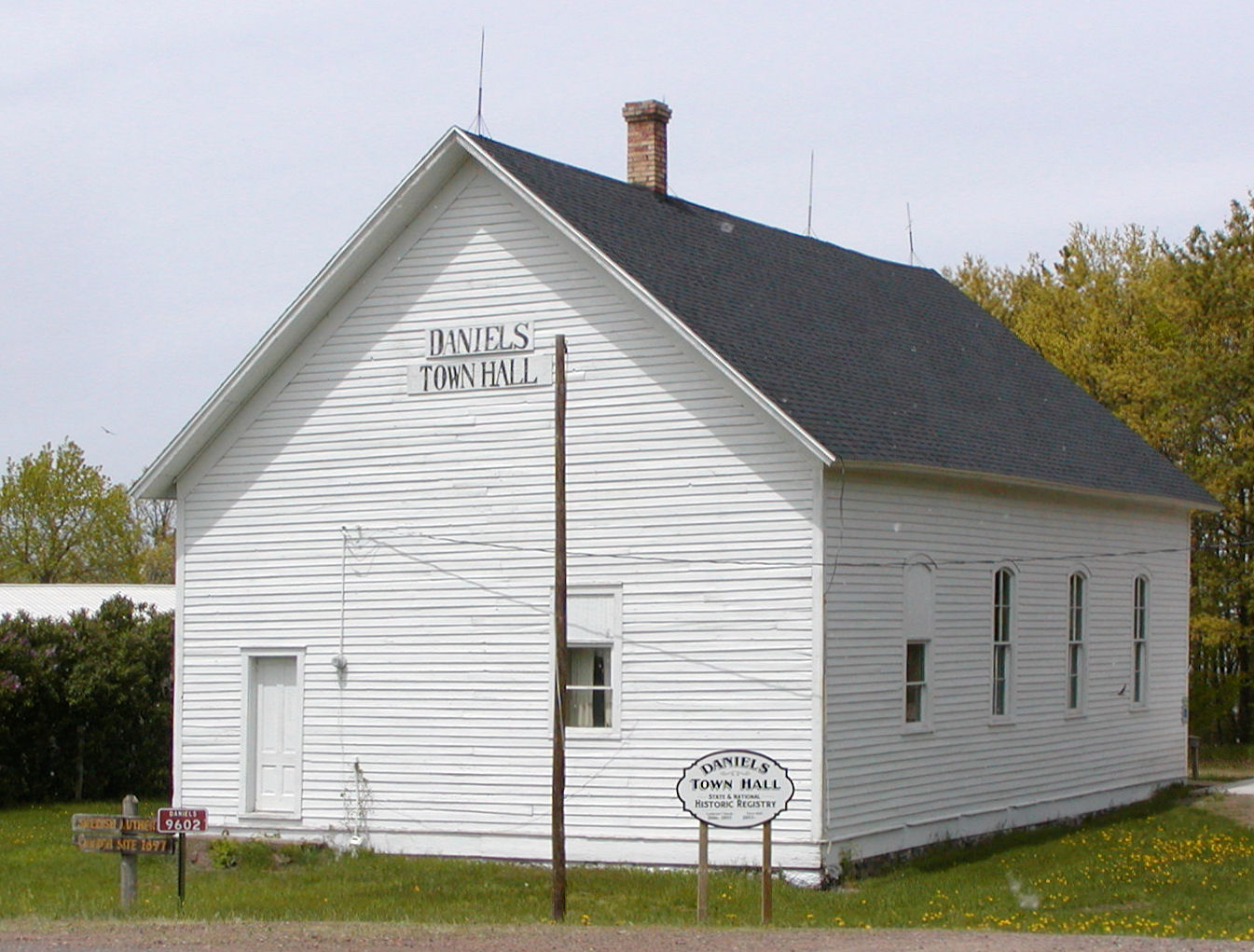
- Daniels Town Hall

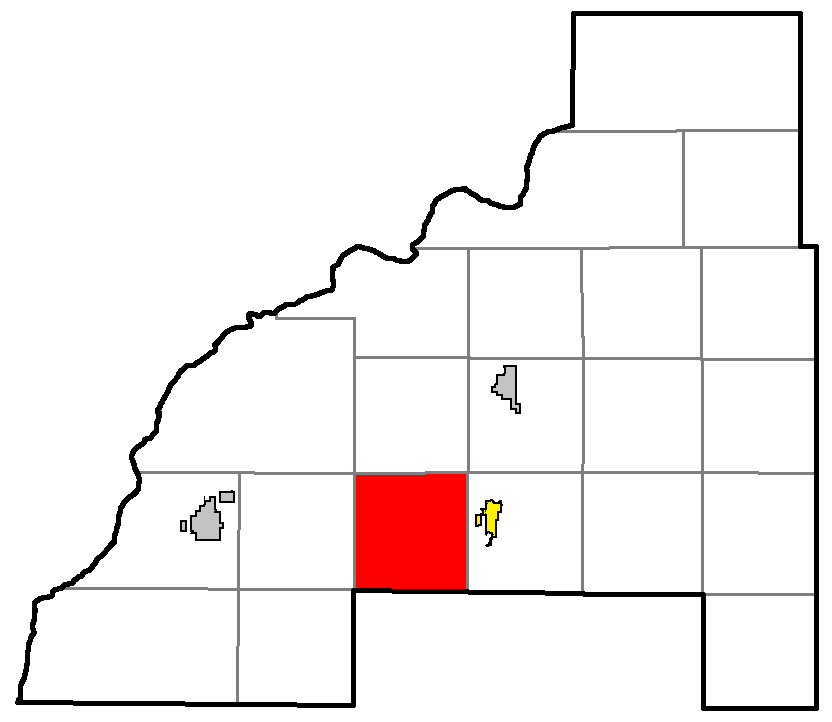
- Location of Daniels, within Burnett County
- Coordinates: 45°45′11″N 92°28′14″W
- Country: United States
- State: Wisconsin
- County: Burnett
- Established: 1874

Government
  - Type: Town

Area
  - Total: 35.8 sq mi (92.6 km^{2})
  - Land: 33.7 sq mi (87.3 km^{2})
  - Water: 2.1 sq mi (5.4 km^{2})
- Elevation: 981 ft (299 m)

Population (2020)
  - Total: 676
  - Density: 20.1/sq mi (7.74/km^{2})
- Time zone: UTC-6 (Central (CST))
  - Summer (DST): UTC-5 (CDT)
- Area codes: 715 & 534
- FIPS code: 55-18750
- GNIS feature ID: 1583049
- Website: townofdaniels.com

Daniels is a town in Burnett County in the U.S. state of Wisconsin. The population was 676 at the 2020 census. The unincorporated community of Falun is located within the town.

== History ==
Originally named Wood Lake, the town's name was changed in 1906 to honor Daniel Johnson, who was an early town chairman.

== Geography ==
Daniels is located in southern Burnett County and is bordered by Polk County to the south. According to the United States Census Bureau, the town has a total area of 35.8 square miles (92.6 km^{2}), of which 33.7 square miles (87.3 km^{2}) is land and 2.1 square miles (5.4 km^{2}), or 5.80%, is water. At least 12 named lakes are fully or partially in the town, the largest of which is Mud Hen Lake, west of the town's geographic center and east of Falun.

== Demographics ==
As of the census of 2000, there were 665 people, 280 households, and 204 families residing in the town. The population density was 19.7 people per square mile (7.6 people/km^{2}). There were 429 housing units at an average density of 12.7 per square mile (4.9/km^{2}). The racial makeup of the town was 97.44% White, 0.30% Native American, 0.30% Asian, 0.15% Pacific Islander, 0.45% from other races, and 1.35% from two or more races. Hispanic or Latino of any race were 0.45% of the population.

There were 280 households. Of these, 24.3% had children under the age of 18 living with them, 63.6% were married couples living together, 5.0% had a female householder with no husband present, and 26.8% were non-families. 23.6% of all households were made up of individuals, and 11.4% had someone living alone who was 65 years of age or older. The average household size was 2.38 and the average family size was 2.80.

In the town, the population was spread out, with 20.5% under the age of 18, 5.3% from 18 to 24, 24.8% from 25 to 44, 29.3% from 45 to 64, and 20.2% who were 65 years of age or older. The median age was 45 years. For every 100 females, there were 105.2 males. For every 100 females age 18 and over, there were 104.2 males.

The median income for a household in the town was $36,597, and the median income for a family was $46,917. Males had a median income of $33,681 versus $25,385 for females. The per capita income for the town was $19,081. About 7.0% of families and 8.5% of the population were below the poverty line, including 8.3% of those under age 18 and 15.0% of those age 65 or over.
