= Swiss, Wisconsin =

- Town
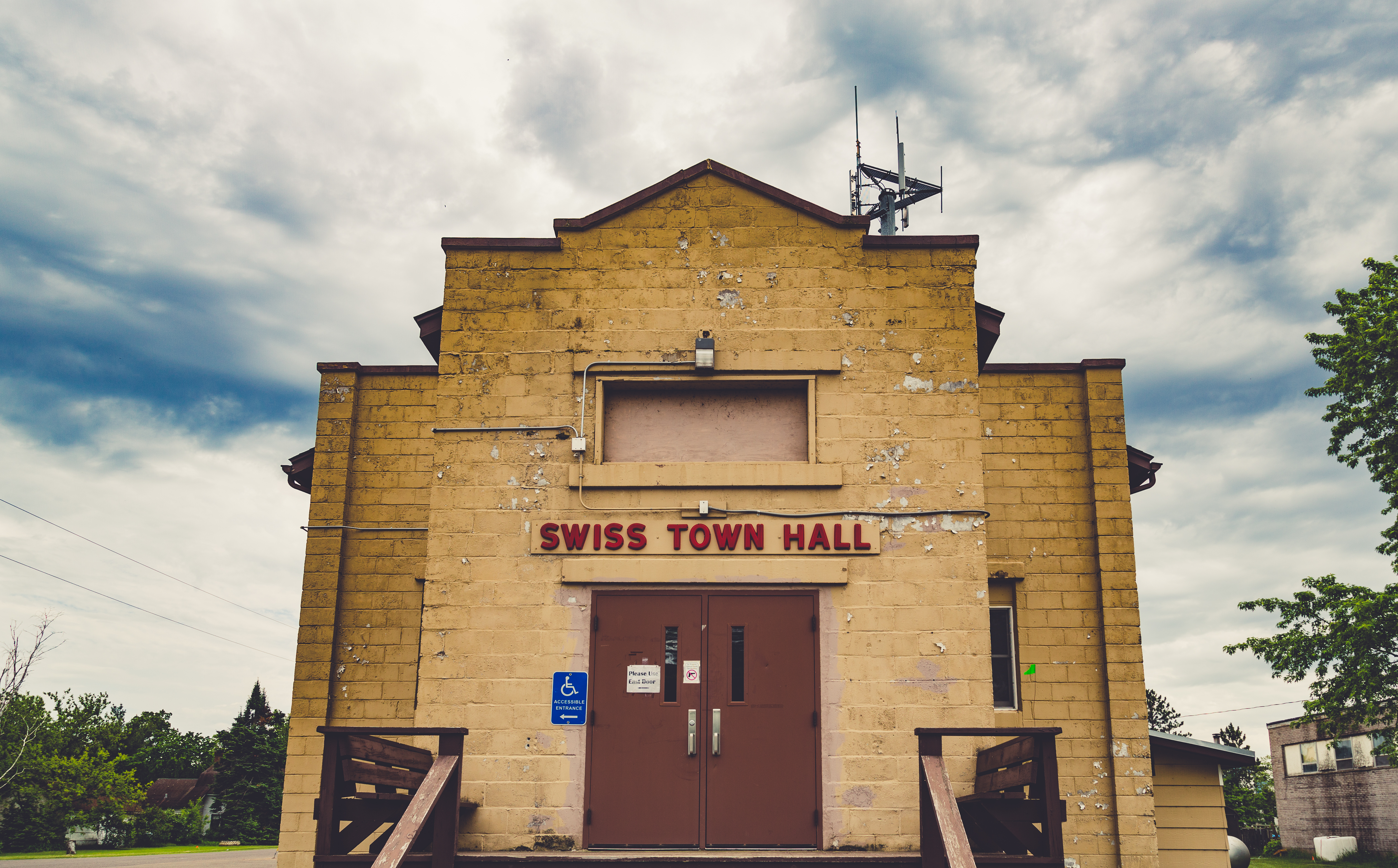

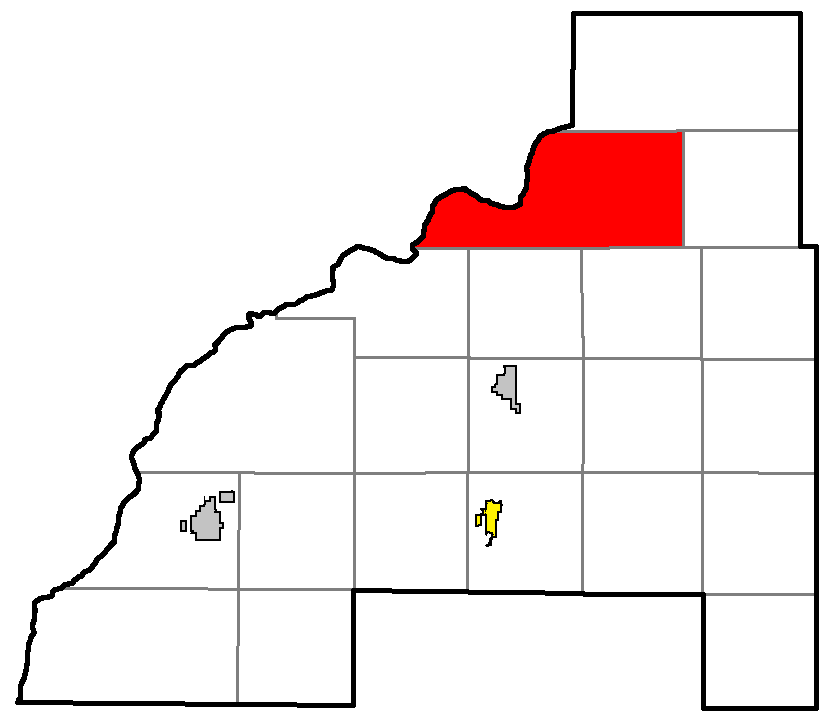
- Location of Swiss, within Burnett County
- Coordinates: 46°0′59″N 92°17′29″W
- Country: United States
- State: Wisconsin
- County: Burnett

Area
  - Total: 60.7 sq mi (157.3 km^{2})
  - Land: 57.5 sq mi (148.8 km^{2})
  - Water: 3.3 sq mi (8.5 km^{2})
- Elevation: 974 ft (297 m)

Population (2020)
  - Total: 807
  - Density: 14.0/sq mi (5.42/km^{2})
- Time zone: UTC-6 (Central (CST))
  - Summer (DST): UTC-5 (CDT)
- Area codes: 715 & 534
- FIPS code: 55-78775
- GNIS feature ID: 1584262
- Website: https://townofswiss.com/

Swiss is a town in Burnett County in the U.S. state of Wisconsin. The population was 807 at the 2020 census. The unincorporated community of Danbury is located within the town.

== Geography ==
Swiss is located in northern Burnett County along the St. Croix River, which forms the Wisconsin–Minnesota border. The Yellow River enters the town from the south and drops 60 feet (18 m) in just over a mile before joining the St. Croix River at Danbury.

According to the United States Census Bureau, the town of Swiss has a total area of 60.7 square miles (157.3 km^{2}), of which 57.5 square miles (148.8 km^{2}) is land and 3.3 square miles (8.5 km^{2}), or 5.40%, is water.

== Demographics ==
As of the census of 2000, there were 815 people, 336 households, and 223 families residing in the town. The population density was 14.2 people per square mile (5.5/km^{2}). There were 833 housing units at an average density of 14.5 per square mile (5.6/km^{2}). The racial makeup of the town was 77.06% White, 0.25% African American, 17.67% Native American, 0.37% Asian, 0.12% from other races, and 4.54% from two or more races. Hispanic or Latino of any race were 0.98% of the population.

There were 336 households, out of which 24.1% had children under the age of 18 living with them, 49.4% were married couples living together, 11.3% had a female householder with no husband present, and 33.6% were non-families. 26.8% of all households were made up of individuals, and 13.7% had someone living alone who was 65 years of age or older. The average household size was 2.43 and the average family size was 2.84.

In the town, the population was spread out, with 22.7% under the age of 18, 6.6% from 18 to 24, 24.0% from 25 to 44, 27.1% from 45 to 64, and 19.5% who were 65 years of age or older. The median age was 43 years. For every 100 females, there were 100.7 males. For every 100 females age 18 and over, there were 93.3 males.

The median income for a household in the town was $30,461, and the median income for a family was $34,219. Males had a median income of $26,607 versus $20,313 for females. The per capita income for the town was $16,870. About 9.2% of families and 10.2% of the population were below the poverty line, including 13.7% of those under age 18 and 6.1% of those age 65 or over.
