= Siren, Wisconsin =

- Village
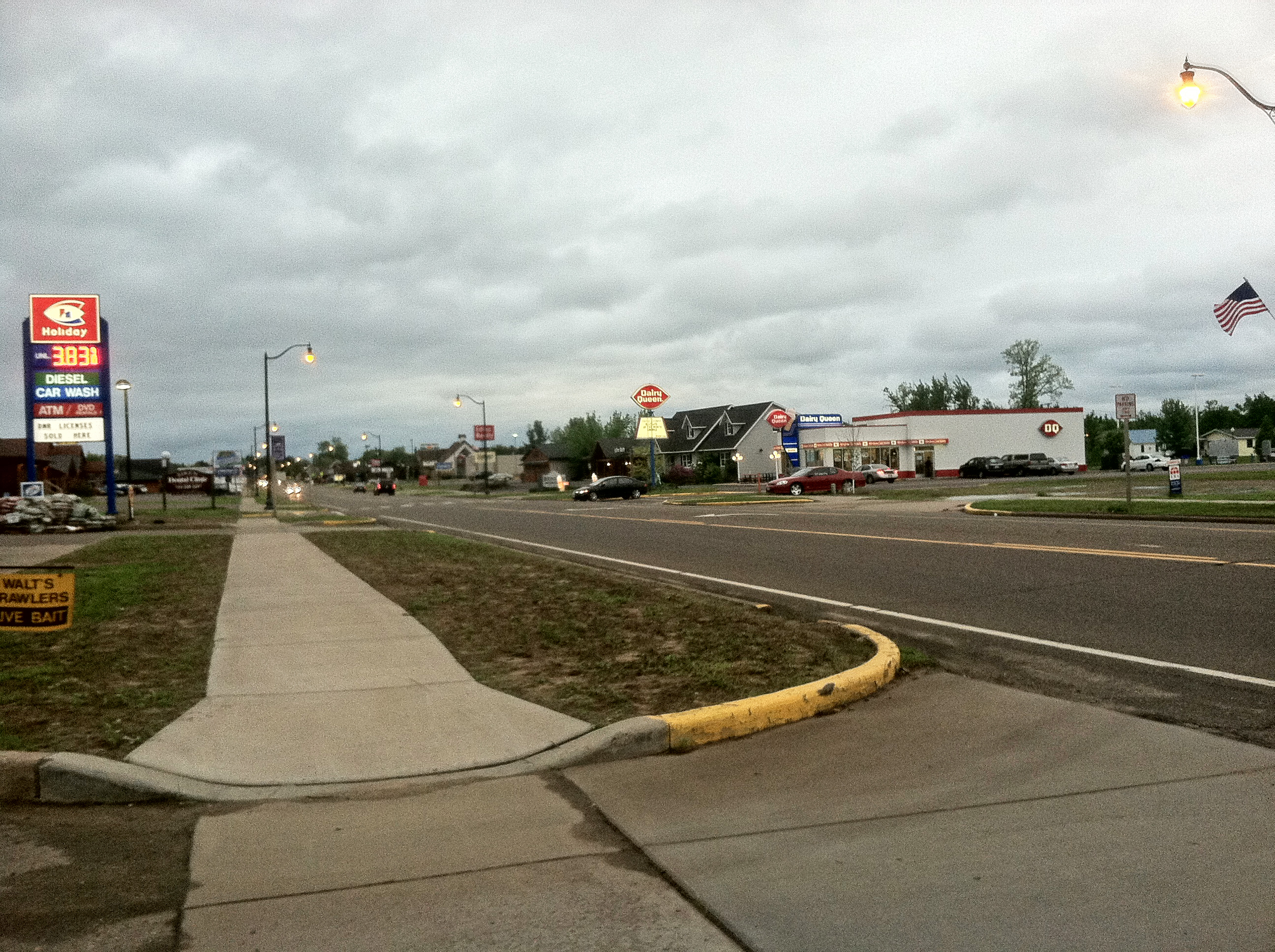
- Siren along Wisconsin Highway 35 / 70, co-signed.

- Location of Siren in Burnett County, Wisconsin.
- Coordinates: 45°46′20″N 92°21′27″W
- Country: United States
- State: Wisconsin
- County: Burnett

Area
  - Total: 1.23 sq mi (3.19 km^{2})
  - Land: 1.20 sq mi (3.10 km^{2})
  - Water: 0.031 sq mi (0.08 km^{2})
- Elevation: 965 ft (294 m)

Population (2020)
  - Total: 824
  - Density: 688/sq mi (266/km^{2})
- Time zone: UTC-6 (Central (CST))
  - Summer (DST): UTC-5 (CDT)
- ZIP Code: 54872
- Area codes: 715 & 534
- FIPS code: 55-74200
- GNIS feature ID: 1584164
- Website: https://www.villageofsirenwi.gov/

Siren is a village in, and the county seat of, Burnett County in the U.S. state of Wisconsin. The population was 824 at the 2020 census. The village is surrounded by the Town of Siren.

== History ==
The Ojibwe and the French fur traders were the principal inhabitants of the region in the early 1800s.

Swedish immigrants began settling in the area around what is now Siren in the 1880s. Many of them were members of the Evangelical Covenant Church. The first post office was built in 1895 about a mile west of its present location. The first postmaster was Charles F. Segerstrom, who had the post office in his home. His home was surrounded by lilacs, which are quite abundant in the area. Segerstrom applied with the postal department for a name for the place, choosing "Syren", Swedish for "lilac." Presumably the postal department thought this was a misspelling, for on the granted application they put down the spelling as "Siren." In 1912, the town center was moved nearer to the Soo Line Railroad tracks, which had been extended north through the area to Superior, Wisconsin and Duluth, Minnesota. The tracks were later removed but the trail was left behind for recreational purposes. It is now known as the Gandy Dancer State Trail and is a popular route for hikers, bicyclists, and snowmobilers.

On June 18, 2001, an F3 tornado passed through Siren, inflicting severe damage. Three people died; 175 buildings were destroyed and many more damaged. Since then much of the town has been rebuilt with its architecture reflecting Siren's history.

== Geography ==
Siren is located at 45°47′1″N 92°22′48″W (45.783633, -92.380161).

According to the United States Census Bureau, the village has an area of 1.28 square miles (3.32 km^{2}), of which 1.24 square miles (3.21 km^{2}) is land and 0.04 square miles (0.10 km^{2}) is water.

Siren is surrounded by several lakes including Big Doctor Lake, Clam Lake, Crooked Lake, Fish Lake, and Long Lake.

== Demographics ==
Historical population
Census	Pop.	Note	%±
1950	613		—
1960	679		10.8%
1970	639		−5.9%
1980	896		40.2%
1990	863		−3.7%
2000	988		14.5%
2010	806		−18.4%
2020	824		2.2%
2024 (est.)	927		12.5%
U.S. Decennial Census

=== 2010 census ===
As of the 2010 census, Siren had a population of 806 people. The population density was 631.2 people per square mile (243.7/km^{2}). The racial makeup of Siren was 725 (90.0%) white, 2 (0.2%) African-American, 33 (4.1%) American Indian or Alaska native, 3 (0.4%) Asian, 0 (0.0%) native Hawaiian or Pacific Islander, and 4 (0.5%) from another race; 39 (4.8%) of the residents were from two or more races. 19 people (2.4%) were Hispanic or Latino of any race.

The population was distributed by age with 57 residents (7.1%) under the age of 5, 42 (5.2%) aged 5 to 9, 55 (6.8%) aged 10 to 14, 48 (6.0%) aged 15 to 19, 28 (3.5%) aged 20 to 24, 47 (5.8%) aged 25 to 29, 42 (5.2%) aged 30 to 34, 49 (6.1%) aged 35 to 39, 53 (6.6%) aged 40 to 44, 54 (6.7%) aged 45 to 49, 53 (6.6%) aged 50 to 54, 52 (6.5%) aged 55 to 59, 41 (5.1%) aged 60 to 64, 51 (6.3%) aged 65 to 69, 35 (4.3%) aged 70 to 74, 38 (4.7%) aged 75 to 79, 32 (4.0%) aged 80 to 84, and 29 (3.6%) aged 85 and over.

Siren had 376 households, of which 212 (56.4%) were families, 96 (25.5%) had children under 18 years of age, 141 (37.5%) were opposite-sex couples, 48 (12.8%) were families with a female householder and no husband, and 23 (6.1%) were families with a male householder and no wife. 164 households (43.6%) were not families, with 148 (20.0%) consisting of a single householder and 73 (19.4%) consisting of a single householder 65 years or older. The average household size was 2.12 people, and the average family size was 2.76 people. 798 people lived in households, 0 were institutionalized, and 8 lived in noninstitutional group quarters.

Siren had 490 housing units, of which 376 were occupied; there were 383.7 housing units per square mile of land (148.1/km^{2}). 223 (59.3%) housing units were owner-occupied, while 153 (40.7%) were occupied by renters. 511 people lived in owner-occupied housing units, while 287 lived in renter-occupied housing units. The homeowner vacancy rate was 4.7%, and the rental vacancy rate was 10.9%.

=== 2000 census ===
As of the census of 2000, there were 988 people, 413 households, and 230 families residing in the village. The population density was 895.1 people per square mile (346.8/km^{2}). There were 499 housing units at an average density of 452.1 per square mile (175.1/km^{2}). The racial makeup of the village was 95.85% White, 0.10% Black or African American, 2.02% Native American, 0.30% Asian, 0.10% Pacific Islander, 0.10% from other races, and 1.52% from two or more races. 0.10% of the population were Hispanic or Latino of any race.

There were 413 households, out of which 26.9% had children under the age of 18 living with them, 40.7% were married couples living together, 10.9% had a female householder with no husband present, and 44.3% were non-families. 39.2% of all households were made up of individuals, and 18.4% had someone living alone who was 65 years of age or older. The average household size was 2.15 and the average family size was 2.85.

In the village, the population was spread out, with 22.2% under the age of 18, 6.7% from 18 to 24, 24.6% from 25 to 44, 19.6% from 45 to 64, and 26.9% who were 65 years of age or older. The median age was 42 years. For every 100 females, there were 90.0 males. For every 100 females age 18 and over, there were 90.3 males.

The median income for a household in the village was $24,342, and the median income for a family was $31,797. Males had a median income of $27,250 versus $21,635 for females. The per capita income for the village was $14,792. About 12.0% of families and 18.3% of the population were below the poverty line, including 22.6% of those under age 18 and 18.9% of those age 65 or over.

== Government ==
Siren is the county seat of Burnett County. It is governed by a village board, consisting of a president and six trustees.

Presidential elections results

Presidential elections results
Year	Republican	Democratic	Third parties
2024	61.5% 270	36.9% 162	1.6% 7
2020	62.4% 262	36.7% 154	0.9% 4
2016	60.9% 218	35.5% 127	3.6% 13
2012	47.9% 170	51.3% 182	0.8% 3
2008	42.2% 165	57.5% 225	0.3% 3
2004	49.5% 214	50.0% 216	0.5% 2
2000	43.0% 168	52.4% 205	0.5% 18

== Transportation ==
=== Major highways ===
- Wisconsin Highway 35 – 2nd Avenue within Siren
- Wisconsin Highway 70
- Burnett County Road B

=== Airport ===
- Burnett County Airport (KRZN) serves the village and surrounding communities.

== Notable people ==
- Molly Engstrom, USA hockey player in 2006 and 2010 Olympics

== Bibliography ==
- Thomas, Chad. Seasons without Shade: Remembering the Siren Tornado. St. Paul, MN: Lilac Press, 2002. ISBN 0-929636-16-3.
