= Blaine, Wisconsin =

- Town
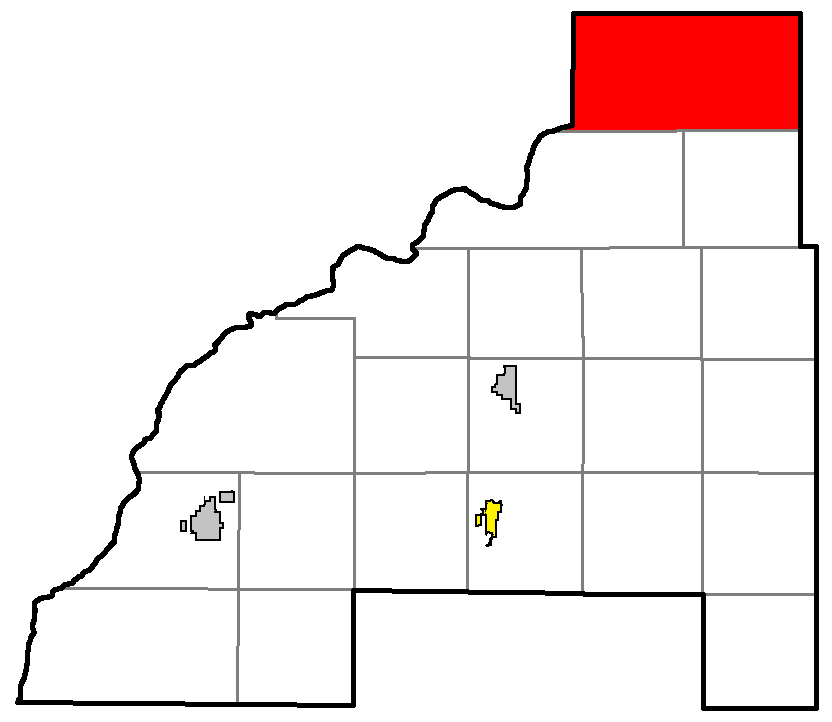
- Location of Blaine, within Burnett County
- Coordinates: 46°6′41″N 92°9′11″W
- Country: United States
- State: Wisconsin
- County: Burnett

Area
  - Total: 70.3 sq mi (182.1 km^{2})
  - Land: 68.6 sq mi (177.6 km^{2})
  - Water: 1.7 sq mi (4.4 km^{2})
- Elevation: 1,020 ft (310 m)

Population (2020)
  - Total: 206
  - Density: 3.00/sq mi (1.16/km^{2})
- Time zone: UTC-6 (Central (CST))
  - Summer (DST): UTC-5 (CDT)
- Area codes: 715 & 534
- FIPS code: 55-08025
- GNIS feature ID: 1582825
- Website: townofblainewi.com

Blaine is a town in Burnett County in the U.S. state of Wisconsin. The population was 206 at the 2020 census. The unincorporated communities of Riverside and Woodland Corner are located in the town.

== Geography ==
Blaine occupies the northern end of Burnett County. It is bordered to the east by Washburn County and to the north by Douglas County, both in Wisconsin, and to the west by Pine County, Minnesota. The St. Croix River flows through the town from northeast to southwest, reaching the Minnesota border and becoming the state line about one mile northeast of the southwest corner of the town. The Namekagon River enters the town from the southeast and joins the St. Croix in the south-central part of the town. The Totagatic River enters the town from the east and joins the Namekagon River 3 miles (5 km) west of the town's eastern border.

According to the United States Census Bureau, the town has a total area of 70.3 square miles (182.1 km^{2}), of which 68.6 square miles (177.6 km^{2}) is land and 1.7 square miles (4.4 km^{2}), or 2.43%, is water.

== Demographics ==
As of the census of 2000, there were 224 people, 97 households, and 65 families residing in the town. The population density was 3.3 people per square mile (1.3/km^{2}). There were 238 housing units at an average density of 3.5 per square mile (1.3/km^{2}). The racial makeup of the town was 91.07% White, 0.89% African American, 1.34% Native American, 1.34% from other races, and 5.36% from two or more races. Hispanic or Latino of any race were 0.45% of the population.

There were 97 households, out of which 21.6% had children under the age of 18 living with them, 58.8% were married couples living together, 4.1% had a female householder with no husband present, and 32.0% were non-families. 29.9% of all households were made up of individuals, and 15.5% had someone living alone who was 65 years of age or older. The average household size was 2.31 and the average family size was 2.82.

In the town, the population was spread out, with 19.6% under the age of 18, 4.0% from 18 to 24, 20.5% from 25 to 44, 26.8% from 45 to 64, and 29.0% who were 65 years of age or older. The median age was 50 years. For every 100 females, there were 96.5 males. For every 100 females age 18 and over, there were 95.7 males.

The median income for a household in the town was $31,250, and the median income for a family was $34,531. Males had a median income of $39,375 versus $18,125 for females. The per capita income for the town was $12,895. About 6.8% of families and 15.3% of the population were below the poverty line, including 16.3% of those under the age of eighteen and 27.3% of those 65 or over.
