= Siren (town), Wisconsin =

Town in Wisconsin, United States

Siren, Wisconsin
- Town
- Town of Siren
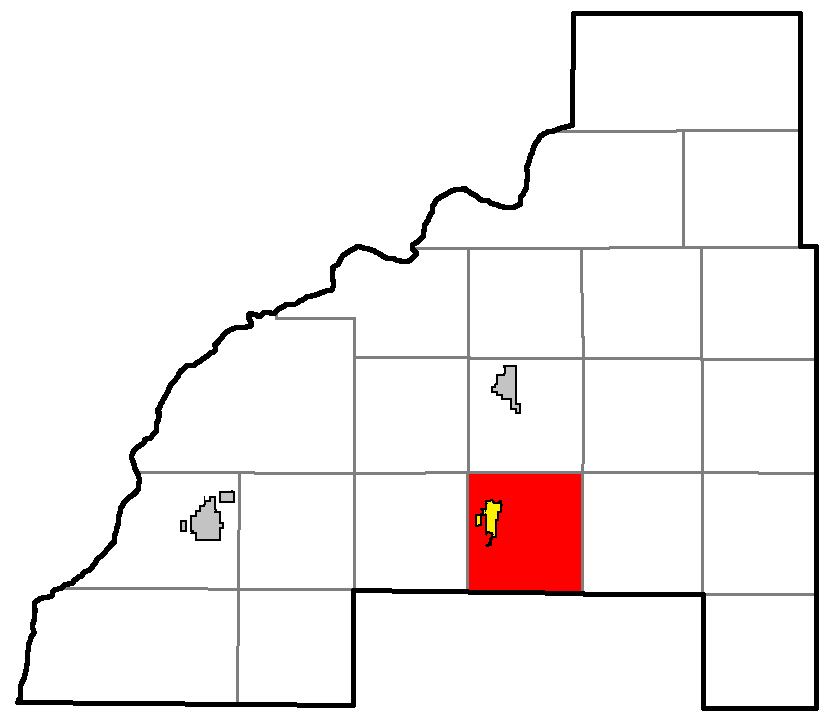
- Location of Siren, within Burnett County
- Coordinates: 45°46′15″N 92°19′55″W
- Country: United States
- State: Wisconsin
- County: Burnett

Area
  - Total: 35.72 sq mi (92.5 km^{2})
  - Land: 31.26 sq mi (81.0 km^{2})
  - Water: 4.46 sq mi (11.6 km^{2})

Population (2020)
  - Total: 1,004
  - Density: 32.12/sq mi (12.40/km^{2})
- Time zone: UTC-6 (Central (CST))
  - Summer (DST): UTC-5 (CDT)
- Area code(s): 715 & 534
- GNIS feature ID: 1584165

Siren is a town in Burnett County in the U.S. state of Wisconsin. The population was 1,004 at the 2020 census. The village of Siren is located within the town.

== Geography ==
The Town of Siren is located in southern Burnett County, with Polk County along its southern border. The village of Siren, a municipality fully surrounded by the Town of Siren, is located west of the geographic center of the town.

According to the United States Census Bureau, the town has a total area of 35.8 square miles (92.8 km^{2}), of which 31.4 square miles (81.3 km^{2}) is land and 4.4 square miles (11.5 km^{2}), or 12.40%, is water. There are 15 named lakes wholly or partially in the town, of which Clam Lake along the Clam River is the largest.

== Demographics ==
As of the census of 2000, there were 873 people, 378 households, and 266 families residing in the town. The population density was 27.8 people per square mile (10.7/km^{2}). There were 717 housing units at an average density of 22.8 per square mile (8.8/km^{2}). The racial makeup of the town was 97.14% White, 0.11% Black or African American, 1.60% Native American, 0.11% Asian, 0.11% Pacific Islander, 0.11% from other races, and 0.80% from two or more races. 0.92% of the population were Hispanic or Latino of any race.

There were 378 households, out of which 25.9% had children under the age of 18 living with them, 57.4% were married couples living together, 7.9% had a female householder with no husband present, and 29.4% were non-families. 23.0% of all households comprised individuals, and 11.4% had someone living alone who was 65 or older. The average household size was 2.31 and the average family size was 2.68.

In the town, the population was spread out, with 21.9% under the age of 18, 4.8% from 18 to 24, 22.8% from 25 to 44, 29.9% from 45 to 64, and 20.6% who were 65 years of age or older. The median age was 45 years. For every 100 females, there were 107.9 males. For every 100 females age 18 and over, there were 106.0 males.

The median income for a household in the town was $36,397, and the median income for a family was $40,781. Males had a median income of $31,726 versus $20,179 for females. The per capita income for the town was $19,434. About 2.4% of families and 6.1% of the population were below the poverty line, including 9.8% of those under age 18 and 3.2% of those age 65 or over.
