= Maple Plain =

Maple Plain can refer to a community in the United States:

- Maple Plain, Minnesota, a city
- Maple Plain, Wisconsin, a town
