= George Mireau =

American farmer and politician

George Quimby Mireau (September 6, 1888 – October 2, 1973) was an American farmer and politician.

Born in Doyle, Wisconsin, Mireau was a farmer in Barron County, Wisconsin. He served as chairman of the town of Rice Lake and on the Barron County, Wisconsin Board of Supervisors. Mireau also served on the board of directors of a butter and cheese company. He was elected to the Wisconsin State Assembly as a Democrat in 1958. Mireau died in Eau Claire, Wisconsin.
