= Cedar Lake, Wisconsin =

- Town
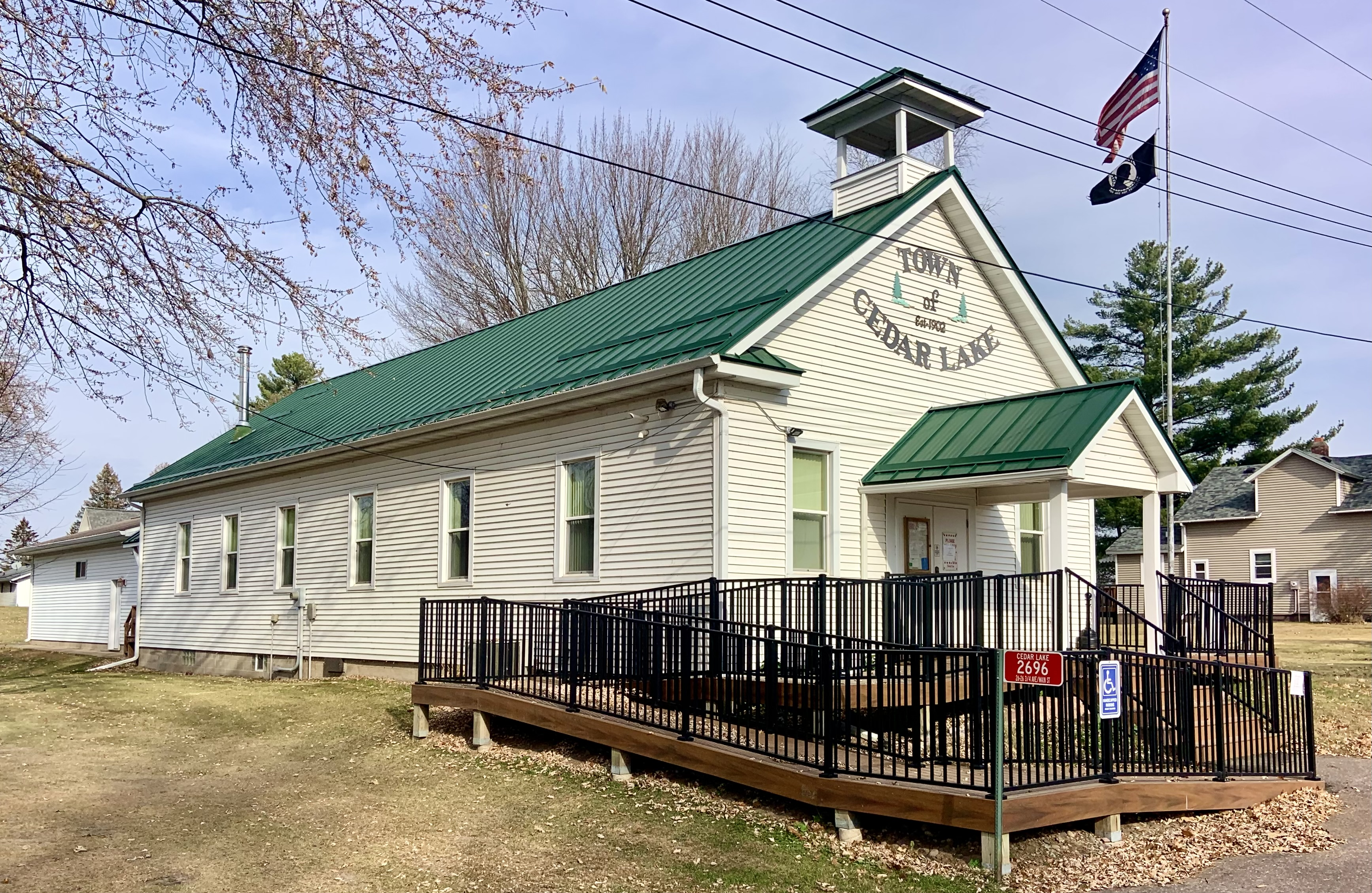
- Town hall in Mikana
- Motto: "Where Everyone Is Friendly!"
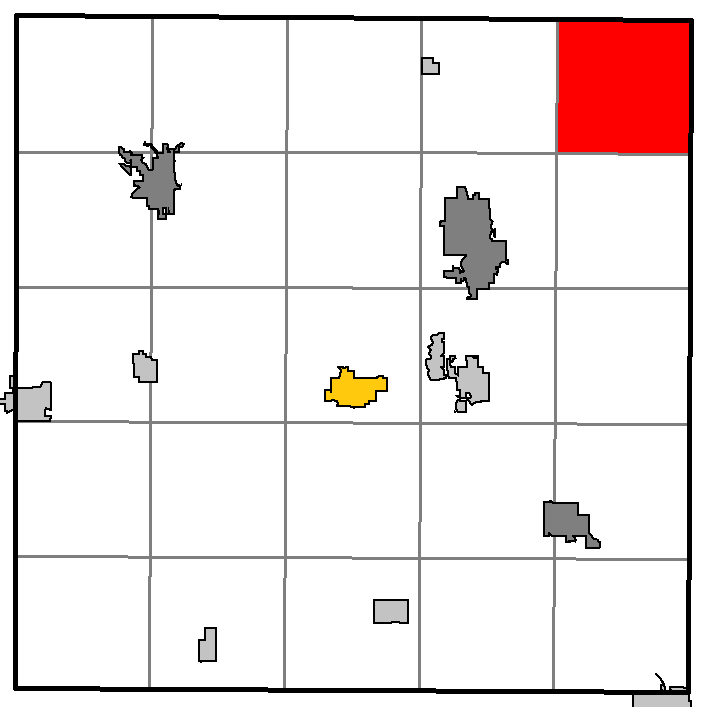
- Location of Cedar Lake, Barron County, Wisconsin

- Location of Barron County, Wisconsin
- Coordinates: 45°36′39″N 91°35′19″W
- Country: United States
- State: Wisconsin
- County: Barron

Area
  - Total: 35.4 sq mi (91.7 km^{2})
  - Land: 31.3 sq mi (81.1 km^{2})
  - Water: 4.1 sq mi (10.5 km^{2})
- Elevation: 1,198 ft (365 m)

Population (2020)
  - Total: 1,076
  - Density: 34.4/sq mi (13.3/km^{2})
- Time zone: UTC-6 (Central (CST))
  - Summer (DST): UTC-5 (CDT)
- Area codes: 715 & 534
- FIPS code: 55-13500
- GNIS feature ID: 1582939
- Website: townofcedarlake.org

Cedar Lake is a town in Barron County in the U.S. state of Wisconsin. The population was 1,076 at the 2020 census, up from 948 at the 2010 census. The unincorporated communities of Angus and Mikana are located in the town.

== History ==
The Ojibwa were among the first to inhabit the area. In the late 1860s, the town developed from the logging industry.

S.A. Jewett Company established two logging camps in the area in 1875. Knapp, Stout & Co. purchased the S.A. Jewett Company and continued logging in the area until 1900.

== Geography ==
The town of Cedar Lake occupies the northeastern corner of Barron County. Red Cedar Lake is in the eastern part of the town, running north–south across nearly the entire town and ending in the south in the connected Hemlock Lake. The outlet of the lake, at Mikana just east of the geographic center of the town, is the source of the Red Cedar River, a tributary of the Chippewa River.

Wisconsin Highway 48 crosses the town from north to south, passing through Angus and Mikana.

According to the United States Census Bureau, the town has a total area of 35.4 square miles (91.7 km^{2}), of which 31.3 square miles (81.1 km^{2}) is land and 4.1 square miles (10.5 km^{2}), or 11.48%, is water.

== Demographics ==
As of the census of 2000, there were 944 people, 395 households, and 304 families residing in the town. The population density was 30.1 people per square mile (11.6/km^{2}). There were 765 housing units at an average density of 24.4 per square mile (9.4/km^{2}). The racial makeup of the town was 99.79% White, 0.11% Native American, and 0.11% from two or more races. Hispanic or Latino people of any race were 0.11% of the population.

There were 395 households, out of which 23.8% had children under the age of 18 living with them, 70.9% were married couples living together, 2.3% had a female householder with no husband present, and 23.0% were non-families. 18.2% of all households were made up of individuals, and 8.9% had someone living alone who was 65 years of age or older. The average household size was 2.39 and the average family size was 2.70.

In the town, the population was spread out, with 19.3% under the age of 18, 6.1% from 18 to 24, 23.5% from 25 to 44, 30.7% from 45 to 64, and 20.3% who were 65 years of age or older. The median age was 46 years. For every 100 females, there were 110.7 males. For every 100 females age 18 and over, there were 104.3 males.

The median income for a household in the town was $40,536, and the median income for a family was $45,750. Males had a median income of $31,591 versus $19,554 for females. The per capita income for the town was $25,087. About 2.9% of families and 5.0% of the population were below the poverty line, including 9.6% of those under age 18 and 4.3% of those age 65 or over.
