= Sumner, Wisconsin =

Sumner is the name of some places in the U.S. state of Wisconsin:

- Sumner, Barron County, Wisconsin, a town
  - Sumner (community), Barron County, Wisconsin, an unincorporated community
- Sumner, Jefferson County, Wisconsin, a town
- Sumner, Trempealeau County, Wisconsin, a town
