= Twin Town, Wisconsin =

- Unincorporated community
- Location within Wisconsin Location within the United States
- Coordinates: 45°21′36″N 92°01′57″W
- Country: United States
- State: Wisconsin
- County: Barron
- Towns: Arland, Turtle Lake
- Elevation: 1,220 ft (370 m)
- Time zone: UTC-6 (Central (CST))
  - Summer (DST): UTC-5 (CDT)
- Area codes: 715 and 534
- GNIS feature ID: 1577862

Twin Town is an unincorporated community located in the towns of Arland and Turtle Lake, Barron County, Wisconsin, United States.
