= Crystal Lake, Barron County, Wisconsin =

Crystal Lake, Wisconsin
- Town
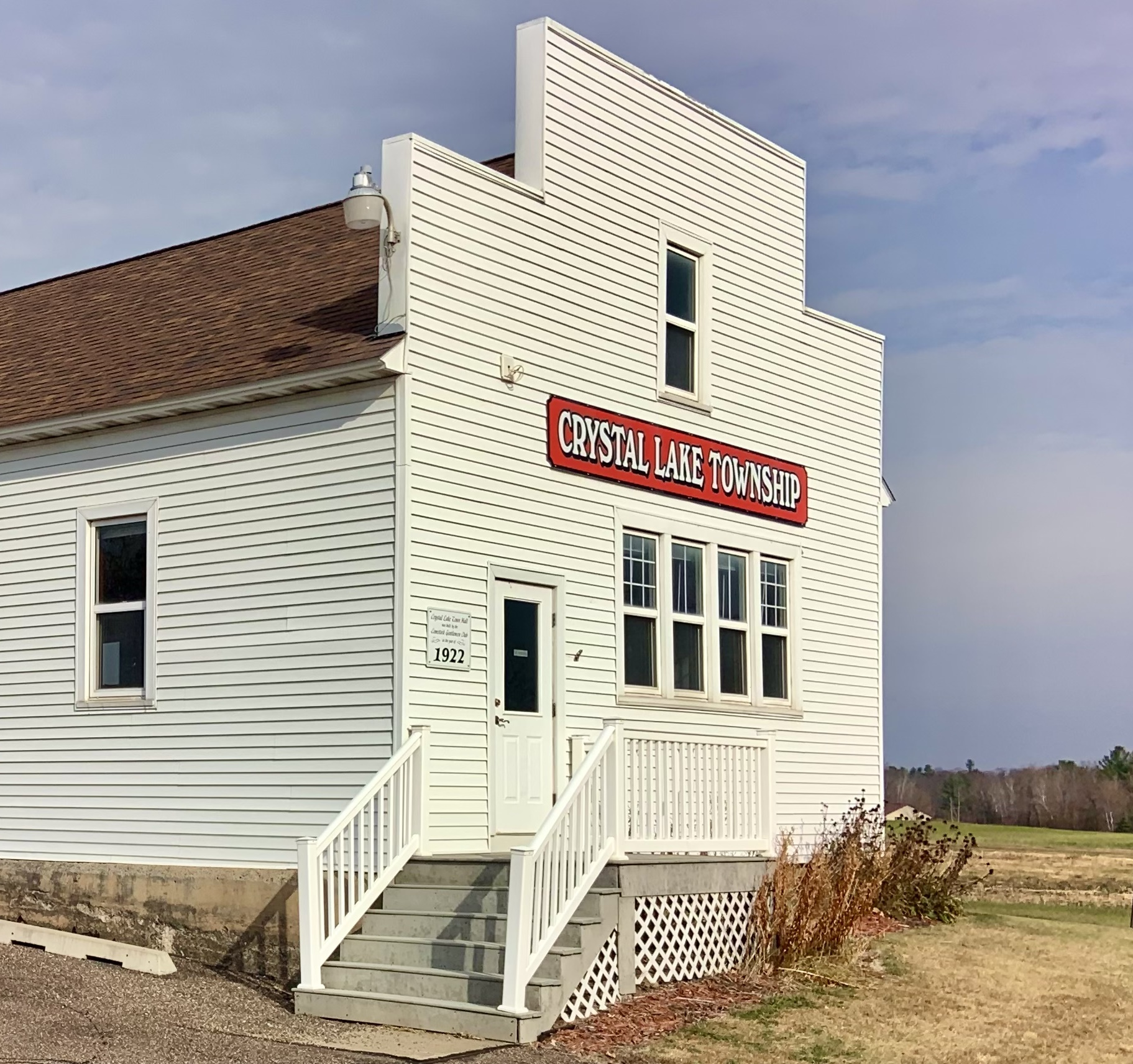
- Town hall

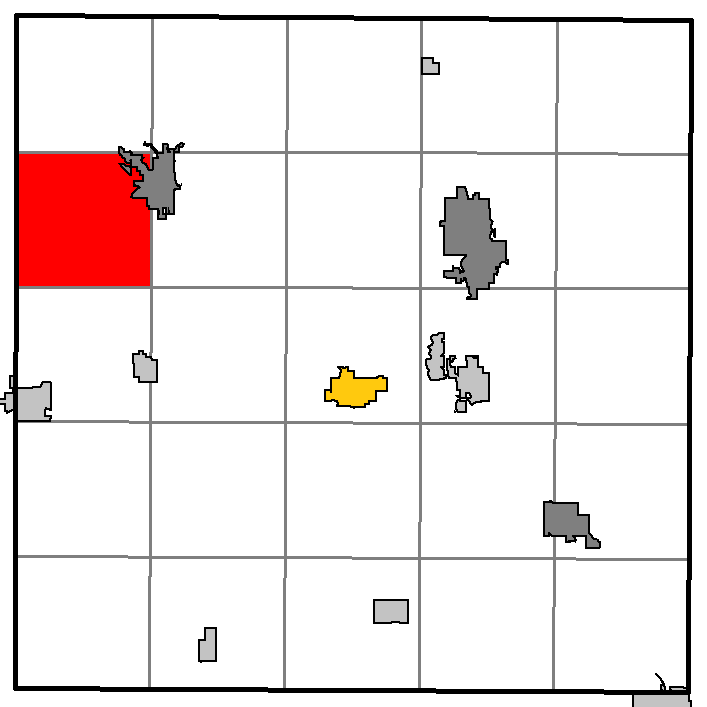
- Location of Crystal Lake, within Barron County, Wisconsin

- Location of Barron County, Wisconsin
- Coordinates: 45°30′28″N 92°5′54″W
- Country: United States
- State: Wisconsin
- County: Barron

Area
  - Total: 34.6 sq mi (89.5 km^{2})
  - Land: 32.8 sq mi (85.0 km^{2})
  - Water: 1.7 sq mi (4.5 km^{2})
- Elevation: 1,280 ft (390 m)

Population (2020)
  - Total: 743
  - Density: 22.6/sq mi (8.74/km^{2})
- Time zone: UTC-6 (Central (CST))
  - Summer (DST): UTC-5 (CDT)
- Area codes: 715 & 534
- FIPS code: 55-17875
- GNIS feature ID: 1583032

Crystal Lake is a town in Barron County in the U.S. state of Wisconsin. The population was 743 at the 2020 census, down from 757 at the 2010 census. The unincorporated community of Comstock is located in the town.

== Geography ==
The town is located in western Barron County; the western border of the town is with Polk County. The town shares its name with a small lake in the south-central part of the town. Several other named lakes, the largest of which is Beaver Dam Lake, are wholly or partly in the town. U.S. Route 63 crosses the town from south to northeast, where it enters the adjacent city of Cumberland.

According to the United States Census Bureau, the town has a total area of 34.6 square miles (89.5 km^{2}), of which 32.8 square miles (85.0 km^{2}) is land and 1.7 square miles (4.5 km^{2}), or 5.04%, is water.

== Demographics ==
As of the census of 2000, there were 778 people, 312 households, and 223 families residing in the town. The population density was 23.8 people per square mile (9.2/km^{2}). There were 435 housing units at an average density of 13.3 per square mile (5.1/km^{2}). The racial makeup of the town was 98.20% White, 0.13% African American, 0.90% Native American, 0.13% Asian, and 0.64% from two or more races. Hispanic or Latino people of any race were 0.51% of the population.

There were 312 households, out of which 28.2% had children under the age of 18 living with them, 62.8% were married couples living together, 5.1% had a female householder with no husband present, and 28.5% were non-families. 21.2% of all households were made up of individuals, and 9.0% had someone living alone who was 65 years of age or older. The average household size was 2.47 and the average family size was 2.90.

In the town, the population was spread out, with 23.4% under the age of 18, 7.1% from 18 to 24, 28.0% from 25 to 44, 24.7% from 45 to 64, and 16.8% who were 65 years of age or older. The median age was 41 years. For every 100 females, there were 101.0 males. For every 100 females age 18 and over, there were 102.0 males.

The median income for a household in the town was $37,109, and the median income for a family was $42,386. Males had a median income of $30,972 versus $21,974 for females. The per capita income for the town was $16,040. About 6.0% of families and 11.2% of the population were below the poverty line, including 10.3% of those under age 18 and 17.6% of those age 65 or over.
