= Clinton, Barron County, Wisconsin =

Clinton, Wisconsin
- Town
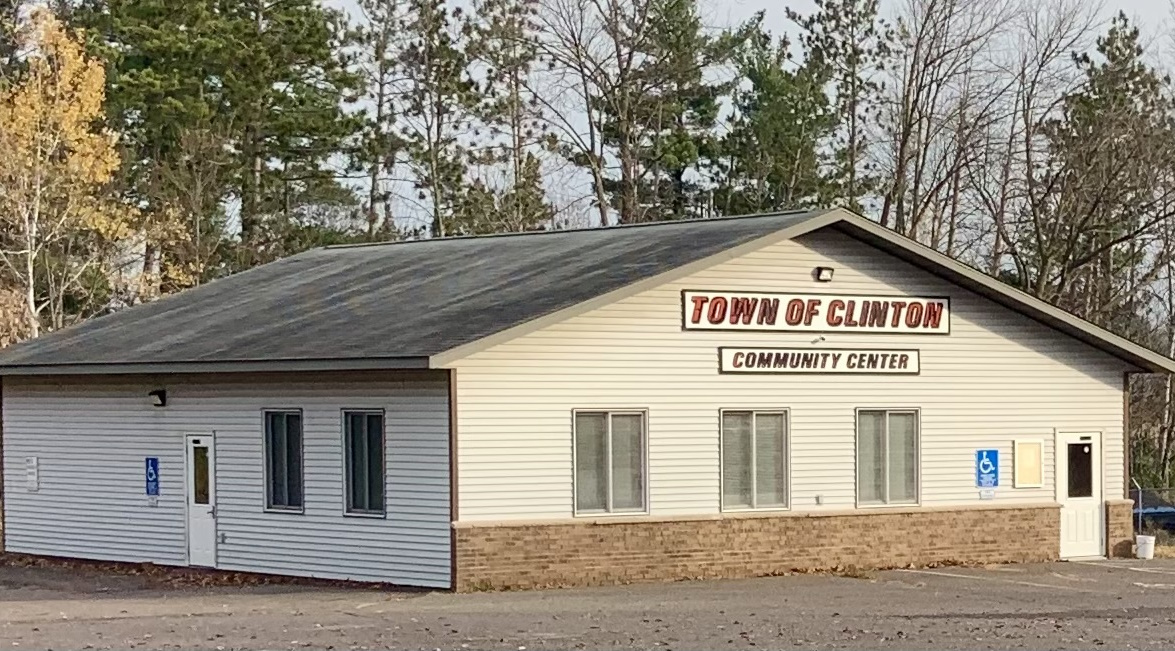
- Town hall

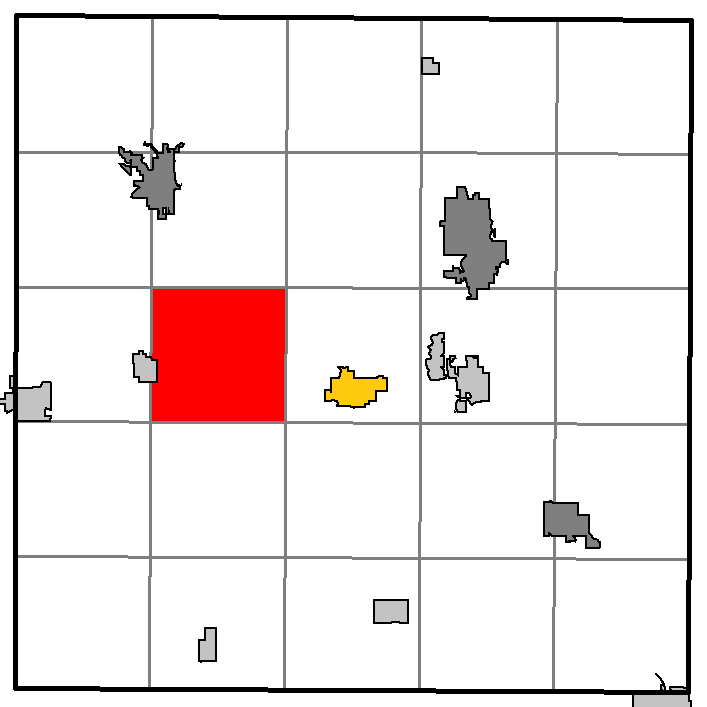
- Location of Clinton, within Barron County, Wisconsin

- Location of Barron County, Wisconsin
- Coordinates: 45°25′35″N 91°58′32″W
- Country: United States
- State: Wisconsin
- County: Barron

Area
  - Total: 35.4 sq mi (91.8 km^{2})
  - Land: 35.1 sq mi (91.0 km^{2})
  - Water: 0.31 sq mi (0.8 km^{2})
- Elevation: 1,155 ft (352 m)

Population (2020)
  - Total: 870
  - Density: 25/sq mi (9.6/km^{2})
- Time zone: UTC-6 (Central (CST))
  - Summer (DST): UTC-5 (CDT)
- Area codes: 715 & 534
- FIPS code: 55-15600
- GNIS feature ID: 1582982
- Website: clintonwi.org

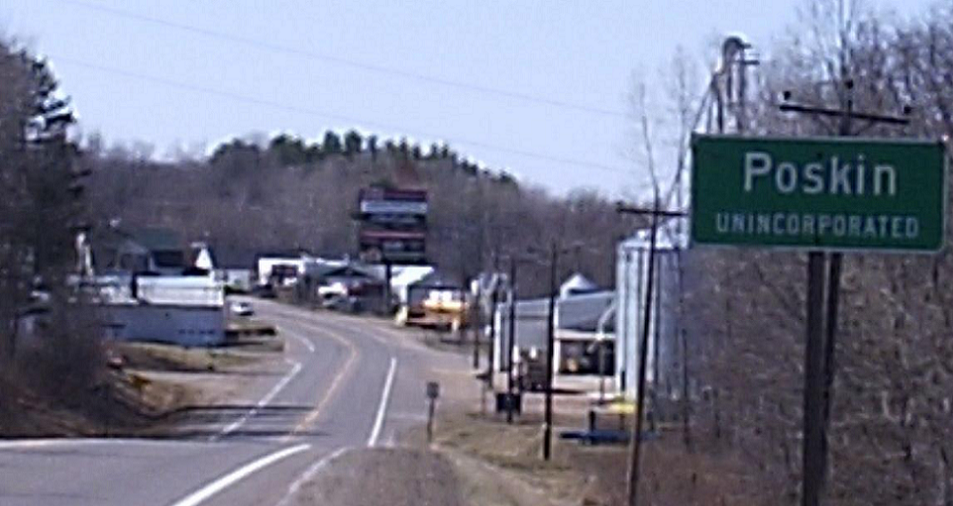
Entering the unincorporated community of Poskin from the east in springtime

Clinton is a town in Barron County, in the U.S. state of Wisconsin. The population was 870 at the 2020 census, down from 879 at the 2010 census. The unincorporated community of Poskin is located in Clinton, along U.S. Route 8.

== Geography ==
Clinton is located west of the center of Barron County. According to the United States Census Bureau, the town has a total area of 35.4 square miles (91.8 km^{2}), of which 35.1 square miles (91.0 km^{2}) is land and 0.31 square miles (0.8 km^{2}), or 0.83%, is water.

== Demographics ==
As of the census of 2000, there were 920 people, 314 households, and 258 families residing in the town. The population density was 26.2 people per square mile (10.1/km^{2}). There were 374 housing units at an average density of 10.6 per square mile (4.1/km^{2}). The racial makeup of the town was 98.59% White, 0.11% African American, 0.54% Native American, 0.43% Asian, 0.22% from other races, and 0.11% from two or more races. Hispanic or Latino people of any race were 0.54% of the population.

There were 314 households, out of which 36.3% had children under the age of 18 living with them, 75.2% were married couples living together, 3.8% had a female householder with no husband present, and 17.8% were non-families. 13.1% of all households were made up of individuals, and 5.1% had someone living alone who was 65 years of age or older. The average household size was 2.93 and the average family size was 3.22.

In the town, the population was spread out, with 30.1% under the age of 18, 9.2% from 18 to 24, 25.1% from 25 to 44, 22.5% from 45 to 64, and 13.0% who were 65 years of age or older. The median age was 35 years. For every 100 females, there were 105.8 males. For every 100 females age 18 and over, there were 101.6 males.

The median income for a household in the town was $39,417, and the median income for a family was $42,105. Males had a median income of $27,014 versus $20,875 for females. The per capita income for the town was $15,584. About 8.7% of families and 10.3% of the population were below the poverty line, including 7.8% of those under age 18 and 9.4% of those age 65 or over.
