= Dallas, Wisconsin =

- Village
- Location of Dallas in Barron County, Wisconsin
- Coordinates: 45°15′7″N 91°51′18″W
- Country: United States
- State: Wisconsin
- County: Barron

Area
  - Total: 1.49 sq mi (3.85 km^{2})
  - Land: 1.45 sq mi (3.75 km^{2})
  - Water: 0.039 sq mi (0.10 km^{2})
- Elevation: 1,168 ft (356 m)

Population (2020)
  - Total: 359
  - Density: 248/sq mi (95.7/km^{2})
- Time zone: UTC-6 (Central (CST))
  - Summer (DST): UTC-5 (CDT)
- Area codes: 715 & 534
- FIPS code: 55-18600
- GNIS feature ID: 1583045
- Website: www.villageofdallas.com

Dallas is a village in Barron County in the U.S. state of Wisconsin. The population was 359 at the 2020 census. The village is located within the Town of Dallas.

== Geography ==
Dallas is located at 45°15′34″N 91°48′58″W (45.259667, −91.816243).

According to the United States Census Bureau, the village has a total area of 1.49 square miles (3.86 km^{2}), of which 1.45 square miles (3.76 km^{2}) is land and 0.04 square miles (0.10 km^{2}) is water.

The Village of Dallas is located along County Roads A and U.

== Demographics ==
Historical population
Census	Pop.	Note	%±
1910	342		—
1920	425		24.3%
1930	428		0.7%
1940	436		1.9%
1950	370		−15.1%
1960	401		8.4%
1970	359		−10.5%
1980	477		32.9%
1990	452		−5.2%
2000	356		−21.2%
2010	409		14.9%
2020	359		−12.2%
U.S. Decennial Census

=== 2010 census ===
As of the census of 2010, there were 409 people, 156 households, and 94 families living in the village. The population density was 282.1 inhabitants per square mile (108.9/km^{2}). There were 173 housing units at an average density of 119.3 per square mile (46.1/km^{2}). The racial makeup of the village was 97.3% White, 0.2% Native American, 1% Asian, 0.7% from other races, and 0.7% from two or more races. Hispanic or Latino people of any race were 2% of the population.

There were 156 households, of which 29.5% had children under the age of 18 living with them, 45.5% were married couples living together, 10.3% had a female householder with no husband present, 4.5% had a male householder with no wife present, and 39.7% were non-families. 30.1% of all households were made up of individuals, and 14.7% had someone living alone who was 65 years of age or older. The average household size was 2.33 and the average family size was 2.85.

The median age in the village was 43.7 years. 19.8% of residents were under the age of 18; 8.6% were between the ages of 18 and 24; 22.7% were from 25 to 44; 23.7% were from 45 to 64; and 25.2% were 65 years of age or older. The gender makeup of the village was 49.9% male and 50.1% female.

=== 2000 census ===
As of the census of 2000, there were 356 people, 146 households, and 83 families living in the village. The population density was 244.8 people per square mile (94.8/km^{2}). There were 169 housing units at an average density of 116.2 per square mile (45.0/km^{2}). The racial makeup of the village was 97.75% White, 1.12% Native American, and 1.12% from two or more races. Hispanic or Latino people of any race were 1.4% of the population.

There were 146 households, out of which 24% had children under the age of 18 living with them, 45.9% were married couples living together, 7.5% had a female householder with no husband present, and 42.5% were non-families. 34.9% of all households were made up of individuals, and 22.6% had someone living alone who was 65 years of age or older. The average household size was 2.23 and the average family size was 2.88.

In the village, the population was spread out, with 20.8% under the age of 18, 5.9% from 18 to 24, 22.8% from 25 to 44, 24.2% from 45 to 64, and 26.4% who were 65 years of age or older. The median age was 46 years. For every 100 females, there were 92.4 males. For every 100 females age 18 and over, there were 91.8 males.

The median income for a household in the village was $30,833, and the median income for a family was $37,750. Males had a median income of $32,500 versus $22,361 for females. The per capita income for the village was $14,665. About 7.9% of families and 11.6% of the population were below the poverty line, including 14.8% of those under age 18 and 22.1% of those age 65 or over.
