= Dobie, Barron County, Wisconsin =

Dobie, Wisconsin
- Unincorporated community
- Location within Wisconsin Location within the United States
- Coordinates: 45°33′07″N 91°41′01″W
- Country: United States
- State: Wisconsin
- County: Barron
- Towns: Oak Grove, Rice Lake
- Elevation: 1,171 ft (357 m)
- Time zone: UTC-6 (Central (CST))
  - Summer (DST): UTC-5 (CDT)
- Area codes: 715 & 534
- GNIS feature ID: 1564013

Dobie is an unincorporated community located in the towns of Oak Grove and Rice Lake, Barron County, Wisconsin, United States.
