= Mikana, Wisconsin =

Unincorporated community in Wisconsin, US

- Unincorporated community
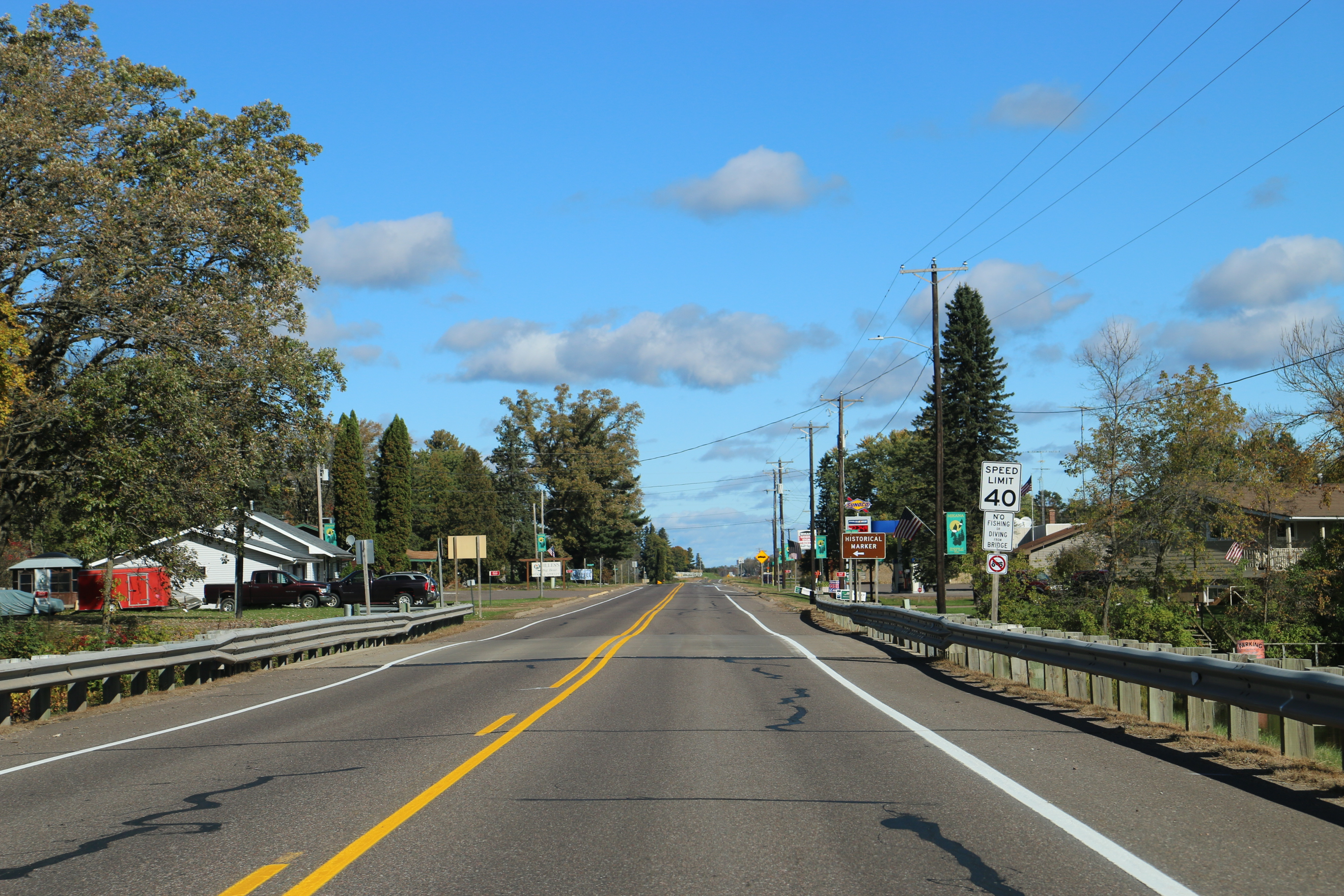
- Downtown Mikana on WIS48

- Location within Wisconsin Location within the United States
- Coordinates: 45°35′31″N 91°36′05″W
- Country: United States
- State: Wisconsin
- County: Barron
- Town: Cedar Lake
- Elevation: 1,194 ft (364 m)
- Time zone: UTC-6 (Central (CST))
  - Summer (DST): UTC-5 (CDT)
- ZIP code: 54857
- Area codes: 715 & 534
- GNIS feature ID: 1569456

Mikana is an unincorporated community in Barron County, Wisconsin, United States. Mikana is situated on the western shore of Red Cedar Lake and is southwest of Birchwood, in the town of Cedar Lake.

== History ==
Mikana was platted in 1902, soon after the railroad was extended to that point. Mikana is an Ojibwe word meaning "road" (or "trail"). Mikana had a post office, which opened on June 3, 1902, and closed on October 21, 1995.

== Attractions ==
Mikana is known in the region for its Fourth of July celebration, in particular its parade which is colloquially referred to as "The Biggest Littlest Fourth of July Parade."

== Images ==
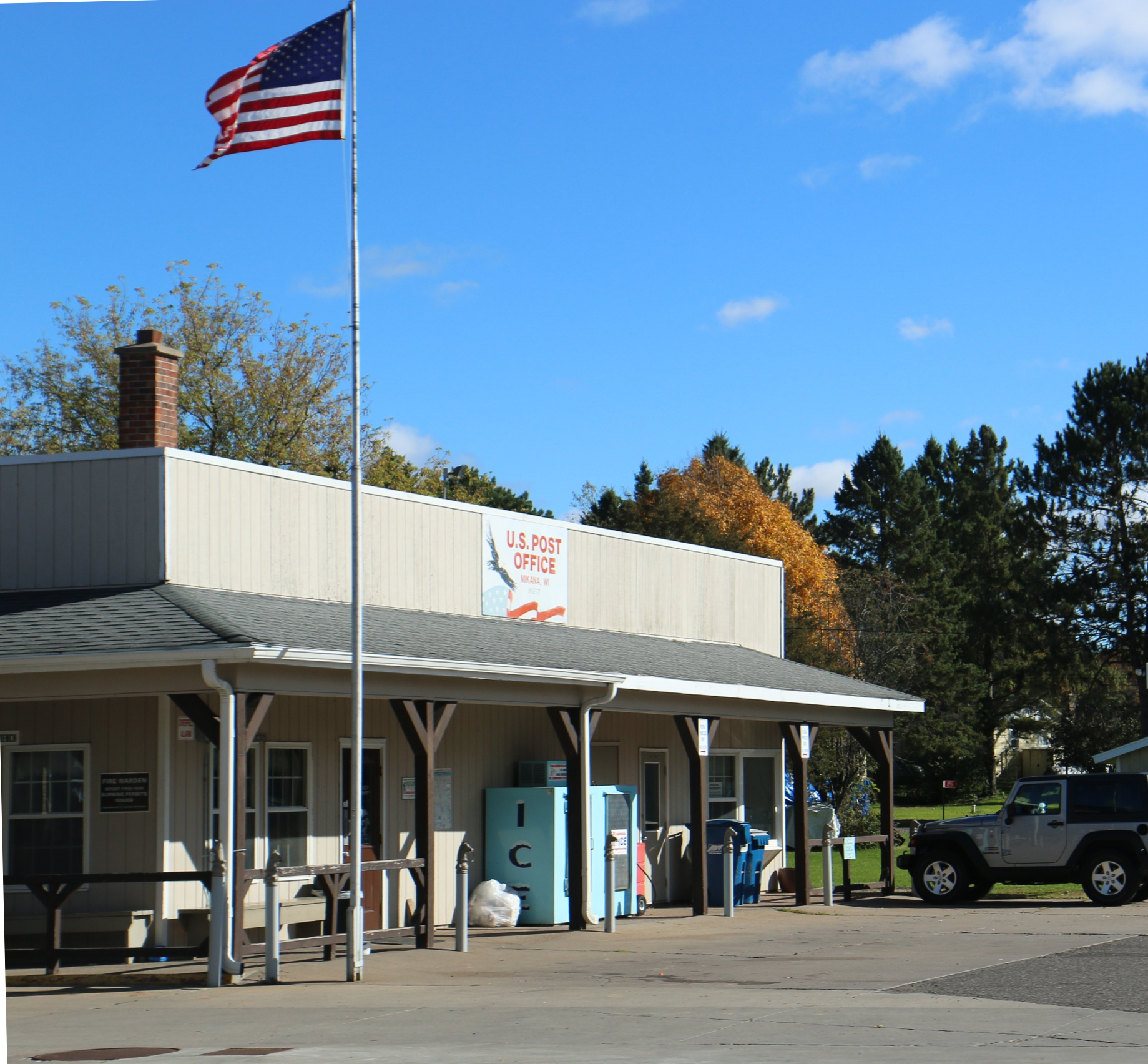
Post office

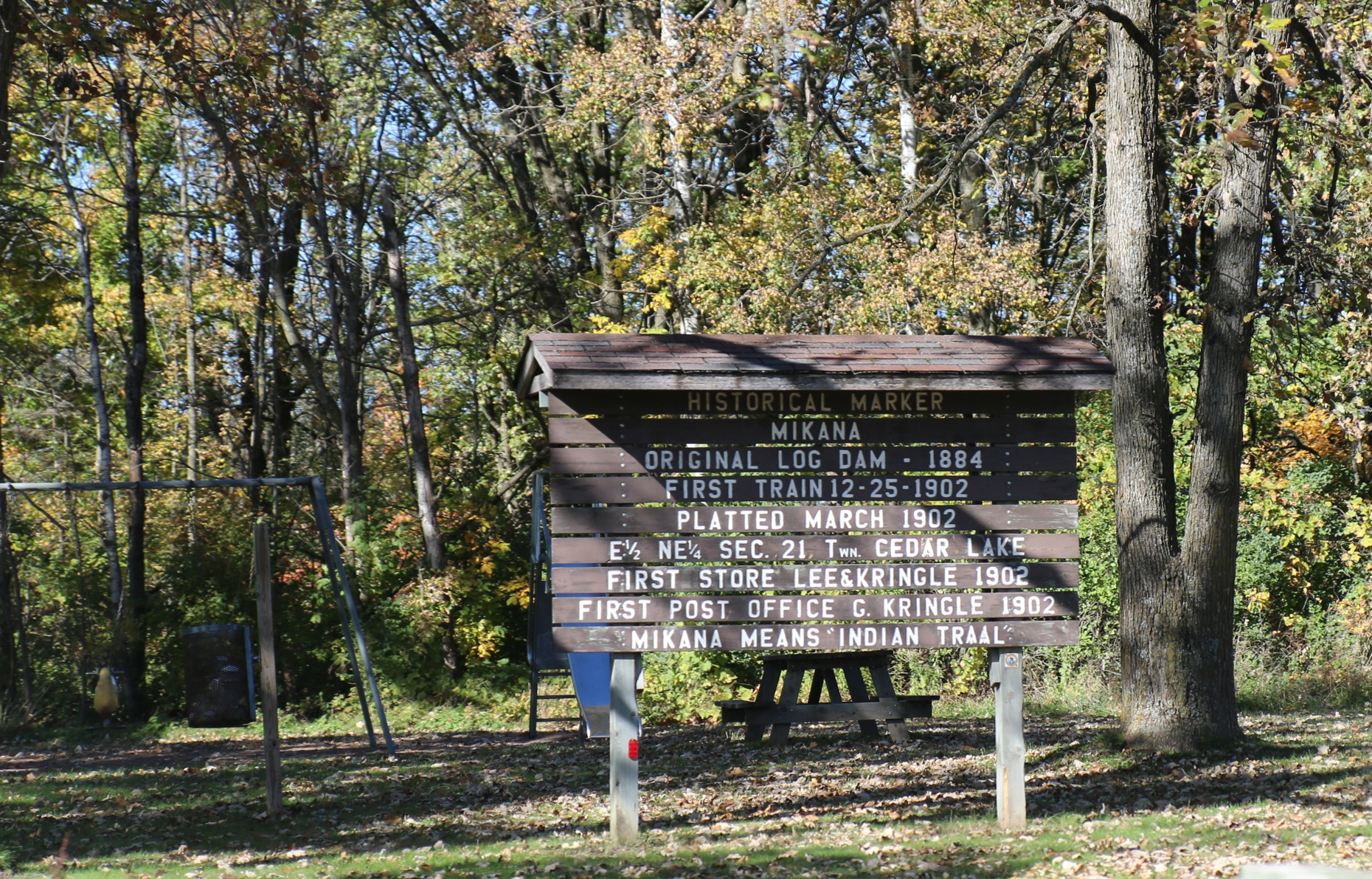
Park

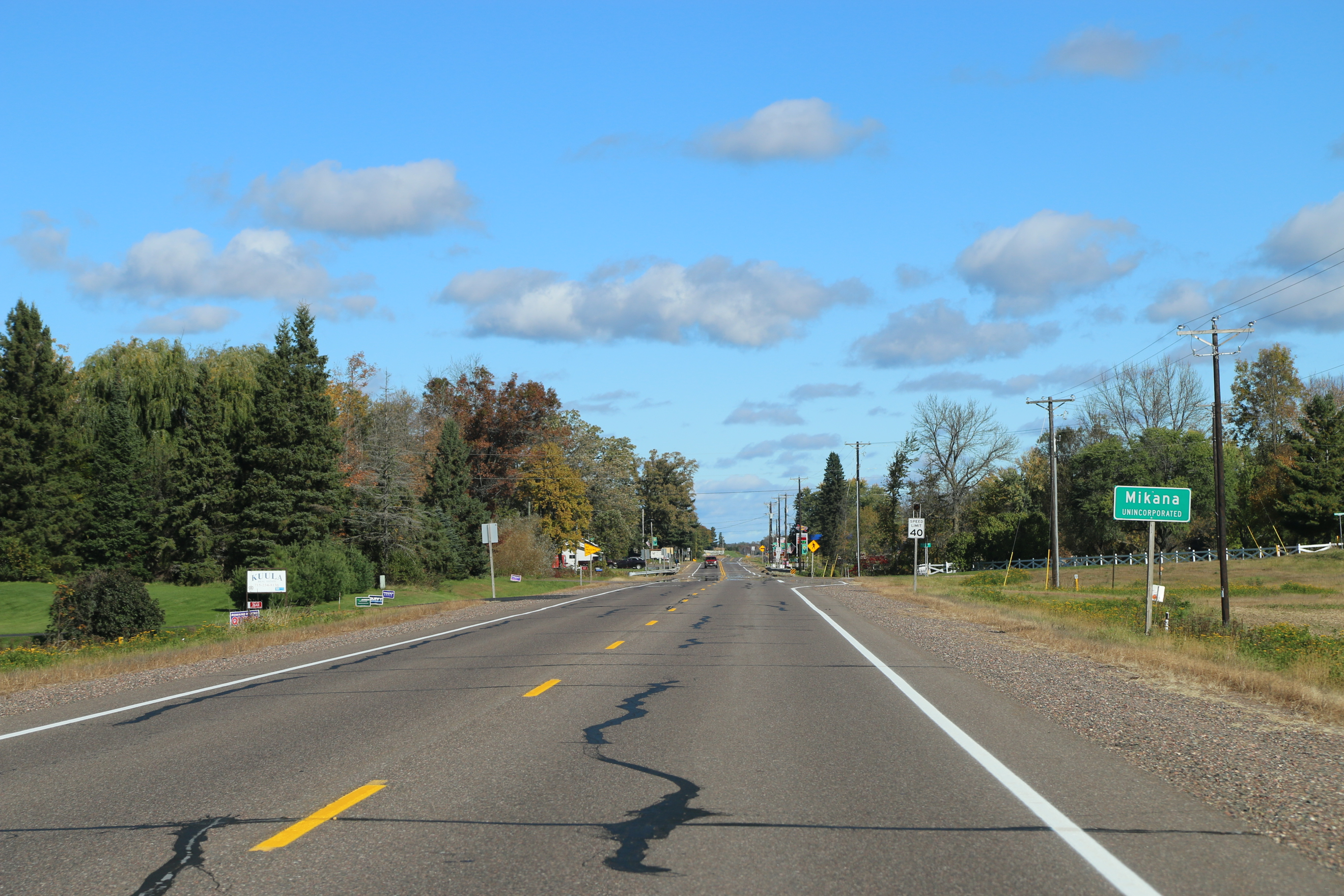
Sign on WIS48
