= Tuscobia, Wisconsin =

- Unincorporated community
- Location within Wisconsin Location within the United States
- Coordinates: 45°34′01″N 91°45′30″W
- Country: United States
- State: Wisconsin
- County: Barron
- Town: Oak Grove
- Elevation: 1,184 ft (361 m)
- Time zone: UTC-6 (Central (CST))
  - Summer (DST): UTC-5 (CDT)
- Area codes: 715 and 534
- GNIS feature ID: 1575748

Tuscobia is an unincorporated community in the town of Oak Grove, Barron County, Wisconsin, United States.

== History ==
A post office called Tuscobia was in operation from 1902 until 1905. The etymology of the name Tuscobia is unclear. It may be derived from a Native American language meaning "level place" but there are several other theories.
