= Stanley, Barron County, Wisconsin =

Stanley, Wisconsin
- Town
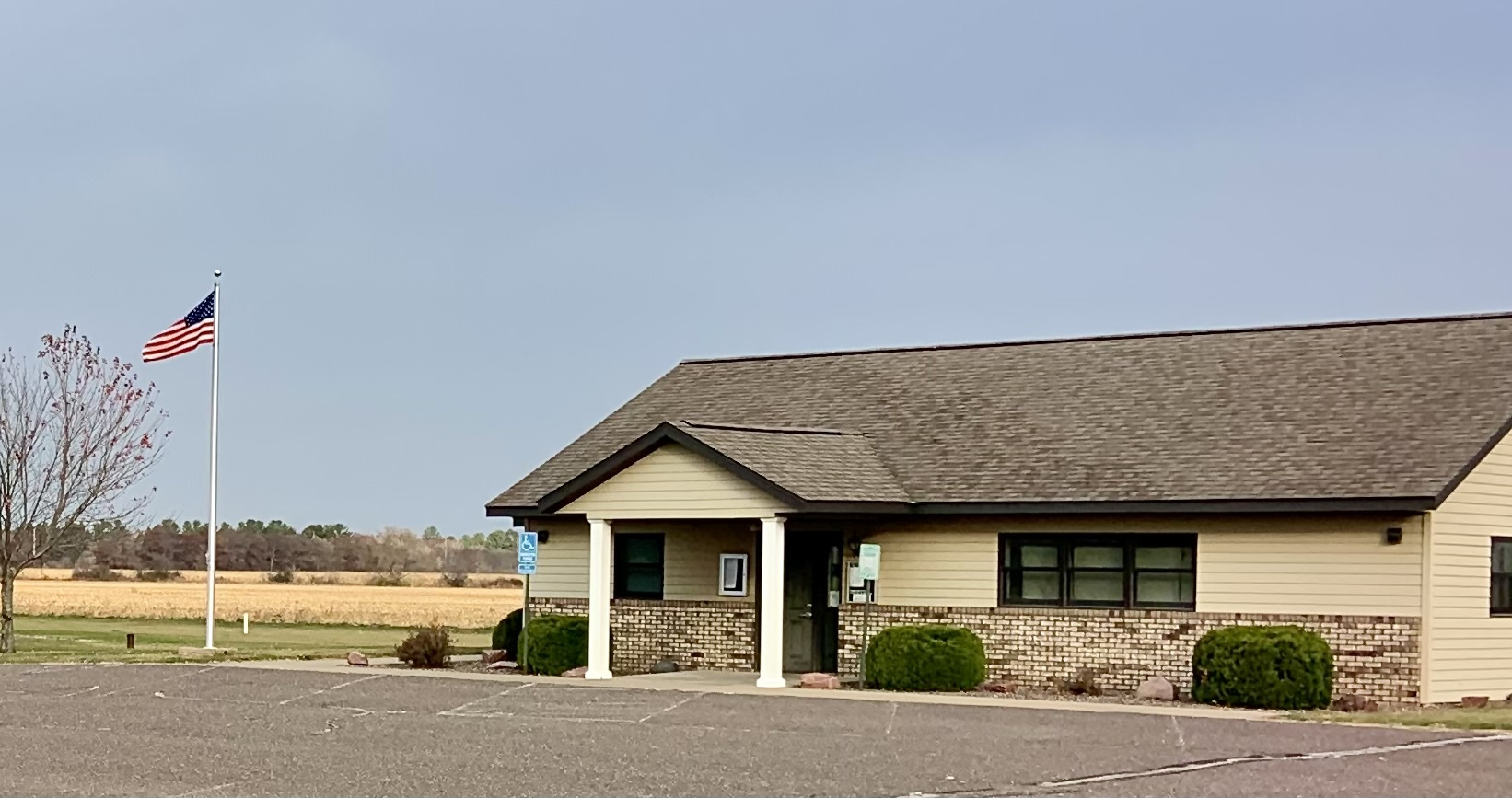
- Town hall

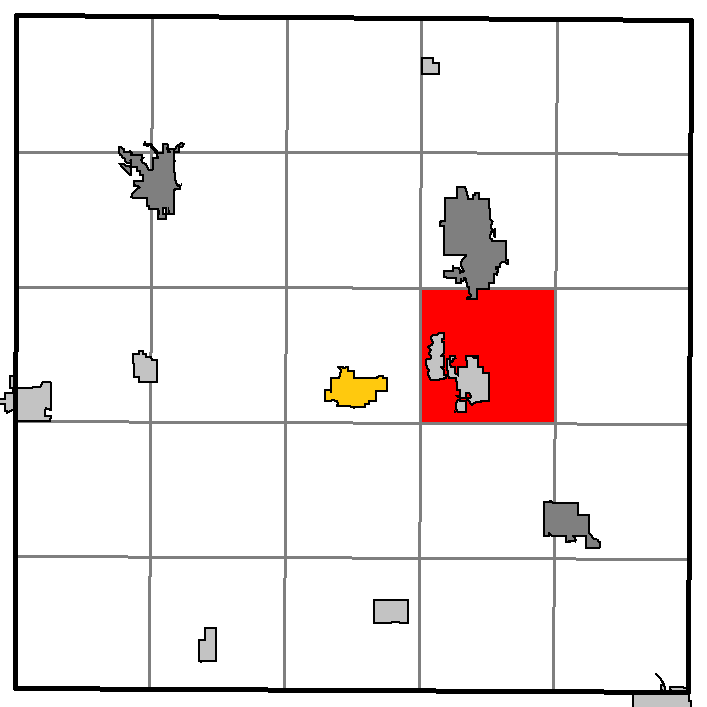
- Location of Stanley, within Barron County, Wisconsin

- Location within Wisconsin
- Coordinates: 45°25′9″N 91°44′6″W
- Country: United States
- State: Wisconsin
- County: Barron

Area
  - Total: 31.7 sq mi (82.1 km^{2})
  - Land: 31.0 sq mi (80.4 km^{2})
  - Water: 0.66 sq mi (1.7 km^{2})
- Elevation: 1,227 ft (374 m)

Population (2020)
  - Total: 2,570
  - Density: 82.8/sq mi (32.0/km^{2})
- Time zone: UTC-6 (Central (CST))
  - Summer (DST): UTC-5 (CDT)
- Area codes: 715 & 534
- FIPS code: 55-76600
- GNIS feature ID: 1584209
- Website: https://townofstanley-wi.gov/

Stanley is a town in Barron County in the U.S. state of Wisconsin. The population was 2,570 at the 2020 census, up from 2,546 at the 2010 census. The town surrounds the village of Cameron but is separate from it.

== Geography ==
Stanley is located east of the center of Barron County. The Red Cedar River flows from north to south across the western side of the town, followed generally by U.S. Route 53, a four-lane expressway. U.S. Route 8 crosses the town from east to west. The village of Cameron, a separate municipality, is southwest of the center of the town and fully surrounded by it.

According to the United States Census Bureau, the town of Stanley has a total area of 31.7 square miles (82.1 km^{2}), of which 31.0 square miles (80.4 km^{2}) is land and 0.66 square miles (1.7 km^{2}), or 2.06%, is water.

== Demographics ==
At the 2000 census, there were 2,229 people, 820 households and 645 families residing in the town. The population density was 71.8 per square mile (27.7/km^{2}). There were 896 housing units at an average density of 28.9 per square mile (11.1/km^{2}). The racial makeup of the town was 98.61% White, 0.04% African American, 0.13% Native American, 0.58% Asian, and 0.63% from two or more races. Hispanic or Latino people of any race were 0.58% of the population.

There were 820 households, of which 37.8% had children under the age of 18 living with them, 67.6% were married couples living together, 6.7% had a female householder with no husband present, and 21.3% were non-families. 16.6% of all households were made up of individuals, and 6.2% had someone living alone who was 65 years of age or older. The average household size was 2.70 and the average family size was 3.02.

27.1% of the population were under the age of 18, 7.5% from 18 to 24, 30.2% from 25 to 44, 25.7% from 45 to 64, and 9.6% who were 65 years of age or older. The median age was 38 years. For every 100 females, there were 103.2 males. For every 100 females age 18 and over, there were 102.4 males.

The median household income was $41,944 and the median family income was $48,182. Males had a median income of $30,243 versus $22,604 for females. The per capita income for the town was $17,598. About 3.0% of families and 7.7% of the population were below the poverty line, including 9.2% of those under age 18 and 14.1% of those age 65 or over.
