= Canton, Barron County, Wisconsin =

Canton, Wisconsin
- Unincorporated community
- Location within Wisconsin Location within the United States
- Coordinates: 45°25′41″N 91°39′36″W
- Country: United States
- State: Wisconsin
- County: Barron
- Town: Sumner
- Elevation: 1,102 ft (336 m)
- Time zone: UTC-6 (Central (CST))
  - Summer (DST): UTC-5 (CDT)
- Area codes: 715 & 534
- GNIS feature ID: 1562707

Canton is an unincorporated community in the town of Sumner, Barron County, Wisconsin, United States. Canton is 5 miles (8 km) east-northeast of Cameron.

Canton was platted in 1884 when the railroad was extended to that point. A post office called Canton was established in 1882, and remained in operation until 1985.
