= Barronett, Barron County, Wisconsin =

Census-designated place in Wisconsin, United States

Barronett, Wisconsin
- Census-designated place
- Location within Wisconsin
- Coordinates: 45°38′13″N 91°59′35″W
- Country: United States
- State: Wisconsin
- County: Barron
- Town: Lakeland

Area
  - Total: 0.771 sq mi (2.00 km^{2})
  - Land: 0.766 sq mi (1.98 km^{2})
  - Water: 0.005 sq mi (0.013 km^{2})
- Elevation: 1,375 ft (419 m)

Population (2020)
  - Total: 103
  - Density: 134/sq mi (51.9/km^{2})
- Time zone: UTC-6 (Central (CST))
  - Summer (DST): UTC-5 (CDT)
- ZIP code: 54813
- Area codes: 715 & 534
- GNIS feature ID: 1561205

Barronett is an unincorporated census-designated place located in the town of Lakeland, Barron County, Wisconsin, United States. Barronett is located on U.S. Route 63, 7.5 miles (12.1 km) north-northeast of Cumberland. Barronett has a post office with ZIP code 54813. As of the 2020 census, its population was 103, a decline from the figure of 111 tabulated in 2010.

== History ==
Barronett was originally called Foster City, and under the latter name was platted in 1880. The name of the community was soon changed to Barronett, after Barron County. A post office called Barronett has been in operation since 1881.
