= Comstock, Wisconsin =

- Unincorporated community
- Location within Wisconsin Location within the United States
- Coordinates: 45°28′40″N 92°04′31″W
- Country: United States
- State: Wisconsin
- County: Barron
- Town: Crystal Lake
- Elevation: 1,286 ft (392 m)
- Time zone: UTC-6 (Central (CST))
  - Summer (DST): UTC-5 (CDT)
- ZIP code: 54826
- Area codes: 715 & 534
- GNIS feature ID: 1563304

Comstock is an unincorporated community located in Barron County, Wisconsin, United States. Comstock is located on U.S. Route 63 southwest of Cumberland, in the town of Crystal Lake. Comstock has the ZIP code 54826, but no longer has a post office of its own.

== History ==
A post office called Comstock has been in operation since 1881. The community was named for H. S. Comstock, a Wisconsin judge.
