= Angus, Wisconsin =

- Unincorporated community
- Location within Wisconsin Location within the United States
- Coordinates: 45°38′11″N 91°36′09″W
- Country: United States
- State: Wisconsin
- County: Barron
- Town: Cedar Lake
- Elevation: 1,247 ft (380 m)
- Time zone: UTC-6 (Central (CST))
  - Summer (DST): UTC-5 (CDT)
- Area codes: 715 & 534
- GNIS feature ID: 1560874

Angus is an unincorporated community in the town of Cedar Lake, Barron County, Wisconsin, United States. Angus is located on Wisconsin Highway 48, 2.5 miles (4.0 km) southwest of Birchwood.

== History ==
Angus was laid out in 1906. A post office called Angus was established in 1906, and remained in operation until it was discontinued in 1942. The community was named for Angus Cameron, a United States Senator from Wisconsin.
