= Rice Lake (town), Wisconsin =

Town in Barron County, Wisconsin

Rice Lake, Wisconsin
- Town
- Town of Rice Lake
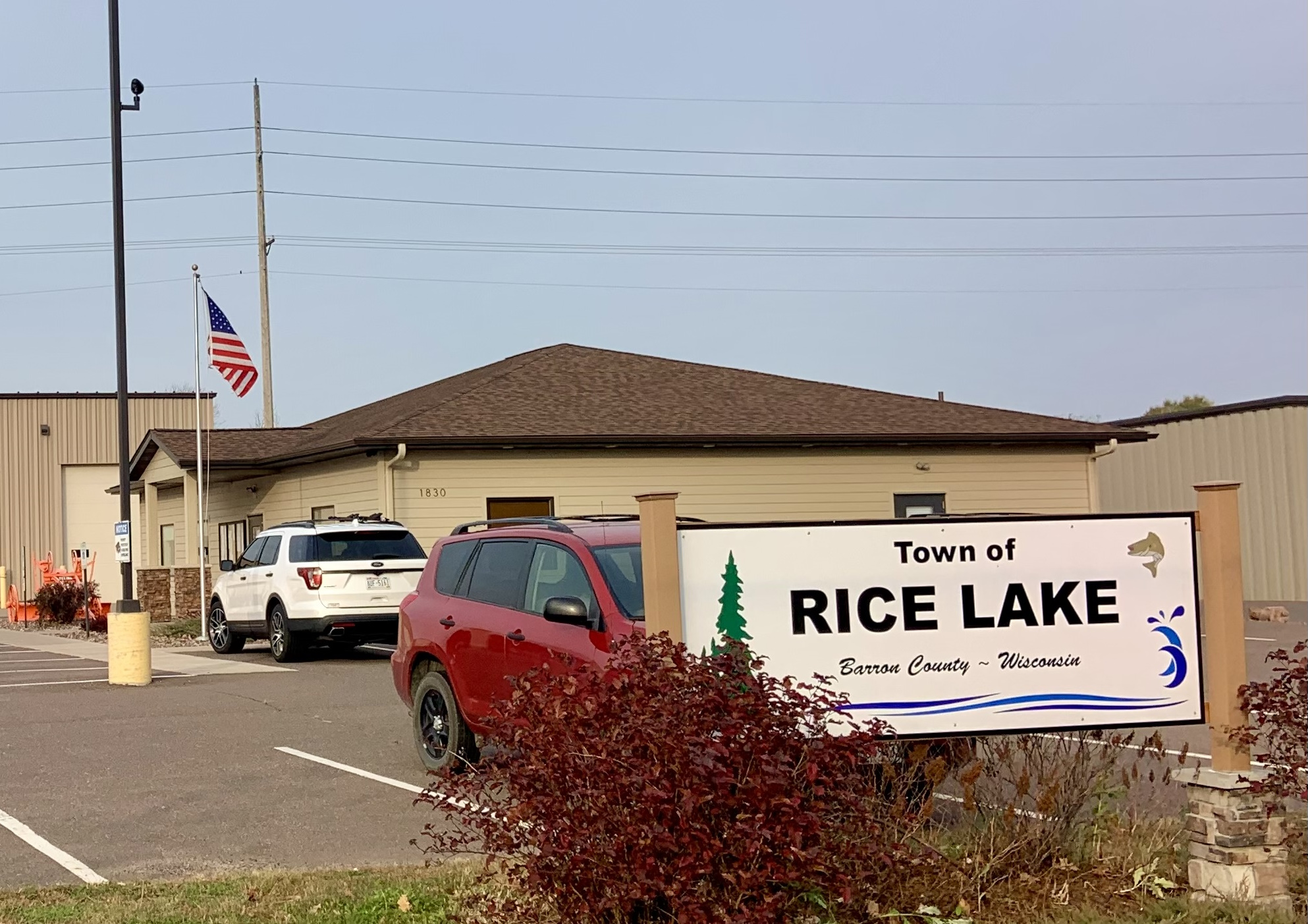
- Rice Lake Town Hall

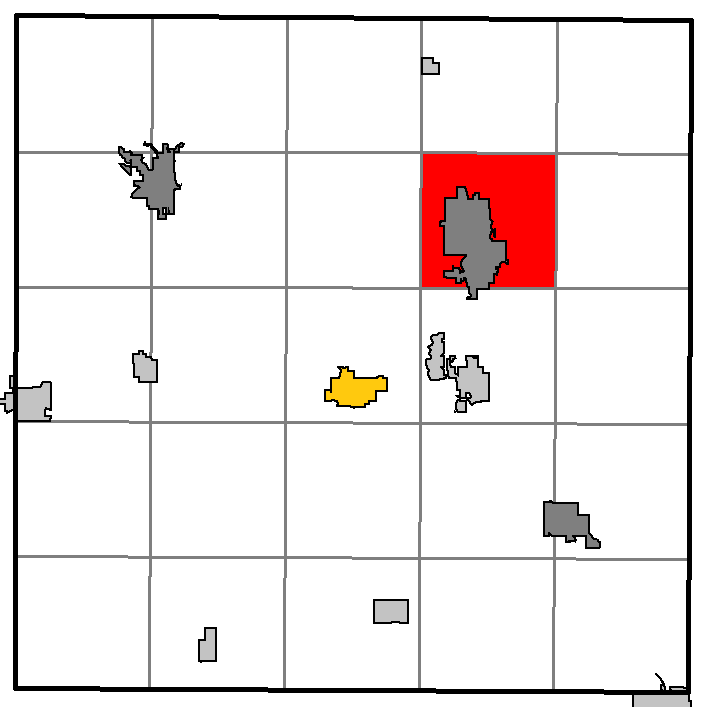
- Location of Rice Lake, within Barron County, Wisconsin

- Location of Barron County, Wisconsin
- Coordinates: 45°30′43″N 91°43′06″W
- Country: United States
- State: Wisconsin
- County: Barron

Area
  - Total: 27.20 sq mi (70.4 km^{2})
  - Land: 26.04 sq mi (67.4 km^{2})
  - Water: 1.16 sq mi (3.0 km^{2})

Population (2020)
  - Total: 2,813
  - Density: 108.0/sq mi (41.71/km^{2})
- Time zone: UTC-6 (Central (CST))
  - Summer (DST): UTC-5 (CDT)
- ZIP Code: 54868
- Area code(s): 715 & 534
- GNIS feature ID: 1584020
- Website: townofricelake.com

Rice Lake is a town in Barron County in the U.S. state of Wisconsin. The population was 2,813 at the 2020 census, down from 3,041 at the 2010 census. The City of Rice Lake is mostly surrounded by the town. The unincorporated communities of Campia and Dobie are located partially in the town.

== Geography ==
The town of Rice Lake is located northeast of the center of Barron County and surrounds the city of Rice Lake on the west, north, and east. The waterbody of Rice Lake is located primarily in the city but extends north into the town. A few small arms of the lake at its south end also extend east into the town. The Red Cedar River enters the town near its northeast corner, flows southwest into Rice Lake (the lake and the city), then continues southward from the lake, forming a boundary between the city and the town.

U.S. Route 53, a four-lane expressway, runs north-south through the town to the west of the city of Rice Lake, with access from Exits 140 and 143. Wisconsin Highway 48 crosses US-53 at Exit 143 and passes through the town both east and west of Rice Lake city.

According to the United States Census Bureau, the town has a total area of 27.5 square miles (71.2 km^{2}), of which 26.3 square miles (68.2 km^{2}) is land and 1.2 square miles (3.0 km^{2}), or 4.21%, is water.

== Demographics ==
As of the census of 2000, there were 3,026 people, 1,139 households, and 877 families residing in the town. The population density was 114.7 people per square mile (44.3/km^{2}). There were 1,216 housing units at an average density of 46.1 per square mile (17.8/km^{2}). The racial makeup of the town was 98.25% White, 0.17% Black or African American, 0.23% Native American, 0.26% Asian, 0.03% Pacific Islander, 0.40% from other races, and 0.66% from two or more races. Hispanic or Latino people of any race were 0.96% of the population.

There were 1,139 households, out of which 36.4% had children under the age of 18 living with them, 67.3% were married couples living together, 6.7% had a female householder with no husband present, and 23.0% were non-families. 19.4% of all households were made up of individuals, and 7.6% had someone living alone who was 65 years of age or older. The average household size was 2.66 and the average family size was 3.04.

In the town, the population was spread out, with 27.0% under the age of 18, 7.7% from 18 to 24, 28.7% from 25 to 44, 24.5% from 45 to 64, and 12.1% who were 65 years of age or older. The median age was 37 years. For every 100 females, there were 98.7 males. For every 100 females age 18 and over, there were 101.5 males.

The median income for a household in the town was $45,649, and the median income for a family was $49,865. Males had a median income of $34,340 versus $20,992 for females. The per capita income for the town was $19,835. About 2.8% of families and 3.8% of the population were below the poverty line, including 3.0% of those under age 18 and 9.8% of those age 65 or over.

== Notable people ==
- George Mireau, farmer and politician
