= Reeve, Wisconsin =

- Unincorporated community
- Location within Wisconsin Location within the United States
- Coordinates: 45°14′19″N 92°07′34″W
- Country: United States
- State: Wisconsin
- County: Barron
- Town: Vance Creek
- Elevation: 1,155 ft (352 m)
- Time zone: UTC-6 (Central (CST))
  - Summer (DST): UTC-5 (CDT)
- Area codes: 715 and 534
- GNIS feature ID: 1572181

Reeve is an unincorporated community located in the town of Vance Creek, Barron County, Wisconsin, United States.

A post office called Reeve was established in 1898, and remained in operation until 1913. Besides the post office, Reeve had two country stores.
