= Arland, Wisconsin =

- Town
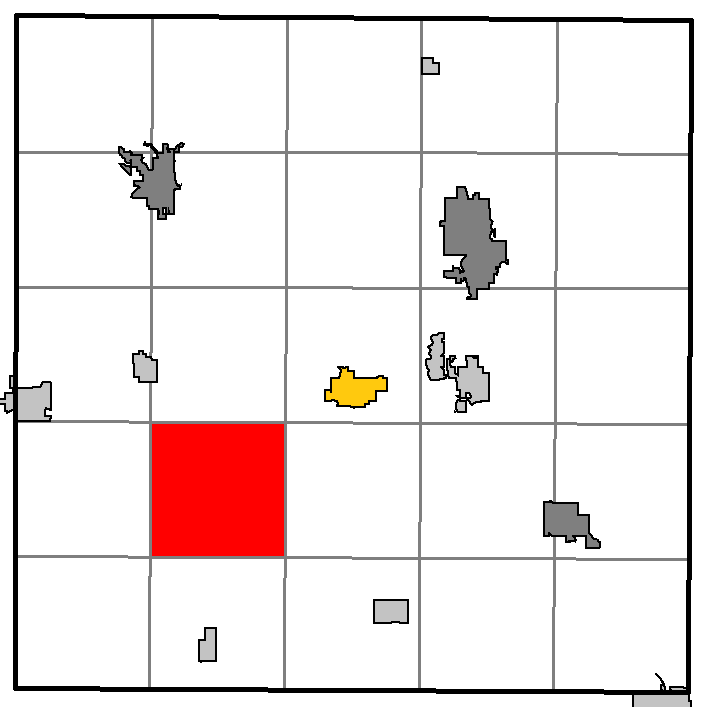
- Location of Arland, within Barron County, Wisconsin

- Location of Barron County, Wisconsin
- Coordinates: 45°19′57″N 91°58′6″W
- Country: United States
- State: Wisconsin
- County: Barron

Area
  - Total: 35.3 sq mi (91.5 km^{2})
  - Land: 35.3 sq mi (91.5 km^{2})
  - Water: 0 sq mi (0 km^{2})
- Elevation: 1,152 ft (351 m)

Population (2020)
  - Total: 712
  - Density: 20.2/sq mi (7.78/km^{2})
- Time zone: UTC-6 (Central (CST))
  - Summer (DST): UTC-5 (CDT)
- Area codes: 715 & 534
- FIPS code: 55-02775
- GNIS feature ID: 1582712
- Website: www.townofarland.com

Arland is a town in Barron County in the U.S. state of Wisconsin. The population was 712 at the 2020 census, down from 789 at the 2010 census. The unincorporated community of Twin Town is located partially in the town.

== Geography ==
Arland is located in southwestern Barron County. The Hay River, a tributary of the Red Cedar River, flows south through the town.

According to the United States Census Bureau, the town has a total area of 35.3 square miles (91.5 km^{2}), all land.

== Demographics ==
As of the census of 2000, there were 670 people, 233 households, and 185 families residing in the town. The population density was 19 people per square mile (7.3/km^{2}). There were 259 housing units at an average density of 7.3 per square mile (2.8/km^{2}). The racial makeup of the town was 99.1% White, 0.3% Native American, 0.3% Asian, and 0.3% from two or more races.

There were 233 households, out of which 39.5% had children under the age of 18 living with them, 65.2% were married couples living together, 8.6% had a female householder with no husband present, and 20.2% were non-families. 17.6% of all households were made up of individuals, and 9.4% had someone living alone who was 65 years of age or older. The average household size was 2.82 and the average family size was 3.18.

In the town, the population was spread out, with 29.7% under the age of 18, 8.2% from 18 to 24, 27.5% from 25 to 44, 22.1% from 45 to 64, and 12.5% who were 65 years of age or older. The median age was 33 years. For every 100 females, there were 93.6 males. For every 100 females age 18 and over, there were 99.6 males.

The median income for a household in the town was $31,985, and the median income for a family was $33,750. Males had a median income of $26,176 versus $20,625 for females. The per capita income for the town was $13,555. About 8.2% of families and 12.2% of the population were below the poverty line, including 16.4% of those under age 18 and 20.8% of those age 65 or over.
