= Dallas (town), Wisconsin =

Town in Barron County, Wisconsin, US

Dallas, Wisconsin
- Town
- Town of Dallas
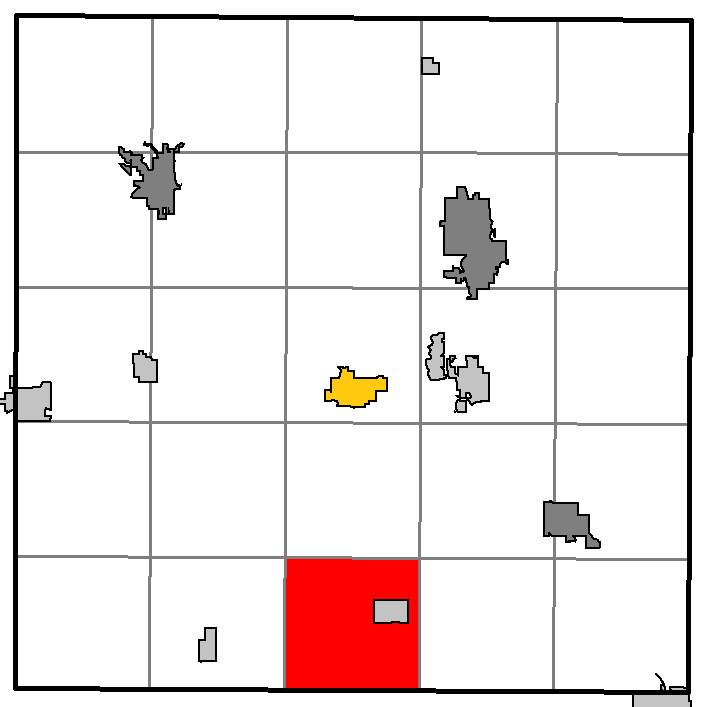
- Location of Dallas, within Barron County, Wisconsin

- Location of Barron County, Wisconsin
- Coordinates: 45°15′05″N 91°51′24″W
- Country: United States
- State: Wisconsin
- County: Barron County

Area
  - Total: 33.91 sq mi (87.8 km^{2})
  - Land: 33.9 sq mi (88 km^{2})
  - Water: 0.01 sq mi (0.026 km^{2})

Population (2020)
  - Total: 570
  - Density: 17/sq mi (6.5/km^{2})
- Time zone: UTC-6 (Central (CST))
  - Summer (DST): UTC-5 (CDT)
- ZIP Code: 54733
- Area code(s): 715 & 534
- GNIS feature ID: 1583046

Dallas is a town in Barron County in the U.S. state of Wisconsin. As of the 2020 census, the population was 570, up from the 2010 census, in which the town had a population of 565. The Village of Dallas is within the town.

== Geography ==
Dallas is located along the southern border of Barron County, with Dunn County to the south. The village of Dallas, northeast of the geographic center of the town, is surrounded by the town of Dallas but is separate from it.

According to the United States Census Bureau, the town has a total area of 33.78 square miles (87.48 km^{2}), of which 33.77 square miles (87.46 km^{2}) is land and 0.008 square miles (0.02 km^{2}), or 0.02%, is water.

The town of Dallas is located along Wisconsin Highway 25.

== Demographics ==
As of the census of 2000, there were 604 people, 217 households, and 174 families residing in the town. The population density was 17.8 people per square mile (6.9/km^{2}). There were 235 housing units at an average density of 6.9 per square mile (2.7/km^{2}). The racial makeup of the town was 99.83% White and 0.17% Asian. Hispanic or Latino people of any race were 1.16% of the population.

There were 217 households, out of which 34.6% had children under the age of 18 living with them, 70.5% were married couples living together, 5.1% had a female householder with no husband present, and 19.4% were non-families. 14.3% of all households were made up of individuals, and 2.8% had someone living alone who was 65 years of age or older. The average household size was 2.78 and the average family size was 3.13.

In the town, the population was spread out, with 26.7% under the age of 18, 8.4% from 18 to 24, 28.8% from 25 to 44, 23.8% from 45 to 64, and 12.3% who were 65 years of age or older. The median age was 36 years. For every 100 females, there were 108.3 males. For every 100 females age 18 and over, there were 108 males.

The median income for a household in the town was $40,521, and the median income for a family was $43,125. Males had a median income of $32,222 versus $20,556 for females. The per capita income for the town was $21,069. Approximately 1.9% of families and 2.9% of the population were below the poverty line, including 3.2% of those under age 18 and 4% of those age 65 or over.
