= Brill, Wisconsin =

- Unincorporated community
- Location within Wisconsin Location within the United States
- Coordinates: 45°36′10″N 91°40′20″W
- Country: United States
- State: Wisconsin
- County: Barron
- Town: Oak Grove
- Elevation: 1,197 ft (365 m)
- Time zone: UTC-6 (Central (CST))
  - Summer (DST): UTC-5 (CDT)
- ZIP code: 54818
- Area codes: 715 & 534
- GNIS feature ID: 1562209

Brill is an unincorporated community located in Barron County, Wisconsin, United States. Brill is east of Haugen, in the town of Oak Grove.

== History ==
Brill was platted in 1902. The community was named for Hascal R. Brill, a Minnesota judge. A post office called Brill was established in 1902, and remained in operation until it was discontinued in 1993.
