= Red Cedar Lake (Wisconsin) =

Lake in the state of Wisconsin, United States

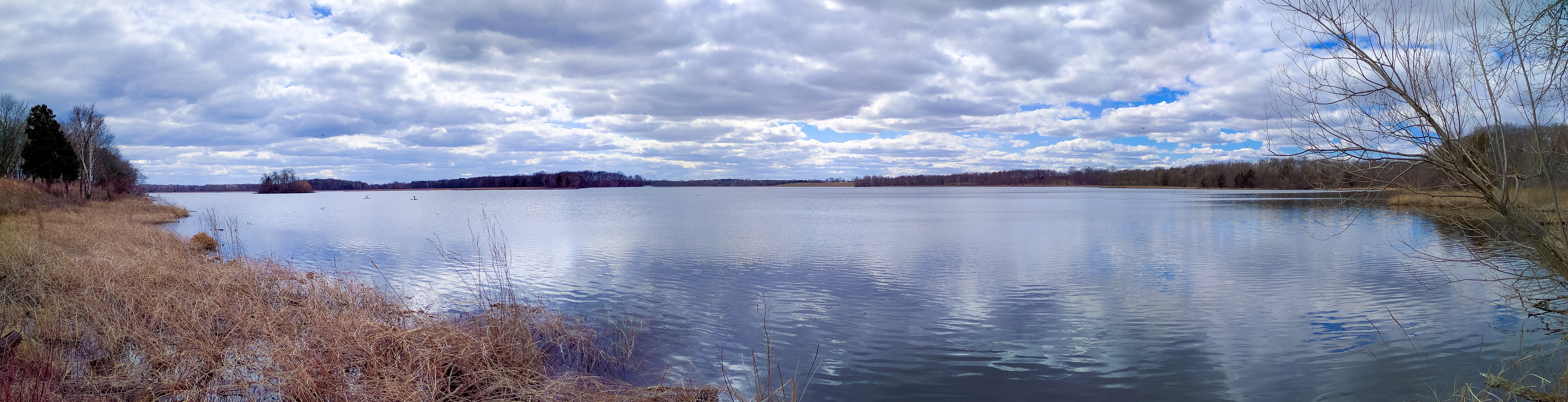

- Location within Wisconsin Location within the United States
- Location: Barron and Washburn counties, Wisconsin
- Coordinates: 45.6023068°N 91.5828774°W
- Type: Drainage lake
- Basin countries: United States
- Surface area: 1,841 acres (7.45 km^{2})
- Max. depth: 53 ft (16 m)
- Surface elevation: 1,184 ft (361 m)
- Settlements: Mikana

Red Cedar Lake is a lake in Barron and Washburn counties, Wisconsin, United States. The lake covers an area of 1,841 acres (7.45 km^{2}) and reaches a maximum depth of 53 ft (16 m). The community of Mikana, Wisconsin, is located on the lake's western shore. Fish species enzootic to Red Cedar Lake include bluegill, largemouth bass, northern pike, smallmouth bass, and walleye.
