= Campia, Wisconsin =

- Unincorporated community
- Location within Wisconsin Location within the United States
- Coordinates: 45°32′15″N 91°39′57″W
- Country: United States
- State: Wisconsin
- County: Barron
- Towns: Rice Lake, Doyle
- Elevation: 1,171 ft (357 m)
- Time zone: UTC-6 (Central (CST))
  - Summer (DST): UTC-5 (CDT)
- Area codes: 715 & 534
- GNIS feature ID: 1562695

Campia is an unincorporated community in the towns of Rice Lake and Doyle, Barron County, Wisconsin, United States. Campia is located on Wisconsin Highway 48, 4 miles (6.4 km) east-northeast of the city of Rice Lake.

Campia was platted in 1904, soon after the railroad was extended to that point. The Campia post office closed in 1934.
