= Turtle Lake (town), Wisconsin =

Civil town in Barron County, Wisconsin

Turtle Lake, Wisconsin
- Town
- Town of Turtle Lake
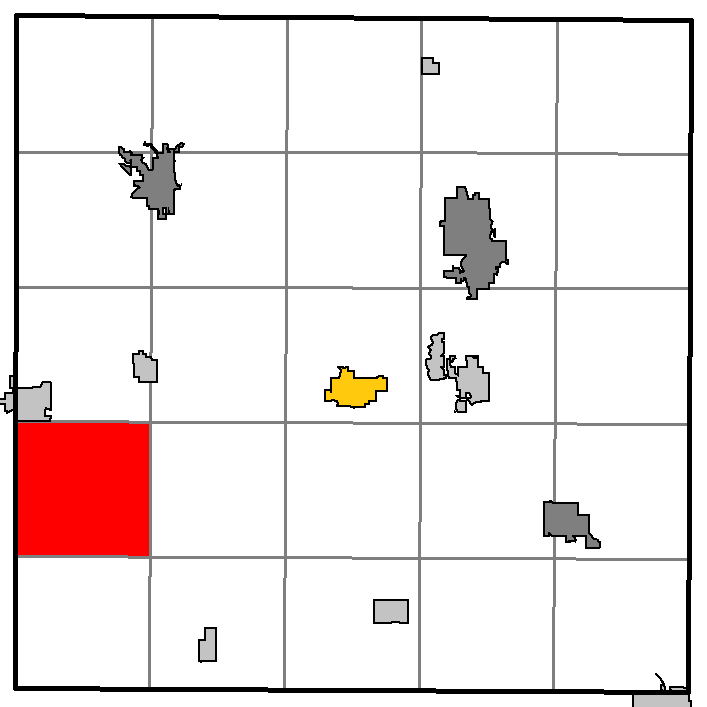
- Location of Turtle Lake, within Barron County, Wisconsin

- Location of Barron County, Wisconsin
- Coordinates: 45°19′52″N 92°06′16″W
- Country: United States
- State: Wisconsin
- County: Barron

Area
  - Total: 35.61 sq mi (92.2 km^{2})
  - Land: 35.18 sq mi (91.1 km^{2})
  - Water: 0.43 sq mi (1.1 km^{2})

Population (2020)
  - Total: 640
  - Density: 18/sq mi (7.0/km^{2})
- Time zone: UTC-6 (Central (CST))
  - Summer (DST): UTC-5 (CDT)
- ZIP Code: 54889
- Area code(s): 715 & 534
- GNIS feature ID: 1584303

Turtle Lake is a town in Barron County, Wisconsin, United States. The population was 640 at the 2020 census, up from 624 at the 2010 census. The Village of Turtle Lake is located just north of the town. The unincorporated community of Twin Town is also located partially in the town.

== Geography ==
Turtle Lake is located in southwestern Barron County, with its western border following the Polk County line. According to the United States Census Bureau, the town has a total area of 35.6 square miles (92.2 km^{2}), of which 35.2 square miles (91.1 km^{2}) is land and 0.42 square miles (1.1 km^{2}), or 1.22%, is water.

== Demographics ==
As of the census of 2000, there were 622 people, 224 households, and 168 families residing in the town. The population density was 17.7 people per square mile (6.8/km^{2}). There were 283 housing units at an average density of 8.0 per square mile (3.1/km^{2}). The racial makeup of the town was 98.23% White, 1.13% Native American, 0.32% Asian, 0.16% Pacific Islander, and 0.16% from two or more races. Hispanic or Latino people of any race were 0.16% of the population.

There were 224 households, out of which 37.5% had children under the age of 18 living with them, 67.4% were married couples living together, 5.8% had a female householder with no husband present, and 24.6% were non-families. 21.9% of all households were made up of individuals, and 6.7% had someone living alone who was 65 years of age or older. The average household size was 2.78 and the average family size was 3.27.

In the town, the population was spread out, with 30.2% under the age of 18, 6.9% from 18 to 24, 28.1% from 25 to 44, 25.6% from 45 to 64, and 9.2% who were 65 years of age or older. The median age was 36 years. For every 100 females, there were 110.1 males. For every 100 females age 18 and over, there were 114.9 males.

The median income for a household in the town was $44,375, and the median income for a family was $47,578. Males had a median income of $26,333 versus $19,688 for females. The per capita income for the town was $17,151. About 4.8% of families and 9.4% of the population were below the poverty line, including 19.0% of those under age 18 and 3.3% of those age 65 or over.
