= Poskin, Wisconsin =

Unincorporated community in Barron County, Wisconsin

- Unincorporated community
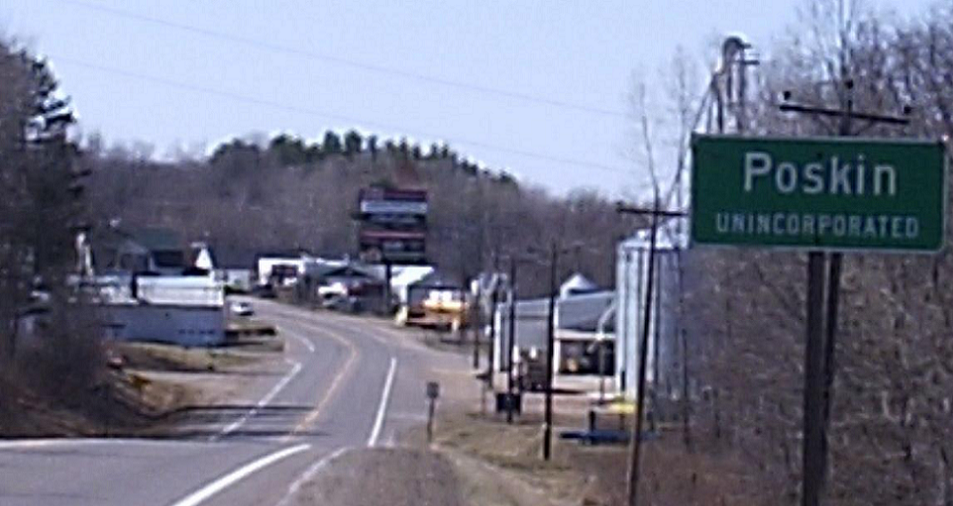

- Location within Wisconsin Location within the United States
- Coordinates: 45°24′33″N 91°57′42″W
- Country: United States
- State: Wisconsin
- County: Barron
- Town: Clinton
- Elevation: 1,194 ft (364 m)
- Time zone: UTC-6 (Central (CST))
  - Summer (DST): UTC-5 (CDT)
- Area codes: 715 & 534
- GNIS feature ID: 1571817

Poskin (also Cosgrove, Poskin Lake) is an unincorporated community in the town of Clinton, Barron County, Wisconsin, United States. Poskin is located on U.S. Route 8, 5.5 miles (8.9 km) west of Barron.

== History ==
Poskin was platted in 1887, and named for Mary Poskin, the wife of a businessperson in the lumber industry. Poskin had a post office, which opened on March 30, 1887, and closed on July 10, 1993.
