= Bear Lake, Wisconsin =

- Town
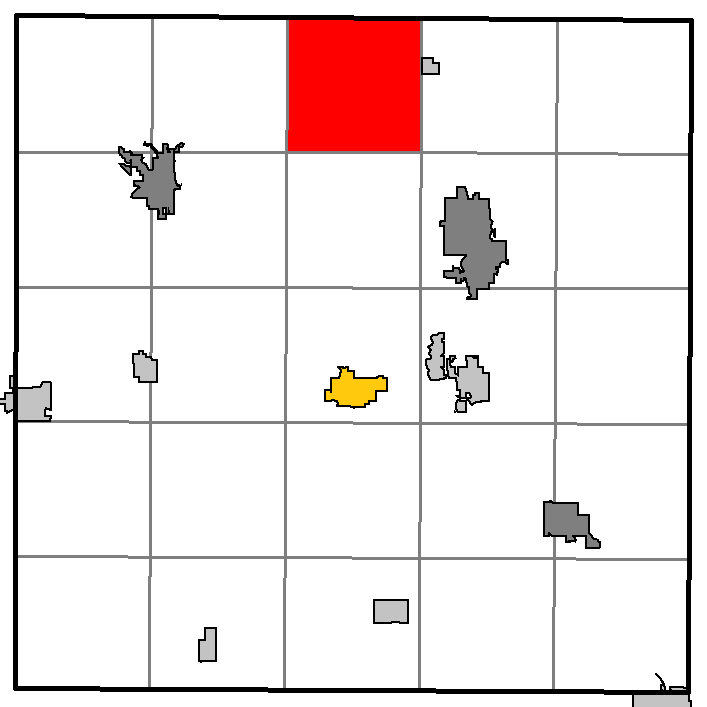
- Location of Bear Lake, within Barron County, Wisconsin

- Location of Barron County, Wisconsin
- Coordinates: 45°35′37″N 91°49′35″W
- Country: United States
- State: Wisconsin
- County: Barron

Area
  - Total: 35 sq mi (91 km^{2})
  - Land: 33 sq mi (85 km^{2})
  - Water: 2.3 sq mi (6 km^{2})
- Elevation: 1,207 ft (368 m)

Population (2020)
  - Total: 670
  - Density: 20/sq mi (7.9/km^{2})
- Time zone: UTC-6 (Central (CST))
  - Summer (DST): UTC-5 (CDT)
- Area codes: 715 & 534
- FIPS code: 55-05650
- GNIS feature ID: 1582772
- Website: townofbearlake.com

Bear Lake is a town in Barron County in the U.S. state of Wisconsin. The population was 670 at the 2020 census, up from 659 at the 2010 census.

== Geography ==
The town of Bear Lake is located along the northern border of Barron County. The town's namesake lake lies in the northern portion of the town, extending north into Washburn County.

According to the United States Census Bureau, the town has a total area of 35 square miles (91 km^{2}), of which 33 square miles (85 km^{2}) is land and 2.3 square miles (6 km^{2}), or 6.64%, is water.

== Demographics ==
As of the census of 2000, there were 587 people, 219 households, and 176 families residing in the town. The population density was 17.9 people per square mile (6.9/km^{2}). There were 258 housing units at an average density of 7.8 per square mile (3/km^{2}). The racial makeup of the town was 99.32% White, 0.51% Asian, 0.17% from other races. Hispanic or Latino people of any race were 0.68% of the population.

There were 219 households, out of which 32.4% had children under the age of 18 living with them, 70.3% were married couples living together, 3.7% had a female householder with no husband present, and 19.6% were non-families. 14.2% of all households were made up of individuals, and 6.4% had someone living alone who was 65 years of age or older. The average household size was 2.68 and the average family size was 2.93.

In the town, the population was spread out, with 24.4% under the age of 18, 6.1% from 18 to 24, 30.2% from 25 to 44, 24.9% from 45 to 64, and 14.5% who were 65 years of age or older. The median age was 40 years. For every 100 females, there were 99 males. For every 100 females age 18 and over, there were 108.5 males.

The median income for a household in the town was $44,271, and the median income for a family was $46,786. Males had a median income of $33,750 versus $21,000 for females. The per capita income for the town was $18,380. About 4% of families and 5.1% of the population were below the poverty line, including 5.6% of those under age 18 and 10.3% of those age 65 or over.
