= Graytown, Wisconsin =

- Unincorporated community
- Location within Wisconsin Location within the United States
- Coordinates: 45°11′58″N 92°07′38″W
- Country: United States
- State: Wisconsin
- Counties: Barron, Dunn
- Towns: Vance Creek, New Haven
- Elevation: 1,063 ft (324 m)
- Time zone: UTC-6 (Central (CST))
  - Summer (DST): UTC-5 (CDT)
- Area codes: 715 and 534
- GNIS feature ID: 1565791

Graytown is an unincorporated community located in the towns of New Haven in Dunn County and Vance Creek in Barron County, Wisconsin, United States. The community was named for Aaron B. Gray, a New Yorker who had opened a hotel in the mid-1870s.
