= Doyle, Wisconsin =

Town of Doyle
- Town
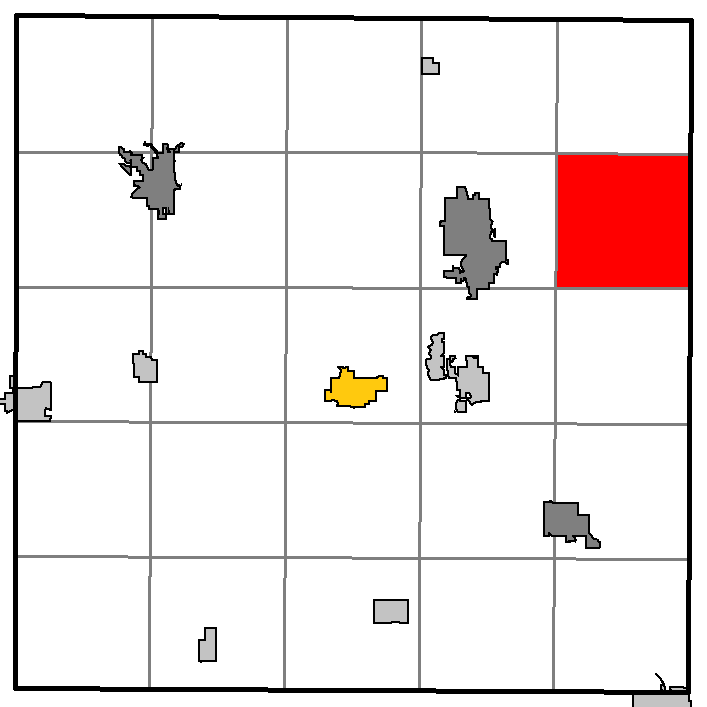
- Location of the Town of Doyle, within Barron County, Wisconsin

- Location of Barron County, Wisconsin
- Coordinates: 45°30′52″N 91°36′39″W
- Country: United States
- State: Wisconsin
- County: Barron

Area
  - Total: 35.6 sq mi (92.3 km^{2})
  - Land: 35.6 sq mi (92.3 km^{2})
  - Water: 0 sq mi (0.0 km^{2})
- Elevation: 1,204 ft (367 m)

Population (2020)
  - Total: 490
  - Density: 14/sq mi (5.3/km^{2})
- Time zone: UTC-6 (Central (CST))
  - Summer (DST): UTC-5 (CDT)
- Area codes: 715 & 534
- FIPS code: 55-20750
- GNIS feature ID: 1583097
- Website: https://www.townofdoyle.com/

The Town of Doyle is located in northeastern Barron County in the U.S. state of Wisconsin. The population was 490 at the 2020 census, up from 453 at the 2010 census. The unincorporated community of Horseman is located in the town. The unincorporated community of Campia is also located partially in the town.

== Etymology ==
The town was named for John J. Doyle, who was a former town chairman.

== Geography ==
The Town of Doyle is located on the border with Rusk County. The western end of the Blue Hills occupies the southern half of the town, with the highest point rising to 1,622 feet (494 m), or approximately 400 feet (120 m) higher than the surrounding countryside.

According to the United States Census Bureau, the town has a total area of 35.6 square miles (92.3 km^{2}), all land.

== Demographics ==
As of the census of 2000, there were 498 people, 177 households, and 133 families residing in the town. The population density was 14.0 people per square mile (5.4/km^{2}). There were 194 housing units at an average density of 5.4 per square mile (2.1/km^{2}). The racial makeup of the town was 99.40% White, 0.20% Asian, and 0.40% from two or more races.

There were 177 households, out of which 37.9% had children under the age of 18 living with them, 65.0% were married couples living together, 7.3% had a female householder with no husband present, and 24.3% were non-families. 16.9% of all households were made up of individuals, and 7.9% had someone living alone who was 65 years of age or older. The average household size was 2.81 and the average family size was 3.27.

The population was 30.3% under the age of 18, 7.6% from 18 to 24, 29.7% from 25 to 44, 20.3% from 45 to 64, and 12.0% who were 65 years of age or older. The median age was 37 years. For every 100 females, there were 106 males. For every 100 females age 18 and over, there were 109 males.

The median income for a household in the town was $40,481, and the median income for a family was $41,827. Males had a median income of $29,844 versus $20,179 for females. The per capita income for the town was $16,014. About 6.7% of families and 10.1% of the population were below the poverty line, including 16.8% of those under age 18 and 4.3% of those age 65 or over.

== Notable people ==
- George Mireau, farmer and politician
