= Oak Grove, Barron County, Wisconsin =

Oak Grove, Wisconsin
- Town
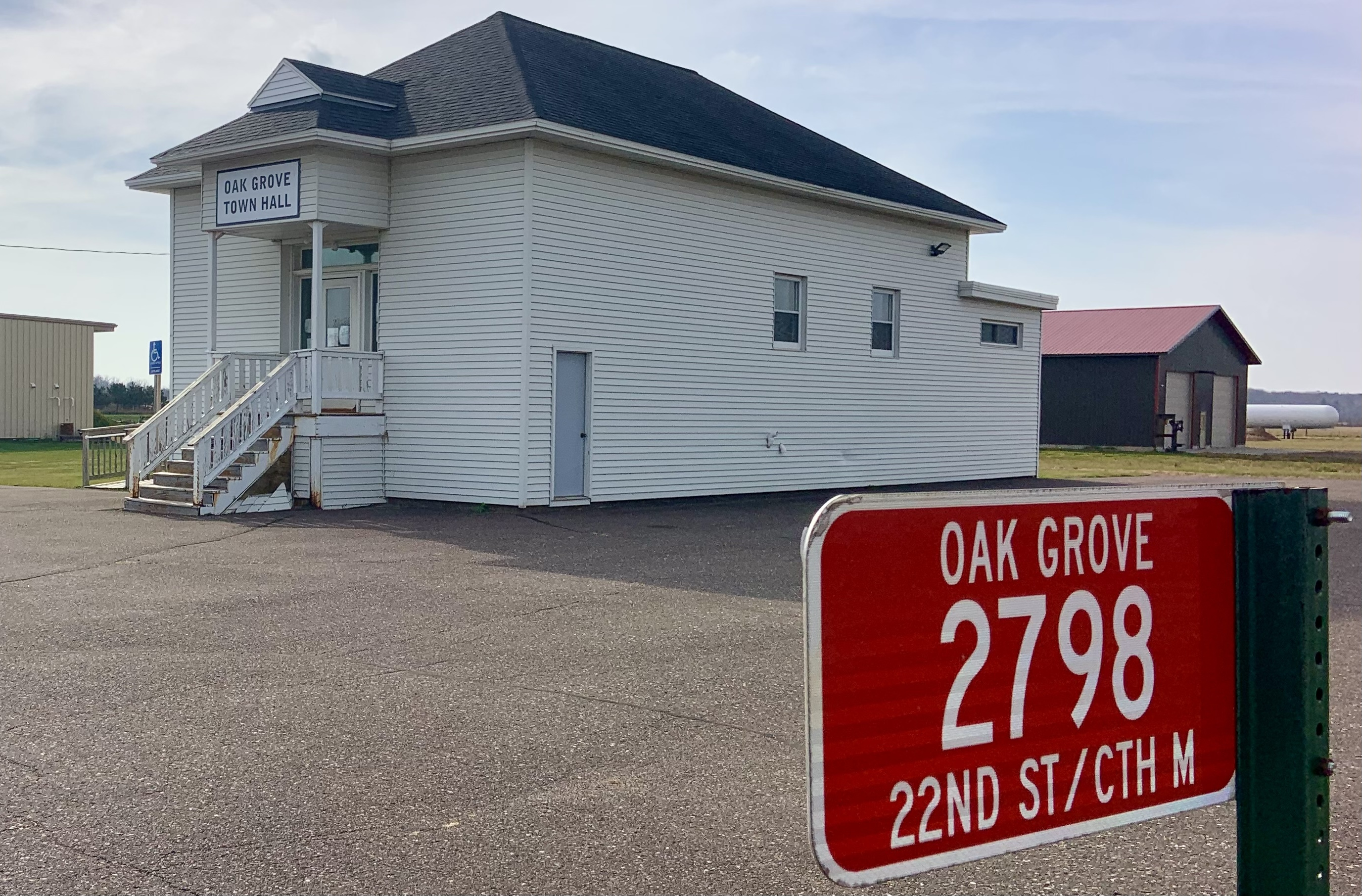
- Town hall

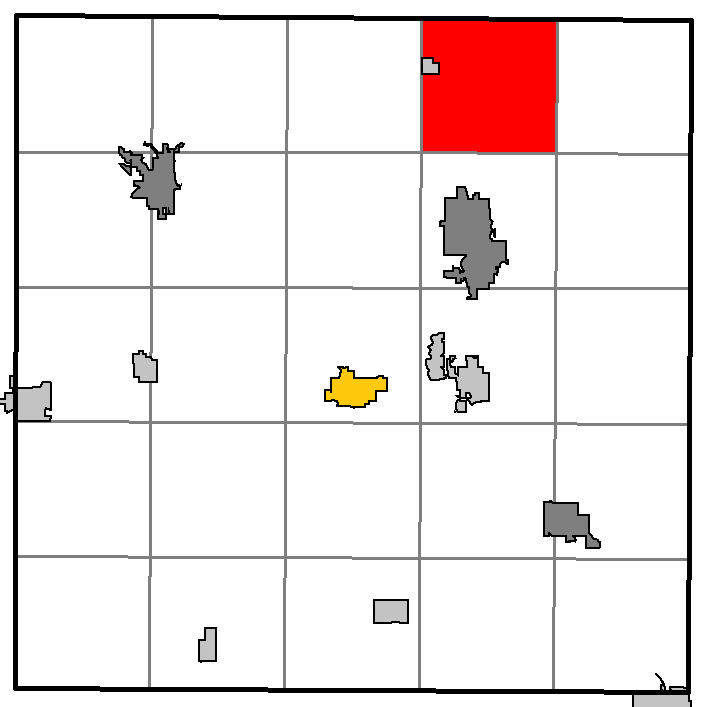
- Location of Oak Grove, within Barron County, Wisconsin

- Location of Barron County, Wisconsin
- Coordinates: 45°35′19″N 91°43′45″W
- Country: United States
- State: Wisconsin
- County: Barron

Area
  - Total: 35.2 sq mi (91.1 km^{2})
  - Land: 34.7 sq mi (89.9 km^{2})
  - Water: 0.46 sq mi (1.2 km^{2})
- Elevation: 1,220 ft (372 m)

Population (2020)
  - Total: 960
  - Density: 28/sq mi (11/km^{2})
- Time zone: UTC-6 (Central (CST))
  - Summer (DST): UTC-5 (CDT)
- Area codes: 715 & 534
- FIPS code: 55-58950
- GNIS feature ID: 1583840

Oak Grove is a town in Barron County in the U.S. state of Wisconsin. The population was 960 at the 2020 census, up from 948 at the 2010 census. The unincorporated communities of Brill and Tuscobia are located in the town. The unincorporated community of Dobie is also located partially in the town.

== Geography ==
Oak Grove is located along the northern edge of Barron County, with Washburn County to the north. The village of Haugen is located along the western edge of Oak Grove. U.S. Route 53 passes through the town, bypassing Haugen and leading south to Rice Lake and north to Spooner.

According to the United States Census Bureau, the town has a total area of 35.2 square miles (91.1 km^{2}), of which 34.7 square miles (89.9 km^{2}) is land and 0.46 square miles (1.2 km^{2}), or 1.29%, is water.

== Demographics ==
As of the census of 2000, there were 911 people, 313 households, and 256 families residing in the town. The population density was 26.2 people per square mile (10.1/km^{2}). There were 324 housing units at an average density of 9.3 per square mile (3.6/km^{2}). The racial makeup of the town was 97.37% White, 0.22% African American, 0.55% Native American, 0.22% Asian, 0.11% from other races, and 1.54% from two or more races. Hispanic or Latino people of any race were 0.66% of the population.

There were 313 households, out of which 39.9% had children under the age of 18 living with them, 70.6% were married couples living together, 6.1% had a female householder with no husband present, and 18.2% were non-families. 14.7% of all households were made up of individuals, and 5.4% had someone living alone who was 65 years of age or older. The average household size was 2.91 and the average family size was 3.17.

In the town, the population was spread out, with 29.1% under the age of 18, 8.6% from 18 to 24, 29.4% from 25 to 44, 22.4% from 45 to 64, and 10.5% who were 65 years of age or older. The median age was 35 years. For every 100 females, there were 106.1 males. For every 100 females age 18 and over, there were 110.4 males.

The median income for a household in the town was $43,088, and the median income for a family was $45,341. Males had a median income of $30,481 versus $18,860 for females. The per capita income for the town was $16,240. About 3.1% of families and 4.8% of the population were below the poverty line, including 4.6% of those under age 18 and 13.0% of those age 65 or over.
