= Vance Creek, Wisconsin =

- Town
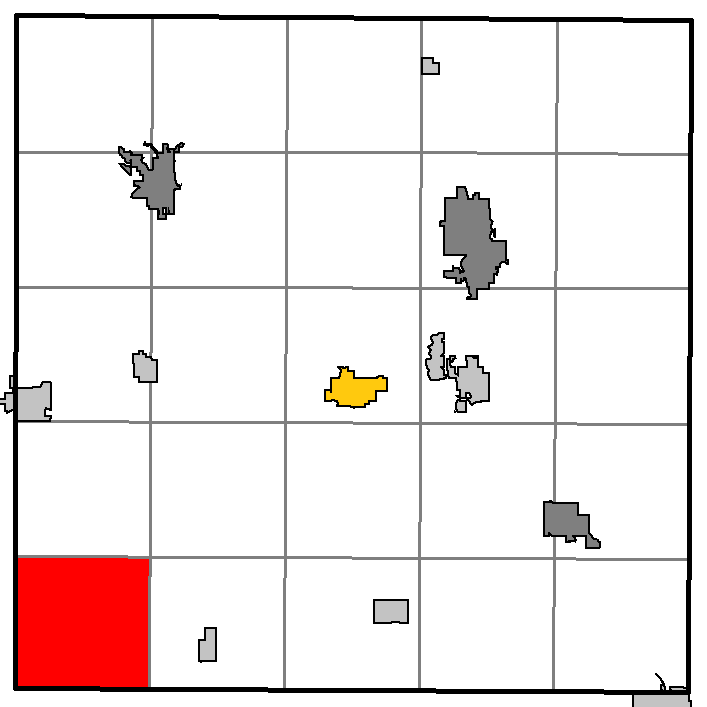
- Location of Vance Creek, within Barron County, Wisconsin

- Location of Barron County, Wisconsin
- Coordinates: 45°14′44″N 92°5′16″W
- Country: United States
- State: Wisconsin
- County: Barron

Area
  - Total: 35.4 sq mi (91.8 km^{2})
  - Land: 35.4 sq mi (91.7 km^{2})
  - Water: 0.039 sq mi (0.1 km^{2})
- Elevation: 1,207 ft (368 m)

Population (2020)
  - Total: 689
  - Density: 19.5/sq mi (7.51/km^{2})
- Time zone: UTC-6 (Central (CST))
  - Summer (DST): UTC-5 (CDT)
- Area codes: 715 & 534
- FIPS code: 55-82375
- GNIS feature ID: 1584325
- Website: www.townofvancecreek.com

Vance Creek is a town in Barron County in the U.S. state of Wisconsin. The population was 689 at the 2020 census, up from 669 at the 2010 census. The unincorporated community of Reeve is located in the town. The unincorporated community of Graytown is located partially in the town.

== Geography ==
Vance Creek occupies the southwestern corner of Barron County and is bounded by Polk County to the west and Dunn County to the south.

According to the United States Census Bureau, the town has a total area of 35.4 square miles (91.8 km^{2}), of which 35.4 square miles (91.7 km^{2}) is land and 0.04 square miles (0.1 km^{2}), or 0.10%, is water.

== Demographics ==
As of the census of 2000, there were 747 people, 257 households, and 194 families residing in the town. The population density was 21.1 people per square mile (8.1/km^{2}). There were 290 housing units at an average density of 8.2 per square mile (3.2/km^{2}). The racial makeup of the town was 98.39% White, 0.27% Native American, 0.67% Asian, and 0.67% from two or more races.

There were 257 households, out of which 35.4% had children under the age of 18 living with them, 63.4% were married couples living together, 5.1% had a female householder with no husband present, and 24.5% were non-families. 17.1% of all households were made up of individuals, and 6.6% had someone living alone who was 65 years of age or older. The average household size was 2.91 and the average family size was 3.31.

In the town, the population was spread out, with 30.8% under the age of 18, 8.3% from 18 to 24, 26.9% from 25 to 44, 22.2% from 45 to 64, and 11.8% who were 65 years of age or older. The median age was 35 years. For every 100 females, there were 108.1 males. For every 100 females age 18 and over, there were 112.8 males.

The median income for a household in the town was $39,821, and the median income for a family was $40,385. Males had a median income of $27,083 versus $19,444 for females. The per capita income for the town was $14,874. About 14.1% of families and 17.9% of the population were below the poverty line, including 27.4% of those under age 18 and 16.5% of those age 65 or over.
