= Lakeland, Wisconsin =

- Town
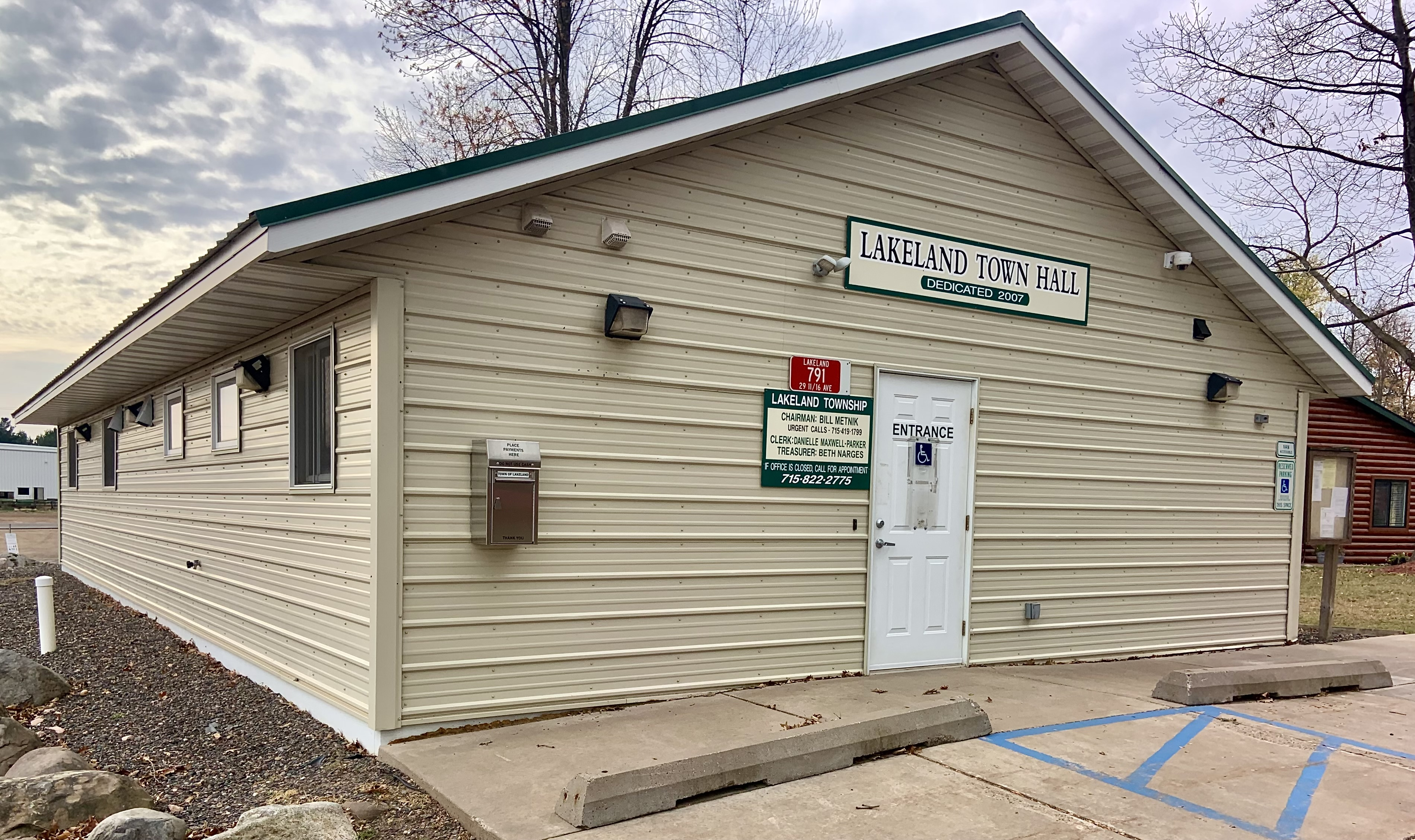
- Town hall in Barronett

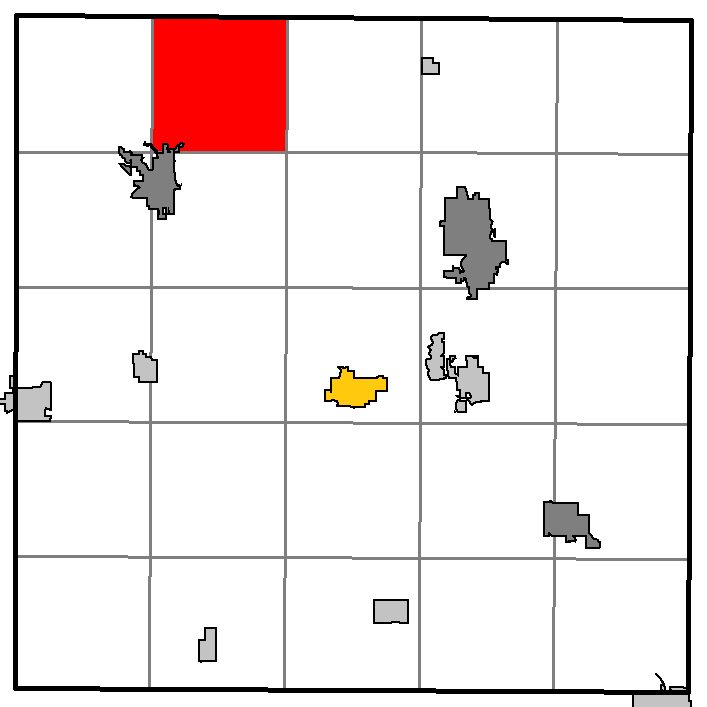
- Location of Lakeland, within Barron County, Wisconsin

- Location of Barron County, Wisconsin
- Coordinates: 45°35′54″N 91°58′15″W
- Country: United States
- State: Wisconsin
- County: Barron

Area
  - Total: 35.3 sq mi (91.4 km^{2})
  - Land: 33.0 sq mi (85.5 km^{2})
  - Water: 2.3 sq mi (5.9 km^{2})
- Elevation: 1,296 ft (395 m)

Population (2020)
  - Total: 938
  - Density: 28.4/sq mi (11.0/km^{2})
- Time zone: UTC-6 (Central (CST))
  - Summer (DST): UTC-5 (CDT)
- Area codes: 715 & 534
- FIPS code: 55-41600
- GNIS feature ID: 1583513
- Website: https://www.townoflakeland.wi.gov/

Lakeland is a town in Barron County in the U.S. state of Wisconsin. The population was 938 at the 2020 census, down from 975 at the 2010 census. The unincorporated community of Barronett is located in the town.

== Geography ==
Lakeland is located in northwestern Barron County, bordered on the north by Washburn County. There are at least 27 named lakes in the town, with the largest wholly within the town being Silver Lake in the southeast. U.S. Route 63 crosses the town from north to south, connecting Barronett with the city of Cumberland.

According to the United States Census Bureau, the town has a total area of 35.3 square miles (91.4 km^{2}), of which 33.0 square miles (85.5 km^{2}) is land and 2.3 square miles (5.9 km^{2}), or 6.48%, is water.

== Demographics ==
As of the census of 2000, there were 963 people, 378 households, and 280 families residing in the town. The population density was 29.1 people per square mile (11.3/km^{2}). There were 610 housing units at an average density of 18.5 per square mile (7.1/km^{2}). The racial makeup of the town was 97.82% White, 0.21% African American, 0.10% Native American, 0.31% Asian, 0.31% from other races, and 1.25% from two or more races. Hispanic or Latino of any race were 0.21% of the population.

There were 378 households, out of which 33.1% had children under the age of 18 living with them, 62.4% were married couples living together, 6.9% had a female householder with no husband present, and 25.9% were non-families. 20.6% of all households were made up of individuals, and 7.7% had someone living alone who was 65 years of age or older. The average household size was 2.55 and the average family size was 2.93.

In the town, the population was spread out, with 25.9% under the age of 18, 5.0% from 18 to 24, 27.1% from 25 to 44, 30.4% from 45 to 64, and 11.6% who were 65 years of age or older. The median age was 41 years. For every 100 females, there were 108.9 males. For every 100 females age 18 and over, there were 108.8 males.

The median income for a household in the town was $42,266, and the median income for a family was $48,173. Males had a median income of $30,870 versus $25,938 for females. The per capita income for the town was $21,152. About 3.1% of families and 4.1% of the population were below the poverty line, including 4.0% of those under age 18 and 7.6% of those age 65 or over.
