= Sumner, Barron County, Wisconsin =

Sumner, Wisconsin
- Town
- The Town of Sumner
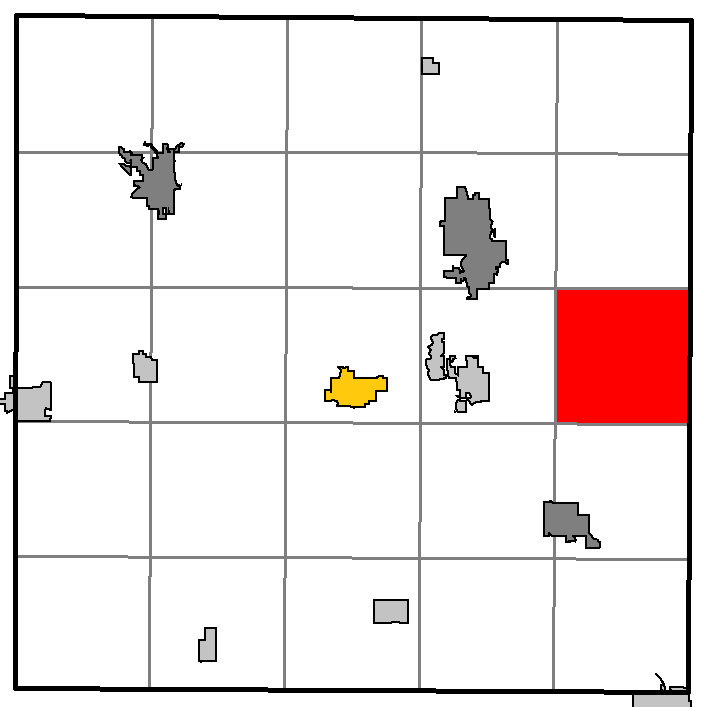
- Location of the Town of Sumner, within Barron County, Wisconsin

- Location of Barron County, Wisconsin
- Coordinates: 45°24′58″N 91°37′1″W
- Country: United States
- State: Wisconsin
- County: Barron

Area
  - Total: 35.68 sq mi (92.40 km^{2})
  - Land: 35.66 sq mi (92.37 km^{2})
  - Water: 0.012 sq mi (0.03 km^{2})
- Elevation: 1,201 ft (366 m)

Population (2020)
  - Total: 699
  - Density: 19.6/sq mi (7.57/km^{2})
- Time zone: UTC-6 (Central (CST))
  - Summer (DST): UTC-5 (CDT)
- Area codes: 715 & 534
- FIPS code: 55-78450
- GNIS feature ID: 1584251
- Website: https://www.townofsumner-wi.com/

The Town of Sumner is located in Barron County in the U.S. state of Wisconsin. The population was 699 at the 2020 census, down from 798 at the 2010 census. The unincorporated communities of Canton, Lehigh and Sumner are located in the town.

== Geography ==
The Town of Sumner is located along the eastern edge of Barron County, with Rusk County on its eastern border. U.S. Route 8 crosses the town from east to west.

According to the United States Census Bureau, the town has a total area of 35.7 square miles (92.4 km^{2}), of which 0.012 square miles (0.03 km^{2}), or 0.03%, is water.

== Demographics ==
As of the census of 2000, there were 598 people, 210 households, and 161 families residing in the town. The population density was 16.8 people per square mile (6.5/km^{2}). There were 222 housing units at an average density of 6.2 per square mile (2.4/km^{2}). The racial makeup of the town was 98.83% White, 0.17% African American, 0.17% Asian, and 0.84% from two or more races. Hispanic or Latino people of any race were 0.50% of the population.

There were 210 households, out of which 39.5% had children under the age of 18 living with them, 67.1% were married couples living together, 5.2% had a female householder with no husband present, and 22.9% were non-families. 17.1% of all households were made up of individuals, and 5.2% had someone living alone who was 65 years of age or older. The average household size was 2.85 and the average family size was 3.20.

In the town, the population was spread out, with 28.6% under the age of 18, 7.9% from 18 to 24, 30.4% from 25 to 44, 23.2% from 45 to 64, and 9.9% who were 65 years of age or older. The median age was 36 years. For every 100 females, there were 115.9 males. For every 100 females age 18 and over, there were 111.4 males.

The median income for a household in the town was $38,333, and the median income for a family was $41,406. Males had a median income of $31,518 versus $22,083 for females. The per capita income for the town was $17,279. About 5.9% of families and 8.2% of the population were below the poverty line, including 10.6% of those under age 18 and 9.9% of those age 65 or over.
