= Maple Plain, Wisconsin =

- Town
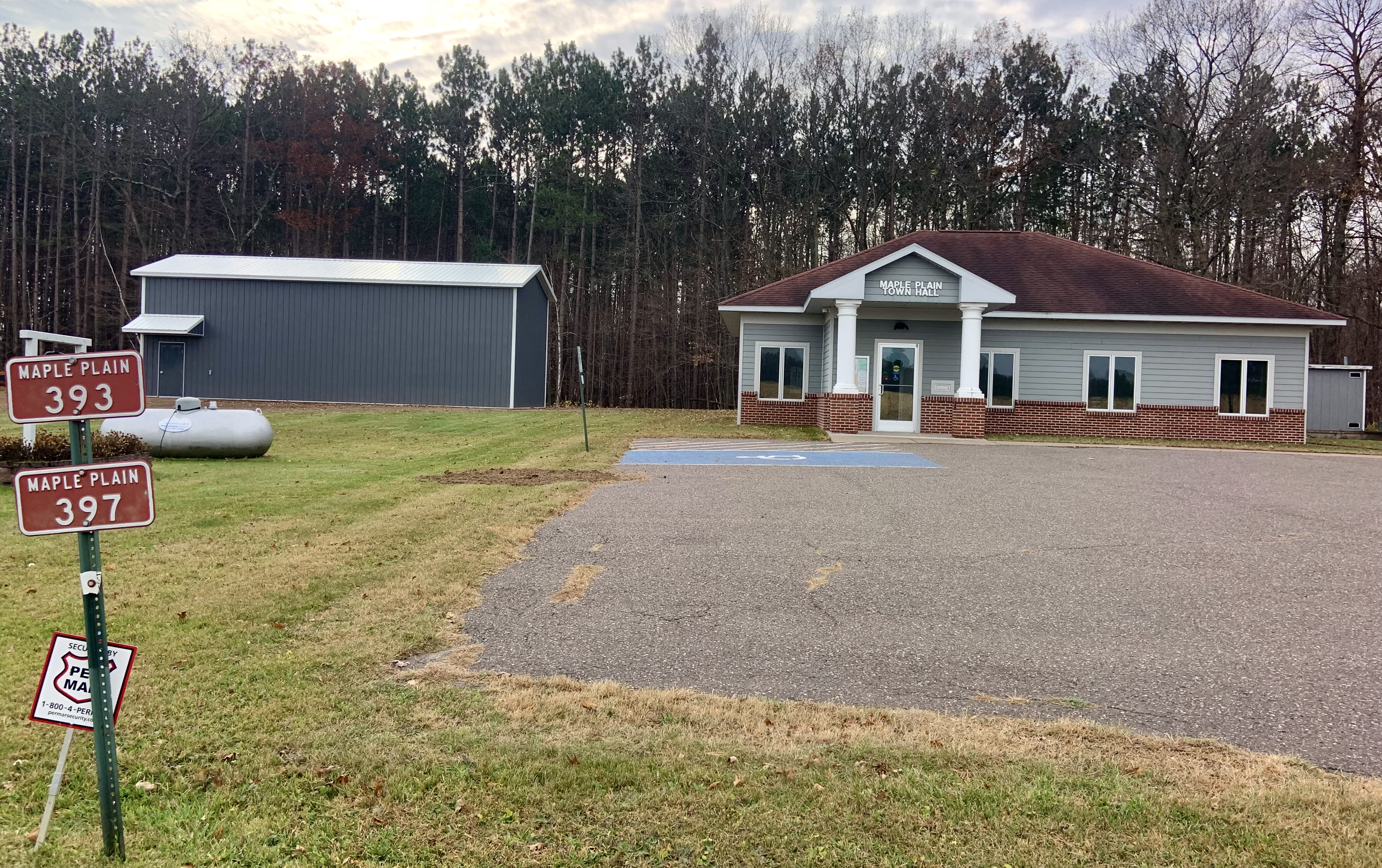
- Town hall

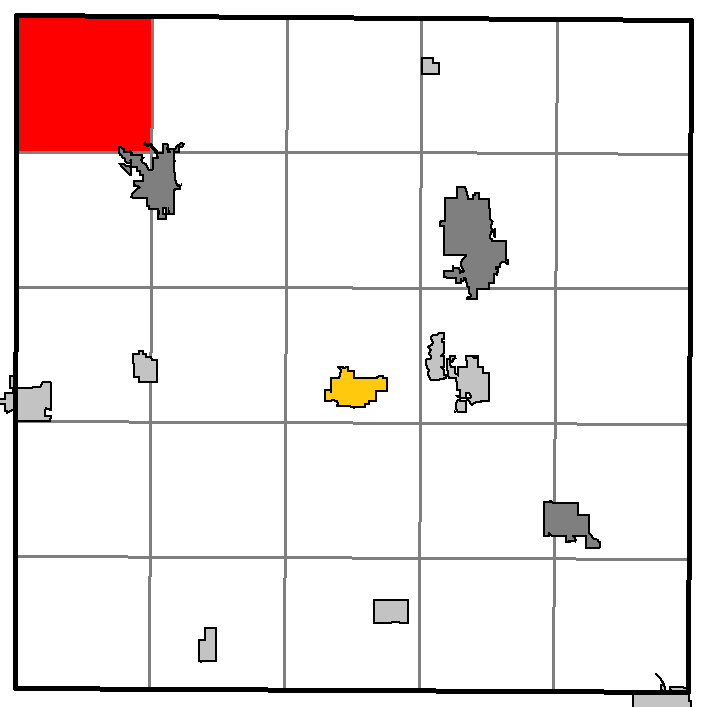
- Location of Maple Plain, within Barron County, Wisconsin

- Location of Barron County, Wisconsin
- Coordinates: 45°35′28″N 92°5′54″W
- Country: United States
- State: Wisconsin
- County: Barron

Area
  - Total: 35.9 sq mi (93.1 km^{2})
  - Land: 33.3 sq mi (86.3 km^{2})
  - Water: 2.6 sq mi (6.8 km^{2})
- Elevation: 1,300 ft (400 m)

Population (2020)
  - Total: 844
  - Density: 25.3/sq mi (9.78/km^{2})
- Time zone: UTC-6 (Central (CST))
  - Summer (DST): UTC-5 (CDT)
- Area codes: 715 & 534
- FIPS code: 55-48950
- GNIS feature ID: 1583646
- Website: https://www.townofmapleplain.wi.gov/

Maple Plain is a town in Barron County in the U.S. state of Wisconsin. The population was 844 at the 2020 census, up from 803 at the 2010 census.

== Geography ==
Maple Plain is in the northwest corner of Barron County, with Polk County to the west and Burnett County to the north. Sand Lake and Beaver Dam Lake cross the town from northwest to southeast. Wisconsin Highway 48 crosses the southwest portion of the town, leading southeast to Cumberland and west to Luck.

According to the United States Census Bureau, the town has a total area of 35.9 square miles (93.1 km^{2}), of which 33.3 square miles (86.3 km^{2}) is land and 2.6 square miles (6.8 km^{2}), or (7.50%) is water.

== Demographics ==
As of the census of 2000, there were 876 people, 323 households, and 252 families residing in the town. The population density was 26.3 people per square mile (10.2/km^{2}). There were 667 housing units at an average density of 20.0 per square mile (7.7/km^{2}). The racial makeup of the town was 83.45% White, 0.11% African American, 15.75% Native American, and 0.68% from two or more races.

There were 323 households, out of which 33.7% had children under the age of 18 living with them, 63.8% were married couples living together, 9.6% had a female householder with no husband present, and 21.7% were non-families. 17.3% of all households were made up of individuals, and 6.2% had someone living alone who was 65 years of age or older. The average household size was 2.71 and the average family size was 3.01.

In the town, the population was spread out, with 28.3% under the age of 18, 5.6% from 18 to 24, 26.4% from 25 to 44, 28.8% from 45 to 64, and 11.0% who were 65 years of age or older. The median age was 40 years. For every 100 females, there were 100.0 males. For every 100 females age 18 and over, there were 98.7 males.

The median income for a household in the town was $47,333, and the median income for a family was $50,417. Males had a median income of $31,458 versus $24,531 for females. The per capita income for the town was $18,673. Below the poverty line were 11.2% of people, 5.1% of families, 12.2% of those under 18 and 11.1% of those over 64.
