= Barron County, Wisconsin =

County in Wisconsin, United States

- County
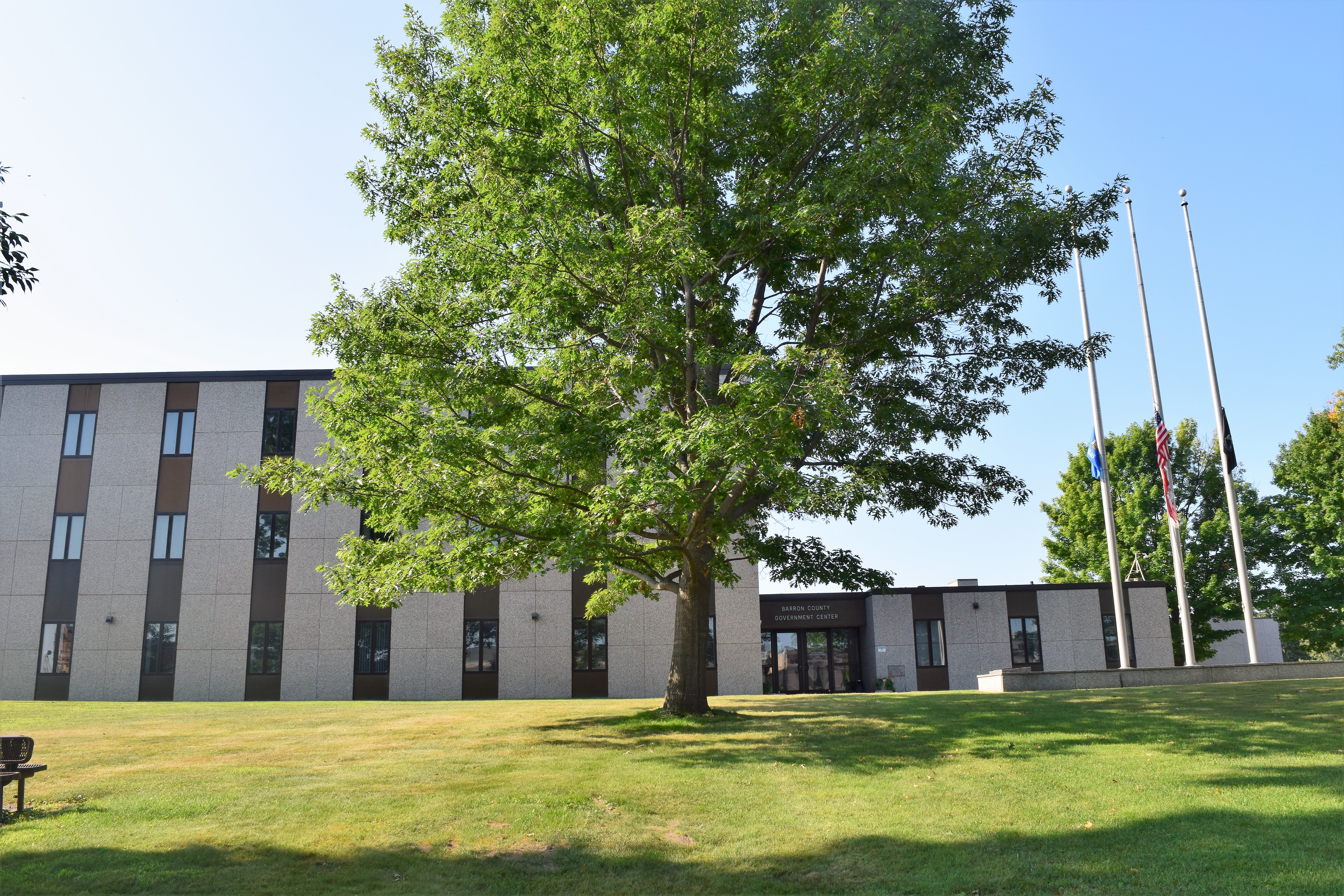
- Barron County Government Center

- Location within the U.S. state of Wisconsin
- Coordinates: 45°25′N 91°51′W
- Country: United States
- State: Wisconsin
- Founded: 1874
- Named for: Henry D. Barron
- Seat: Barron
- Largest city: Rice Lake

Area
  - Total: 890 sq mi (2,300 km^{2})
  - Land: 863 sq mi (2,240 km^{2})
  - Water: 27 sq mi (70 km^{2}) 3.0%

Population (2020)
  - Total: 46,711
  - Estimate (2025): 46,484 ▼
  - Density: 54.1/sq mi (20.9/km^{2})
- Time zone: UTC−6 (Central)
  - Summer (DST): UTC−5 (CDT)
- Congressional district: 7th
- Website: www.barroncountywi.gov

Barron County is a county located in the U.S. state of Wisconsin. As of the 2020 census, the population was 46,711. Its county seat is Barron. The county was created in 1859 and organized in 1874.

== History ==
The county was created in 1859 as Dallas County (named after Vice President George M. Dallas), with the county seat located at Barron. It was renamed Barron County on March 4, 1869. The county's name honors Wisconsin lawyer and politician Henry D. Barron, who served as circuit judge of the Eleventh Judicial Circuit. Barron County was organized in 1874.

In the late 1800s and early 1900s, a community of Russian immigrants moved to Barron County.

== Geography ==
According to the U.S. Census Bureau, the county has a total area of 890 square miles (2,300 km^{2}), of which 863 square miles (2,240 km^{2}) is land and 27 square miles (70 km^{2}) (3.0%) is water.

=== Adjacent counties ===
- Washburn County – north
- Sawyer County – northeast
- Rusk County – east
- Chippewa County – southeast
- Dunn County – south
- St. Croix County – southwest
- Polk County – west
- Burnett County – northwest

=== Major highways ===
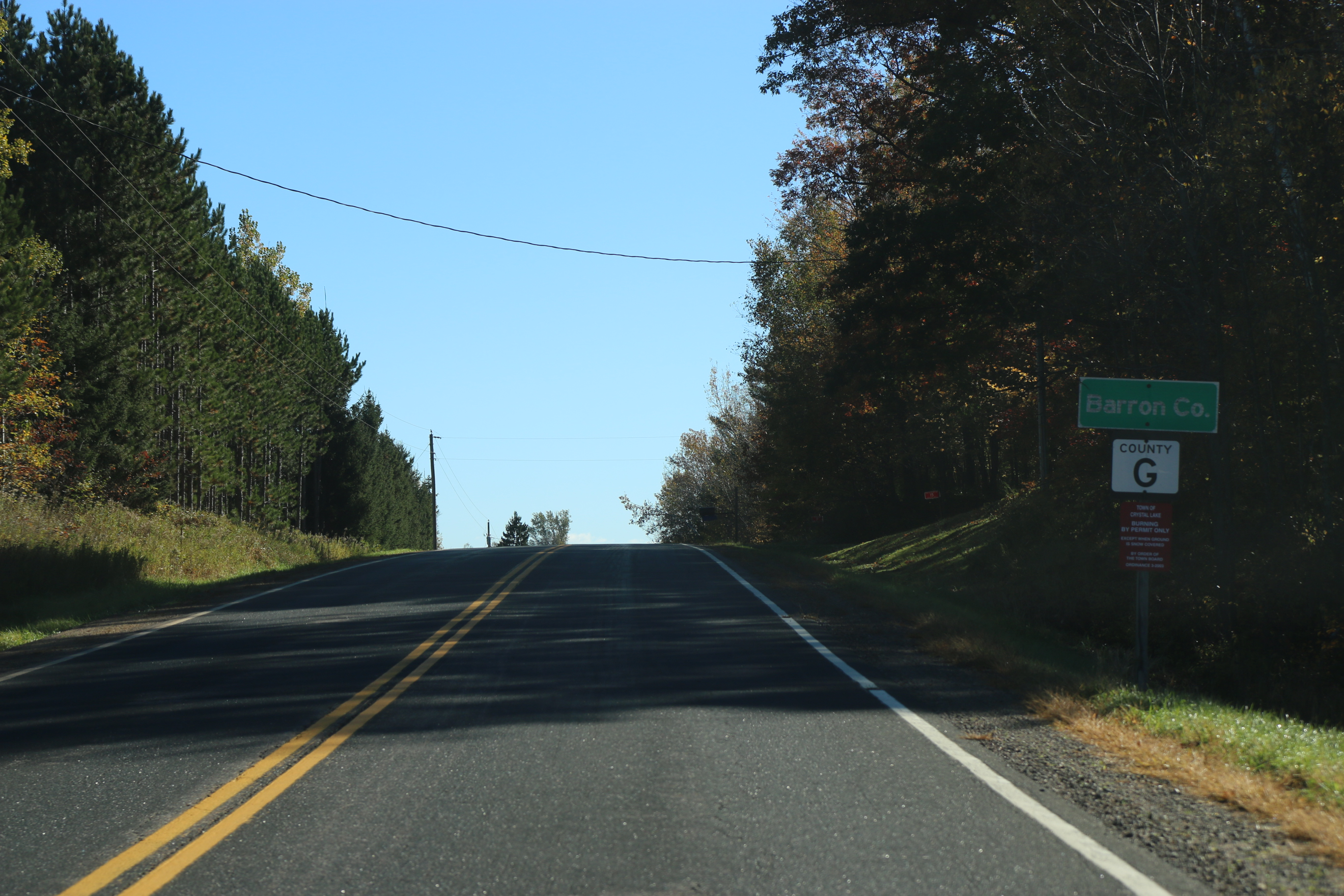
The county sign for Barron County on County G

- U.S. Highway 8
- U.S. Highway 53
- U.S. Highway 63
- Highway 25 (Wisconsin)
- Highway 48 (Wisconsin)

=== Railroads ===
- Wisconsin Northern Railroad
- Canadian National

=== Airports ===
- KRPD – Rice Lake Regional Airport serves Barron County.
- KUBE – Cumberland Municipal Airport is located three miles south of Cumberland.
- Y23 – Chetek Municipal–Southworth Airport also serves the county and surrounding communities.
- 9Y7 – Barron Municipal Airport enhances county service.

== Demographics ==
Historical population
Census	Pop.	Note	%±
1860	13		—
1870	538		4,038.5%
1880	7,024		1,205.6%
1890	15,416		119.5%
1900	23,677		53.6%
1910	29,114		23.0%
1920	34,281		17.7%
1930	34,301		0.1%
1940	34,289		0.0%
1950	34,703		1.2%
1960	34,270		−1.2%
1970	33,955		−0.9%
1980	38,730		14.1%
1990	40,750		5.2%
2000	44,963		10.3%
2010	45,870		2.0%
2020	46,711		1.8%
2025 (est.)	46,484	▼	−0.5%
U.S. Decennial Census; 1790–1960 1900–1990; 1990–2000 2010 2020

=== Racial and ethnic composition ===
Barron County, Wisconsin – Racial and ethnic composition Note: the US Census treats Hispanic/Latino as an ethnic category. This table excludes Latinos from the racial categories and assigns them to a separate category. Hispanics/Latinos may be of any race.
Race / ethnicity (NH = Non-Hispanic)	Pop 1980	Pop 1990	Pop 2000	Pop 2010	Pop 2020	% 1980	% 1990	% 2000	% 2010	% 2020
White alone (NH)	38,351	40,255	43,667	43,567	42,210	99.02%	98.79%	97.12%	94.98%	90.36%
Black or African American alone (NH)	11	36	55	397	813	0.03%	0.09%	0.12%	0.87%	1.74%
Native American or Alaska Native alone (NH)	152	207	358	380	436	0.39%	0.51%	0.80%	0.83%	0.93%
Asian alone (NH)	41	86	141	220	345	0.11%	0.21%	0.31%	0.48%	0.74%
Native Hawaiian or Pacific Islander alone (NH)	x	x	15	3	5	x	x	0.03%	0.01%	0.01%
Other race alone (NH)	44	2	8	10	99	0.11%	0.00%	0.02%	0.02%	0.21%
Mixed race or Multiracial (NH)	x	x	289	431	1,526	x	x	0.64%	0.94%	3.27%
Hispanic or Latino (any race)	131	164	430	862	1,277	0.34%	0.40%	0.96%	1.88%	2.73%
Total	38,730	40,750	44,963	45,870	46,711	100.00%	100.00%	100.00%	100.00%	100.00%

=== 2020 census ===
As of the 2020 census, the population was 46,711. The population density was 54.1 people per square mile (20.9 people/km^{2}). There were 23,779 housing units at an average density of 27.6 units per square mile (10.7 units/km^{2}).

The racial makeup of the county was 91.1% White, 1.8% Black or African American, 1.0% American Indian and Alaska Native, 0.7% Asian, <0.1% Native Hawaiian and Pacific Islander, 1.2% from some other race, and 4.2% from two or more races. Hispanic or Latino residents of any race comprised 2.7% of the population.

The median age was 45.1 years, 21.1% of residents were under the age of 18, and 22.8% were 65 years of age or older. For every 100 females there were 99.5 males, and for every 100 females age 18 and over there were 98.5 males.

21.7% of residents lived in urban areas, while 78.3% lived in rural areas.

There were 19,630 households in the county, of which 25.6% had children under the age of 18 living in them. Of all households, 49.8% were married-couple households, 19.2% were households with a male householder and no spouse or partner present, and 22.4% were households with a female householder and no spouse or partner present. About 29.2% of all households were made up of individuals and 14.2% had someone living alone who was 65 years of age or older.

There were 23,779 housing units, of which 17.4% were vacant. Among occupied housing units, 73.2% were owner-occupied and 26.8% were renter-occupied. The homeowner vacancy rate was 1.1% and the rental vacancy rate was 6.1%.

=== 2000 census ===
2000 Census Age Pyramid for Barron County

As of the census of 2000, there were 44,963 people, 17,851 households, and 12,352 families residing in the county. The population density was 52 people per square mile (20 people/km^{2}). There were 20,969 housing units at an average density of 24 units per square mile (9.3 units/km^{2}). The racial makeup of the county was 97.69% White, 0.14% Black or African American, 0.81% Native American, 0.32% Asian, 0.04% Pacific Islander, 0.32% from other races, and 0.69% from two or more races. 0.96% of the population were Hispanic or Latino of any race. 34.4% were of German, 21.8% Norwegian and 5.3% Irish ancestry.

There were 17,851 households, out of which 31.30% had children under the age of 18 living with them, 56.90% were married couples living together, 8.20% had a female householder with no husband present, and 30.80% were non-families. 25.40% of all households were made up of individuals, and 12.20% had someone living alone who was 65 years of age or older. The average household size was 2.48 and the average family size was 2.97.

In the county, the population was spread out, with 25.30% under the age of 18, 8.10% from 18 to 24, 26.80% from 25 to 44, 23.40% from 45 to 64, and 16.40% who were 65 years of age or older. The median age was 39 years. For every 100 females there were 98.20 males. For every 100 females age 18 and over, there were 96.00 males.

In 2017, there were 504 births, giving a general fertility rate of 70.6 births per 1000 women aged 15–44, the 15th highest rate out of all 72 Wisconsin counties. Additionally, there were fewer than five reported induced abortions performed on women of Barron County residence in 2017.

== Communities ==
=== Cities ===
- Barron (county seat)
- Chetek
- Cumberland
- Rice Lake

=== Villages ===
- Almena
- Cameron
- Dallas
- Haugen
- New Auburn (mostly in Chippewa County)
- Prairie Farm
- Turtle Lake (partly in Polk County)

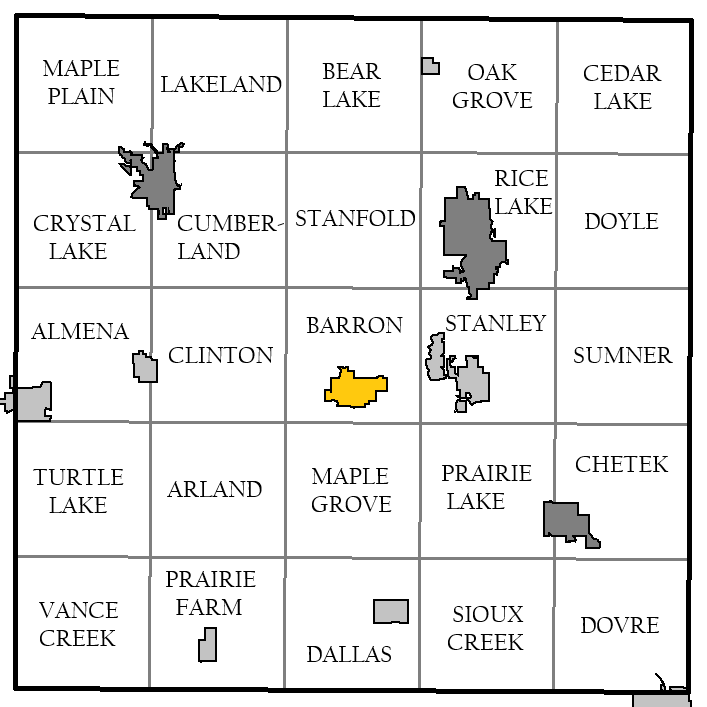
Towns of Barron County

=== Towns ===
- Almena
- Arland
- Barron
- Bear Lake
- Cedar Lake
- Chetek
- Clinton
- Crystal Lake
- Cumberland
- Dallas
- Dovre
- Doyle
- Lakeland
- Maple Grove
- Maple Plain
- Oak Grove
- Prairie Farm
- Prairie Lake
- Rice Lake
- Sioux Creek
- Stanfold
- Stanley
- Sumner
- Turtle Lake
- Vance Creek

=== Census-designated place ===
- Barronett

=== Unincorporated communities ===
- Angus
- Arland
- Brill
- Campia
- Canton
- Comstock
- Dobie
- Graytown (part)
- Hillsdale
- Horseman
- Lehigh
- Mikana
- Poskin
- Reeve
- Sumner
- Twin Town
- Tuscobia
- Wickware

== Politics ==
Barron County has been a longtime swing county, though it tended to more often vote Republican. The last Democrat to win the county was Barack Obama in 2008 and since then it has been consistently Republican. Donald Trump's performances in 2020 and subsequently in 2024 were the best by a Republican since the 1952 landslide election.

United States presidential election results for Barron County, Wisconsin
Year	Republican		Democratic		Third party(ies)	
Year	No.	%	No.	%	No.	%
1892	1,818	57.37%	767	24.20%	584	18.43%
1896	2,772	64.74%	1,324	30.92%	186	4.34%
1900	2,950	72.77%	943	23.26%	161	3.97%
1904	3,575	78.30%	625	13.69%	366	8.02%
1908	3,247	66.46%	1,266	25.91%	373	7.63%
1912	1,414	35.62%	1,065	26.83%	1,491	37.56%
1916	2,746	54.95%	1,863	37.28%	388	7.76%
1920	6,887	84.23%	742	9.08%	547	6.69%
1924	2,703	29.44%	377	4.11%	6,100	66.45%
1928	8,455	71.98%	3,185	27.12%	106	0.90%
1932	3,852	32.92%	7,413	63.35%	436	3.73%
1936	5,067	37.94%	7,419	55.55%	869	6.51%
1940	7,806	54.87%	6,183	43.46%	238	1.67%
1944	7,137	55.66%	5,585	43.55%	101	0.79%
1948	5,516	45.91%	6,148	51.17%	352	2.93%
1952	10,013	66.84%	4,902	32.72%	66	0.44%
1956	8,634	61.12%	5,419	38.36%	73	0.52%
1960	8,640	57.05%	6,464	42.68%	41	0.27%
1964	5,701	40.56%	8,332	59.28%	23	0.16%
1968	7,526	55.38%	5,183	38.14%	880	6.48%
1972	8,418	59.94%	5,376	38.28%	251	1.79%
1976	7,393	45.13%	8,678	52.97%	311	1.90%
1980	8,791	47.05%	8,654	46.32%	1,240	6.64%
1984	9,587	53.94%	8,061	45.36%	124	0.70%
1988	8,527	48.53%	8,951	50.94%	92	0.52%
1992	6,572	32.49%	8,063	39.86%	5,595	27.66%
1996	6,158	35.82%	8,025	46.68%	3,008	17.50%
2000	9,848	49.48%	8,928	44.86%	1,128	5.67%
2004	12,030	50.26%	11,696	48.86%	211	0.88%
2008	10,457	45.69%	12,078	52.77%	351	1.53%
2012	11,443	50.43%	10,890	47.99%	359	1.58%
2016	13,614	60.05%	7,889	34.80%	1,168	5.15%
2020	15,803	62.35%	9,194	36.27%	349	1.38%
2024	16,726	62.39%	8,941	33.35%	1,142	4.26%

== See also ==
- National Register of Historic Places listings in Barron County, Wisconsin
- List of counties in Wisconsin
