= Wisconsin Highway 87 =

State highway in Wisconsin, United States

State Trunk Highway 87
- WIS 87 highlighted in red

Route information
- Maintained by WisDOT
- Length: 25.82 mi (41.55 km)
- Existed: 1924–present

Major junctions
- South end: US 8 in St. Croix Falls
- WIS 48 in Anderson
- North end: WIS 48 / WIS 70 in Grantsburg

Location
- Country: United States
- State: Wisconsin
- Counties: Polk, Burnett

Highway system
- Wisconsin State Trunk Highway System; Interstate; US; State; Scenic; Rustic
← WIS 86	→ WIS 88

State Trunk Highway 87 (often called Highway 87, STH-87 or WIS 87) is a state highway in Polk and Burnett counties in the US state of Wisconsin that runs north–south in the northwestern portion of the state from St. Croix Falls to Grantsburg. It was first designated as a state highway in 1924.

== Route description ==
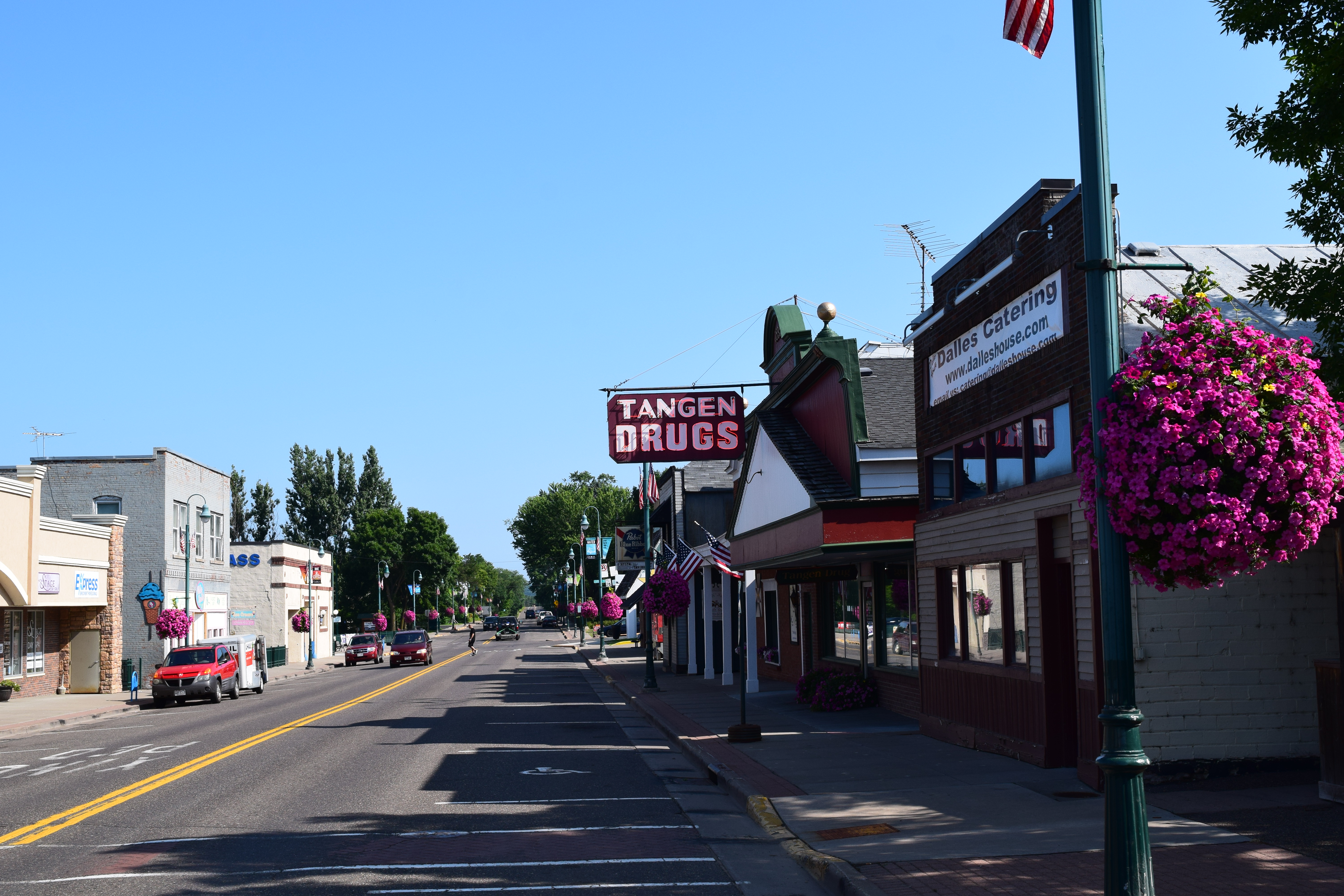
WIS 87 in St. Croix Falls, July 2018

The highway begins at an intersection with US Highway 8 (US 8) in St. Croix Falls, just east of the St. Croix River. The highway runs north from the intersection, running along Washington Street in St. Croix. The highway then follows the St. Croix River until it curves to the west. Soon after, the highway swerves to the west and meets County Trunk Highway I (CTH-I), running north from it. It then passes through Eureka Center and a one-mile (1.6 km) concurrency with CTH-G before reaching Cushing, from where it runs one mile (1.6 km) to the west before continuing north. The highway then passes by a few lakes and the community of Trade River, and then runs east of Fish Lake Wildlife Area. While running east of the wildlife area, it runs concurrently with WIS 48. After the wildlife area's boundary ends, the highway passes through Branstad before terminating with WIS 48 at WIS 70 in Grantsburg.

== History ==
In 1923, the highway in its entirety was signed as County Trunk Highway F (CTH-F). The next year, it was signed as WIS 87 alongside WIS 48, which it runs concurrently with near Grantsburg. The highway was unpaved along its entire route and would stay that way until at least 1956.

== Major intersections ==
County	Location	mi	km	Destinations	Notes
Polk	St. Croix Falls	0.0	0.0	US 8 – Turtle Lake, Barron, Cameron, Forest Lake, Stillwater; South Washington Street	Southern terminus; roadway continues as South Washington Street
Polk	St. Croix Falls–Eureka line	4.9	7.9	CTH-I east	
Polk	Eureka	9.9	15.9	CTH-G east	Southern end of CTH-G concurrency
Polk	Eureka–Sterling– Luck tripoint	10.9	17.5	CTH-G west	Northern end of CTH-G concurrency
Polk	Sterling	11.9	19.2	CTH-N east	
Burnett	Anderson	18.7	30.1	CTH-Z east	
Burnett	Anderson	20.7	33.3	CTH-O	
Burnett	Anderson	22.2	35.7	WIS 48 east – Frederic	Southern end of WIS 48 concurrency; road continues west as Grettum Dike Road
Burnett	Grantsburg	26.8	43.1	WIS 48 east / WIS 70 – Siren, Rock Creek; South Pine Street	Northern end of WIS 48 concurrency; western terminus of WIS 48; roadway continues as South Pine Street
1.000 mi = 1.609 km; 1.000 km = 0.621 mi: Concurrency terminus
