= Wisconsin Highway 48 =

State highway in Wisconsin, United States

State Trunk Highway 48
- WIS 48 highlighted in red

Route information
- Maintained by WisDOT
- Length: 98.19 mi (158.02 km)

Major junctions
- West end: WIS 70 / WIS 87 in Grantsburg
- US 63 in Cumberland; US 53 in Rice Lake
- East end: WIS 40 in Exeland

Location
- Country: United States
- State: Wisconsin
- Counties: Burnett, Polk, Barron, Washburn, Sawyer

Highway system
- Wisconsin State Trunk Highway System; Interstate; US; State; Scenic; Rustic
← WIS 47	→ WIS 49

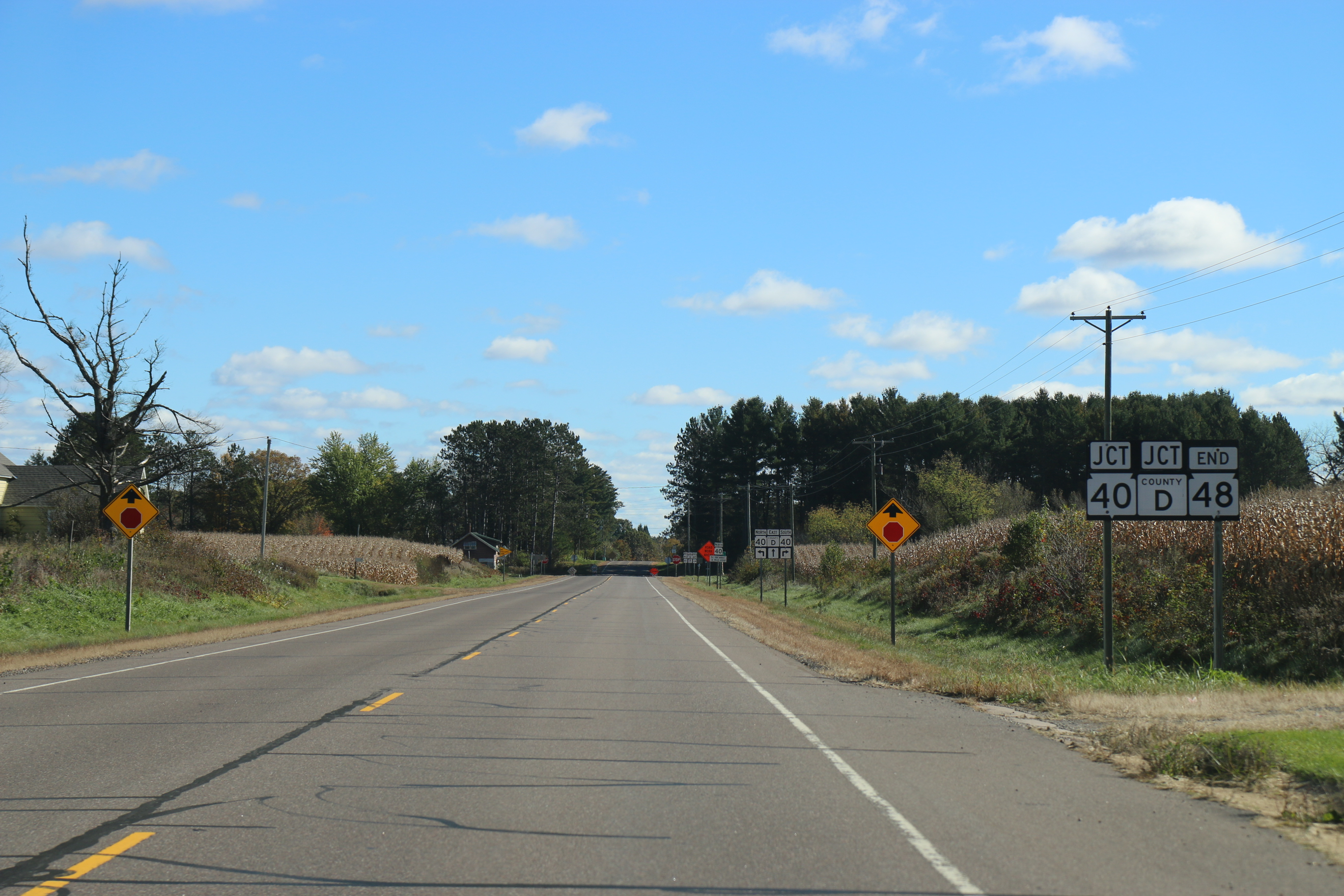
East terminus at WIS40

State Trunk Highway 48 (often called Highway 48, STH-48 or WIS 48) is a state highway in the U.S. state of Wisconsin. It runs east–west in northwest Wisconsin from Grantsburg to Weirgor.

== Route description ==
The highway begins at its intersection with Highway 70 in Grantsburg.The intersection is also the northern terminus of Highway 87. The highway runs south from the intersection in a concurrency with Highway 87, passing through the community of Branstad before leaving the concurrency and running east from it. Near Trade Lake, the highway intersects with four county highways; Y, O, M, and Z. It continues east from there until it reaches Frederic, where a concurrency starts with Highway 35. The highway continues south along the concurrency until it reaches Luck, where it runs east from. In Cumberland, it follows a short concurrency with U.S. Route 63. After passing Highway 25 and an interchange with U.S. Route 53, it passes through Rice Lake. It continues east from Rice Lake, passing through a few villages and unincorporated communities before terminating at Highway 40 in Weirgor.

== History ==
The first alignment of WIS 48 was routed from Sheboygan to Hilbert on the modern alignment of WIS 32 and WIS 57. Lasting around seven years, WIS 48 was replaced by WIS 32 in 1924 after being scaled back to New Holstein three years prior in 1921.

== Major intersections ==
County	Location	mi	km	Destinations	Notes
Burnett	Grantsburg	0.0	0.0	WIS 70 / WIS 87 ends – Siren, Rock Creek	Northern end of WIS 87 concurrency; northern erminus of WIS 87
Burnett	Anderson	4.6	7.4	WIS 87 south – St. Croix Falls	Southern end of WIS 87 concurrency
Polk	Frederic	17.2	27.7	WIS 35 north – Siren	Northern end of WIS 35 concurrency
Polk	Luck (town)–Luck (village) line	23.5	37.8	WIS 35 south – Milltown, St. Croix Falls	Southern end of WIS 35 concurrency
Barron	Crystal Lake–Cumberland line	46.5	74.8	US 63 south – Turtle Lake	Western end of US 63 concurrency
Barron	Cumberland	47.5	76.4	US 63 north – Spooner	Eastern end of US 63 concurrency
Barron	Stanfold	56.6	91.1	WIS 25 south – Barron	
Barron	Rice Lake	60.7	97.7	US 53 – Superior, Eau Claire	Diamond interchange
Washburn	No major junctions				
Sawyer	Weirgor	97.8	157.4	WIS 40 – Radisson, Bruce	
1.000 mi = 1.609 km; 1.000 km = 0.621 mi: Concurrency terminus
