= Prairie Lake (disambiguation) =

A prairie lake is a type of ephemeral lake.

Prairie Lake may also refer to:

== Places ==
- Prairie Lake, Wisconsin, a town in Barron County, Wisconsin, United States
- Prairie Lake Regional Park, a regional park in the Canadian province of Saskatchewan
- Prairie Lake Township, a township in Saint Louis County, Minnesota, United States.

== Bodies of water ==
- Howard Prairie Lake, a reservoir in Jackson County, Oregon, United States
- Prairie Lake (North Dakota), a lake in Stutsman County, North Dakota, United States
- Prairie Lee Lake, a reservoir located in Jackson County, Missouri, United States
