= Wickware =

Wickware may refer to:

- Wickware, Wisconsin, an unincorporated community in Barron County, Wisconsin, United States

== People with the surname ==
- Frank Wickware (1888–1967), American baseball player
