= Stanfold, Wisconsin =

- Town
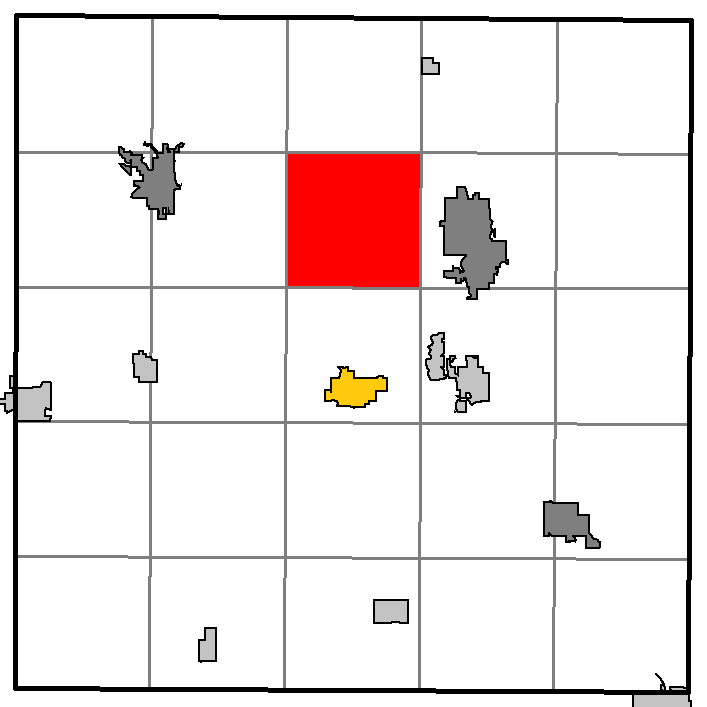
- Location of Stanfold, within Barron County, Wisconsin

- Location of Barron County, Wisconsin
- Coordinates: 45°30′19″N 91°51′18″W
- Country: United States
- State: Wisconsin
- County: Barron

Area
  - Total: 35.9 sq mi (93.0 km^{2})
  - Land: 35.9 sq mi (92.9 km^{2})
  - Water: 0.039 sq mi (0.1 km^{2})
- Elevation: 1,194 ft (364 m)

Population (2020)
  - Total: 701
  - Density: 19.5/sq mi (7.55/km^{2})
- Time zone: UTC-6 (Central (CST))
  - Summer (DST): UTC-5 (CDT)
- Area codes: 715 & 534
- FIPS code: 55-76550
- GNIS feature ID: 1584208
- Website: stanfold.org

Stanfold is a town in Barron County in the U.S. state of Wisconsin. The population was 701 at the 2020 census, down from 719 at the 2010 census.

== Geography ==
Stanfold is located north of the center of Barron County. Wisconsin Highway 48 crosses the town through its center, leading east to Rice Lake and west to Cumberland. Wisconsin Highway 25 leads south from Highway 48 towards Barron, the county seat.

According to the United States Census Bureau, Stanfold has a total area of 35.9 square miles (93.0 km^{2}), of which 35.9 square miles (92.9 km^{2}) is land and 0.04 square miles (0.1 km^{2}), or 0.13%, is water.

== Demographics ==
As of the census of 2000, there were 669 people, 249 households, and 194 families residing in the town. The population density was 18.6 people per square mile (7.2/km^{2}). There were 258 housing units at an average density of 7.2 per square mile (2.8/km^{2}). The racial makeup of the town was 98.21% White, 0.15% Native American, 0.90% Asian, and 0.75% from two or more races. Hispanic or Latino people of any race were 2.09% of the population.

There were 249 households, out of which 32.5% had children under the age of 18 living with them, 67.9% were married couples living together, 6.8% had a female householder with no husband present, and 21.7% were non-families. 17.3% of all households were made up of individuals, and 8.4% had someone living alone who was 65 years of age or older. The average household size was 2.67 and the average family size was 2.99.

In the town, the population was spread out, with 27.4% under the age of 18, 4.6% from 18 to 24, 30.0% from 25 to 44, 21.2% from 45 to 64, and 16.7% who were 65 years of age or older. The median age was 38 years. For every 100 females, there were 100.3 males. For every 100 females age 18 and over, there were 102.5 males.

The median income for a household in the town was $39,000, and the median income for a family was $42,292. Males had a median income of $27,917 versus $19,464 for females. The per capita income for the town was $15,683. About 4.2% of families and 5.7% of the population were below the poverty line, including 5.3% of those under age 18 and 6.7% of those age 65 or over.
