= UBE =

UBE or Ube may refer to:

== Organizations ==
- Ube Industries, a chemical company
- Union of Bookmakers Employees
- United Bank of Egypt, a bank co-owned by Banque du Caire
- Cumberland Municipal Airport (Wisconsin) (ITA code:UBE), in Cumberland, Wisconsin, US

== Places ==
- Ube, Yamaguchi, a city in Japan
- Upper Black Eddy, Pennsylvania, an unincorporated village in the US
- Cumberland Municipal Airport (Wisconsin) (ITA code:UBE), in Cumberland, Wisconsin, US

== Science, technology, and mathematics ==
=== Biology and medicine ===
- Ube (Dioscorea alata), also known as the purple yam, a species of edible yams
- Ubiquitin-activating enzyme
- Unilateral Biportal Endoscopy
- Upper body ergometer, a type of exercise equipment

=== Other uses in science, technology, and mathematics ===
- Unbiennium, an undiscovered superactinide chemical element
- Union bound estimate, a probability theory bound
- Unrecoverable bit error rate, a media assessment measure related to the hard disk drive storage technology
- Unsolicited bulk email, a type of email spam

== Other uses ==
- Ube halaya, a Philippine dessert made from boiled and mashed purple yam
- Uniform Bar Examination, in the US
- Universal Basic Education, education system in Nigeria
