= Cumberland (town), Wisconsin =

Town in Barron County, Wisconsin, U.S.

Cumberland, Wisconsin
- Town
- Town of Cumberland
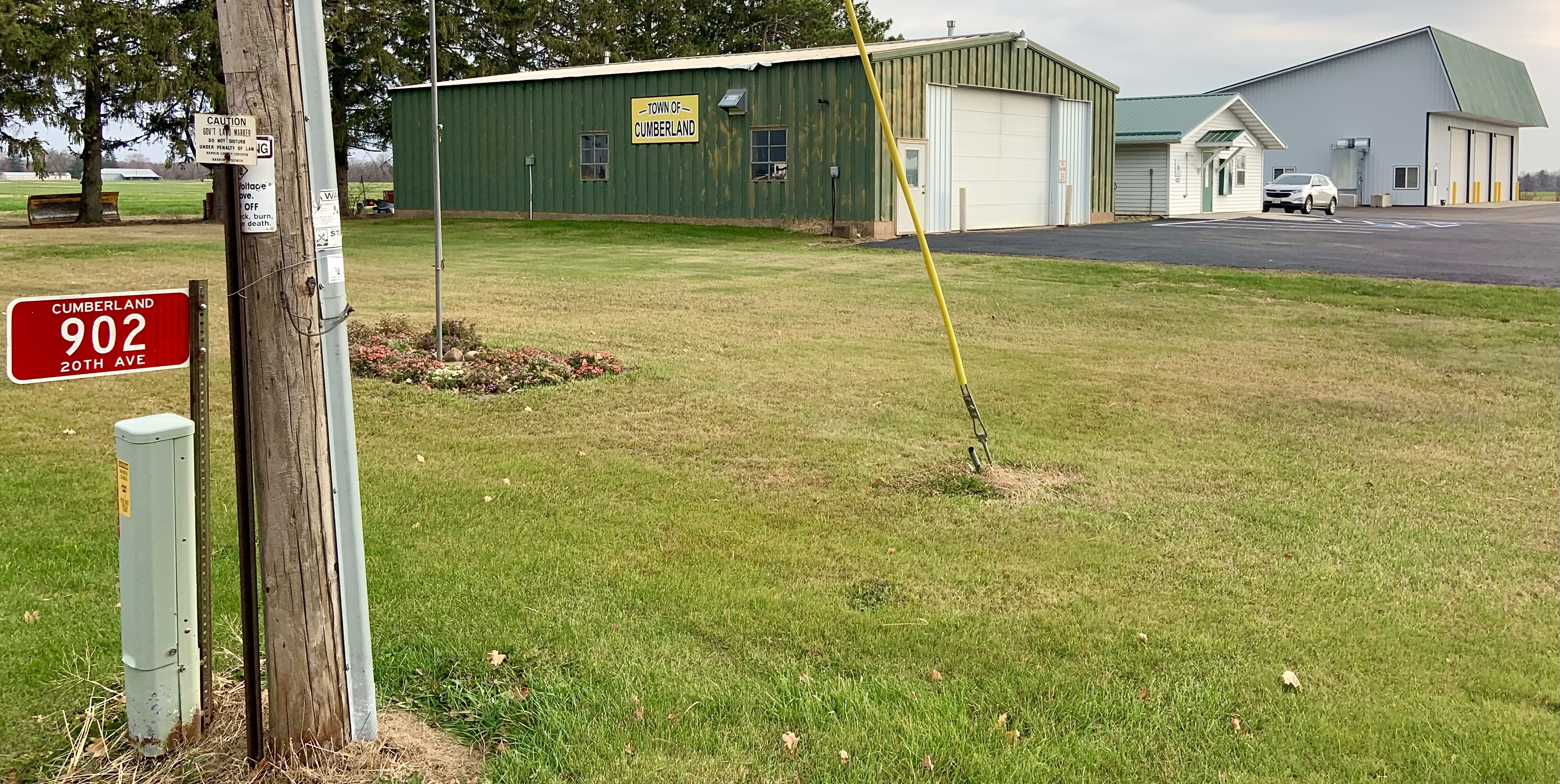
- Cumberland Town Hall

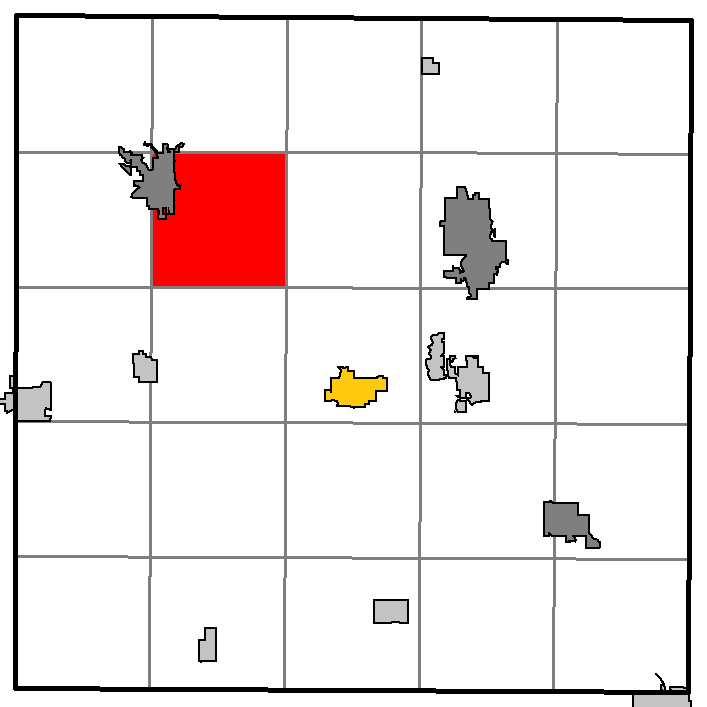
- Location of Cumberland, within Barron County, Wisconsin

- Location of Barron County, Wisconsin
- Coordinates: 45°30′29″N 91°58′01″W
- Country: United States
- State: Wisconsin
- County: Barron

Area
  - Total: 32.82 sq mi (85.0 km^{2})
  - Land: 31.83 sq mi (82.4 km^{2})
  - Water: 0.99 sq mi (2.6 km^{2})

Population (2020)
  - Total: 818
  - Density: 25.7/sq mi (9.92/km^{2})
- Time zone: UTC-6 (Central (CST))
  - Summer (DST): UTC-5 (CDT)
- ZIP Code: 54829
- Area code(s): 715 & 534
- GNIS feature ID: 1583037

Cumberland is a town in Barron County in the U.S. state of Wisconsin. The population was 818 at the 2020 census, down from 876 at the 2010 census. The City of Cumberland is located partially within the town.

== Geography ==
The town of Cumberland is located northwest of the center of Barron County. The city of Cumberland takes up what would have been the northwestern corner of the town, at the southeastern end of Beaver Dam Lake. The easternmost end of the lake extends into the town of Cumberland. The lake is the source of the Hay River, which flows south across Cumberland into the town of Clinton on its way to the Red Cedar River.

Wisconsin Highway 48 runs across the northern part of the town, connecting the city of Cumberland to the west with Rice Lake to the east.

According to the United States Census Bureau, the town of Cumberland has a total area of 32.9 square miles (85.3 km^{2}), of which 32.0 square miles (82.8 km^{2}) is land and 0.97 square miles (2.5 km^{2}), or 2.88%, is water.

== Demographics ==
As of the census of 2000, there were 942 people, 360 households, and 288 families residing in the town. The population density was 29.3 people per square mile (11.3/km^{2}). There were 425 housing units at an average density of 13.2 per square mile (5.1/km^{2}). The racial makeup of the town was 99.47% White, 0.11% Black or African American, 0.11% Native American, 0.11% from other races, and 0.21% from two or more races. Hispanic or Latino people of any race were 0.64% of the population.

There were 360 households, out of which 30.8% had children under the age of 18 living with them, 69.7% were married couples living together, 6.9% had a female householder with no husband present, and 20.0% were non-families. 15.8% of all households were made up of individuals, and 8.3% had someone living alone who was 65 years of age or older. The average household size was 2.62 and the average family size was 2.92.

In the town, the population was spread out, with 25.2% under the age of 18, 5.8% from 18 to 24, 26.9% from 25 to 44, 24.7% from 45 to 64, and 17.4% who were 65 years of age or older. The median age was 41 years. For every 100 females, there were 115.6 males. For every 100 females age 18 and over, there were 108.0 males.

The median income for a household in the town was $40,521, and the median income for a family was $42,125. Males had a median income of $30,893 versus $24,844 for females. The per capita income for the town was $18,061. About 6.3% of families and 8.1% of the population were below the poverty line, including 8.7% of those under age 18 and 7.4% of those age 65 or over.
