= Wisconsin Highway 25 =

State highway in Wisconsin, United States

State Trunk Highway 25
- WIS 25 highlighted in red

Route information
- Maintained by WisDOT
- Length: 85.81 mi (138.10 km)

Major junctions
- South end: MN 60 in Nelson
- US 10 / WIS 85 in Durand; US 12 / WIS 29 in Menomonie; I-94 in Menomonie; US 8 in Barron
- North end: WIS 48 in Rice Lake

Location
- Country: United States
- State: Wisconsin
- Counties: Buffalo, Pepin, Dunn, Barron

Highway system
- Wisconsin State Trunk Highway System; Interstate; US; State; Scenic; Rustic
← WIS 24	→ WIS 26

State Trunk Highway 25 (often called Highway 25, STH-25 or WIS 25) is a state highway in the US state of Wisconsin. The highway serves local traffic in the western part of the state, connecting Durand, Menomonie and Barron. It is two-lane surface road with the exception of urban multilanes within Menomonie.

== Route description ==
WIS 25 begins at the Minnesota state line in Buffalo County on the Mississippi River. The route enters the state from Trunk Highway 60. WIS 25 briefly follows WIS 35 north in Nelson then follows the Chippewa River, passing through Maxville and entering Pepin County. After about three miles (4.8 km), WIS 25 enters Durand and joins US 10 west. After two miles (3.2 km) of concurrency, WIS 25 turns off northeast and enters Dunn County four miles (6.4 km) northeast.

WIS 25 junctions with WIS 72 in Downsville six miles (9.7 km) north of the county line. After another seven miles (11 km), WIS 25 enters Menomonie, junctions with WIS 29 near the University of Wisconsin–Stout campus and joins US 12 in the downtown area near Lake Menomin. WIS 25 splits from US 12 after a one-mile (1.6 km) concurrency with US 12 turning northwest. WIS 25 interchanges with I-94 one-half mile north of the US 12 turnoff. After a ten-mile (16 km) segment, the highway crosses WIS 170 in Wheeler. About five miles (8.0 km) north of Wheeler, WIS 25 joins WIS 64 east for one mile (1.6 km) before turning north again. The highway passes through Ridgeland on the Barron County line. WIS 25 passes west of Dallas, and through the small community of Hillsdale before entering Barron thirteen miles (21 km) north of the county line. The highway crosses US 8 in Barron. WIS 25 terminates at WIS 48 seven miles (11 km) north of Barron, or five miles (8.0 km) east of Rice Lake

== History ==
The original alignment of WIS 25 was along the present-day route from Nelson to Menomonie. From Nelson southward, WIS 25 followed the routing of present-day WIS 35 to junction with then WIS 52 at Galesville. The route was truncated at Durand in the early 1920s and also extended to end at then WIS 14 (present day US 8) and to WIS 48 a few years later. The route was extended again to Nelson when WIS 35 was rerouted across a new bridge over the Chippewa River in 1933. Finally in 1947, The route was extended through Nelson and across the Mississippi River and connected to MN 60.

== Major intersections ==
County	Location	mi	km	Destinations	Notes
Buffalo	Nelson			MN 60 west – Wabasha	Southern terminus
Buffalo	Nelson			WIS 35 south / Great River Road – Alma	South end of WIS 35 concurrency
Buffalo	Nelson			WIS 35 north / Great River Road – Pepin	North end of WIS 35 concurrency
Buffalo	Maxville			CTH-K	
Pepin	Durand			US 10 east / WIS 85 east – Mondovi, Eau Claire	Southern end of US 10 concurrency; western terminus of WIS 85
Pepin	Durand			US 10 west – Ellsworth	Northern end of US 10 concurrency
Dunn	Downsville			WIS 72 west – Elmwood	Eastern terminus of WIS 72
Dunn	Menomonie			WIS 29 west – Spring Valley	Southern end of WIS 29 concurrency
Dunn	Menomonie			US 12 east / WIS 29 east – Elk Mound, Chippewa Falls	Northern end of WIS 29 concurrency; southern end of US 12 concurrency
Dunn	Menomonie			US 12 west – Knapp	Northern end of US 12 concurrency
Dunn	Menomonie			I-94 – Hudson, Eau Claire	Exit 41 on I-94
Dunn	Wheeler			WIS 170 – Boyceville, Colfax	
Dunn	Sheridan			WIS 64 west – Connorsville	Southern end of WIS 64 concurrency
Dunn	Wilson			WIS 64 east – Cornell	Northern end of WIS 64 concurrency
Dunn	Ridgeland			CTH-V	
Barron	Hillsdale			CTH-D	
Barron	Barron			US 8 west – Turtle Lake	Southern end of US 8 concurrency
Barron	Barron			US 8 east – Cameron	Northern end of US 8 concurrency
Barron	Stanfold			WIS 48 – Cumberland, Rice Lake	Northern terminus
1.000 mi = 1.609 km; 1.000 km = 0.621 mi: Concurrency terminus
