= Cumberland Airport =

Cumberland Airport may refer to:

- Greater Cumberland Regional Airport serving Cumberland, Maryland, United States (FAA/IATA: CBE)
- Cumberland Municipal Airport (Wisconsin) serving Cumberland, Wisconsin, United States (FAA: UBE)
- Upper Cumberland Regional Airport serving Sparta, Tennessee, United States (FAA: SRB)
- Lake Cumberland Regional Airport serving Somerset, Kentucky, United States (FAA/IATA: SME)
