= Grantsburg Municipal Airport =

Airport in Wisconsin, United States

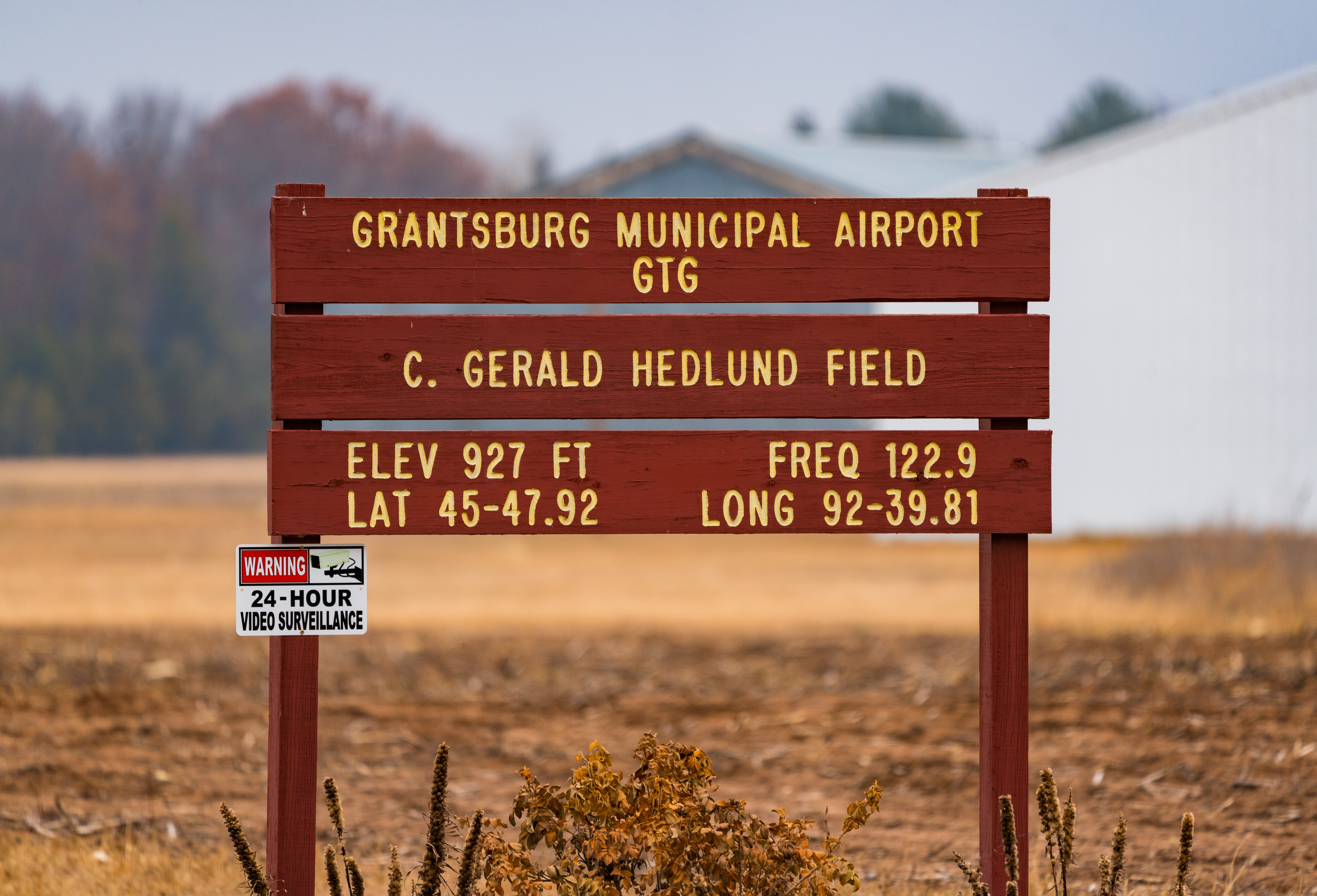
- IATA: GTG; ICAO: KGTG; FAA LID: GTG

Summary
- Airport type: Public
- Owner: Village of Grantsburg
- Serves: Grantsburg, Wisconsin
- Opened: October 1946
- Time zone: CST (UTC−06:00)
  - Summer (DST): CDT (UTC−05:00)
- Elevation AMSL: 927 ft (283 m)
- Coordinates: 45°47′54″N 092°39′52″W

Map
- Location of airport in Wisconsin GTG (the United States)

Runways
Direction	Length		Surface
Direction	ft	m	Surface
12/30	2,999	914	Asphalt
5/23	3,280	1,000	Turf

Statistics
- Aircraft operations (2021): 1,620
- Based aircraft (2024): 13
- Source: Federal Aviation Administration

Grantsburg Municipal Airport (IATA: GTG, ICAO: KGTG, FAA LID: GTG) is a public use airport located two nautical miles (3.7 km) northeast of the central business district of Grantsburg, a village in Burnett County, Wisconsin, United States. It is owned by the Village of Grantsburg.

It is included in the Federal Aviation Administration (FAA) National Plan of Integrated Airport Systems for 2025–2029, in which it is categorized as a basic general aviation facility.

== Facilities and aircraft ==
Grantsburg Municipal Airport covers an area of 280 acres (110 ha) at an elevation of 927 feet (283 m) above mean sea level. It has two runways: 12/30 is 2,999 by 60 feet (914 x 18 m) with an asphalt pavement, and both GPS and VOR/DME approaches; 5/23 is 3,280 by 120 feet (1,000 x 37 m) with a turf surface.

For the 12-month period ending September 23, 2021, the airport had 1,620 aircraft operations, an average of 4 per day: 93% general aviation, 6% air taxi and 1% military.

In July 2024, there were 13 aircraft based at this airport: all 13 single-engine.

== See also ==
- List of airports in Wisconsin
