= Maxville, Wisconsin =

- Town
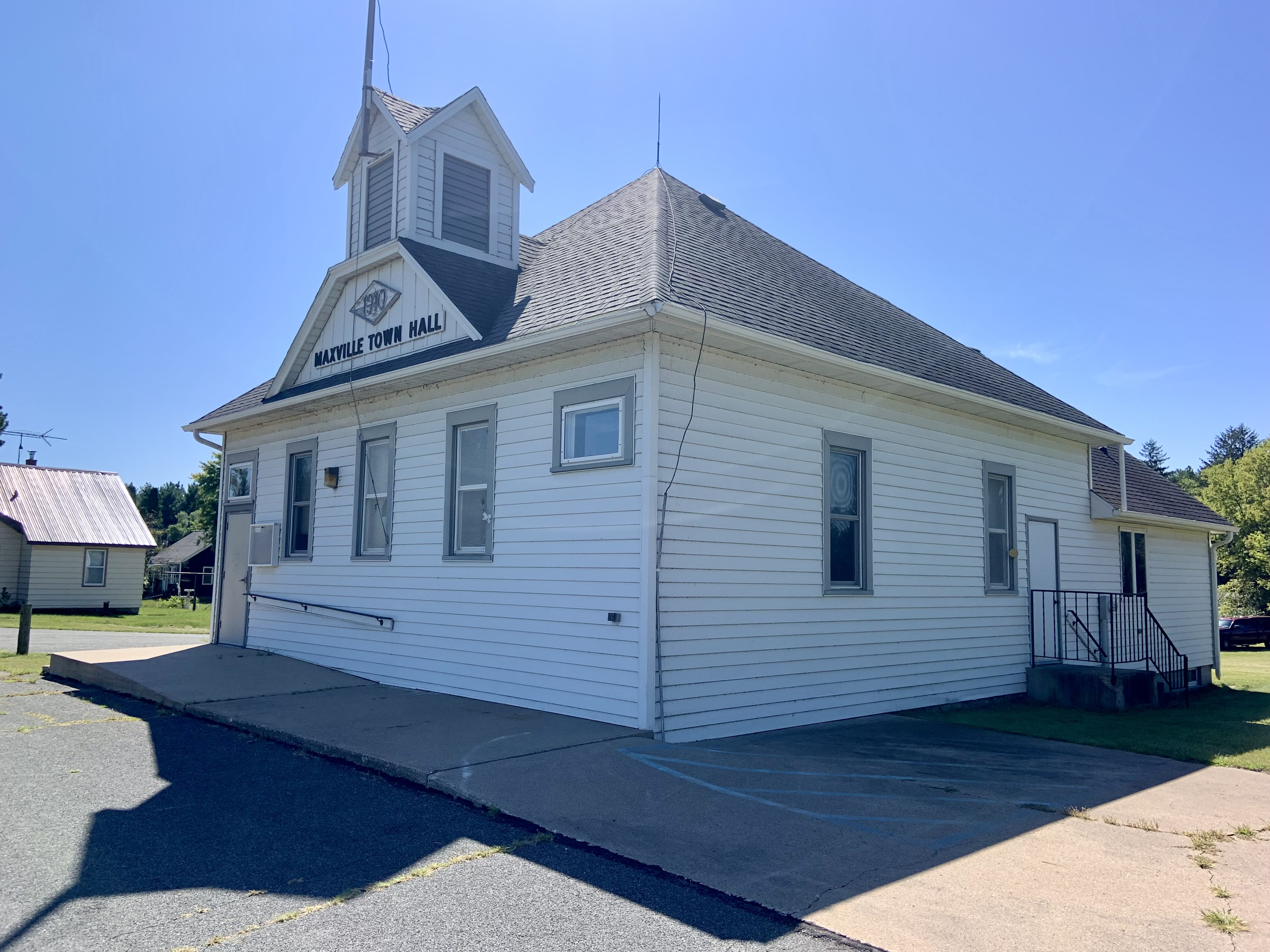
- Town hall

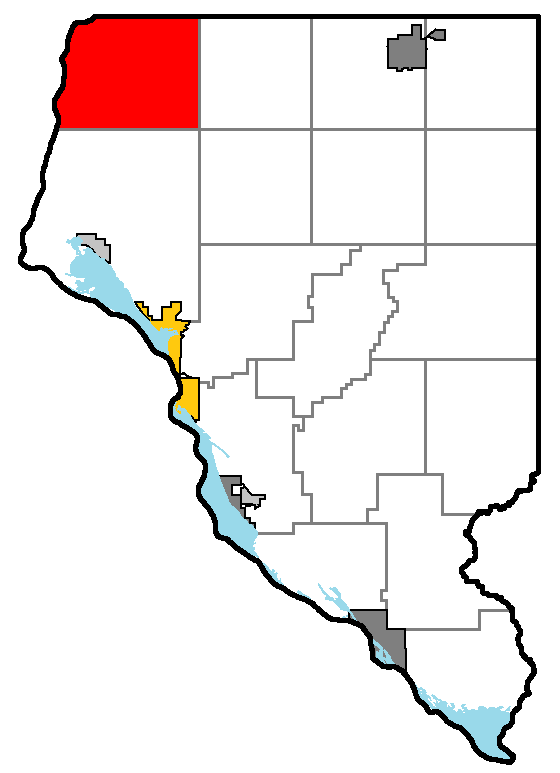
- Location of Maxville, Buffalo County

- Location of Buffalo County, Wisconsin
- Coordinates: 44°34′13″N 91°58′36″W
- Country: United States
- State: Wisconsin
- County: Buffalo

Area
  - Total: 42.7 sq mi (110.7 km^{2})
  - Land: 41.0 sq mi (106.3 km^{2})
  - Water: 1.7 sq mi (4.4 km^{2})
- Elevation: 856 ft (261 m)

Population (2020)
  - Total: 321
  - Density: 7.82/sq mi (3.02/km^{2})
- Time zone: UTC-6 (Central (CST))
  - Summer (DST): UTC-5 (CDT)
- FIPS code: 55-50075
- GNIS feature ID: 1583674
- Website: https://townshipofmaxville.weebly.com/

Maxville is a town in Buffalo County in the U.S. state of Wisconsin. The population was 321 at the 2020 census. The unincorporated community of Maxville, and ghost town of Savoy, are located in the town.

== Geography ==
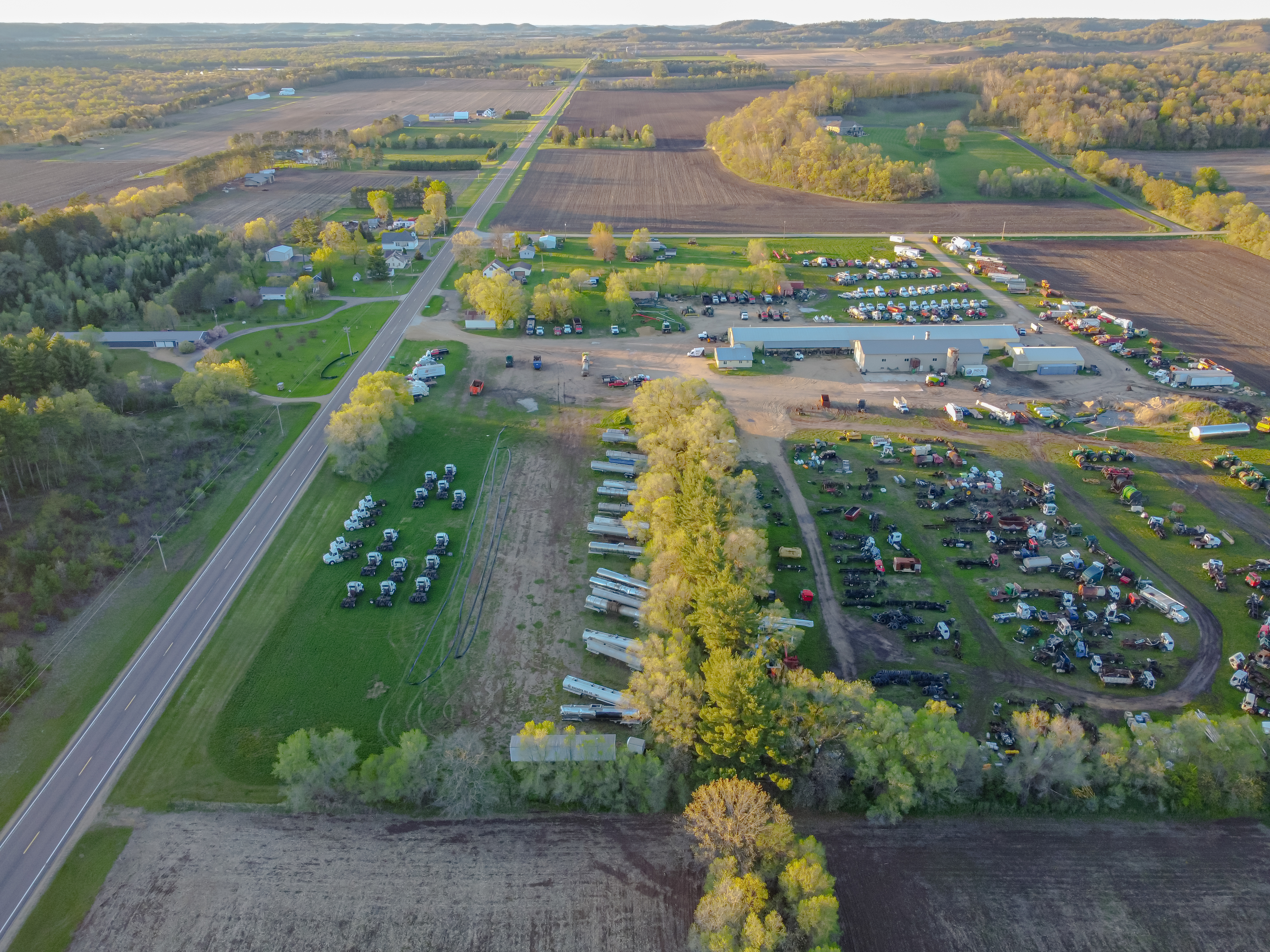

Maxville occupies the northwestern corner of Buffalo County and is bordered by Pepin County to the north and west. The western boundary of the town is formed by the Chippewa River, a tributary of the Mississippi.

According to the United States Census Bureau, the town has a total area of 42.7 square miles (110.7 km^{2}), of which 41.0 square miles (106.3 km^{2}) is land and 1.7 square miles (4.4 km^{2}), or 4.00%, is water.

== Demographics ==
As of the census of 2000, there were 325 people, 115 households, and 89 families residing in the town. The population density was 7.7 people per square mile (3.0/km^{2}). There were 123 housing units at an average density of 2.9 per square mile (1.1/km^{2}). The racial makeup of the town was 99.08% White, 0.31% Asian, and 0.62% from two or more races.

There were 115 households, out of which 44.3% had children under the age of 18 living with them, 64.3% were married couples living together, 8.7% had a female householder with no husband present, and 22.6% were non-families. 20.0% of all households were made up of individuals, and 7.8% had someone living alone who was 65 years of age or older. The average household size was 2.83 and the average family size was 3.19.

In the town, the population was spread out, with 30.2% under the age of 18, 9.5% from 18 to 24, 28.6% from 25 to 44, 23.1% from 45 to 64, and 8.6% who were 65 years of age or older. The median age was 33 years. For every 100 females, there were 107.0 males. For every 100 females age 18 and over, there were 116.2 males.

The median income for a household in the town was $42,813, and the median income for a family was $50,625. Males had a median income of $27,500 versus $21,563 for females. The per capita income for the town was $16,168. About 10.6% of families and 8.3% of the population were below the poverty line, including 4.0% of those under age 18 and 37.0% of those age 65 or over.

== Transportation ==
Wisconsin State Highway 25 runs through the town in a north–south direction.

The Tiffany Bottoms historical railroad runs the length of the town of Maxville, on track formerly owned by the Milwaukee Road. Disused since 1977 due to a derailment, the track rights were leased from Xcel Energy to the Chippewa Valley Motor Car Association in 1995, and subsequently from the Wisconsin DNR since 2021. The company runs limited excursions into the Tiffany Wildlife Area south of Durand and along the Chippewa River.
