= Grantsburg, Wisconsin =

- Village
- Location of Grantsburg in Burnett County, Wisconsin.
- Coordinates: 45°46′49″N 92°44′2″W
- Country: United States
- State: Wisconsin
- County: Burnett

Area
  - Total: 3.02 sq mi (7.82 km^{2})
  - Land: 3.00 sq mi (7.76 km^{2})
  - Water: 0.023 sq mi (0.06 km^{2})
- Elevation: 899 ft (274 m)

Population (2020)
  - Total: 1,330
  - Density: 444/sq mi (171/km^{2})
- Time zone: UTC-6 (Central (CST))
  - Summer (DST): UTC-5 (CDT)
- Area codes: 715 & 534
- FIPS code: 55-30475
- GNIS feature ID: 1565752
- Website: www.villageofgrantsburg.gov

Grantsburg is a village in Burnett County, Wisconsin, United States. The population was 1,330 at the 2020 census. The village is located within the Town of Grantsburg. It was established by Canute Anderson.

== Geography ==
Grantsburg is located at 45°46′49″N 92°41′4″W (45.780541, -92.684718).

According to the United States Census Bureau, the village has a total area of 3.00 square miles (7.77 km^{2}), of which 2.98 square miles (7.72 km^{2}) is land and 0.02 square miles (0.05 km^{2}) is water.

Grantsburg is situated along the Wood River, which is dammed on the western edge of town to form the small body of water named Memory Lake. A playground and campsite have been built here. The Wood River continues west and south to the St. Croix River.

The terrain is generally flat, and the land around Grantsburg is heavily wooded, though there is substantial farm acreage, especially to the east and south. To the north and west, the land is sandy and of marginal agricultural use.

Grantsburg is near Crex Meadows Wildlife Area, the largest wildlife area in Wisconsin. The village has been a Wisconsin Bird City since 2011.

=== Climate ===
Climate data for Grantsburg, Wisconsin, 1991–2020 normals, extremes 1950–present
Month	Jan	Feb	Mar	Apr	May	Jun	Jul	Aug	Sep	Oct	Nov	Dec	Year
Record high °F (°C)	52 (11)	60 (16)	82 (28)	95 (35)	95 (35)	99 (37)	105 (41)	100 (38)	95 (35)	88 (31)	74 (23)	60 (16)	105 (41)
Mean maximum °F (°C)	40.7 (4.8)	47.3 (8.5)	62.9 (17.2)	77.9 (25.5)	87.3 (30.7)	91.8 (33.2)	92.6 (33.7)	91.2 (32.9)	86.9 (30.5)	78.7 (25.9)	60.9 (16.1)	43.9 (6.6)	94.7 (34.8)
Mean daily maximum °F (°C)	22.2 (−5.4)	28.2 (−2.1)	41.1 (5.1)	55.5 (13.1)	69.1 (20.6)	78.1 (25.6)	82.4 (28.0)	80.4 (26.9)	72.3 (22.4)	57.5 (14.2)	40.7 (4.8)	27.2 (−2.7)	54.6 (12.5)
Daily mean °F (°C)	11.7 (−11.3)	16.6 (−8.6)	29.5 (−1.4)	43.1 (6.2)	56.3 (13.5)	65.8 (18.8)	70.2 (21.2)	68.1 (20.1)	59.8 (15.4)	46.3 (7.9)	31.5 (−0.3)	18.4 (−7.6)	43.1 (6.2)
Mean daily minimum °F (°C)	1.2 (−17.1)	5.0 (−15.0)	17.8 (−7.9)	30.7 (−0.7)	43.5 (6.4)	53.4 (11.9)	58.0 (14.4)	55.8 (13.2)	47.3 (8.5)	35.1 (1.7)	22.3 (−5.4)	9.5 (−12.5)	31.6 (−0.2)
Mean minimum °F (°C)	−23.4 (−30.8)	−17.8 (−27.7)	−5.7 (−20.9)	16.6 (−8.6)	29.5 (−1.4)	39.4 (4.1)	47.4 (8.6)	44.7 (7.1)	32.0 (0.0)	21.0 (−6.1)	4.4 (−15.3)	−15.1 (−26.2)	−26.2 (−32.3)
Record low °F (°C)	−44 (−42)	−42 (−41)	−39 (−39)	−2 (−19)	15 (−9)	29 (−2)	36 (2)	32 (0)	21 (−6)	7 (−14)	−24 (−31)	−40 (−40)	−44 (−42)
Average precipitation inches (mm)	0.86 (22)	0.90 (23)	1.58 (40)	2.85 (72)	4.06 (103)	4.45 (113)	4.60 (117)	4.45 (113)	3.67 (93)	3.17 (81)	1.81 (46)	1.37 (35)	33.77 (858)
Average snowfall inches (cm)	10.8 (27)	8.9 (23)	8.4 (21)	3.5 (8.9)	0.1 (0.25)	0.0 (0.0)	0.0 (0.0)	0.0 (0.0)	0.0 (0.0)	0.5 (1.3)	8.1 (21)	11.9 (30)	52.2 (132.45)
Average precipitation days (≥ 0.01 in)	8.3	6.2	7.6	10.6	12.3	13.2	11.4	10.5	10.8	10.8	7.8	9.2	118.7
Average snowy days (≥ 0.1 in)	7.0	5.2	3.9	1.5	0.0	0.0	0.0	0.0	0.0	0.4	4.1	7.5	29.6
Source 1: NOAA
Source 2: National Weather Service

== Demographics ==
Historical population
Census	Pop.	Note	%±
1880	101		—
1890	410		305.9%
1900	612		49.3%
1910	721		17.8%
1920	781		8.3%
1930	777		−0.5%
1940	874		12.5%
1950	931		6.5%
1960	900		−3.3%
1970	930		3.3%
1980	1,153		24.0%
1990	1,144		−0.8%
2000	1,369		19.7%
2010	1,341		−2.0%
2020	1,330		−0.8%
U.S. Decennial Census

=== 2010 census ===
As of the census of 2010, there were 1,341 people, 567 households, and 345 families living in the village. The population density was 450.0 inhabitants per square mile (173.7/km^{2}). There were 636 housing units at an average density of 213.4 per square mile (82.4/km^{2}). The racial makeup of the village was 94.6% (1,268) White, 1.0% (13) African American, 1.3% (17) Native American, 0.5% (7) Asian, 0.1% (1) Pacific Islander, 0.4% (5) from other races, and 2.1% (28) from two or more races. Hispanic or Latino of any race were 1.1% of the population, or 14 people.

There were 567 households, of which 27.5% had children under the age of 18 living with them, 42.7% were married couples living together, 11.5% had a female householder with no husband present, 6.7% had a male householder with no wife present, and 39.2% were non-families. 35.6% of all households were made up of individuals, and 17.1% had someone living alone who was 65 years of age or older. The average household size was 2.28 and the average family size was 2.92.

The median age in the village was 43.1 years. 23.5% of residents were under the age of 18; 8.2% were between the ages of 18 and 24; 20.5% were from 25 to 44; 24.7% were from 45 to 64; and 23% were 65 years of age or older. The gender makeup of the village was 44.7% male and 55.3% female.

=== 2000 census ===
As of the census of 2000, there were 1,369 people, 565 households, and 332 families living in the village. The population density was 459.8 people per square mile (177.4/km^{2}). There were 590 housing units at an average density of 198.1 per square mile (76.4/km^{2}). The racial makeup of the village was 96.06% White, 0.37% Black or African American, 1.83% Native American, 0.22% Asian, 0.80% from other races, and 0.73% from two or more races. 1.17% of the population were Hispanic or Latino of any race.

There were 565 households, out of which 30.8% had children under the age of 18 living with them, 43.7% were married couples living together, 11.5% had a female householder with no husband present, and 41.2% were non-families. 34.7% of all households were made up of individuals, and 18.9% had someone living alone who was 65 years of age or older. The average household size was 2.32 and the average family size was 2.98.

In the village, the population was spread out, with 26.4% under the age of 18, 7.5% from 18 to 24, 24.3% from 25 to 44, 20.8% from 45 to 64, and 21.0% who were 65 years of age or older. The median age was 39 years. For every 100 females, there were 86.5 males. For every 100 females age 18 and over, there were 81.9 males.

The median income for a household in the village was $34,423, and the median income for a family was $40,333. Males had a median income of $32,500 versus $22,500 for females. The per capita income for the village was $16,875. About 7.6% of families and 9.7% of the population were below the poverty line, including 13.9% of those under age 18 and 5.3% of those age 65 or over.

== Transportation ==
Grantsburg Municipal Airport (KGTG) serves the village and surrounding communities.

Grantsburg is along Wisconsin Highway 70, and also Wisconsin Highways 48 / 87 (co-signed).

== Culture ==
Grantsburg held an early snowmobile skipping event in 1977, also known as snowmobile watercross, and continues to host an annual International Watercross Association (IWA) Championship in July.

== Notable people ==
- Anne Carlsen (1915–2002), educator and disability rights advocate
- Leo Chenal (born 2000), linebacker for the Kansas City Chiefs
- Gus Johnson (born 1995), comedian and YouTuber
- Adolphus Peter Nelson (1872–1927), U.S. representative from Wisconsin

== In popular culture ==
Grantsburg was the setting (though not filming location) for the season nine episode of Supernatural, "Sharp Teeth".

== Gallery ==
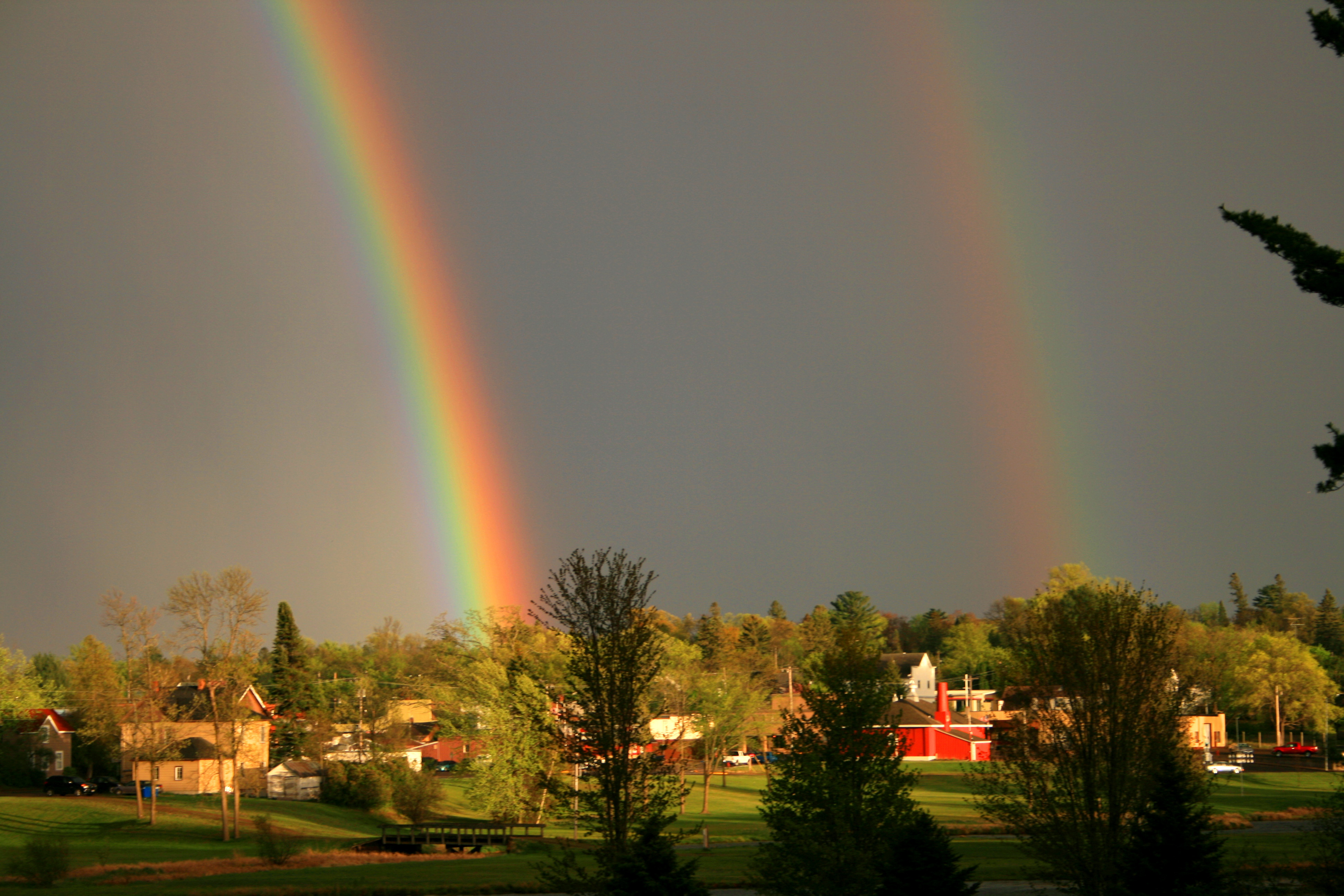
Downtown Grantsburg over Memory Lake

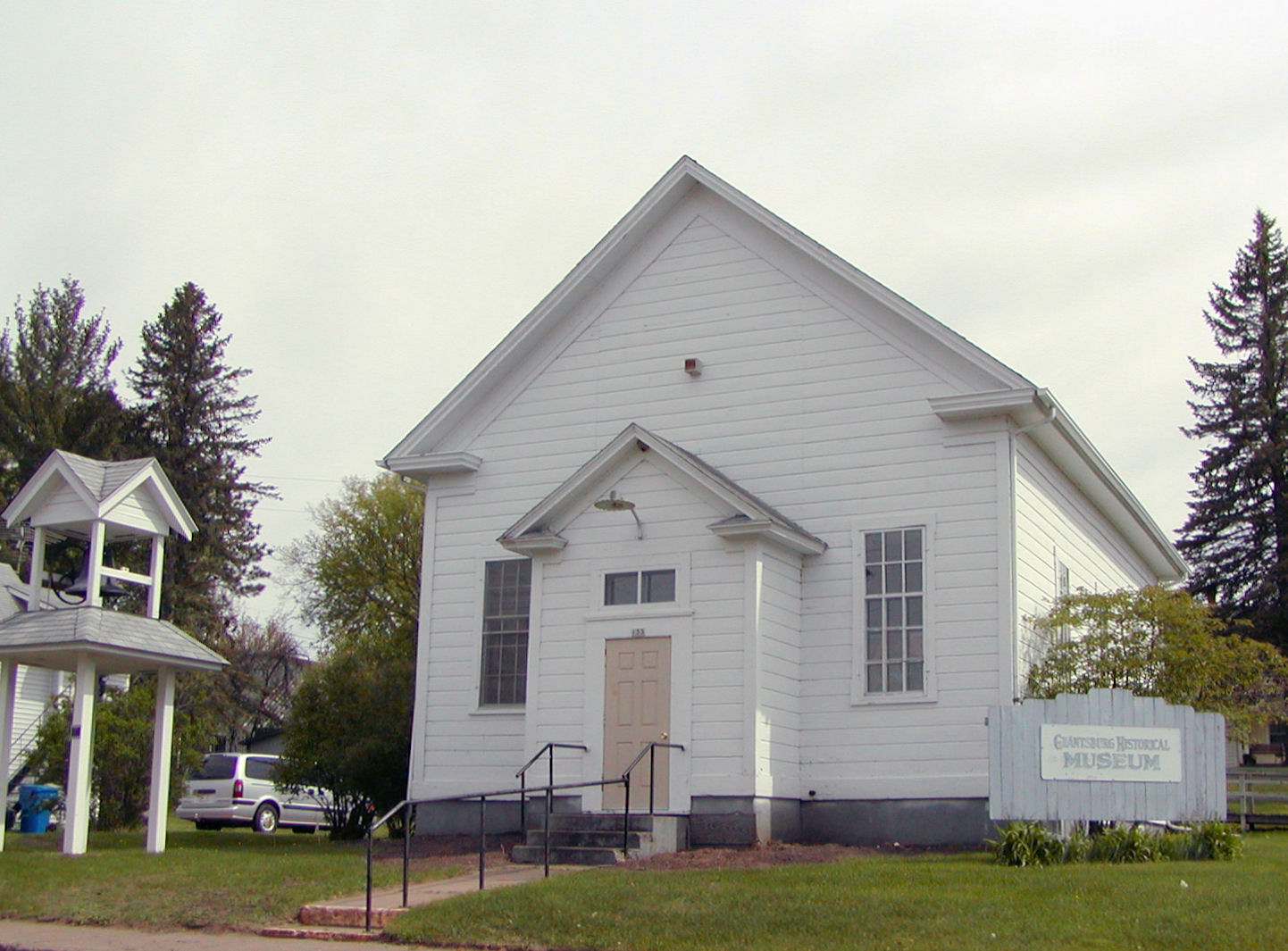
Grantsburg Historical Museum

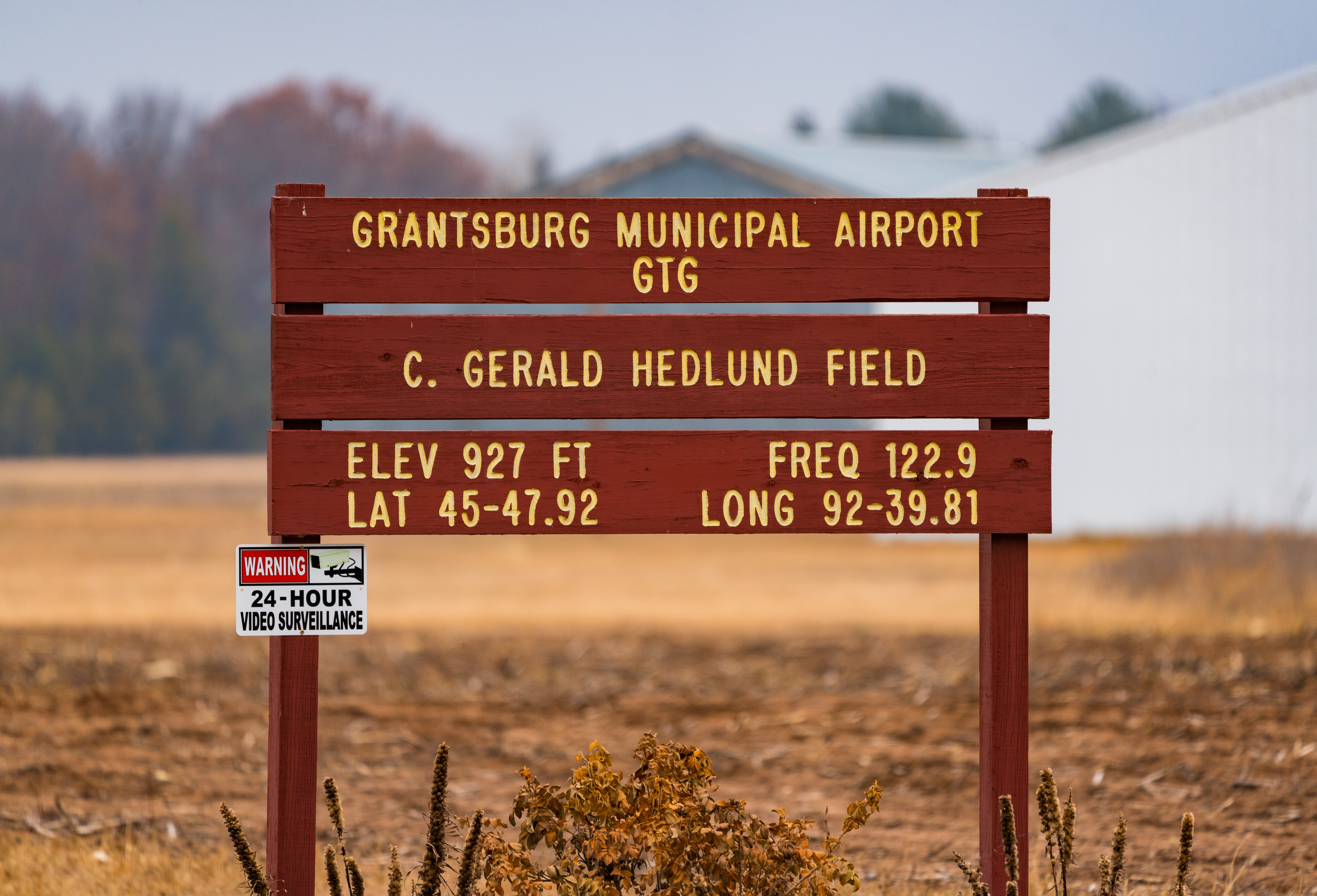
C Gerald Hedlund field at Grantsburg Municipal Airport (GTG)

== See also ==
- List of villages in Wisconsin
