= Henry C. Doolittle =

American politician

Henry Clement Doolittle (July 15, 1850 – August 8, 1926) was a member of the Wisconsin State Assembly.

== Biography ==
Doolittle was born on July 15, 1850, in Princeton, Illinois. He moved to Wisconsin in 1887, settling in Cumberland, Wisconsin. He died in Boise, Idaho.

== Career ==
Doolittle was elected to the Assembly in 1902. Previously, he had served as an alderman, Justice of the Peace, and Supervisor of Cumberland. He was a Republican.
