= Wood River (Wisconsin) =

River in Wisconsin, United States

Coordinates: 45°45′47″N 92°47′06″W

The Wood River is a 47.7-mile-long (76.8 km) tributary of the St. Croix River in western Burnett County, Wisconsin, United States. It follows a meandering course in a generally westward direction. Its banks are mostly low and marshy, though there are high sandbanks in places. Although it flows through a few communities, for most of its course it flows through relatively natural settings.

Its source can be traced to Wood Creek which drains wetlands near the village of Frederic, Wisconsin in Polk County. Wood Creek runs through the unincorporated settlement of Falun, located in the town of Daniels, Burnett County, and eventually empties into Little Wood Lake. Little Wood Lake is drained by the Little Wood River which flows a few miles westward to Big Wood Lake, located in the town of Wood River.

The Wood River proper begins at the north end of Big Wood Lake. It flows north several miles before it arcs back through the village of Grantsburg and on to the St. Croix River, several miles south of State Highway 70.

In the Ojibwe language, this river was called Wiigobimizh-ziibi (Basswood River) because of the abundance of this tree, from which strips of softened inner bark were used as lashings or cording called wiigob. Because of the wetland complex through which the Wood River flows, the Ojibwe called the vicinity of the village of Grantsburg Gichi-Mashkiigiminakaaning (at the great place full of low-bush cranberries).
