= Benson, Wisconsin =

- Unincorporated community
- Location within Wisconsin Location within the United States
- Coordinates: 45°43′02″N 92°51′21″W
- Country: United States
- State: Wisconsin
- County: Burnett
- Town: Anderson
- Elevation: 876 ft (267 m)
- Time zone: UTC-6 (Central (CST))
  - Summer (DST): UTC-5 (CDT)
- Area codes: 715 & 534
- GNIS feature ID: 1577514

Benson is an unincorporated community in the town of Anderson, Burnett County, Wisconsin, United States. The community takes its name from Sven Johann Bengston, a local shopkeeper. A post office with the name of Randall was in operation here from 1885 to 1929.
