= Maple Grove, Barron County, Wisconsin =

The Town of Maple Grove
- Town
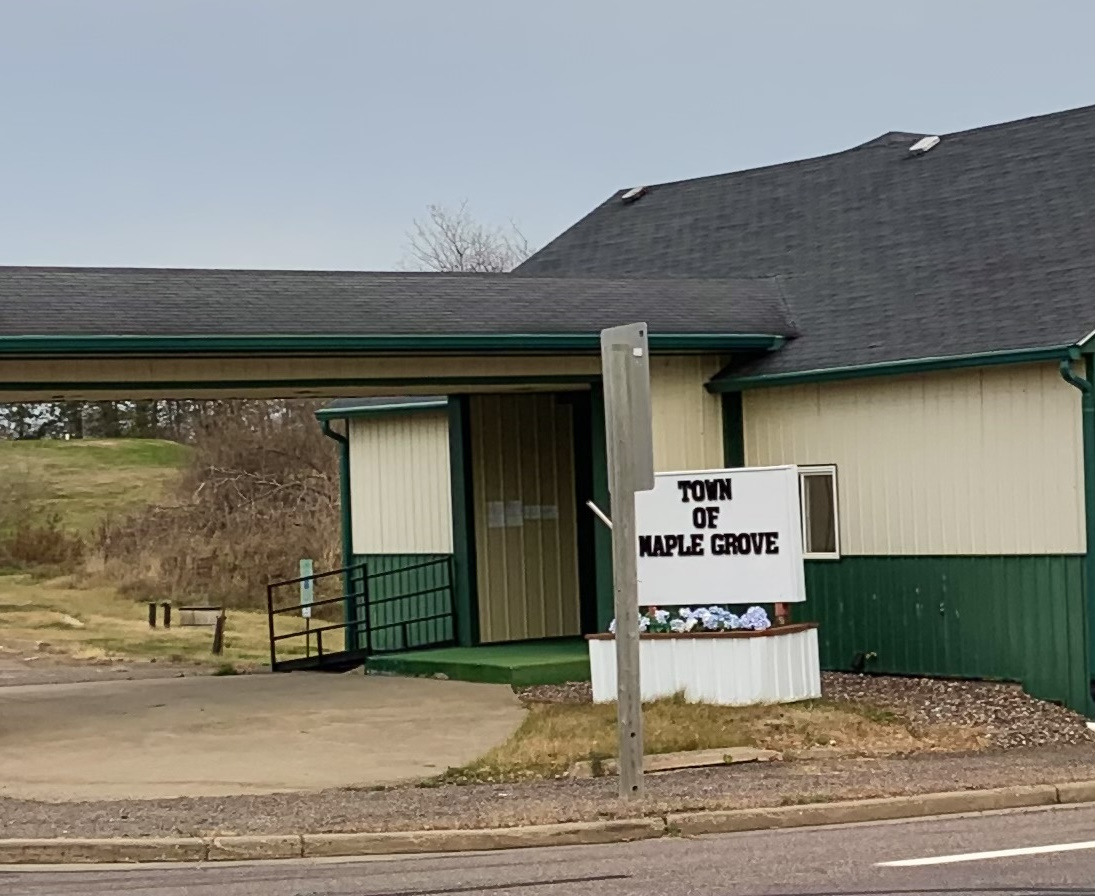
- Town hall in Hillsdale

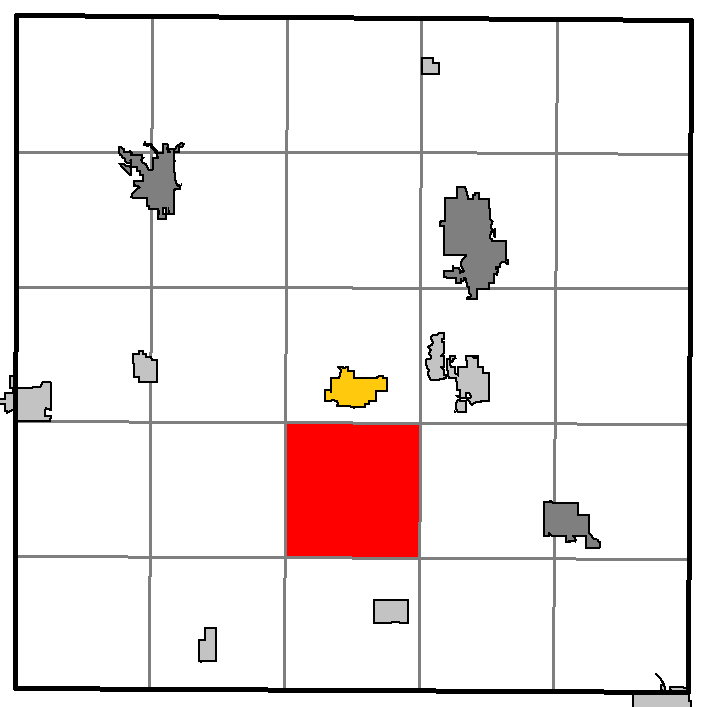
- Location of the Town of Maple Grove, within Barron County, Wisconsin

- Location of Barron County, Wisconsin
- Coordinates: 45°20′31″N 91°50′25″W
- Country: United States
- State: Wisconsin
- County: Barron

Area
  - Total: 35.5 sq mi (91.9 km^{2})
  - Land: 35.5 sq mi (91.9 km^{2})
  - Water: 0 sq mi (0.0 km^{2})
- Elevation: 1,180 ft (360 m)

Population (2020)
  - Total: 877
  - Density: 24.7/sq mi (9.54/km^{2})
- Time zone: UTC-6 (Central (CST))
  - Summer (DST): UTC-5 (CDT)
- Area codes: 715 & 534
- FIPS code: 55-48825
- GNIS feature ID: 1583642

The Town of Maple Grove is located in Barron County in the U.S. state of Wisconsin. The population was 877 at the 2020 census, down from 979 at the 2010 census. The unincorporated community of Hillsdale is located in the town. The unincorporated community of Wickware is also located partially in the town.

== Geography ==
The Town of Maple Grove is located south of the center of Barron County. Wisconsin Highway 25 crosses the center of the town, passing through Hillsdale and connecting it with Barron to the north and Ridgeland to the south.

According to the United States Census Bureau, the town has a total area of 35.5 square miles (91.9 km^{2}), all land.

== Demographics ==
As of the census of 2000, there were 968 people, 323 households, and 267 families residing in the town. The population density was 27.3 people per square mile (10.5/km^{2}). There were 349 housing units at an average density of 9.8 per square mile (3.8/km^{2}). The racial makeup of the town was 97.11% White, 0.10% African American, 0.10% Asian, 0.83% from other races, and 1.86% from two or more races. Hispanic or Latino people of any race were 0.83% of the population.

There were 323 households, out of which 42.7% had children under the age of 18 living with them, 75.5% were married couples living together, 5.0% had a female householder with no husband present, and 17.3% were non-families. 14.6% of all households were made up of individuals, and 5.9% had someone living alone who was 65 years of age or older. The average household size was 2.96 and the average family size was 3.29.

In the town, the population was spread out, with 31.7% under the age of 18, 6.5% from 18 to 24, 28.8% from 25 to 44, 23.5% from 45 to 64, and 9.5% who were 65 years of age or older. The median age was 36 years. For every 100 females, there were 103.8 males. For every 100 females age 18 and over, there were 108.5 males.

The median income for a household in the town was $44,625, and the median income for a family was $47,386. Males had a median income of $28,500 versus $21,607 for females. The per capita income for the town was $15,707. About 5.1% of families and 6.7% of the population were below the poverty line, including 9.9% of those under age 18 and 8.7% of those age 65 or over.
