= Gus Johnson (comedian) =

American comedian (born 1995)

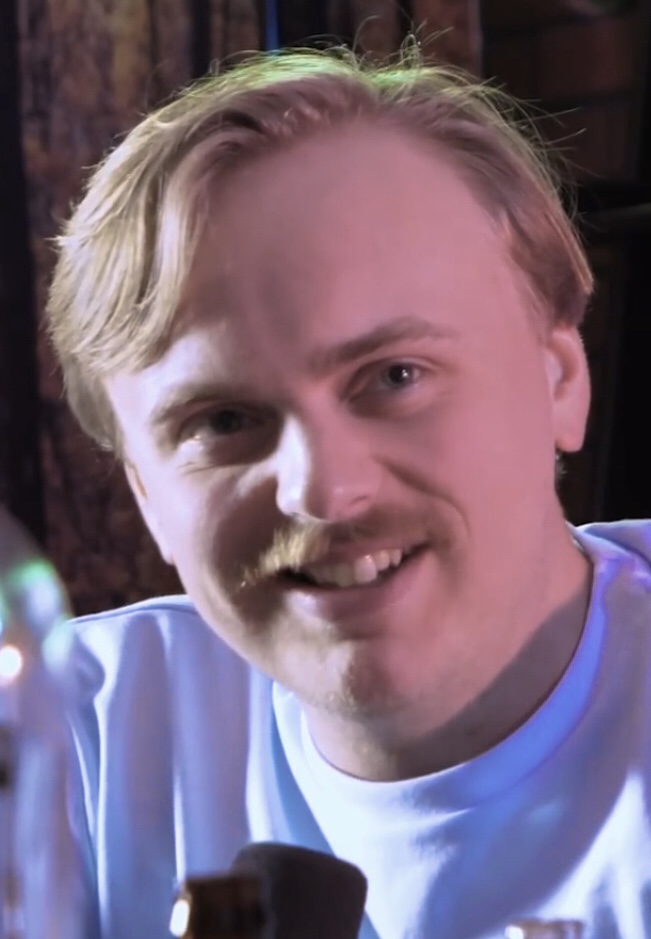
- Johnson in June 2019
- Born: Gustav Emil Johnson; June 20, 1995 (age 31); Grantsburg, Wisconsin, U.S
- Occupations: Comedian; filmmaker; musician; podcaster
- Years active: 2010–present

YouTube information
- Channel: Gus Johnson
- Genres: Comedy; music; commentary
- Subscribers: 2.92 million
- Views: 1.132 billion
- Last updated: April 14, 2026

Gustav Emil Johnson (born June 20, 1995) is an American YouTuber and comedian.

== Early life ==
Gustav Emil Johnson was born in Grantsburg, Wisconsin, on June 20, 1995, the son of Debra and Pete. He is of Norwegian, Danish, and Swedish descent. In middle school, he filmed what he called "stupid sketches that kids would think are funny", sometimes with his younger brother Sven. He was elected governor of Badger Boys State in 2013, and graduated from Grantsburg High School in 2014. He graduated from the University of Wisconsin–Stout with a degree in entertainment design with a focus on digital cinema in May 2018.

== Career ==
Johnson started his YouTube channel in 2010 with his first video, "Ian's Song". He created popular meme videos starring himself and friends. Johnson has released two albums: Lightning Rods and Leaky Roofs and Champagne Seats in 2016.

In late 2017, Johnson began performing longform comedy, using Kickstarter to raise funds for a comedy series about a run-down golf course called "Par 9". Johnson and fellow YouTuber Eddy Burback later moved from the Midwest to Los Angeles and started The Gus & Eddy Podcast.

In January 2019, Johnson was nominated for Best YouTube Comedian at the 11th Shorty Awards. On April 10, 2019, Johnson's YouTube channel reached one million subscribers during his appearance on the H3 Podcast. In 2019, he signed a talent deal with Viacom to create content for Comedy Central.

== Personal life ==
Johnson currently resides in Los Angeles, California.

== Discography ==
=== Studio albums ===
Title	Details
Champagne Seats	Release date: June 24, 2016; Label: Self-released; Formats: Digital download
Lightning Rods & Leaky Roofs (with Joe Dumas)	Release date: December 14, 2018; Label: Self-released; Formats: Digital download

== Awards and nominations ==
Year	Award	Category	Result	Ref.
2021	11th Streamy Awards	Comedy	Nominated	
