= Trade River, Wisconsin =

- Unincorporated community
- Location within the state of Wisconsin
- Coordinates: 45°38′54″N 92°40′21″W
- Country: United States
- State: Wisconsin
- County: Burnett
- Town: Anderson
- Time zone: UTC-6 (Central (CST))
  - Summer (DST): UTC-5 (CDT)
- Area codes: 715 & 534

Trade River is an unincorporated community in the town of Anderson in southwestern Burnett County, in northwestern Wisconsin, United States. The community consists of a church and a few residences.

== Sources ==
Two books produced by a local historical society give the history of the Trade River Valley. The two books have been made fully readable online by the authors.

- Stories of The Trade River Valley
- The Second Book of the Trade River Valley
