= Weirgor, Wisconsin =

- Town
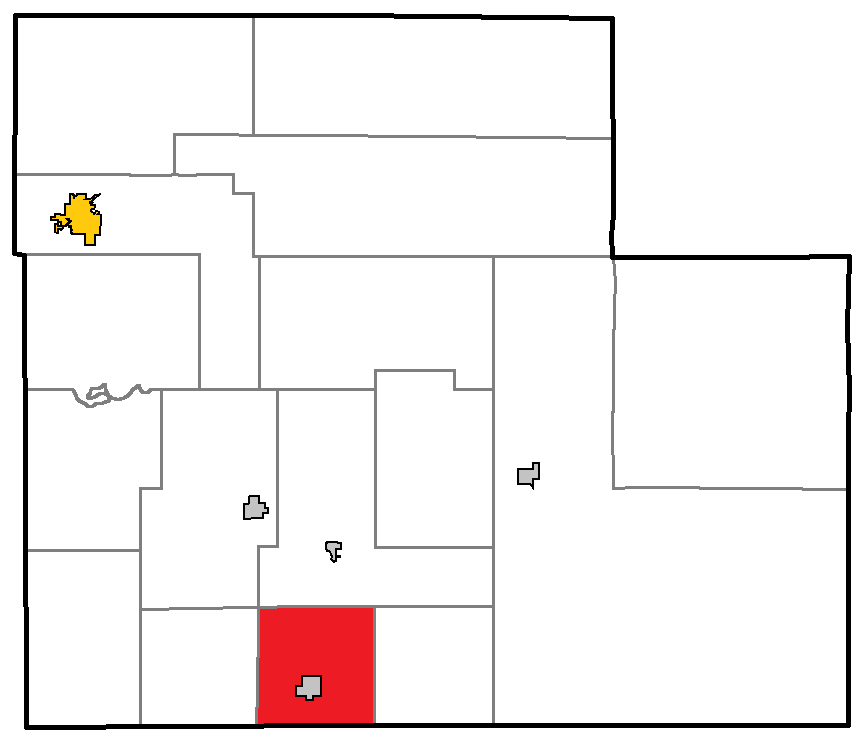
- Location of Weirgor, within Sawyer County
- Coordinates: 45°40′45″N 91°14′56″W
- Country: United States
- State: Wisconsin
- County: Sawyer

Area
  - Total: 34.4 sq mi (89.1 km^{2})
  - Land: 33.5 sq mi (86.8 km^{2})
  - Water: 0.89 sq mi (2.3 km^{2})
- Elevation: 1,210 ft (370 m)

Population (2020)
  - Total: 311
  - Density: 9.28/sq mi (3.58/km^{2})
- Time zone: UTC-6 (Central (CST))
  - Summer (DST): UTC-5 (CDT)
- Area codes: 715 & 534
- FIPS code: 55-85100
- GNIS feature ID: 1584393

Weirgor is a town in Sawyer County, Wisconsin, United States. The population was 311 at the 2020 census.

== Geography ==
According to the United States Census Bureau, the town has a total area of 34.4 square miles (89.1 km^{2}), of which 33.5 square miles (86.8 km^{2}) is land and 0.9 square mile (2.3 km^{2}) (2.59%) is water.

== Demographics ==
As of the census of 2000, there were 370 people, 157 households, and 113 families residing in the town. The population density was 11.0 people per square mile (4.3/km^{2}). There were 243 housing units at an average density of 7.3 per square mile (2.8/km^{2}). The racial makeup of the town was 94.32% White, 2.43% Native American, 1.62% Asian, 0.27% from other races, and 1.35% from two or more races. Hispanic or Latino of any race were 2.43% of the population.

There were 157 households, out of which 21.7% had children under the age of 18 living with them, 61.1% were married couples living together, 6.4% had a female householder with no husband present, and 28.0% were non-families. 24.8% of all households were made up of individuals, and 10.2% had someone living alone who was 65 years of age or older. The average household size was 2.36 and the average family size was 2.79.

In the town, the population was spread out, with 19.7% under the age of 18, 5.4% from 18 to 24, 25.4% from 25 to 44, 29.5% from 45 to 64, and 20.0% who were 65 years of age or older. The median age was 44 years. For every 100 females, there were 110.2 males. For every 100 females age 18 and over, there were 116.8 males.

The median income for a household in the town was $31,875, and the median income for a family was $33,750. Males had a median income of $25,156 versus $23,125 for females. The per capita income for the town was $15,691. About 7.2% of families and 8.5% of the population were below the poverty line, including 6.9% of those under age 18 and 11.9% of those age 65 or over.
