= Prairie Lake, Wisconsin =

- Town
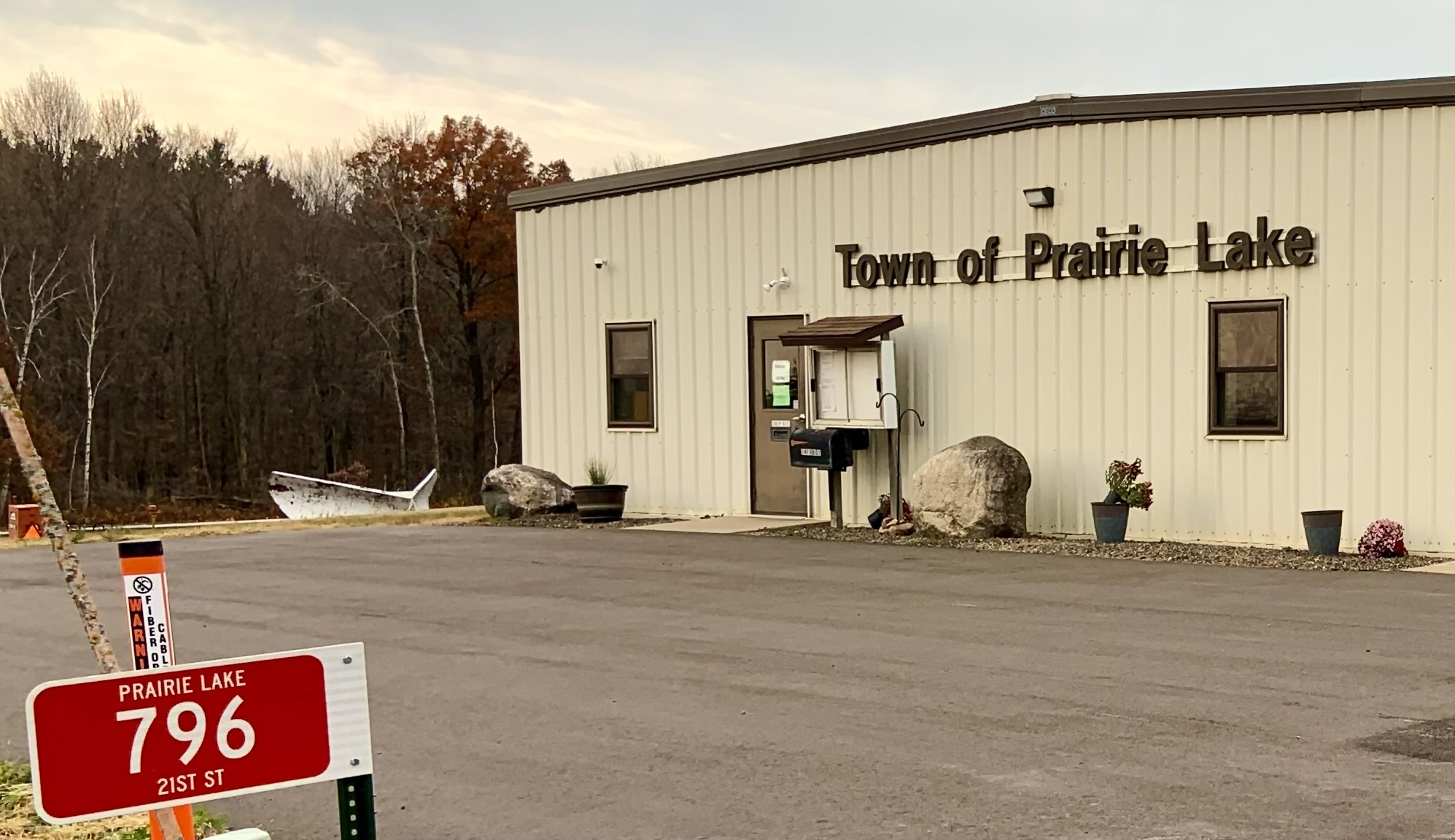
- Town hall

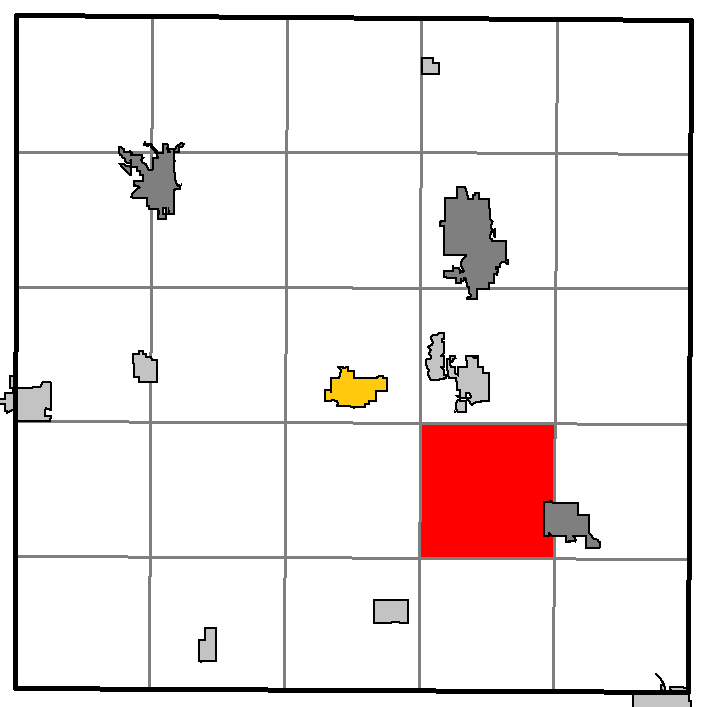
- Location of Prairie Lake, within Barron County, Wisconsin

- Location of Barron County, Wisconsin
- Coordinates: 45°20′46″N 91°42′54″W
- Country: United States
- State: Wisconsin
- County: Barron

Area
  - Total: 34.9 sq mi (90.5 km^{2})
  - Land: 33.2 sq mi (85.9 km^{2})
  - Water: 1.8 sq mi (4.6 km^{2})
- Elevation: 1,099 ft (335 m)

Population (2020)
  - Total: 1,648
  - Density: 49.7/sq mi (19.2/km^{2})
- Time zone: UTC-6 (Central (CST))
  - Summer (DST): UTC-5 (CDT)
- Area codes: 715 & 534
- FIPS code: 55-65200
- GNIS feature ID: 1583977
- PLSS township: T33N R11W
- Website: townofprairielake.gov

Prairie Lake is a town in Barron County in the U.S. state of Wisconsin. The population was 1,648 at the 2020 census, up from 1,532 at the 2010 census. The unincorporated community of Wickware is located partially in the town.

== History ==
Some of the early European Americans to walk the six mile square that would become Prairie Lake were the U.S. government's surveyors. In 1852 they surveyed the outline of the township on foot with chain and compass. Then others returned in 1854 to survey all the section lines. When done, the deputy surveyor filed this general description:

This Township the Surface of which is mostly level or slightly rolling contains Several Tamarac Swamps Some of which are of considerable extent and all unfit for cultivation. The Soil is principally 3rd rate being of a very Sandy barren nature producing but little vegeta?. The Timber on the North and East Part of the Township consists of Black Yellow and White Pine. The White Pine is mostly of good quality and valuable for lumber. The SW part of the Township is Timbered principally with Burr Oak Sugar Aspen Red Oak Elm Linden White Pine and Ironwood. The west part of the Township is well watered by numerous Small Streams of pure water which flow in an Easterly direction until they lose themselves in Red Cedar river which enters the Township in Section 2 and runs in a Southerly direction until it leaves the Township in Section 34. The banks of the river are generally high water Clear(?) and pure. There is also a Stream Called Vermilion river which Enters The Township in Section 6 and runs in a SE direction until it Empties into Red Cedar river in Section 8. There is also a Lake Situated in Sections 1 2 3 11 12 and 13. This Lake produces wild Rice very abundantly which is gathered annually by the Indians and by them very highly prized as an article of food. There are no Settlers in the Township.

== Geography ==
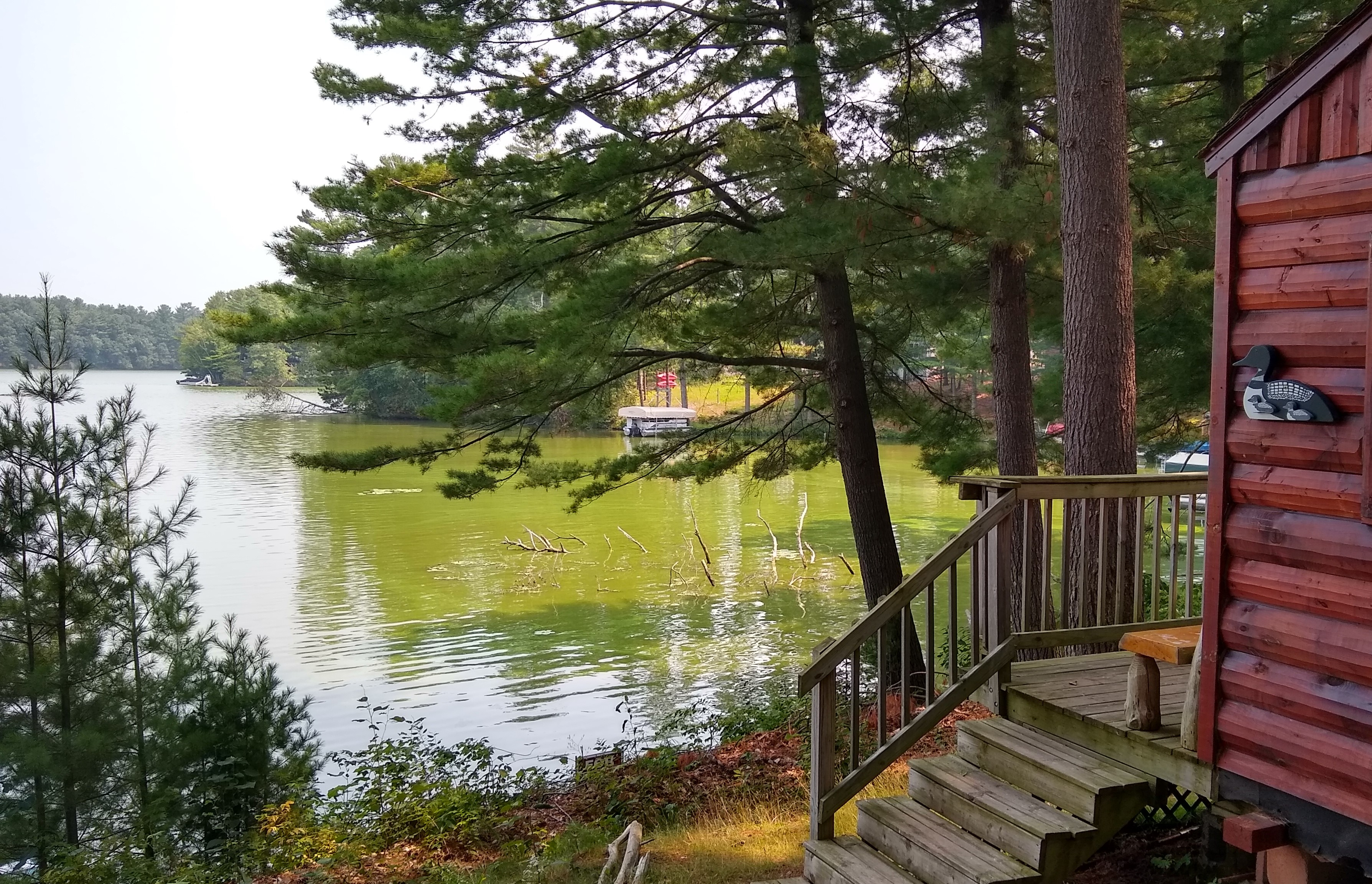
The lake for which the town is named is ringed with cottages. August, with algae in bloom.

The town of Prairie Lake is located southeast of the center of Barron County. Its namesake lake runs from northwest to southeast across the northeastern corner of the town and extends north into the town of Stanley and southeast into the city of Chetek, where it becomes Lake Chetek. The Red Cedar River, a tributary of the Chippewa River, flows across the center of the town roughly parallel to and 2 miles (3 km) west of Prairie Lake.

U.S. Route 53, a four-lane expressway, crosses the town from northwest to southeast on land that is between the lake and the Red Cedar River. There are no exits within the town; the nearest access points are Exit 126 in Chetek and Exit 135 in Cameron.

According to the United States Census Bureau, the town has a total area of 34.9 square miles (90.5 km^{2}), of which 33.2 square miles (85.9 km^{2}) is land and 1.8 square miles (4.6 km^{2}), or 5.11%, is water.

== Demographics ==
As of the census of 2000, there were 1,369 people, 528 households, and 412 families residing in the town. The population density was 41.3 people per square mile (16/km^{2}). There were 739 housing units at an average density of 22.3 per square mile (8.6/km^{2}). The racial makeup of the town was 99.27% White, 0.22% Native American, 0.15% Asian, 0.07% from other races, and 0.29% from two or more races. Hispanic or Latino people of any race were 0.44% of the population.

There were 528 households, out of which 34.1% had children under the age of 18 living with them, 68.8% were married couples living together, 4.5% had a female householder with no husband present, and 21.8% were non-families. 18.4% of all households were made up of individuals, and 7.6% had someone living alone who was 65 years of age or older. The average household size was 2.59 and the average family size was 2.92.

In the town, the population was spread out, with 25.4% under the age of 18, 5.9% from 18 to 24, 27.1% from 25 to 44, 26.6% from 45 to 64, and 15% who were 65 years of age or older. The median age was 40 years. For every 100 females, there were 101 males. For every 100 females age 18 and over, there were 101.8 males.

The median income for a household in the town was $40,048, and the median income for a family was $43,750. Males had a median income of $31,000 versus $21,164 for females. The per capita income for the town was $17,507. About 7.6% of families and 8.8% of the population were below the poverty line, including 11.4% of those under age 18 and 12.2% of those age 65 or over.
