= Wickware, Wisconsin =

- Unincorporated community
- Location within Wisconsin Location within the United States
- Coordinates: 45°21′05″N 91°47′11″W
- Country: United States
- State: Wisconsin
- County: Barron
- Towns: Maple Grove, Prairie Lake
- Elevation: 1,201 ft (366 m)
- Time zone: UTC-6 (Central (CST))
  - Summer (DST): UTC-5 (CDT)
- Area codes: 715 and 534
- GNIS feature ID: 1576713

Wickware is an unincorporated community located in the towns of Maple Grove and Prairie Lake, in Barron County, Wisconsin, United States.
