= Cumberland Municipal Airport (Wisconsin) =

Airport in Cumberland, Wisconsin, United States of America

- IATA: none; ICAO: KUBE; FAA LID: UBE

Summary
- Airport type: Public
- Owner: City of Cumberland
- Serves: Cumberland, Wisconsin
- Opened: October 1946
- Time zone: CST (UTC−06:00)
  - Summer (DST): CDT (UTC−05:00)
- Elevation AMSL: 1,243 ft (379 m)
- Coordinates: 45°30′22″N 091°58′51″W

Map
- Location of airport in Wisconsin UBE (the United States)

Runways
Direction	Length		Surface
Direction	ft	m	Surface
9/27	4,043	1,232	Asphalt
18/36	1,996	608	Turf

Statistics
- Aircraft operations (2023): 10,900
- Based aircraft (2024): 27
- Source: Federal Aviation Administration

Cumberland Municipal Airport (ICAO: KUBE, FAA LID: UBE) is a city owned public use airport located three nautical miles (6 km) southeast of the central business district of Cumberland, a city in Barron County, Wisconsin, United States.

It is included in the Federal Aviation Administration (FAA) National Plan of Integrated Airport Systems for 2025–2029, in which it is categorized as a local general aviation facility.

Although most U.S. airports use the same three-letter location identifier for the FAA and IATA, this airport is assigned UBE by the FAA but has no designation from the IATA.

== Facilities and aircraft ==
Cumberland Municipal Airport covers an area of 160 acres (65 ha) at an elevation of 1,243 feet (379 m) above mean sea level. It has two runways: 9/27 is 4,043 by 75 feet (1,232 x 23 m) with an asphalt pavement and 18/36 is 1,996 by 120 feet (608 x 37 m) with a turf surface.

For the 12-month period ending July 3, 2023, the airport had 10,900 general aviation aircraft operations, an average of 30 per day. In August 2024, there were 27 aircraft based at this airport: all 27 single-engine.

== See also ==
- List of airports in Wisconsin
