= Anderson, Burnett County, Wisconsin =

Anderson, Wisconsin
- Town
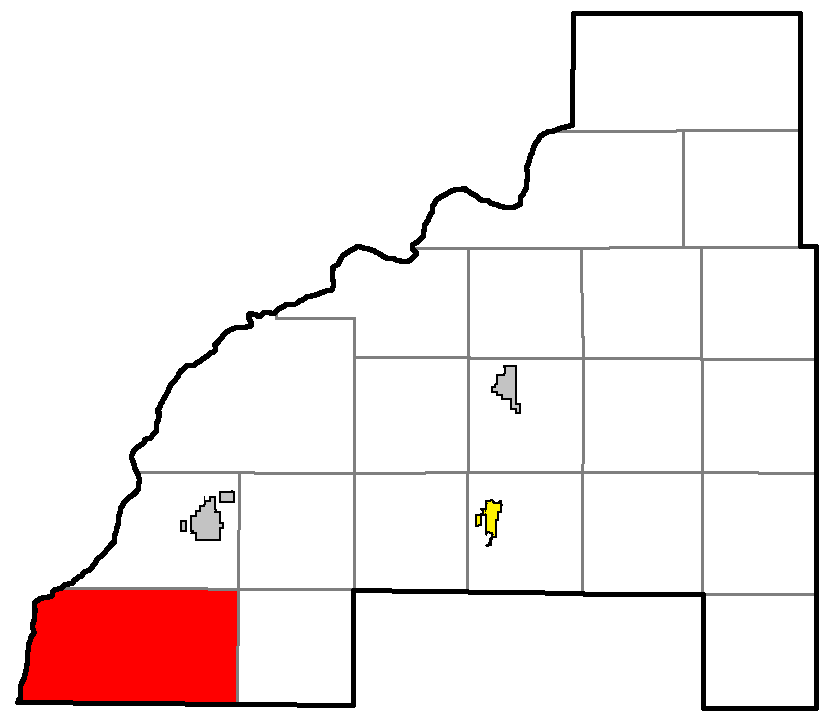
- Location of Anderson, within Burnett County
- Coordinates: 45°40′49″N 92°44′39″W
- Country: United States
- State: Wisconsin
- County: Burnett

Area
  - Total: 64.0 sq mi (165.7 km^{2})
  - Land: 62.8 sq mi (162.7 km^{2})
  - Water: 1.2 sq mi (3.1 km^{2})
- Elevation: 896 ft (273 m)

Population (2020)
  - Total: 408
  - Density: 6.49/sq mi (2.51/km^{2})
- Time zone: UTC-6 (Central (CST))
  - Summer (DST): UTC-5 (CDT)
- Area codes: 715 & 534
- FIPS code: 55-01900
- GNIS feature ID: 1582693
- Website: townofanderson.org

Anderson is a town in Burnett County in the U.S. state of Wisconsin. The population was 408 at the 2020 census. The unincorporated communities of Benson, Randall, and Trade River are located within the town.

== History ==
Anderson was named after early settler and Wisconsin State Assembly member Canute Anderson.

== Geography ==
Anderson occupies the southwestern corner of Burnett County. Its western border is the St. Croix River, with Chisago County, Minnesota, on the opposite shore. Polk County is to the south. The Saint Croix National Scenic Riverway occupies a strip of land along the town's western border, and Fish Lake State Wildlife Area occupies most of the northeastern quarter of the town.

According to the United States Census Bureau, the town has a total area of 64.0 square miles (165.7 km^{2}), of which 62.8 square miles (162.7 km^{2}) is land and 1.2 square miles (3.1 km^{2}), or 1.84%, is water.

== Demographics ==
As of the census of 2000, there were 372 people, 154 households, and 105 families residing in the town. The population density was 5.9 people per square mile (2.3/km^{2}). There were 265 housing units at an average density of 4.2 per square mile (1.6/km^{2}). The racial makeup of the town was 99.46% White, 0.27% Native American, and 0.27% from two or more races.

There were 154 households, out of which 36.4% had children under the age of 18 living with them, 59.7% were married couples living together, 3.9% had a female householder with no husband present, and 31.2% were non-families. 25.3% of all households were made up of individuals, and 7.8% had someone living alone who was 65 years of age or older. The average household size was 2.42 and the average family size was 2.94.

In the town, the population was spread out, with 26.3% under the age of 18, 3.8% from 18 to 24, 28.5% from 25 to 44, 27.4% from 45 to 64, and 14.0% who were 65 years of age or older. The median age was 41 years. For every 100 females, there were 115.0 males. For every 100 females age 18 and over, there were 114.1 males.

The median income for a household in the town was $31,818, and the median income for a family was $40,893. Males had a median income of $31,111 versus $20,982 for females. The per capita income for the town was $17,013. About 3.3% of families and 7.7% of the population were below the poverty line, including none of those under age 18 and 7.7% of those age 65 or over.
