= Cumberland, Wisconsin =

- City
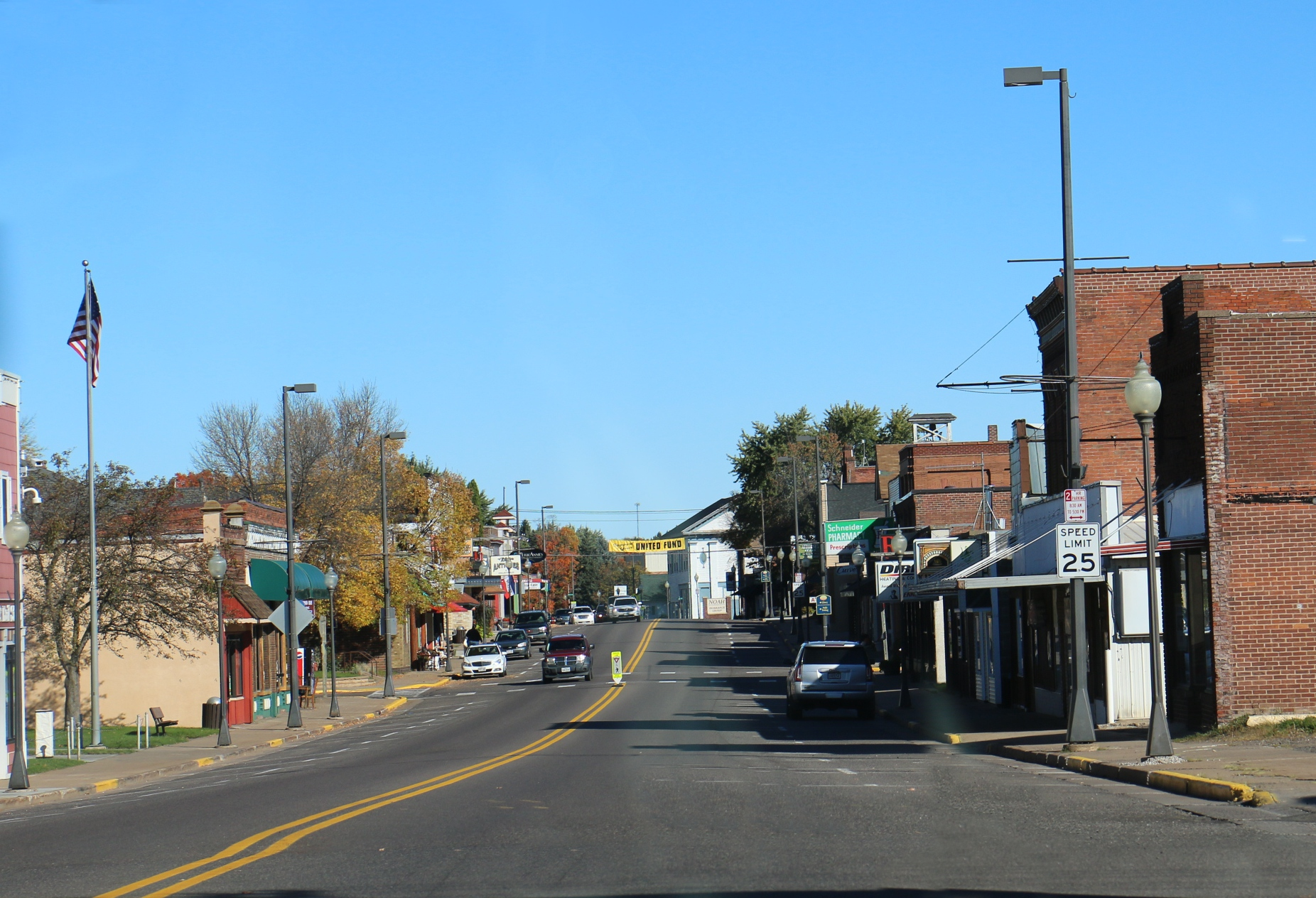
- Downtown Cumberland
- Nicknames: Wisconsin's Island City, or C-Town
- Location of Cumberland in Barron County, Wisconsin

- Location within Wisconsin Location within the United States
- Coordinates: 45°32′9″N 92°1′24″W
- Country: United States
- State: Wisconsin
- County: Barron

Area
  - Total: 4.57 sq mi (11.83 km^{2})
  - Land: 3.98 sq mi (10.32 km^{2})
  - Water: 0.58 sq mi (1.51 km^{2})
- Elevation: 1,243 ft (379 m)

Population (2020)
  - Total: 2,274
  - Density: 570.7/sq mi (220.3/km^{2})
- Time zone: UTC-6 (Central (CST))
  - Summer (DST): UTC-5 (CDT)
- Postal code: 54829
- Area codes: 715 & 534
- FIPS code: 55-18025
- GNIS feature ID: 1563618
- Website: https://www.cityofcumberland.net/

Cumberland is a city in Barron County, Wisconsin, United States. The population was 2,274 at the 2020 census. The city is partially within the Town of Cumberland. It was incorporated in 1885.

== History ==
Cumberland is often called the "Island City". The main part of the city, including the original settlement, is on land surrounded by Beaver Dam Lake, originally settled by the Ojibwe, whose name for it is Che-wa-cum-ma-towangok ("Lake Made by the Beavers"). Ojibwe Chief Pon-gee Rau-gen ("Little Pipe") lived in the area even after it was settled by European settlers, and drowned in a canoe on Beaver Dam Lake in 1895.

In 1874, A. Ritan and R. H. Clothier explored the area with the intention of settling there. While exploring, they came across surveyors who informed them of the railroad line the North Wisconsin Railway Company planned to lay in the area. Ritan, who lived near what is today Turtle Lake, and the Norwegian-American Dahlby family, from New Richmond, both filed a homestead near the proposed railroad and built two log cabins 300 feet north of the present high school.

In 1878, the North Wisconsin Railroad Company extended rail lines through the area. Before that, settlers got provisions in Rice Lake, Barron or Clayton. In 1880, the Dahlbys sold their cabin, moved to Chandler (now known as Spooner), and opened a store. Ritan, also originally from Norway, lived in Cumberland for many years and helped develop it before moving to Portland, Oregon.

Clothier also took a homestead and built a farm in 1875.

On December 30, 1875, the town of Lakeside was organized, encompassing what is now Lakeland Township, Almena Township, Crystal Lake Township and Maple Plain Township. During the winter of 1876, Bonett Bridge was built off the island. Soon a school was built on the mainland area near the bridge with Ida Schofield as the teacher. She was soon replaced by Carrie Fay, who arrived from nearby Prairie Farm. On January 1, 1880, the name was changed to Cumberland at the request of John Humbird, who arrived in the area from Cumberland, Maryland. Almena Township joined Turtle Lake Township a few months later, and on November 12, 1902, Crystal Lake became its own township. In early 1876 a post office, originally called Lakeland, was established three miles east of the city, with L. I. Gunderson as postmaster. On September 10, 1876, Mae Jenet Hodgkin became the first white person born on the island. David Ingle opened the first grocery store, and Elmer Wisner of Clear Lake opened the first blacksmith shop in 1878. In the winter of 1879 the name was changed to Cumberland. In July 1880, Dr. William Hopkins arrived from Maine and set up a practice. At the time, it was the only practice between Clear Lake and Lake Superior. Also around this time, a steam sawmill was set up in northern Cumberland, in what is now the "Mill Hill" area. It operated for a few years until burning down on August 15, 1884. The Lakeside Cemetery was established in 1880. In 1881, the first newspaper, the Cumberland Herald (later the Cumberland Advocate) began printing. The first bank, the Bank of Cumberland, began operation on October 8, 1883.

After the railroad arrived, settlers soon followed, and by 1884 there were 24 saloons in the area. In 1885 a jail and fire department, with N. D. Richards as fire chief, were established. By the late 1880s the first hotel was kept by Jack Collingwood; several more hotels followed. Soon the Elm Street Bridge was completed and the fire department moved from Lake Street to its present location. In February 1893, the state board of health sent a representative to set up a quarantine on the Italian settlement due to unsanitary conditions. On August 1, 1884, the city borrowed $5,900 via bond issue to establish a system of waterworks constructed by Fairbanks, Morse and Company in February 1895. In April 1895, telephone lines were erected in the city limits. On September 14, 1895, the newly built water tank burst and damaged several nearby properties. On November 20, 1897, the city approved a resolution for street lighting of all public grounds by electricity. In 1903 the Uecke's Opera House was opened. The same year, a large school was constructed on the island where Cumberland Elementary School now stands. On March 15, 1905, a $10,000 donation from Andrew Carnegie established a Carnegie Library in Cumberland. In 1914, Dr. George Grinde created the Island City Hospital, including 20 beds and X-ray facilities.

== Geography ==
Cumberland is located at 45°32′9″N 92°1′24″W (45.535892, −92.023389), along Beaver Dam Lake at the beginning of the Hay River.

According to the United States Census Bureau, the city has an area of 4.04 square miles (10.46 km^{2}), of which 3.45 square miles (8.94 km^{2}) is land and 0.59 square miles (1.53 km^{2}) is water.

Cumberland is along U.S. Highway 63 and Wisconsin Highway 48.

=== Climate ===
Climate data for Cumberland, Wisconsin, 1991–2020 normals, extremes 1932–present
Month	Jan	Feb	Mar	Apr	May	Jun	Jul	Aug	Sep	Oct	Nov	Dec	Year
Record high °F (°C)	54 (12)	57 (14)	80 (27)	92 (33)	104 (40)	98 (37)	107 (42)	101 (38)	95 (35)	88 (31)	74 (23)	60 (16)	107 (42)
Mean maximum °F (°C)	38.9 (3.8)	44.4 (6.9)	59.2 (15.1)	74.6 (23.7)	82.6 (28.1)	88.9 (31.6)	89.7 (32.1)	89.2 (31.8)	84.5 (29.2)	75.9 (24.4)	58.7 (14.8)	43.1 (6.2)	91.8 (33.2)
Mean daily maximum °F (°C)	19.1 (−7.2)	24.3 (−4.3)	37.1 (2.8)	51.6 (10.9)	64.7 (18.2)	74.7 (23.7)	79.0 (26.1)	76.9 (24.9)	68.5 (20.3)	54.0 (12.2)	38.0 (3.3)	24.3 (−4.3)	51.0 (10.6)
Daily mean °F (°C)	9.7 (−12.4)	13.5 (−10.3)	26.3 (−3.2)	41.0 (5.0)	54.4 (12.4)	64.8 (18.2)	69.2 (20.7)	67.1 (19.5)	58.3 (14.6)	44.5 (6.9)	30.0 (−1.1)	16.5 (−8.6)	41.3 (5.1)
Mean daily minimum °F (°C)	0.3 (−17.6)	2.7 (−16.3)	15.5 (−9.2)	30.4 (−0.9)	44.0 (6.7)	54.9 (12.7)	59.4 (15.2)	57.3 (14.1)	48.1 (8.9)	35.1 (1.7)	22.0 (−5.6)	8.7 (−12.9)	31.5 (−0.3)
Mean minimum °F (°C)	−19.8 (−28.8)	−17.1 (−27.3)	−7.3 (−21.8)	16.9 (−8.4)	33.0 (0.6)	43.1 (6.2)	50.4 (10.2)	49.1 (9.5)	35.1 (1.7)	24.2 (−4.3)	7.0 (−13.9)	−11.9 (−24.4)	−22.3 (−30.2)
Record low °F (°C)	−43 (−42)	−52 (−47)	−37 (−38)	−4 (−20)	18 (−8)	31 (−1)	36 (2)	30 (−1)	19 (−7)	6 (−14)	−16 (−27)	−39 (−39)	−52 (−47)
Average precipitation inches (mm)	0.95 (24)	0.99 (25)	1.69 (43)	2.83 (72)	3.84 (98)	4.54 (115)	4.47 (114)	4.40 (112)	3.61 (92)	3.28 (83)	1.86 (47)	1.29 (33)	33.75 (858)
Average snowfall inches (cm)	11.4 (29)	10.6 (27)	9.2 (23)	4.6 (12)	0.4 (1.0)	0.0 (0.0)	0.0 (0.0)	0.0 (0.0)	0.0 (0.0)	0.7 (1.8)	7.1 (18)	11.6 (29)	55.6 (140.8)
Average precipitation days (≥ 0.01 in)	8.6	6.3	7.1	10.4	11.0	11.3	10.0	10.0	9.6	10.2	7.9	8.8	111.2
Average snowy days (≥ 0.1 in)	7.8	5.5	4.0	2.0	0.1	0.0	0.0	0.0	0.0	0.6	3.5	7.3	30.8
Source 1: NOAA
Source 2: National Weather Service

== Demographics ==
Historical population
Census	Pop.	Note	%±
1880	246		—
1890	1,219		395.5%
1900	1,328		8.9%
1910	1,445		8.8%
1920	1,528		5.7%
1930	1,532		0.3%
1940	1,539		0.5%
1950	1,872		21.6%
1960	1,860		−0.6%
1970	1,839		−1.1%
1980	1,983		7.8%
1990	2,163		9.1%
2000	2,280		5.4%
2010	2,170		−4.8%
2020	2,274		4.8%
U.S. Decennial Census

=== 2010 census ===
As of the census of 2010, there were 2,170 people, 994 households, and 570 families residing in the city. The population density was 629.0 inhabitants per square mile (242.9/km^{2}). There were 1,207 housing units at an average density of 349.9 per square mile (135.1/km^{2}). The racial makeup of the city was 95.9% White, 0.5% African American, 1.4% Native American, 0.4% from other races, and 1.7% from two or more races. Hispanic or Latino people of any race were 2.5% of the population.

There were 994 households, of which 23.9% had children under the age of 18 living with them, 41.0% were married couples living together, 12.2% had a female householder with no husband present, 4.1% had a male householder with no wife present, and 42.7% were non-families. 36.3% of all households were made up of individuals, and 20.5% had someone living alone who was 65 years of age or older. The average household size was 2.14 and the average family size was 2.76.

The median age in the city was 47.2 years. 20.8% of residents were under the age of 18; 7.4% were between the ages of 18 and 24; 19.8% were from 25 to 44; 27% were from 45 to 64; and 24.9% were 65 years of age or older. The gender makeup of the city was 46.3% male and 53.7% female.

=== 2000 census ===
As of the census of 2000, there were 2,280 people, 1,013 households, and 607 families residing in the city. The population density was 671.5 people per square mile (258.9/km^{2}). There were 1,134 housing units at an average density of 334.0 per square mile (128.8/km^{2}). The racial makeup of the city was 97.54% White, 0.09% Black or African American, 1.10% Native American, 0.39% Asian, 0.13% from other races, and 0.75% from two or more races. Hispanic or Latino people of any race were 0.75% of the population.

The ancestral makeup of the population were 34.2% German, 24.7% Norwegian, 14.1% Italian, 10.3% Irish, 9.6% Swedish and 8.2% English.

There were 1,013 households, out of which 26.4% had children under the age of 18 living with them, 44.7% were married couples living together, 11.7% had a female householder with no husband present, and 40.0% were non-families. 35.1% of all households were made up of individuals, and 19.6% had someone living alone who was 65 years of age or older. The average household size was 2.18 and the average family size was 2.79.

In the city, the population was spread out, with 22.5% under the age of 18, 7.3% from 18 to 24, 23.0% from 25 to 44, 22.9% from 45 to 64, and 24.3% who were 65 years of age or older. The median age was 43 years. For every 100 females, there were 89.8 males. For every 100 females age 18 and over, there were 82.2 males.

The median income for a household in the city was $32,661, and the median income for a family was $41,612. Males had a median income of $34,519 versus $21,304 for females. The per capita income for the city was $18,688. About 9.5% of families and 11.7% of the population were below the poverty line, including 18.6% of those under age 18 and 8.3% of those age 65 or over.

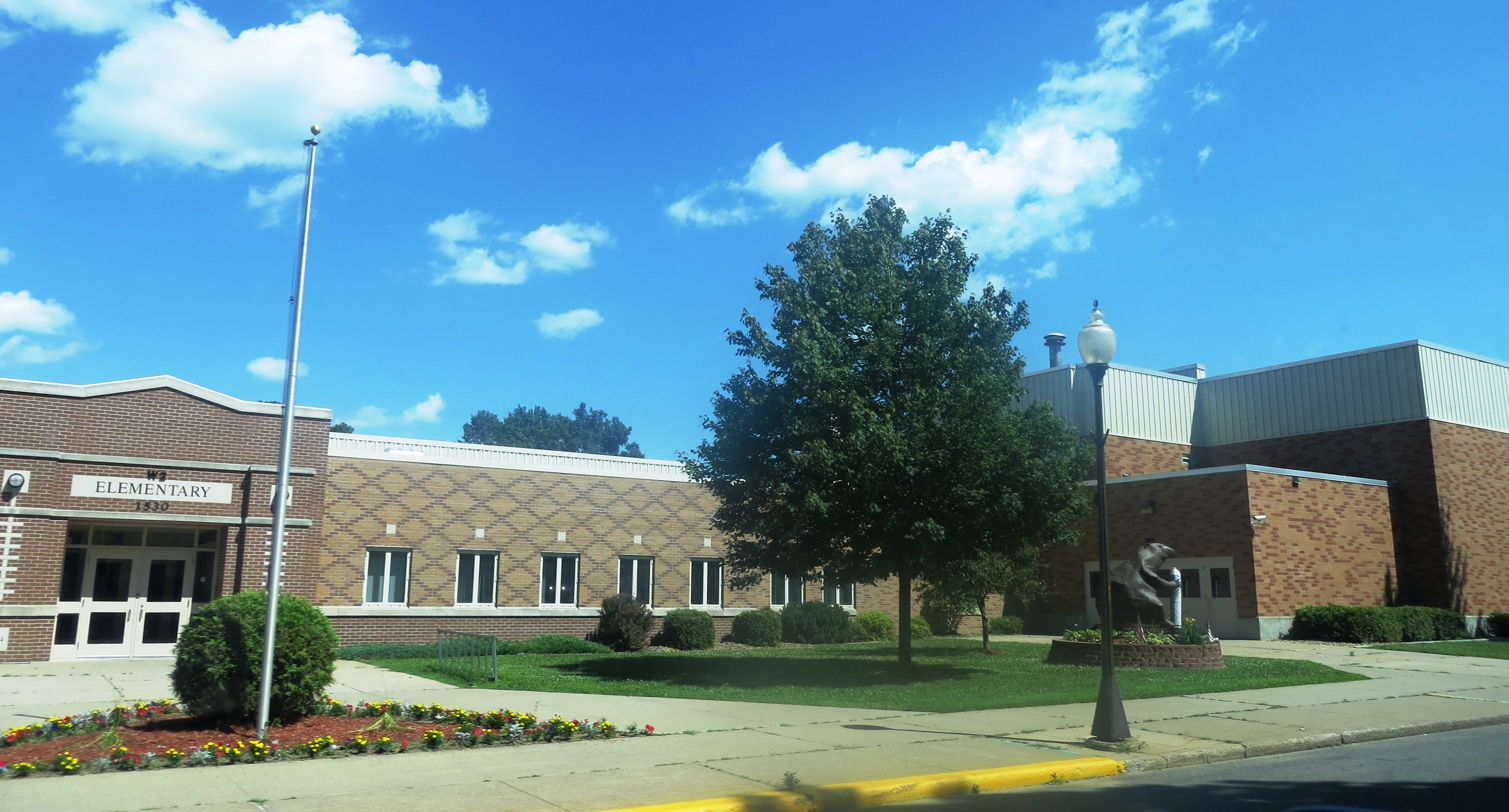
Cumberland Elementary School

== Transportation ==
Cumberland Municipal Airport (KUBE) is three miles south of Cumberland.

== Recreation ==
Cumberland is known as "The Island City" because it is nearly surrounded by Beaver Dam Lake.

Cumberland hosts the Rutabaga Festival on the weekend before Labor Day weekend. The festival features live music, carnival rides, food, a parade, and other events.

== Education ==
Public education is provided by the Cumberland School District. The District includes Cumberland Elementary School, Cumberland Middle School, Cumberland High School, and the Island City Academy.

== Notable people ==
- Jules Alfonse – NFL player
- Henry C. Doolittle – Wisconsin state representative
- David Hanson – NHL player
- Fred J. Moser – Wisconsin state representative, educator
- Ben Peterson – Olympic gold medalist
- John Peterson – Olympic gold medalist
- Thomas St. Angelo – Wisconsin state representative
- Roger A. Towberman – Chief Master Sergeant, United States Space Force
- Madeleva Wolff – poet, college president

== Images ==
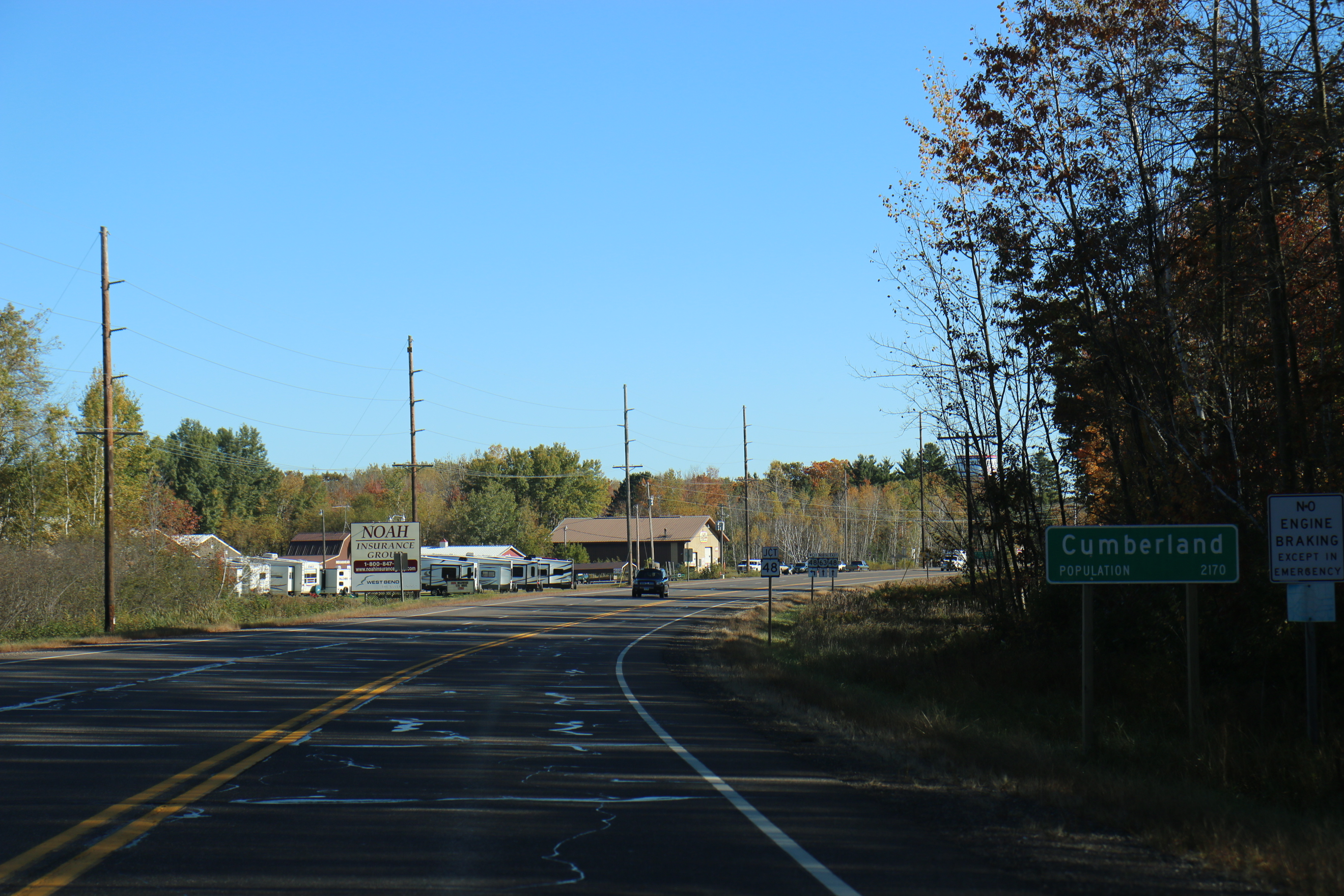
The sign for Cumberland on US63

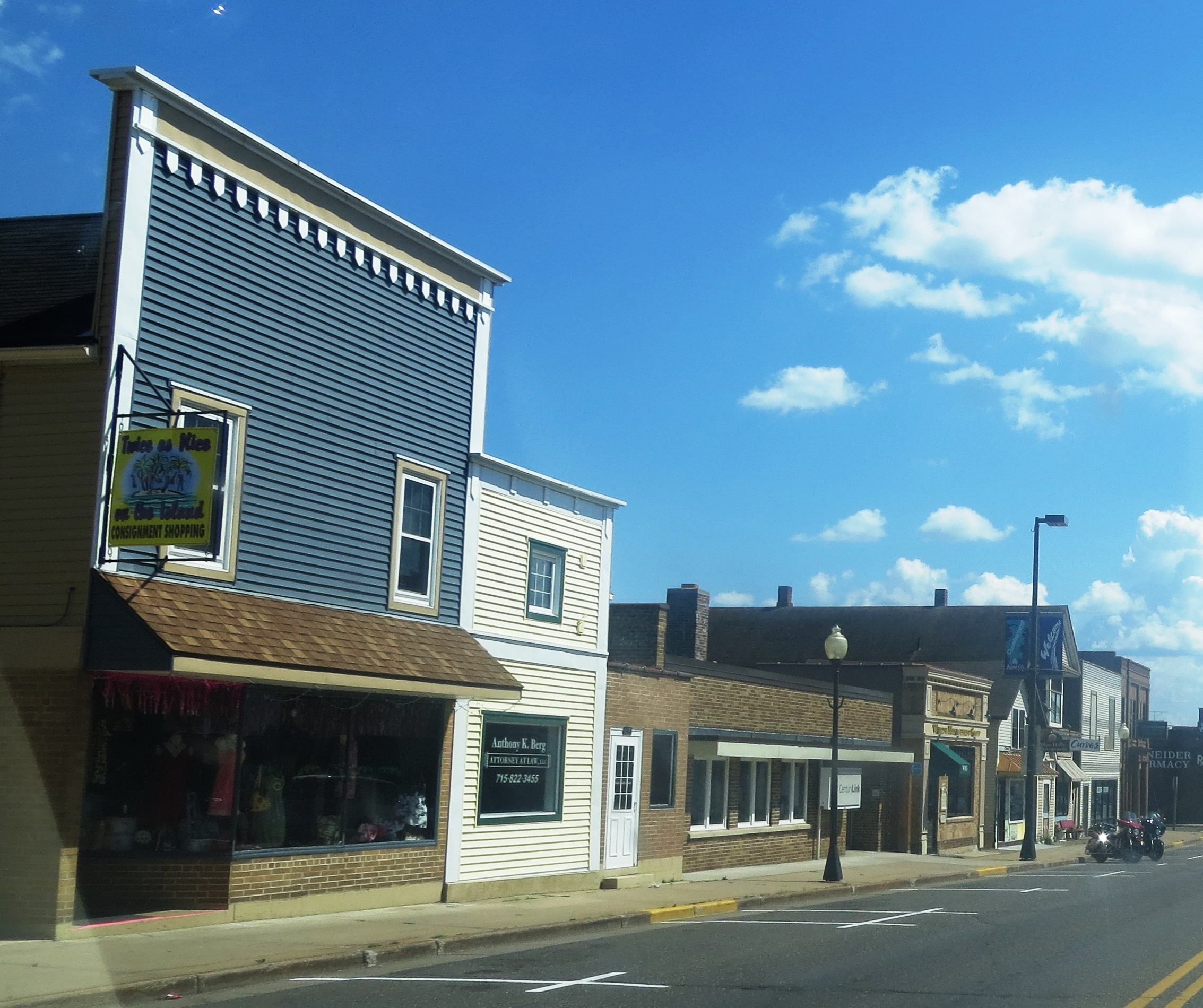
Street scene of Cumberland

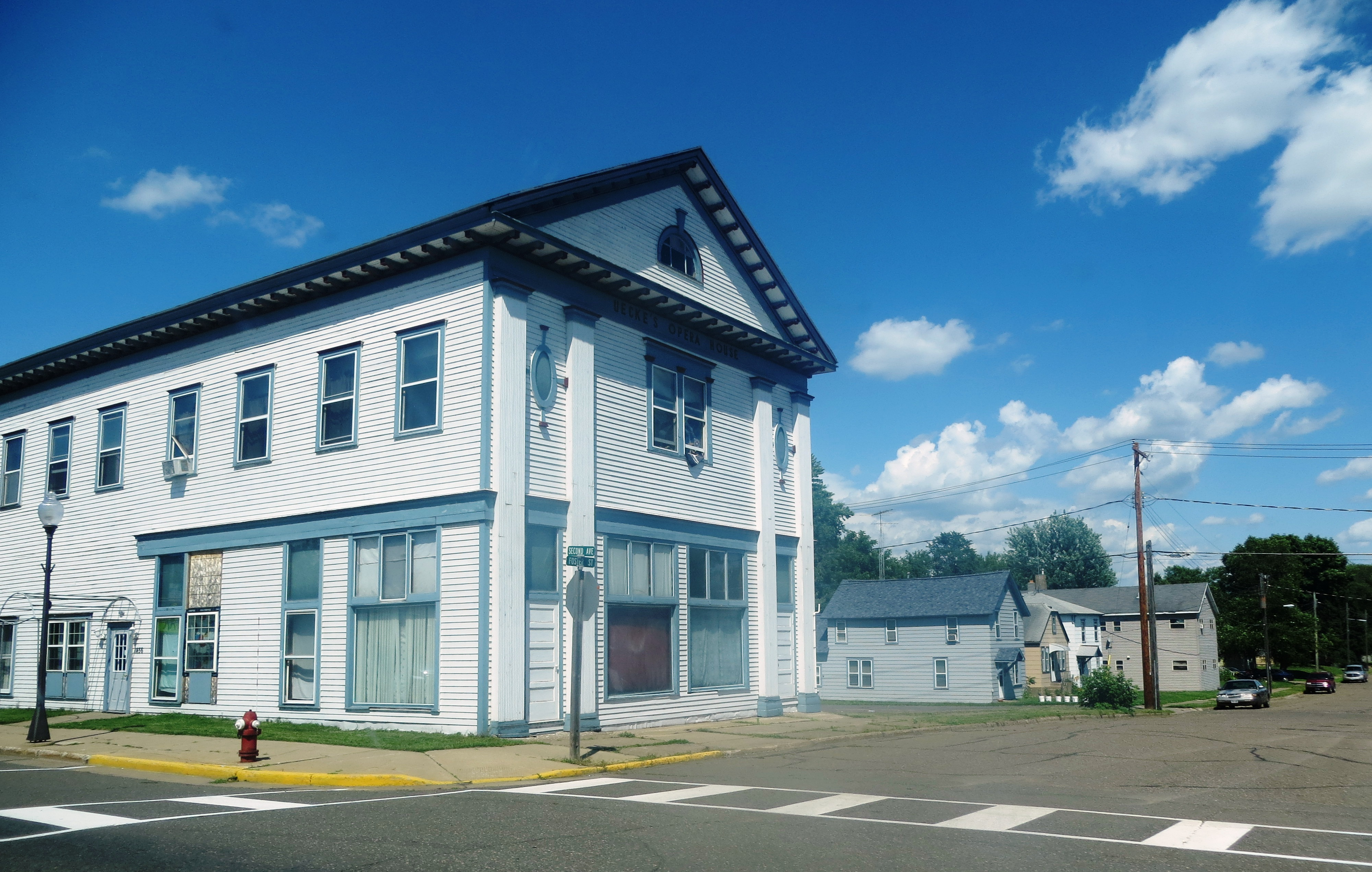
Uecke's Opera House in Cumberland

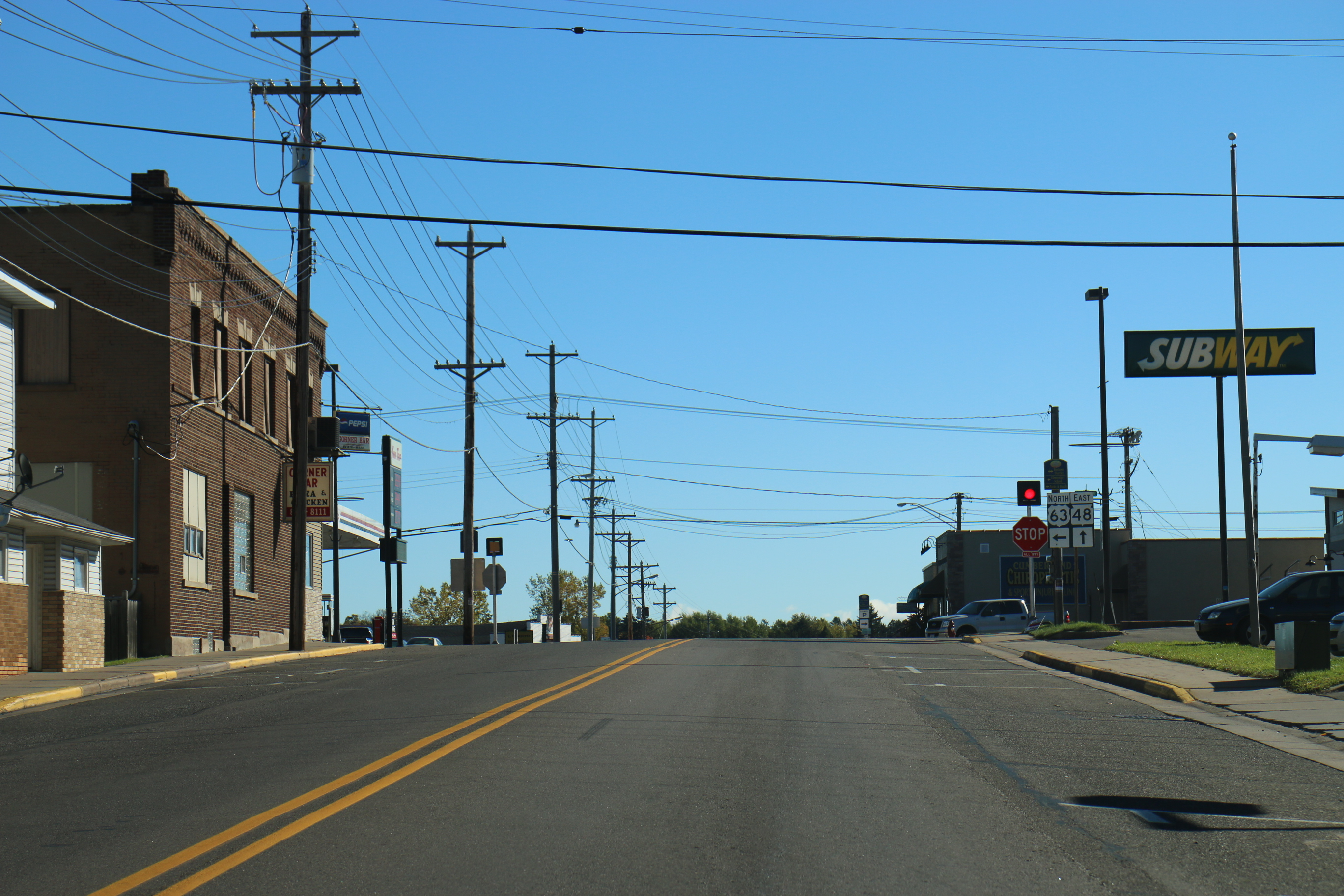
Intersection of US63 and WIS48
