= 2020 Wisconsin's 7th congressional district special election =

- May 12, 2020

Wisconsin's 7th congressional district
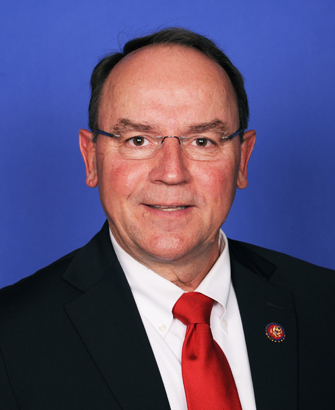

Nominee	Tom Tiffany	Tricia Zunker
Party	Republican	Democratic
Popular vote	109,498	81,135
Percentage	57.11%	42.84%
- County results Tiffany: 50–60% 60–70% 70–80% Zunker: 60–70%
U.S. Representative before election
Sean Duffy
Republican
Elected U.S. Representative
Tom Tiffany
Republican

A special election was held to fill the remainder of the term in the United States House of Representatives for Wisconsin's 7th congressional district in the 116th United States Congress. Sean Duffy, the incumbent representative, announced his resignation effective September 23, 2019, as his wife was about to give birth to a child with a heart condition. Governor Tony Evers chose January 27, 2020, as the date for the special election, with the primaries scheduled for December 30, 2019. However, the Department of Justice said that this schedule would be in violation of federal law, since it would provide insufficient time for overseas and military voters to receive ballots. Evers then rescheduled the primaries for February 18, 2020, and the general election for May 12, 2020.

== Republican primary ==
=== Candidates ===
==== Nominee ====
- Tom Tiffany, state senator for Wisconsin's 12th Senate district

==== Eliminated in primary ====
- Jason Church, U.S. Army Veteran and former staffer for U.S. Senator Ron Johnson

==== Failed to qualify ====
- Michael Opela Jr., businessman and farmer

==== Declined ====
- Luke Hilgemann, Republican strategist (endorsed Tiffany)
- Brent Jacobson, mayor of Mosinee
- Adam Jarchow, former state assemblyman (endorsed Tiffany)
- Jerry Petrowski, state senator for Wisconsin's 29th Senate district
- Romaine Quinn, state assemblyman for Wisconsin's 75th Assembly district (endorsed Tiffany)
- Fernando Riveron, surgeon

=== Endorsements ===
Jason Church

U.S. senators

- Tom Cotton, U.S. senator from Arkansas (2015–present)
- Joni Ernst, U.S. senator from Iowa (2015–present)

U.S. representatives

- Dan Crenshaw, U.S. representative from Texas's 2nd congressional district (2019–present)
- Adam Kinzinger, U.S. representative from Illinois's 16th congressional district (2011–present)
- Brian Mast, U.S. representative from Florida's 18th congressional district (2019–2023), U.S. representative from Florida's 21st congressional district (2023–present)

State legislators

- John Gard, former state assemblyman from the 89th district (1993–2007), 88th district (1987–1993) and former speaker of the Wisconsin State Assembly

Individuals

- Charlie Kirk, founder and president of Turning Point USA
- Charlotte Rasmussen, chairman of the Clark County Republican Party, and with Women for Trump

Organizations

- Combat Veterans for Congress
- New Politics
- Wisconsin Federation of Republican Women
Tom Tiffany

Executive branch officials

- Tommy Thompson, former U.S. Secretary of Health and Human Services

U.S. representatives

- Sean Duffy, former U.S. representative from Wisconsin's 7th congressional district (2011–2019)

State officials

- Sheila Harsdorf, former Wisconsin Department of Agriculture, Trade and Consumer Protection Secretary (2017–2019)
- Scott Walker, former governor of Wisconsin (2011–2019)

State legislators

- Adam Jarchow, former state assemblyman from the 28th district (2015–2019)
- Gae Magnafici, state assemblywoman from the 28th district (2019–present)
- Romaine Quinn, state assemblyman from the 75th district (2015–2021)
- Rob Stafsholt, state assemblyman from the 29th district (2017–2021)
- Patrick Testin, state senator from the 24th district (2017–present)
- Leah Vukmir, state senator from the 5th district (2011–2019) and nominee for U.S. Senate in 2018
- Shannon Zimmerman, state assemblyman from the 30th district (2017–present)

Individuals

- Luke Hilgemann, Republican strategist

Organizations

- Americans for Prosperity
- Club for Growth

=== Debate ===
2020 Wisconsin's 7th congressional district special election Republican primary debate
No.	Date	Host	Moderator	Link	Republican	Republican
Key: P Participant A Absent N Not invited I Invited W Withdrawn						
Key: P Participant A Absent N Not invited I Invited W Withdrawn					Jason Church	Tom Tiffany
1	Dec. 12, 2019	No Better Friend Corp. Wisconsin Institute for Law and Liberty; Wisconsin Manufacturers & Commerce	Michael Gableman	YouTube	P	P

=== Results ===
Results by county Map legend: Tiffany—70–80%; Tiffany—60–70%; Tiffany—50–60%; Church—50–60%

Republican primary results
Party	Candidate	Votes	%
Republican	Tom Tiffany	43,714	56.6%
Republican	Jason Church	32,339	42.1%
Republican	Michael Opela Jr. (write-in)	18	1.3%
Total votes		76,100	100%

== Democratic primary ==
=== Candidates ===
==== Nominee ====
- Tricia Zunker, president of the Wausau School Board and associate justice of the Ho-Chunk Nation Supreme Court

==== Eliminated in primary ====
- Lawrence Dale, businessman and Green Party nominee for Wisconsin's 7th congressional district in 2014

==== Failed to qualify ====
- Spencer Zimmerman, veteran and perennial candidate

==== Declined ====
- Janet Bewley, state senator for Wisconsin's 25th Senate district
- Margaret Engebretson, U.S. Navy veteran, attorney, and nominee for Wisconsin's 7th congressional district in 2018
- Pat Kreitlow, former state senator for Wisconsin's 23rd Senate district and nominee for Wisconsin's 7th congressional district in 2012
- Nick Milroy, state representative for Wisconsin's 73rd Assembly district
- Christine Brewer Muggli, attorney
- Tony Schultz, farmer
- Kelly Westlund, former congressional staffer for U.S. Senator Tammy Baldwin and nominee for Wisconsin's 7th congressional district in 2014

=== Endorsements ===
Tricia Zunker

Federal politicians

- Deb Haaland, U.S. representative (NM-1)

State politicians

- Janet Bewley, state senate assistant minority leader
- Beth Meyers, state representative
- Nick Milroy, state representative
- Patty Schachtner, state senator

Individuals

- Randy Bryce, activist, ironworker and nominee for Wisconsin's 1st congressional district in 2018

Party organizations and officials

- Democratic Party of Wisconsin

Labor unions

- International Brotherhood of Electrical Workers Local 388
- United Steelworkers District 2
- Wisconsin State AFL-CIO

Organizations

- Citizen Action of Wisconsin

=== Results ===
Results by county Map legend: Zunker—≥90%; Zunker—80–90%; Zunker—70–80%

Democratic primary results
Party	Candidate	Votes	%
Democratic	Tricia Zunker	35,577	89.7%
Democratic	Lawrence Dale	4,388	10.3%
Total votes		39,999	100%

== General election ==
=== Predictions ===
Source	Ranking	As of
The Cook Political Report	Likely R	August 26, 2020
Inside Elections	Safe R	April 23, 2020
Sabato's Crystal Ball	Safe R	April 23, 2020
Politico	Likely R	April 19, 2020
Daily Kos	Safe R	April 30, 2020

=== Post-primary endorsements ===
Tom Tiffany (R)

Executive branch officials

- Mike Pence, vice president of the United States (2017–2021)
- Donald Trump, president of the United States (2017–2021)

U.S. senators

- Ron Johnson, U.S. senator from Wisconsin (2011–present)

U.S. representatives

- Mike Gallagher, U.S. representative from Wisconsin's 7th congressional district (2019–present)
- Bryan Steil, U.S. representative from Wisconsin's 1st congressional district (2019–present)

Statewide officials

- Rebecca Kleefisch, former lieutenant governor of Wisconsin (2011–2019)

Individuals

- James Woods, actor

Organizations

- Susan B. Anthony List
Tricia Zunker (D)

U.S. senators

- Tammy Baldwin, U.S. senator from Wisconsin
- Cory Booker, U.S. senator from New Jersey
- Kamala Harris, U.S. senator from California
- Elizabeth Warren, U.S. senator from Massachusetts

U.S. Representatives

- Sharice Davids, U.S. representative from Kansas's 3rd congressional district (2019–present)
- Ron Kind, U.S. representative from Wisconsin's 3rd congressional district (1997–2023)
- Gwen Moore, U.S. representative from Wisconsin's 4th congressional district (2005–present)
- Dave Obey, U.S. representative from Wisconsin's 7th congressional district (1969–2011)

Statewide officials

- Mandela Barnes, lieutenant governor of Wisconsin (2019–2023)

Individuals

- Jon Bauman, actor, singer, game show host and political spokesman
- Piper Perabo, actress
- Bradley Whitford, actor, activist
- Ben Wikler, chair of the Wisconsin Democratic Party (2019–present)

Labor unions

- International Brotherhood of Electrical Workers Local 242
- International Brotherhood of Teamsters, Joint Council 39

Organizations

- EMILY's List
- League of Conservation Voters Action Fund
- Planned Parenthood Action Fund
- Sierra Club
- Social Security Works PAC

=== Debate ===
2020 Wisconsin's 7th congressional district special election debate
No.	Date	Host	Moderator	Link	Republican	Democratic
Key: P Participant A Absent N Not invited I Invited W Withdrawn						
Key: P Participant A Absent N Not invited I Invited W Withdrawn					Tom Tiffany	Tricia Zunker
1	May 4, 2020	Greater Wausau Chamber of Commerce; Wisconsin Public Radio	Shereen Siewert; Robin Washington	YouTube	P	P

=== Results ===
2020 Wisconsin's 7th congressional district special election
Party	Candidate	Votes	%	±%
Republican	Tom Tiffany	109,594	57.11%	–3.00
Democratic	Tricia Zunker	81,955	42.84%	+4.34
Write-in		87	0.05%	
Total votes		191,720	100.00%	
Republican hold				

==== By county ====
County	Tom Tiffany Republican		Tricia Zunker Democratic		Write-in Various		Margin		Total votes cast
County	#	%	#	%	#	%	#	%	Total votes cast
Ashland	2,473	62.15%	1,503	37.77%	3	0.08%	-970	-24.38%	3,979
Barron	4,447	39.63%	6,769	60.33%	4	0.04%	2,322	20.70%	11,220
Bayfield	3,821	62.53%	2,290	37.47%	0	0.00%	-2,290	-25.06%	6,111
Burnett	1,665	39.97%	2,501	60.03%	0	0.00%	836	20.06%	4,166
Chippewa	2,057	36.21%	3,622	63.77%	1	0.02%	1,565	27.56%	5,680
Clark	2,089	34.15%	4,029	65.85%	0	0.00%	1,940	31.70%	6,118
Douglas	6,166	60.23%	4,066	39.71%	6	0.06%	-2,100	-20.52%	10,238
Florence	432	30.04%	1,006	69.96%	0	0.00%	574	39.92%	1,438
Forest	852	34.16%	1,640	65.76%	2	0.08%	788	31.60%	2,494
Iron	882	43.75%	1,134	56.25%	0	0.00%	252	−21.50%	2,016
Jackson	146	34.76%	274	65.24%	0	0.00%	128	30.48%	420
Juneau	394	33.42%	785	66.58%	0	0.00%	391	33.16%	1,179
Langlade	1,972	34.87%	3,683	65.13%	0	0.00%	1,711	30.26%	5,655
Lincoln	3,510	41.21%	5,005	58.76%	2	0.03%	1,495	17.55%	8,517
Marathon	16,042	41.31%	22,768	58.63%	21	0.06%	6,726	17.32%	38,831
Monroe	249	33.24%	499	66.62%	1	0.04%	250	33.38%	749
Oneida	6,114	45.40%	7,322	54.37%	31	0.03%	1,206	8.97%	13,467
Polk	4,220	42.01%	5,825	57.99%	0	0.00%	1,605	15.98%	10,045
Price	1,903	42.12%	2,615	57.88%	0	0.00%	712	15.76%	4,518
Rusk	1,246	35.47%	2,266	64.50%	1	0.03%	1,020	29.03%	3,513
Sawyer	2,335	44.88%	2,867	55.10%	1	0.02%	532	10.22%	5,203
St. Croix	8,946	45.63%	10,653	54.33%	8	0.04%	1,707	8.70%	19,607
Taylor	1,368	27.34%	3,635	72.64%	1	0.02%	2,267	45.03%	5,004
Vilas	3,392	39.34%	5,227	60.62%	3	0.04%	1,835	21.28%	8,622
Washburn	2,089	42.87%	2,783	57.11%	1	0.02%	694	14.24%	4,873
Wood	3,325	41.27%	4,731	58.72%	1	0.01%	1,406	17.45%	8,057
Totals	82,135	42.84%	109,498	57.11%	87	0.05%	27,363	14.27%	191,720

== See also ==
- 2020 United States House of Representatives elections
- 2020 United States elections
- 116th United States Congress
- List of special elections to the United States House of Representatives
