= Harvey L. Dueholm =

American politician (1910–1980)

Member of the Wisconsin State Assembly
- In office January 1, 1973 – January 1, 1979
- Preceded by: District established
- Succeeded by: David E. Paulson
- Constituency: 28th district
- In office January 5, 1959 – January 1, 1973
- Preceded by: Lowell A. Nelson
- Succeeded by: District abolished
- Constituency: Burnett–Polk district

Personal details
- Born: January 29, 1910 Bone Lake, Wisconsin, U.S.
- Died: May 29, 1980 (aged 70) University of Wisconsin Hospital; Madison, Wisconsin, U.S.
- Cause of death: Cancer
- Resting place: Bone Lake Cemetery, Luck, Wisconsin
- Party: Democratic
- Spouse: Hazel (died 2005)
- Children: Will Dueholm; Robert M. Dueholm; Jim Dueholm; David Dueholm
- Occupation: dairy farmer, politician

Harvey L. Dueholm (January 29, 1910 – May 29, 1980) was an American dairy farmer and Democratic politician. He served 20 years in the Wisconsin State Assembly, representing Polk and Burnett counties.

== Biography ==
Born in the town of Bone Lake, Wisconsin, Dueholm received a high school education at Luck High School and spent nearly his entire life working on his family's dairy farm. He became associated with the Wisconsin Progressive Party, a breakaway faction from the Republican Party of Wisconsin which held significant power in the state during the 1930s and 1940s. But as the party began to dissolve in the late 1940s, Dueholm followed the majority of the progressives into the Democratic Party of Wisconsin.

In 1945, he was elected town council chairman of Luck, Wisconsin, where he served for the next 14 years. He also became a member of the Polk County board of supervisors, and was chairman from 1957 to 1959.

In 1958, he was elected to the Wisconsin State Assembly, representing the Polk and Burnett district. He defeated incumbent Republican Lowell A. Nelson, and went on to beat him in again in a close rematch in 1960. He was reelected eight more times. He announced he would not seek an 11th term in 1978, and left office in January 1979.

Dueholm was known for his defense of the University of Wisconsin, when it came under right-wing attack in the midst of protests against the Vietnam War, and for his advocacy for civil rights. Although he never served in party leadership, he was extremely popular among his colleagues.

== Personal life and family ==
Dueholm was the eldest son of Marius Dueholm, a Danish American immigrant who came to Polk County as a child with his family. Marius Dueholm was also a member of the Wisconsin State Assembly, representing Polk County for six years from 1931 to 1937.

Harvey Dueholm and his wife, Hazel, had four sons together. Their son Robert would also serve in the Wisconsin State Assembly in the same district his father once represented.

Dueholm battled cancer for over 20 years before his death in 1980. He nearly lost reelection in 1966 and 1968 due to voters believing he would die before the end of his term. In May 1980, he underwent brain surgery to remove a tumor from his brain. He died from complications from the surgery a few days later, on May 29, 1980.

Dave Obey, who represented northwest Wisconsin in the United States House of Representatives for 42 years (from 1969 to 2011), referred to Dueholm, who he served with in the Assembly, as his political mentor. In a statement, Obey said, "Harvey Dueholm cared more about justice, fairness, and the rights of each and every human being to reach his or her full potential than any legislators with whom I have ever served. He had a sense of rage about injustice and hypocrisy and used it on many occasions to make his colleagues' votes match their conscience."

== Electoral history ==
=== Wisconsin Assembly, Burnett–Polk district (1958–1970) ===
Year	Election	Date	Elected				Defeated				Total	Plurality
1958	General	Nov. 4	Harvey L. Dueholm	Democratic	5,982	52.41%	Lowell A. Nelson (inc.)	Rep.	5,432	47.59%	11,414	550
1960	General	Nov. 8	Harvey L. Dueholm (inc.)	Democratic	8,060	52.45%	Lowell A. Nelson	Rep.	7,307	47.55%	15,367	753
1962	General	Nov. 6	Harvey L. Dueholm (inc.)	Democratic	5,721	56.44%	Oscar A. Peterson	Rep.	4,415	43.56%	10,136	1,306
1964	General	Nov. 3	Harvey L. Dueholm (inc.)	Democratic	8,344	56.60%	Clifford Erickson	Rep.	6,397	43.40%	14,741	1,947
1966	General	Nov. 8	Harvey L. Dueholm (inc.)	Democratic	5,365	50.87%	Harry S. Pomeroy	Rep.	5,182	49.13%	10,547	183
1968	General	Nov. 5	Harvey L. Dueholm (inc.)	Democratic	7,718	50.60%	Eugene L. Wycoff	Rep.	7,536	49.40%	15,254	182
1970	General	Nov. 3	Harvey L. Dueholm (inc.)	Democratic	6,920	55.62%	Eugene L. Wycoff	Rep.	5,521	44.38%	12,441	1,399

=== Wisconsin Assembly, 28th district (1972–1976) ===
Year	Election	Date	Elected				Defeated				Total	Plurality
1972	Primary	Sep. 12	Harvey L. Dueholm	Democratic	2,532	84.12%	Anthony Mucciacciaro	Dem.	478	15.88%	3,010	2,054
1972	General	Nov. 7	Harvey L. Dueholm	Democratic	11,336	53.96%	Charles Tollander	Rep.	9,672	46.04%	21,008	1,664
1974	General	Nov. 5	Harvey L. Dueholm (inc.)	Democratic	9,161	64.41%	Stanley A. Warland	Rep.	4,932	34.68%	14,223	4,229
1974	General	Nov. 5	Harvey L. Dueholm (inc.)	Democratic	9,161	64.41%	William Bosak	Ind.	130	0.91%	14,223	4,229
1976	Primary	Sep. 14	Harvey L. Dueholm (inc.)	Democratic	2,532	84.12%	Bethel Roberts	Dem.	775	23.00%	3,369	1,819
1976	General	Nov. 2	Harvey L. Dueholm (inc.)	Democratic	13,104	53.94%	Donn M. Webster	Rep.	11,191	46.06%	24,295	1,913

Wisconsin State Assembly
Preceded by Lowell A. Nelson	Member of the Wisconsin State Assembly from the Burnett–Polk district January 5, 1959 – January 1, 1973	District abolished
New district	Member of the Wisconsin State Assembly from the 28th district January 1, 1973 – January 1, 1979	Succeeded by David E. Paulson
