= Wisconsin's Burnett–Polk Assembly district =

Wisconsin's Burnett–Polk State Assembly district
- Obsolete
- Notes: 1896–1910; 1954–1970

The Burnett–Polk district of Wisconsin was a district in the Wisconsin State Assembly. Located in western Wisconsin, the district consisted of Burnett and Polk counties. The district was first created via the intra-decade 1896 redistricting plan, which split Burnett County from the Bayfield–Burnett–Sawyer–Washburn district and merged it with the Polk County district. However the district was split up into the Polk County and Burnett–Washburn district in the 1911 redistricting plan. The district's first iteration was represented exclusively by Republicans, first by Lester B. Dresser and then last by Axel Johnson. The second iteration was first represented by Republican Raymond A. Peabody in 1955 and was last represented by Democrat Harvey L. Dueholm from 1959 to 1973, when the district was dissolved and replaced with the numbered district system by the 1972 redistricting act.

== List of representatives ==
Member	Party	Residence	Term start	Term end	Leg.
Lester B. Dresser	Rep.	St. Croix Falls	January 4, 1897	January 7, 1901	43rd 44th
Ole Erickson	Rep.	Grantsburg	January 7, 1901	January 5, 1903	45th
Simon Thoreson	Rep.	Grantsburg	January 5, 1903	January 2, 1905	46th
Amund Jerdee	Rep.	Deronda	January 2, 1905	January 7, 1907	47th
J. P. Peterson	Rep.	Luck	January 7, 1907	January 4, 1909	48th
Axel Johnson	Rep.	Apple River	January 4, 1909	January 6, 1913	49th
District abolished by 1911 Wisconsin Act 661; Polk County returned to a single-county Assembly district Burnett County became part of the Burnett–Washburn district.
District re-established by 1951 Wisconsin Act 728
Raymond A. Peabody	Rep.	Milltown	January 3, 1955	January 7, 1957	72nd
Lowell A. Nelson	Rep.	Grantsburg	January 7, 1957	January 5, 1959	73rd
Harvey L. Dueholm	Dem.	Luck	January 5, 1959	January 1, 1973	74th 75th 76th 77th 78th 79th 80th
District abolished by 1971 Wisconsin Act 304; The Burnett–Polk district was roughly replaced by the 28th Assembly district
