= Wisconsin's 28th Assembly district =

American legislative district in western Wisconsin

Wisconsin's 28th State Assembly district
- 2024 map defined in 2023 Wisc. Act 94; 2022 map defined in Johnson v. Wisconsin Elections Commission; 2011 map was defined in 2011 Wisc. Act 43
Assemblymember
Robin Kreibich; R–New Richmond
since January 6, 2025 (1 years)
- Demographics: 93.28% White; 0.99% Black; 2.06% Hispanic; 1.11% Asian; 1.54% Native American; 0.08% Hawaiian/Pacific Islander
- Population (2020) • Voting age: 59,628; 44,606
- Website: Official website
- Notes: Western Wisconsin

The 28th Assembly district of Wisconsin is one of 99 districts in the Wisconsin State Assembly. Located in far northwestern Wisconsin, the district comprises most of St. Croix County along with parts of western Dunn County and northeast Pierce County. It includes the cities of New Richmond and Glenwood City, and the villages of Baldwin, Deer Park, Elmwood, Hammond, Knapp, Roberts, Somerset, Spring Valley, Star Prairie, Wilson, and Woodville. The district is represented by Republican Robin Kreibich, since January 2025; Kreibich previously represented the 93rd district from 1993 to 2007.

The 28th Assembly district is located within Wisconsin's 10th Senate district, along with the 29th and 30th Assembly districts.

Western portions of the 28th Assembly district are located within the Minneapolis-Saint Paul Metropolitan Area.

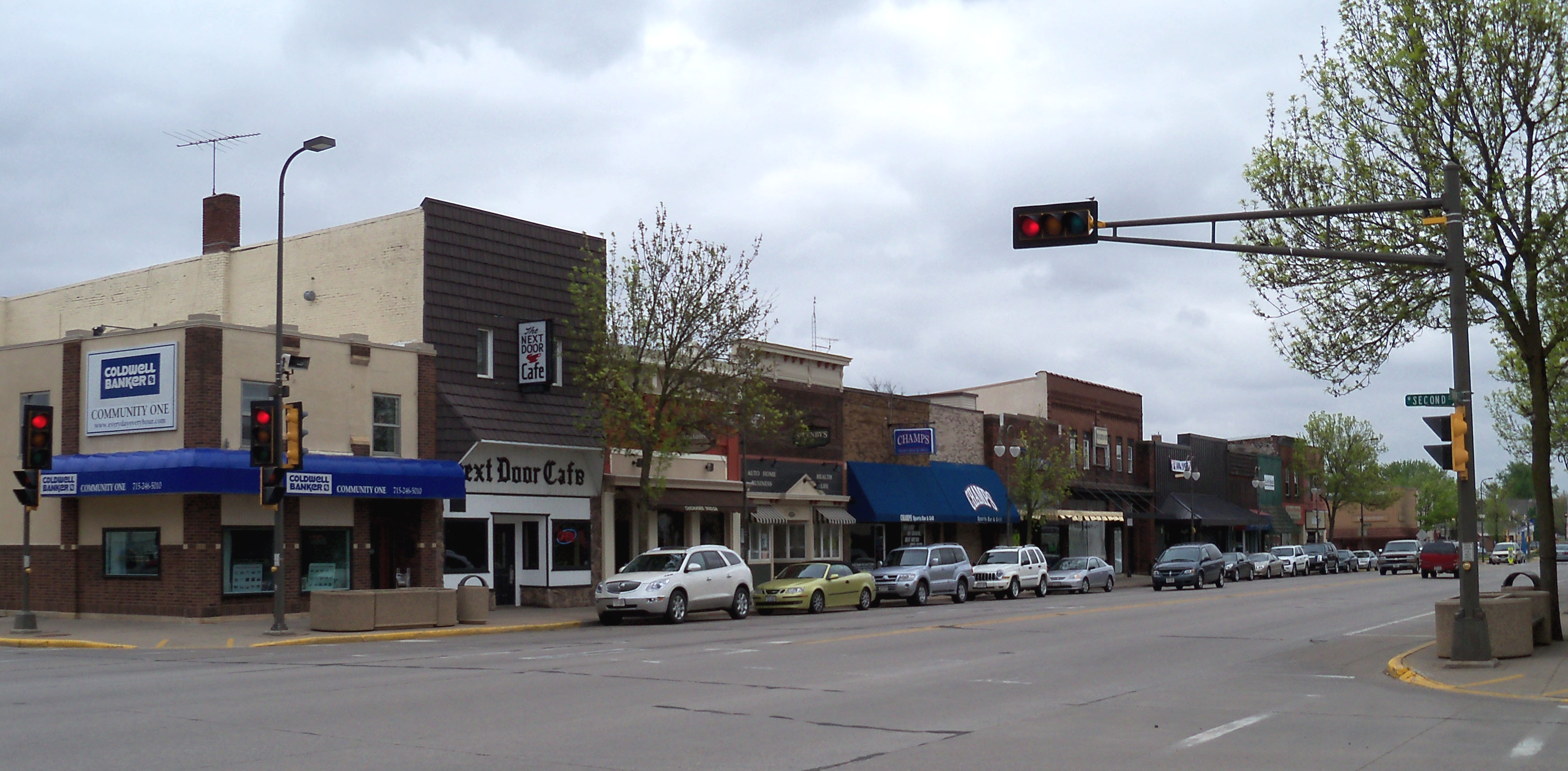
New Richmond, Wisconsin

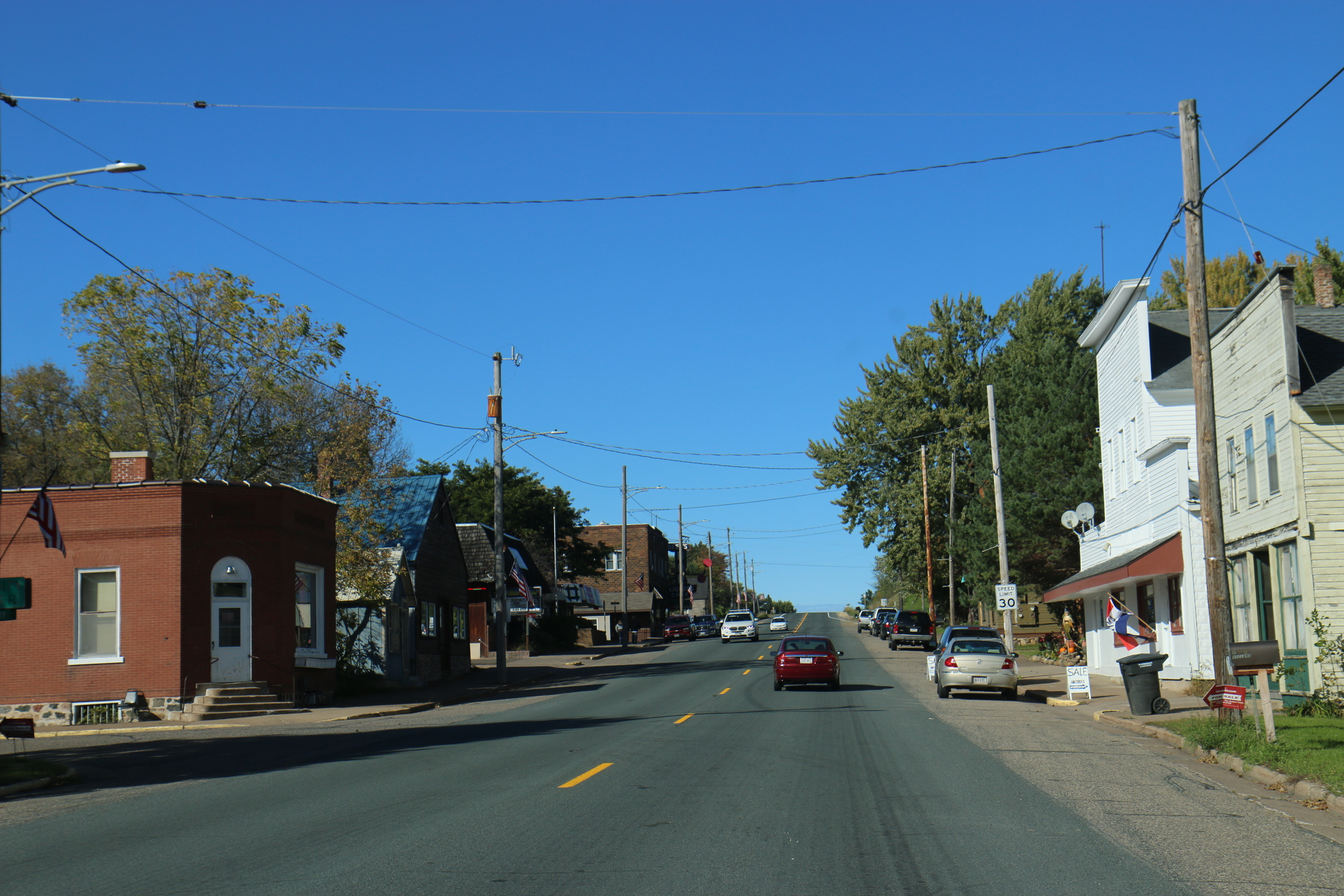
Deer Park, Wisconsin

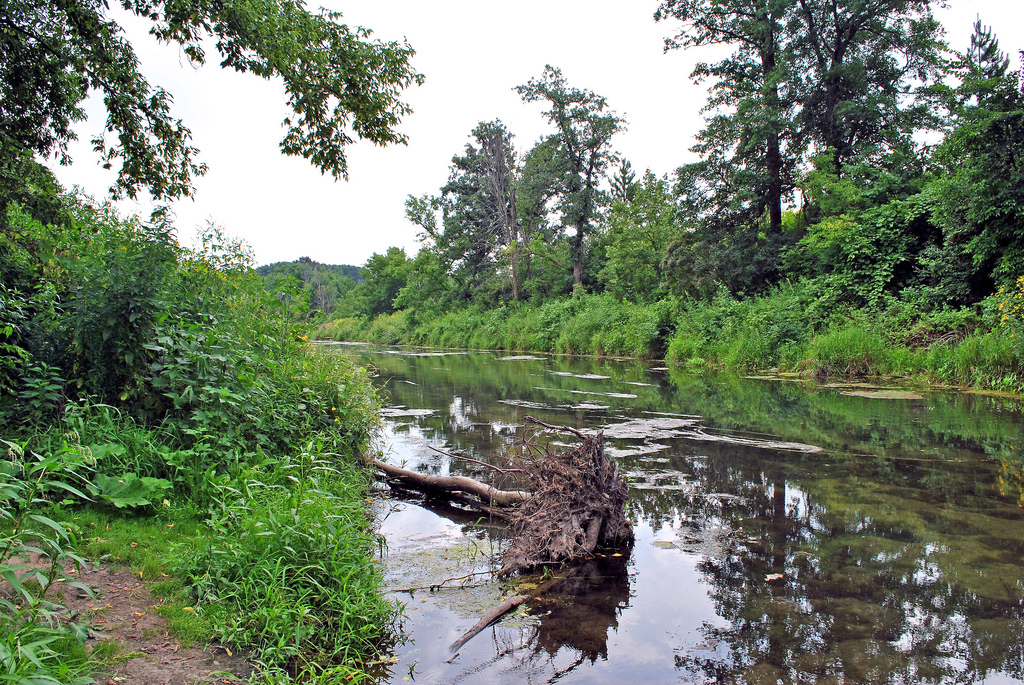
Rush River south of Baldwin

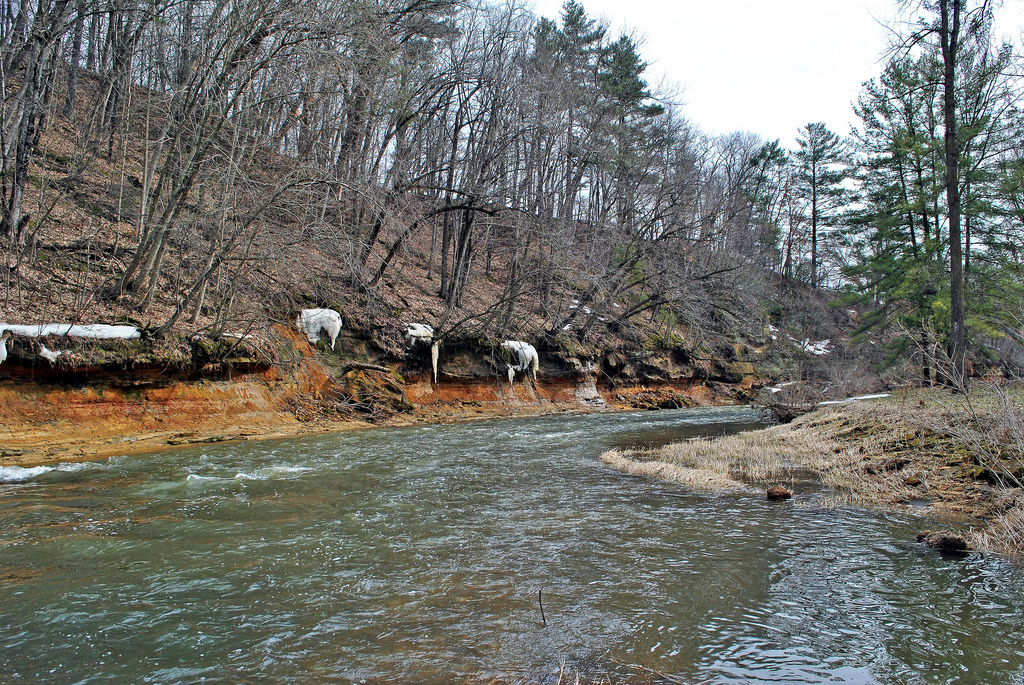
Eau Galle River in the town of Eau Galle

== History ==
The district was created with the 1972 redistricting act (1971 Wisc. Act 304) which first established the numbered district system, replacing the previous system which allocated districts to specific counties. The 28th district was drawn in line with the boundaries of the previous Burnett–Polk County district, gaining communities in eastern Barron County including the city of Cumberland and villages of Almena, Prairie Farm, and Turtle Lake, while losing the town of Farmington, Wisconsin in Polk County. The final representative of the Burnett–Polk County district, Harvey L. Dueholm, was elected in 1972 to represent the new 28th district. Dueholm served for six years as representative to the 28th district before retiring in 1978. He was succeeded by Republican David E. Paulson, who represented the district for an additional four years until he was defeated for re-election in the renumbered 41st district by Amery Democrat Harvey Stower, which had been created as a result of court-ordered redistricting.

In 1982, court-ordered redistricting briefly moved the 28th district into Milwaukee county, spanning the city of Franklin and most of Oak Creek, most of the village of Greendale, all of Hales Corners. Democrat James A. Rutkowski, who had previously represented the cities of Franklin and Muskego, and the villages of Greendale and Hales Corner under the 1972 plan, won re-election in the new 28th district and served in the 86th Wisconsin Legislature.

In 1983 the Wisconsin Legislature passed the 1983 redistricting act (1983 Wisc. Act 29) which returned the 28th district back to western Wisconsin. the 28th district was drawn to again include all of Burnett and Polk Counties, but shifted south to include parts of St. Croix County, including the village of Deer Park and the towns of Cylon, Forest, and Stanton. Former Representative David Paulson ran in the newly drawn district in 1984, and was elected to two terms, serving until he was defeated in 1988 by Stower in a rematch of the 1982 election in what was then the 41st district. Stower would serve as representative for the remainder of the decade.

In 1992, Wisconsin was unable to redistrict and the task fell again to the courts, and in the redistricting plan (Prosser v. Elections Bd., 793 F. Supp. 859), the 28th district retained all of Burnett County, as well as most of Polk County, however losing the towns of McKinley, Johnstown, and Beaver. The portion of the district in St. Croix County shifted west, shedding Deer Park, Cylon, Forest, and Stanton, and gaining the village of Somerset and the neighboring town of Somerset. Harvey Stower served for a single term in 1993 under the new configuration before mounting a campaign for Wisconsin's 3rd congressional district in 1994. Democrat Robert M. Dueholm, son of former representative Harvey Dueholm, was elected in 1994, and served for four years before being defeated for re-election by Republican Mark Pettis. Pettis went on to serve for the remainder of the decade.

In 2002 Wisconsin saw another round of court-ordered redistricting, in the resulting redistricting plan (Baumgart v. Wendelberger (2002)), the 28th district lost the towns of Blaine, Jackson, Oakland, Rusk, Sand Lake, Scott, Swiss, and Webb Lake in northern Burnett County, the town of Lorain in Polk County, and the second ward of the town of Somerset in St. Croix County. The resulting district was left with most of Burnett and Polk Counties, the Village of Somerset and most of the town of Somerset in St. Croix County. Pettis ran for re-election in the district and served for four more terms, until he was defeated for re-election in 2006 by Democrat Ann Hraychuck. Hraychuck would only serve for two terms, herself being defeated by Republican Erik Severson in 2010. Severson would serve for the remainder of the decade.

In 2011 Wisconsin saw Republicans gain unified control over redistricting for the first time in decades. Using that power, they passed the 2011 Wisconsin redistricting act (2011 Wisc. Act 43), which redrew the state legislative maps into what was described as a gerrymander which cemented Republican majorities for the next decade. However the 28th district only saw minor alterations to its pre-existing boundaries, losing Dewey, La Follette, and Roosevelt in Burnett County, and losing the village of Clayton and the neighboring town of Clayton. However the district regained the second ward of the town of Somerset in St. Croix County, and the town of Beaver in Polk County. Severson would serve for a single term under the new maps before retiring in 2014. He was succeeded by fellow Republicans Adam Jarchow, who would serve for two terms before retiring in 2018, and Gae Magnifici, who would serve for the remainder of the 2010 redistricting cycle. In 2021 Wisconsin once again faced redistricting under divided government, with Democrat Tony Evers serving as governor and Republicans holding near-supermajorities in both houses of the state legislature. Due to this gridlock the state supreme court drew maps that complied with a "least change" principle in Johnson v Wisconsin Elections Commission. The 28th district saw minor changes, however it shifted south, losing the entirety of Burnett County, but regained the rest of Polk County while losing the village of Clear Lake and town of Clear Lake, while also gaining New Richmond in St. Croix County. This configuration was only used for a single term, and Magnifici served out what would be her last term under the 2022 lines.

In 2024 Wisconsin underwent a court-ordered mid-decade redistricting after the Wisconsin Supreme Court ruled in Clarke v. Wisconsin Elections Commission ruled the existing maps to be unconstitutional. Under the threat of the court drawing a more punitive map for the Republican majority, the legislature redrew the maps and the plan was signed into law by governor Evers. The 2023 Wisconsin Redistricting Act (2023 Wisc. Act 94) saw the 28th district shift even further south, shedding all of Polk County, however the district gained most of exurban St. Croix County, including the city of Glenwood City, and the villages of Baldwin, Deer Park, Hammond, Roberts, Spring Valley, Star Prairie, Wilson, and Woodville, as well as several towns in Pierce and Dunn Counties. As Magnafici had been drawn out of the district and retired, former state representative Robin Kreibich ran in the new district, winning his first term in 2024.

== List of past representatives ==
List of representatives to the Wisconsin State Assembly from the 28th district
Member	Party	Residence	Counties represented	Term start	Term end	Ref.
District created
Harvey L. Dueholm	Dem.	Luck	Barron, Burnett, Polk	January 1, 1973	January 1, 1979	
David E. Paulson	Rep.	Amery	Barron, Burnett, Polk	January 1, 1979	January 3, 1983	
James A. Rutkowski	Dem.	Hales Corners	Milwaukee	January 3, 1983	January 7, 1985	
David E. Paulson	Rep.	Amery	Burnett, Polk, St. Croix	January 7, 1985	January 2, 1989	
Harvey Stower	Dem.	Amery	Burnett, Polk, St. Croix	January 2, 1989	January 2, 1995	
Robert M. Dueholm	Dem.	Luck	Burnett, Polk, St. Croix	January 2, 1995	January 4, 1999	
Mark Pettis	Rep.	Hertel	Burnett, Polk, St. Croix	January 4, 1999	January 1, 2007	
Ann Hraychuck	Dem.	Balsam Lake	Burnett, Polk, St. Croix	January 1, 2007	January 3, 2011	
Erik Severson	Rep.	Star Prairie	Burnett, Polk, St. Croix	January 3, 2011	January 5, 2015	
Adam Jarchow	Rep.	Balsam Lake	Burnett, Polk, St. Croix	January 5, 2015	January 7, 2019	
Gae Magnafici	Rep.	Dresser	Burnett, Polk, St. Croix	January 7, 2019	January 6, 2025	
Gae Magnafici	Rep.	Dresser	Polk, St. Croix	January 7, 2019	January 6, 2025	
Robin Kreibich	Rep.	New Richmond	Dunn, Pierce St. Croix	January 6, 2025	Current	
