= John Murtha (disambiguation) =

John Murtha (1932–2010), was a long-serving member of the United States Congress. John Murtha may also refer to:

- John Murtha Johnstown-Cambria County Airport, an airport named for the Congressman
- John Garvan Murtha (born 1941), U.S. federal judge
- John Murtha (Wisconsin politician) (born 1951), Wisconsin State Assembly (Dist. 29)
