= Paul Malloy =

Paul Malloy may refer to:

- Paul V. Malloy (fl. 2010s–2020s), Wisconsin judge
- Paul F. Malloy (born 1940), American attorney and politician in the Massachusetts House of Representatives

== See also ==
- Paul Maloy (1892–1976), American baseball player
