= Nye, Wisconsin =

- Unincorporated community
- Location within Wisconsin Location within the United States
- Coordinates: 45°18′52″N 92°34′50″W
- Country: United States
- State: Wisconsin
- County: Polk
- Elevation: 968 ft (295 m)
- Time zone: UTC-6 (Central (CST))
  - Summer (DST): UTC-5 (CDT)
- Area codes: 715 & 534
- GNIS feature ID: 1570582

Nye is an unincorporated community located in the town of Osceola, Polk County, Wisconsin, United States. Nye is located 6.5 miles east of Osceola, and less than one mile west of Horse Lake.

== Business ==
The Viking Gas Transmission Company Heliport is in Nye.

== Notable person ==
- David E. Paulson, farmer and politician, was born in Nye.
