= Gae Magnafici =

American politician (born 1952)

Member of the Wisconsin State Assembly from the 28th district
- In office January 7, 2019 – January 6, 2025
- Preceded by: Adam Jarchow
- Succeeded by: Robin Kreibich

Personal details
- Born: Gae Leila Wycoff; July 14, 1952 (age 74) Amery, Wisconsin, U.S.
- Party: Republican
- Spouse: Thomas Magnafici
- Children: 2
- Education: Sauk Valley Community College (AA)
- Profession: Nurse, business owner, legislator
- Website: Official website

Gae Leila Magnafici (née Wycoff; born July 14, 1952) is an American pediatric nurse and Republican politician from Polk County, Wisconsin. She was a member of the Wisconsin State Assembly for three terms, representing Wisconsin's 28th Assembly district from 2019 to 2025.

== Early life and career ==
Magnafici was born in Amery, Polk County, Wisconsin, and raised on a farm in the neighboring community of Deronda. She graduated from Amery High School and earned her Associate degree in Applied Science from Sauk Valley Community College in Dixon, Illinois. She became a registered nurse in 1982.

Prior to receiving her RN certification, she worked for twelve years caring for developmentally disabled patients. Since that time, she worked for 35 years as a pediatric nurse, most recently at Children's Minnesota in Saint Paul, Minnesota, before retiring in 2017.

== Wisconsin State Legislature ==
In 2018, she ran for Wisconsin State Assembly to replace Adam Jarchow, who was not seeking another term. She was unopposed in the primary election and went on to defeat her Democratic opponent in the general election, carrying 59% of the votes.

In 2020, Magnafici was re-elected to a second term, defeating Democrat Kim Butler in a rematch of the 2018 election.

On January 5, 2021, Magnafici was one of 15 Wisconsin state legislators, all Republican, who signed on to a letter asking then Vice President Mike Pence to delay the counting of electoral votes on January 6. Later that year, Magnafici proposed legislation to prevent the University of Wisconsin System and Wisconsin Technical College System from requiring on-campus students to be vaccinated or regularly tested against COVID-19 in order to access campus buildings.

In 2022, Magnafici was re-elected to a third term, defeating former Democratic state senator Patty Schachtner.

In 2024, Magnafici was moved into the 75th district as a product of redistricting, and declined to seek re-election. In the primary she endorsed Duke Tucker, who went on to defeat two other Republican opponents and defeated Democrat Jane Kleiss in the general election.

== Personal life and family ==
Magnafici sits on the board of the Polk County, Wisconsin, board of supervisors as a Citizen Member and is a member of the Town of Osceola Plan Commission.

Gae was married to the late Thomas Magnafici. An excellent singer, Gae often tours with several local bands. She and Tom have two adult children.

== Electoral history ==
=== Wisconsin State Assembly (2018–2022) ===
Year	Election	Date	Elected				Defeated				Total	Plurality
2018	General	Nov. 6	Gae Magnafici	Republican	14,441	59.01%	Kim Butler	Dem.	10,028	40.98%	24,473	4,413
2020	General	Nov. 3	Gae Magnafici (inc)	Republican	21,678	63.93%	Kim Butler	Dem.	12,230	36.06%	33,911	9,448
2022	General	Nov. 8	Gae Magnafici (inc)	Republican	16,494	62.48%	Patty Schachtner	Dem.	9,901	37.51%	26,397	6,593
