= Lincoln, Polk County, Wisconsin =

Lincoln, Wisconsin
- Town
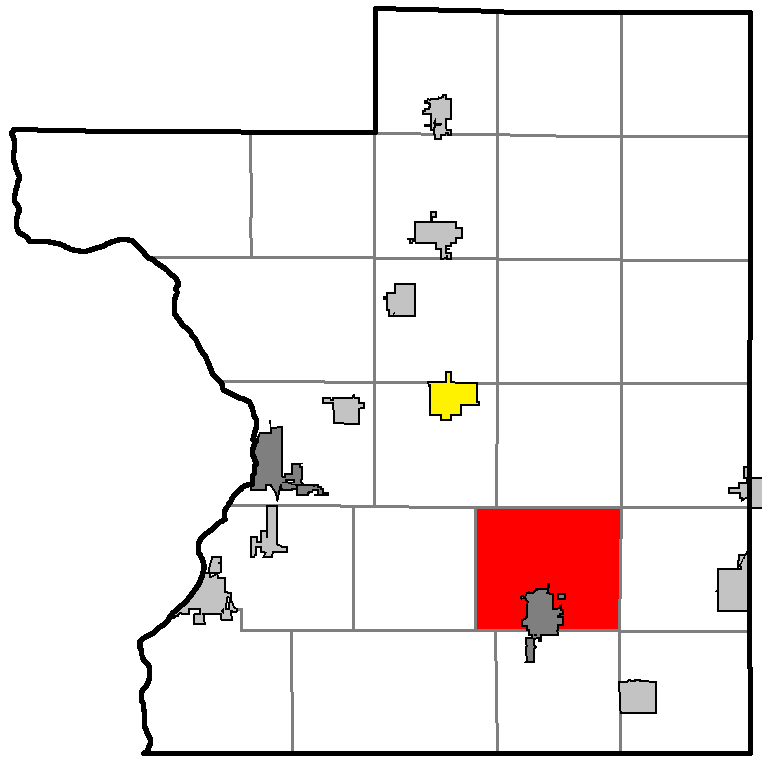
- Location of Lincoln, within Polk County

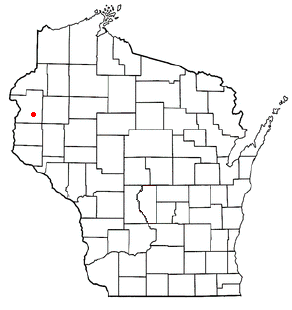
- Location of Lincoln, Polk County, Wisconsin
- Coordinates: 45°19′58″N 92°21′9″W
- Country: United States
- State: Wisconsin
- County: Polk

Area
  - Total: 38.4 sq mi (99.4 km^{2})
  - Land: 35.7 sq mi (92.5 km^{2})
  - Water: 2.7 sq mi (6.9 km^{2})
- Elevation: 1,119 ft (341 m)

Population (2020)
  - Total: 2,099
  - Density: 58.8/sq mi (22.7/km^{2})
- Time zone: UTC-6 (Central (CST))
  - Summer (DST): UTC-5 (CDT)
- Area codes: 715 & 534
- FIPS code: 55-44475
- GNIS feature ID: 1583568
- Website: https://townoflincoln-wi.com/

Lincoln is a town in Polk County, Wisconsin, United States. The population was 2,099 at the 2020 census. The unincorporated community of Deronda is located in the town.

== Geography ==
According to the United States Census Bureau, the town has a total area of 38.4 square miles (99.4 km^{2}), of which 35.7 square miles (92.5 km^{2}) is land and 2.7 square miles (6.9 km^{2}) (6.93%) is water.

== Demographics ==
As of the census of 2000, there were 2,304 people, 864 households, and 671 families residing in the town. The population density was 64.5 people per square mile (24.9/km^{2}). There were 1,119 housing units at an average density of 31.3 per square mile (12.1/km^{2}). The racial makeup of the town was 98.78% White, 0.04% African American, 0.26% Native American, 0.39% Asian, 0.09% from other races, and 0.43% from two or more races. Hispanic or Latino of any race were 0.52% of the population.

There were 864 households, out of which 34.0% had children under the age of 18 living with them, 68.5% were married couples living together, 5.8% had a female householder with no husband present, and 22.3% were non-families. 17.6% of all households were made up of individuals, and 5.9% had someone living alone who was 65 years of age or older. The average household size was 2.67 and the average family size was 3.02.

In the town, the population was spread out, with 25.9% under the age of 18, 6.2% from 18 to 24, 26.6% from 25 to 44, 28.0% from 45 to 64, and 13.3% who were 65 years of age or older. The median age was 40 years. For every 100 females, there were 103.0 males. For every 100 females age 18 and over, there were 102.9 males.

The median income for a household in the town was $45,904, and the median income for a family was $48,500. Males had a median income of $37,366 versus $23,796 for females. The per capita income for the town was $21,788. About 5.2% of families and 6.3% of the population were below the poverty line, including 9.9% of those under age 18 and 2.3% of those age 65 or over.
