= Patty Schachtner =

American first responder & politician (born 1960)

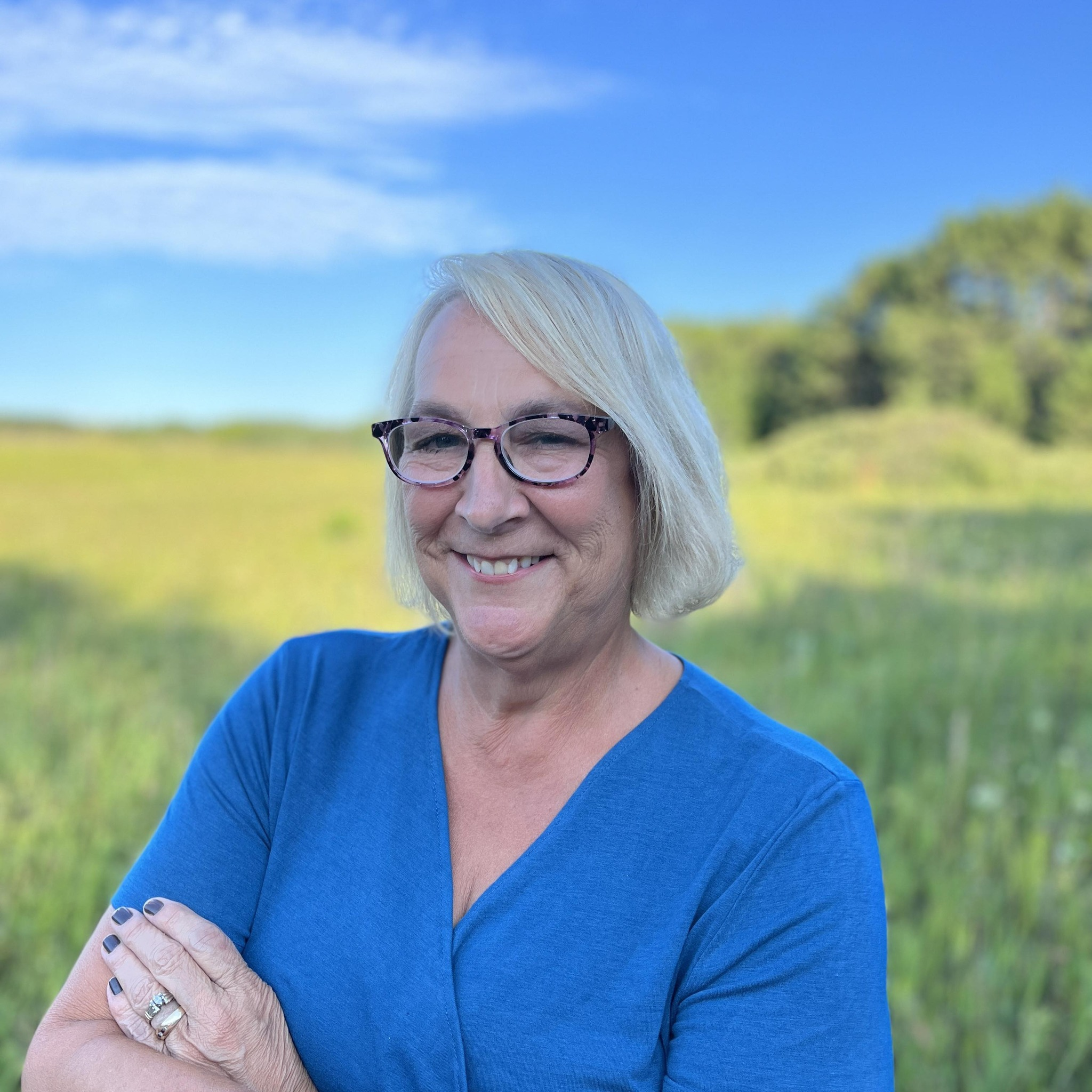
- Schachtner in 2022

Member of the Wisconsin Senate from the 10th district
- In office January 26, 2018 – January 4, 2021
- Preceded by: Sheila Harsdorf
- Succeeded by: Rob Stafsholt

Personal details
- Born: April 1, 1960 (age 66) Somerset, Wisconsin, U.S.
- Party: Democratic
- Spouse: Joe
- Children: 6
- Education: Wisconsin Indianhead Technical College
- Occupation: medical examiner, politician, emergency medical technician

Patty Rivard Schachtner (born April 1, 1960) is an American Democratic politician and medical examiner from Somerset, Wisconsin. She was a member of the Wisconsin Senate, representing Wisconsin's 10th Senate district from 2018 until 2021.

== Early life and career ==
Schachtner was born in Somerset, Wisconsin, in April 1960. She was raised on a family farm and attended Somerset High School, graduating in 1978. After graduating, she attended Wisconsin Indianhead Technical College (WITC, now Northwood Technical College), where she trained as an emergency medical technician and later worked as an EMT and EMS adult educator.

In addition to her work in emergency medical services, Schachtner served in local government and education roles, including as a member of the Somerset School Board and as a town supervisor in Star Prairie, Wisconsin. She also taught as an EMT educator at WITC.

In 2002, Schachtner began working with the St. Croix County Medical Examiner’s Office as a deputy medical examiner. In January 2011, she was appointed chief medical examiner for St. Croix County, a position she held until April 2025.

During her tenure, Schachtner’s work focused on death investigation, suicide prevention, and the professionalization of the county medical examiner system. Her role examining deaths by suicide and working with affected families was cited in regional and national reporting addressing the public health dimensions of suicide and mortality.

She also led initiatives emphasizing dignity and empathy in the handling of unclaimed remains and oversaw the adoption of new technologies, including the use of virtual autopsy imaging in certain cases as an alternative to traditional autopsies.

=== State Senate ===
In 2017, after accepting a position within the Scott Walker administration, Sheila Harsdorf resigned her seat in the Wisconsin Senate to become Wisconsin's Secretary of Agriculture. Due to the opening, Schachtner and two other Democrats filed to succeed her, with Schachtner defeating John Calabrese by a 46 point margin. Going into the general election she was considered an underdog, but on January 16, 2018, she defeated Republican nominee Adam M. Jarchow, a state legislator, by a large margin, in a district that Donald Trump had won in 2016 by over 17 points in an election mired by very low turnout. She became the first Democrat to represent the 10th district since Alice Clausing left office in 2001.

Alongside her service as state senator, Schachtner also serves on various local boards and organizations within Somerset and engages in advocacy for victims of sexual and domestic violence.

In the 2020 election, Schachtner lost her bid for election to a full term to representative Rob Stafsholt by a twenty-point margin.

=== Post-legislative career ===
After her defeat, Schachtner served as one of Wisconsin's 10 electors in the Electoral College, voting for Democratic Joe Biden.

In 2022, Schachtner ran for the 28th Assembly district against Gae Magnafici.

== Personal life and family ==
Schachtner is married and has 6 children and 13 grandchildren.

Schachtner's son, Travis, ran for State Assembly in 2014 against Adam Jarchow in the 28th Assembly district.

== Electoral history ==
=== Wisconsin Senate (2018, 2020) ===
Year	Election	Date	Elected				Defeated				Total	Plurality
2018 (special)	Primary	Dec. 19 (2017)	Patty Schachtner	Democratic	3,898	70.54%	John Rocco Calabrese	Dem.	1,365	24.70%	5,526	2,533
2018 (special)	Primary	Dec. 19 (2017)	Patty Schachtner	Democratic	3,898	70.54%	Reuben Helge Herfindahl	Dem.	260	4.71%	5,526	2,533
2018 (special)	Special	Jan. 16	Patty Schachtner	Democratic	12,249	54.60%	Adam Jarchow	Rep.	9,909	44.17%	28,427	2,340
2018 (special)	Special	Jan. 16	Patty Schachtner	Democratic	12,249	54.60%	Brian J. Corriea	Lib.	273	1.22%	28,427	2,340
2020	General	Nov. 3	Rob Stafsholt	Republican	61,914	59.91%	Patty Schachtner (inc)	Dem.	41,410	38.83%	103,353	20,504

=== Wisconsin Assembly (2022) ===
Year	Election	Date	Elected				Defeated				Total	Plurality
2022	General	Nov. 8	Gae Magnafici (inc)	Republican	16,494	62.48%	Patty Schachtner	Dem.	9,901	37.51%	26,397	6,593

Wisconsin Senate
Preceded by Sheila Harsdorf	Member of the Wisconsin Senate from the 10th district January 26, 2018 – January 4, 2021	Succeeded by Rob Stafsholt
