= Rob Stafsholt =

American politician (born 1975)

Member of the Wisconsin Senate from the 10th district
- Incumbent
- Assumed office January 4, 2021
- Preceded by: Patty Schachtner

Member of the Wisconsin State Assembly from the 29th district
- In office January 3, 2017 – January 4, 2021
- Preceded by: John Murtha
- Succeeded by: Clint Moses

Personal details
- Born: Robert Richard Stafsholt; November 1975 (age 50) St. Croix County, Wisconsin, U.S.
- Party: Republican
- Spouse: Colleen McNamara (div. 2007)
- Children: 1
- Education: University of Wisconsin, Eau Claire; University of Wisconsin, River Falls
- Website: State Senate website; Campaign website

Robert Richard Stafsholt (born November 1975) is an American farmer, businessman, and Republican politician from St. Croix County, Wisconsin. He is a member of the Wisconsin Senate, representing Wisconsin's 10th Senate district since 2021. He previously served two terms in the Wisconsin State Assembly, representing the 29th Assembly district from 2017 to 2021.

== Early life and career ==
Stafsholt graduated from New Richmond High School in 1994. He attended the University of Wisconsin–Eau Claire and University of Wisconsin–River Falls.

Stafsholt comes from a farming family and managed the family farm; he also ran his family's food manufacturing business, worked as a mortgage loan originator, and owned several rental units.

== Political career ==
=== State Assembly ===
In 2006 incumbent Republican Andy Lamb declined to seek re-election, Stafsholt was defeated by John Murtha by a 28-point margin.

In 2016, after Murtha declared that he would not seek re-election to a sixth term, Stafsholt filed to run for the 29th district seat. Stafsholt won the Republican primary, and defeated Democrat Scottie Ard in the 2016 general election. He was re-elected in 2018. In 2020, Stafsholt ran for Wisconsin State Senate from the 10th Senate district, defeating Cherlie Link of Somerset in the Republican primary and incumbent Democratic state senator Patty Schachtner in the general election.

In the state Assembly, Stafsholt sponsored legislation to eliminate state protections for wetlands and air quality and to prohibit state and local government from using the power of eminent domain to create or extend bike trails, recreational trails, and sidewalks. Stafsholt authored legislation in 2019 that eliminated Wisconsin's minimum hunting age. In 2021, Stafsholt and other Republican state legislators demanded that the Wisconsin Department of Natural Resources implement immediately a wolf hunt season before the wolf could potentially be re-added to the federal Endangered Species List.

=== State Senate ===
During his 2020 campaign for state Senate, Stafsholt criticized public-health orders issued by Governor Tony Evers to prevent the spread of COVID-19 during the pandemic, calling the orders "unlawful government overreach." In 2021, Stafsholt proposed legislation to prevent the University of Wisconsin System and Wisconsin Technical College System from requiring on-campus students to be vaccinated or regularly tested against COVID-19 in order to access campus buildings.

He is a member of the American Farm Bureau Federation, the National Rifle Association of America, the U.S. Sportsmen's Alliance, and Safari Club International; he is a former member of the Wisconsin Bear Hunters' Association and the Wisconsin Association of Mortgage Brokers.

== Electoral history ==
=== Wisconsin Assembly (2006) ===
Year	Election	Date	Elected				Defeated				Total	Plurality
2006	Primary	Sep. 12	John Murtha	Republican	1,581	57.68%	Rob Stafsholt	Rep.	800	29.19%	5,550	2,268
2006	Primary	Sep. 12	John Murtha	Republican	1,581	57.68%	Isaac Weix	Rep.	360	13.13%	5,550	2,268

=== Wisconsin Assembly (2016, 2018) ===
Year	Election	Date	Elected				Defeated				Total	Plurality
2016	Primary	Aug. 9	Rob Stafsholt	Republican	1,352	73.44%	Vince Trudell	Rep.	485	26.34%	1,841	867
2016	General	Nov. 8	Rob Stafsholt	Republican	16,774	61.10%	Scottie E. Ard	Dem.	10,661	38.83%	27,454	6,113
2018	General	Nov. 6	Rob Stafsholt (inc)	Republican	12,523	54.70%	John Rocco Calabrese	Dem.	9,750	42.58%	22,896	2,773
2018	General	Nov. 6	Rob Stafsholt (inc)	Republican	12,523	54.70%	Brian Corriea	Lib.	620	2.71%	22,896	2,773

=== Wisconsin Senate (2020, 2024) ===
Year	Election	Date	Elected				Defeated				Total	Plurality
2020	Primary	Aug. 11	Rob Stafsholt	Republican	12,603	64.85%	Cheri Link	Rep.	6,828	35.13%	19,435	5,775
2020	General	Nov. 3	Rob Stafsholt	Republican	61,914	59.91%	Patty Schachtner (inc)	Dem.	41,410	38.83%	103,353	20,504
2024	General	Nov. 5	Rob Stafsholt (inc)	Republican	66,652	62.35%	Paul Hambleton	Dem.	40,158	37.57%	106,899	26,494
