= Marius Dueholm =

American farmer and politician

Marius Dueholm (January 5, 1881 – January 18, 1936) was an American farmer and politician.

Born in Søndbjerg, Denmark, Dueholm emigrated to the United States in 1890 with his family. Dueholm settled in Luck, Wisconsin, where he was a farmer. He served on the town and school boards and on the Polk County, Wisconsin Board of Supervisors. From 1931 until his death, Dueholm served in the Wisconsin State Assembly on the Wisconsin Progressive Party ticket. He died at his home in Luck, Wisconsin.
