= John Murtha (Wisconsin politician) =

American politician

Member of the Wisconsin State Assembly from the 29th district
- In office January 3, 2007 – January 3, 2017
- Preceded by: Andy Lamb
- Succeeded by: Rob Stafsholt

Chairman of the Eau Galle Town Board
- In office 2003–2009

Member of the St. Croix County Board of Supervisors
- In office 1999–2003

Member of the Eau Galle Town Board
- In office 1999–2009

Personal details
- Born: August 8, 1951 (age 75) Baldwin, Wisconsin
- Party: Republican
- Spouse: Terrie
- Children: 4
- Education: Chippewa Valley Technical College
- Website: Official website

John Murtha (August 9, 1951) is a Wisconsin politician and former member of the Wisconsin State Assembly.

== Biography ==
Born in Baldwin, Wisconsin, Murtha attended St. Croix Central (Hammond) High School and Chippewa Valley Technical College in wood technology. He is a Republican. He was Chairman of the Town Board of Eau Galle, Wisconsin from 2003 through 2009. He served in the Wisconsin State Assembly from 2007 through 2017. He is a member of the National Rifle Association of America and the Aircraft Owners and Pilots Association.

== Electoral history ==
Year	Election	Date	Elected				Defeated				Total	Plurality
2006	Primary	Sep. 12	John Murtha	Republican	1,581	57.68%	Rob Stafsholt	Rep.	800	29.19%	5,550	2,268
2006	Primary	Sep. 12	John Murtha	Republican	1,581	57.68%	Isaac Weix	Rep.	360	13.13%	5,550	2,268
2006	General	Nov. 7	John Murtha	Republican	10,474	51.58%	Kerry Kittel	Dem.	9,776	48.14%	20,307	698
2008	General	Nov. 4	John Murtha (inc)	Republican	17,633	53.38%	Chris Buckel	Dem.	14,115	42.73%	33,036	3,518
2008	General	Nov. 4	John Murtha (inc)	Republican	17,633	53.38%	Craig Mohn	Lib.	1,257	3.80%	33,036	3,518
2010	General	Nov. 2	John Murtha (inc)	Republican	12,533	62.35%	Liz Jones	Dem.	7,548	37.55%	20,100	4,985
2012	General	Nov. 6	John Murtha (inc)	Republican	15,237	55.84%	Jim Swanson	Dem.	12,004	43.99%	27,287	3,233
2014	General	Nov. 4	John Murtha (inc)	Republican	14,953	98.49%	--Unopposed--				15,182	14,724
