= Wisconsin Institute for Law and Liberty =

- Formation: 2011
- Location: Milwaukee, Wisconsin
- Methods: Public interest law
- President & General Counsel: Rick Esenberg
- Revenue: $6.05 million (2025)
- Expenses: $4.09 million (2025)
- Website: www.will-law.org

The Wisconsin Institute for Law and Liberty (WILL) is a nonprofit conservative law firm based in Milwaukee, Wisconsin. The group was founded by lawyer Rick Esenberg in 2011.

== Activities ==
The organization has defended right-to-work laws.

In 2016, WILL announced the launch of the Center for Competitive Federalism, a national effort to bring lawsuits and conduct research to promote state sovereignty. That same year, the organization filed a lawsuit seeking to overturn Wisconsin's Unfair Sales Act, also known as the minimum markup law, which prevents companies from selling products below cost. In 2017, it filed a lawsuit in the Wisconsin Supreme Court Koschkee v. Taylor arguing that the Wisconsin Department of Public Instruction (DPI) issued regulations without the approval of the state's governor and the Wisconsin Department of Administration, thus violating the REINS Act. It was seen as an attempt to limit the power of Governor Tony Evers, then the State Superintendent of Public Instruction. Though Evers's role was nonpartisan, he had announced he would challenge Republican Scott Walker for the governorship. In June 2019, the Wisconsin Supreme Court ruled 4–2 in favor of WILL, determining that DPI could not make administrative rules without approval of the governor.

In September 2020, during the COVID-19 pandemic in Wisconsin, WILL filed lawsuits to stop a face mask mandate in Wisconsin. In March 2021, the conservative-leaning Wisconsin Supreme Court, on a 4–3 vote, struck down the statewide mask mandate, saying that Governor Tony Evers had violated state law by extending his emergency orders, including the mandate, beyond the initial 60-day emergency mandate.

In 2021, WILL sued the Wisconsin Department of Natural Resources (DNR), on behalf of a Kansas-based group called Hunter Nation Inc. WILL prevailed in the suit, forcing the state to permit the hunting and trapping of wolves in Wisconsin.

In October 2020, a progressive legal group, Law Forward, was founded in Wisconsin as a counterbalance to WILL.

=== Wisconsin Elections Commission lawsuit ===
In 2019, WILL sued the Wisconsin Elections Commission for not removing from the voter rolls 234,000 Wisconsin voters who were flagged as having potentially moved and who did not respond to a mailing. Paul V. Malloy, the presiding circuit court judge in Ozaukee County, Wisconsin, ruled in favor of WILL, purging the voters. The Wisconsin Elections Commission filed suit in federal court to halt the contested purging. Acting on behalf of the state's Elections Commission, which deadlocked 3-3 on the matter, Wisconsin Attorney General Josh Kaul joined the appeal to stay the removals ordered by Malloy. The Elections Commission estimated that the voter verification process would take from one to two years to complete prior to initiating any action to remove those former voters, the accuracy of whose registrations still remained unresolved. On January 2, 2020, WILL said it asked the circuit court to hold the Elections Commission in contempt, fining it up to $12,000 daily, until it advanced Malloy's order. The Wisconsin Supreme Court heard the case about the purging of the voter rolls on October 4, 2020, but was not expected to make a decision before the November election.

The Democratic Party argued that the purge targeted voters living in areas favoring Democrats. On January 12, 2020, Malloy found the three Democrats on the stalemated six-member Elections Commission to be in contempt of court, ordering them each to pay a fine of $250 daily until they complied with his order. Malloy urged speedy implementation of his order, saying, "We're deadlocked, time is running and time is clearly of the essence." The Milwaukee Journal Sentinel examined the list of voters subject to being purged because they were presumed to have moved and found that about 55 percent of those registrants had been domiciled in municipalities that had been won by Hillary Clinton in the 2016 general election. Those were mainly from Wisconsin's largest cities, Milwaukee and Madison, as well as other college towns.

In 2016, Trump had carried Wisconsin by fewer than 23,000 votes. After the contempt order was issued by Malloy, a stay issued later that day by the state Supreme Court upheld his purge mandate. That finding was subsequently reversed by an appeals court, but WILL appealed its decision to the Wisconsin Supreme Court. In the April 7, 2020, election, voters ousted incumbent Daniel Kelly, a conservative Supreme Court justice, who had been appointed by Governor Scott Walker. Kelly had been thought to be a possible swing vote in the Court's deciding the case. In April 2021, the Wisconsin Supreme Court ruled in a 5-2 ruling that the Wisconsin Election Commission should not remove from its rolls voters flagged as possibly having moved, as local municipal elections officials rather than the state election commission should be tasked with removing voter registrations. Of the 69,000 people flagged by the elections commission as being "likely movers", none voted in the 2020 presidential election. No voters were removed from the voter rolls while the legal fight was pending.

=== 2020 election fraud investigation ===
This group spent ten months investigating Donald Trump's f claims of widespread election fraud in the 2020 U.S. presidential election. WILL found no evidence of widespread fraud. The group found, for instance, 130 cases of ex-felons voting, and 42 ballots from potentially deceased voters, but not in numbers that could have affected the election results, or that could be described as an intentional effort to subvert the election. WILL found "no evidence of significant problems with voting machines," and despite Trump's repeated claims that machines from the firm Dominion Voting Systems were used by Democrats to steal the election, the group found that Democrats actually performed worse than expected in counties that used the Dominion machines. The group found no evidence of "ballot dumping," another common accusation from Trump. In the few cases where some state rules were not correctly followed, little to no evidence showed that voters who cast those ballots "did anything intentionally wrong" and they were likely just following election officials' advice, and thus this is not cause for throwing out those ballots or a basis to "infer fraud."
