= Paul V. Malloy =

American judge

Paul V. Malloy was the presiding circuit court judge for Ozaukee County, Wisconsin.

== Education and career ==
Malloy graduated with a bachelor's degree in business administration from the University of Wisconsin-Milwaukee in 1981 and received a J.D. degree from John Marshall Law School (Chicago) in 1985. He was appointed to the bench in 2002 then elected to a full six-year term in 2003. He was re-elected in 2009, 2015 and 2021.

Malloy was involved in a number of disputes with fellow Ozaukee County Judge Joseph Voiland.

In 2019, Malloy ordered that 234,000 voters who were flagged as having potentially moved and who did not respond to a mailing should be removed from the state's voter rolls. Wisconsin's Attorney General Josh Kaul filed a notice of appeal to halt the purging, acting on behalf of the state's Elections Commission which was split 3-3, and requested a stay of Malloy's order. The issue was brought before the court by the conservative nonprofit law firm the Wisconsin Institute for Law and Liberty (WILL). The lawsuit demanded that the Wisconsin Election Commission respond to a "Movers Report," generated from voter data analysis produced by the Electronic Registration Information Center (ERIC), a national, non-partisan partnership funded in 2012 by the Pew Charitable Trusts. ERIC shares voter registration information to improve the accuracy of voter rolls.

The ERIC report tagged 234,039 voters, roughly 7% of all registrants in the state, who it believed may have moved to an address that had not yet been updated on their voter registration forms. Notifications were sent to all those voters that their registration needed to be updated. Sixty thousand of those letters were found to be undeliverable. Twenty three hundred voters confirmed that their registrations were correct and 16,500 had registered at their current addresses. Registrations of those found to be deceased would be removed. The Commission estimated that the verification process would take 12–24 months to complete before action was taken to remove those former voters whose registrations remained unresolved. On January 2, 2020, WILL said it asked the circuit court to hold the Elections Commission in contempt, fining it up to $12,000 daily, until it advanced Malloy's December 17, 2019, order to purge from the voting rolls hundreds of thousands of registered voters who possibly have moved to a different address.

The Democratic Party argued that the purge targeted voters living in areas favoring Democrats. On January 12, 2020, Malloy held the three Democrats on the stalemated six-member Elections Commission in contempt of court and ordered them to pay a fine of $250 a day until they complied with his order. Malloy urged speedy implementation of his order, saying, "We're deadlocked, time is running and time is clearly of the essence." The Milwaukee Journal Sentinel assessed the list of voters subject to being purged because they were presumed to have moved, finding that about 55 percent of those registrants had been living in municipalities which Hillary Clinton had won in the 2016 election. These were predominantly from college towns and Wisconsin's largest cities, Milwaukee and Madison. In 2016, Trump had carried the state by less than 23,000 votes. After the contempt order was issued, a stay issued later that day by the state Supreme Court upheld Malloy's purge. That was subsequently reversed by an appeals court, whose decision was appealed to the Wisconsin Supreme Court by WILL.

On April 7, 2020, effective on August 1, 2020, voters ousted Daniel Kelly, a conservative Supreme Court justice, an appointee of Governor Scott Walker, by a margin of 120,000 votes. Kelly had been expected to be a swing vote in deciding the case. The Wisconsin Supreme Court heard the case about purging of the voter rolls on October 4, 2020, but was not expected to make a decision before the November election. In April 2021, the Wisconsin Supreme Court ruled in a 5-2 ruling that the Wisconsin Election Commission should not remove from its rolls voters flagged as possibly having moved, as local municipal elections officials rather than the state election commission should be tasked with removing voter registrations. Of the 69,000 people flagged by the elections commission as being "likely movers", none voted in the 2020 presidential election. No voters were removed from the voter rolls while the legal fight was pending.

Malloy retired on April 1st, 2024, effective June 1st 2024, ahead of the end of his term scheduled for 2027. Wisconsin Governor Tony Evers appointed Ozaukee County District Attorney Adam Gerol as Malloy's successor on May 24th 2024.
