= COVID-19 pandemic in Wisconsin =

- Disease: COVID-19
- Pathogen: SARS-CoV-2
- Location: Wisconsin, U.S.
- Index case: Madison
- Arrival date: February 5, 2020
- Confirmed cases: 651,338 (2021-08-25)
- Active cases: 2,176 (10 day total)
- Hospitalized cases: 116 (7-day average); 32,121 (cumulative)
- Critical cases: 35 (7 day average)
- Recovered: 602,822
- Deaths: 7,558

Government website
- www.dhs.wisconsin.gov/covid-19/

The global COVID-19 pandemic struck the U.S. state of Wisconsin in early February 2020. Although Wisconsin has to date experienced 144 deaths per 100,000 residents, significantly fewer than the US national average of 196 deaths, COVID-19 was one of the three leading causes of death in Wisconsin in 2020. On August 25, 2021, Wisconsin public health authorities reported 7 day averages of 1,417 new cases and 236 probable cases per day, an increase of greater than 15 fold since late June 2021. This brings the cumulative total of COVID-19 cases in Wisconsin to 651,338. The state's death toll is 7,558, with 30 new deaths over the previous 7 days. As of August 25, 2021, 12.41% of Wisconsin's residents have been positively diagnosed with COVID-19, the 20th highest per-capita case rate among all US states. January 16's 128 COVID-19 deaths set a new single day record for Wisconsin.

A steady upward trend of new COVID-19 cases in late June/early July accelerated in mid-July, with several new single day records reported in late July. In response to July's rising case and death tolls, Governor Tony Evers issued a face mask mandate for all citizens over age 5 while in any building that is not a private home. A lawsuit challenging the mandate was filed by the Wisconsin Institute for Law and Liberty on August 25. According to a poll of registered voters conducted by Marquette University, the majority of registered voters support the mandate. Columnist Michael Tomasky argues that insisting on the right to infect someone else with a deadly disease is not a conservative principle and is in fact the opposite of freedom for the victim. "Freedom emphatically does not include the freedom to get someone else sick."

As of August 25, 2021, Wisconsin has administered 6,038,886 COVID-19 vaccine doses. 54.1% of Wisconsin residents have received one dose and 50.9% have completed the vaccine series.

== Timeline ==
=== February 2020 ===
On February 5, 2020, the first COVID-19 case was reported in Wisconsin – a person who had recently traveled to Beijing and was exposed to a COVID-19 patient there.

=== March 2020 ===
On March 10, the University of Wisconsin–Milwaukee announced that classes would begin to be moved online after an employee in the school's foundation office was tested for COVID-19. On March 11, the University of Wisconsin–Green Bay announced that classes will be moved to "alternative delivery methods" going into effect immediately after spring break on March 23. The University of Wisconsin–Madison announced a suspension of all in-person classes beginning March 23.

On March 13, Governor Tony Evers ordered all schools (public and private) in the state to close by March 18, with no possibility of reopening until April 6 at the earliest.

On March 17, community transmission, also known as community spread, was announced in Dane County.

On March 27, Governor Evers declared a moratorium for 60 days on evictions and foreclosures.

=== April 2020 ===
On April 24, thousands of anti-lockdown protesters gathered at the state capitol in Madison, the same day the state health department announced 304 new cases - the most new cases since the pandemic began.

=== May 2020 ===
On May 8, the Wisconsin DHS announced that 72 individuals who tested positive for COVID-19 recently attended "a large event."

=== June 2020 ===
On June 20, The Juneau County Department of Health announced that an outbreak occurred at a gentlemen's club in Wisconsin Dells with an unknown number of infected people visiting the club between June 10 and 14.

From June 13 to 26, Dane County had an uptick of new cases with 614 people testing positive for COVID-19. Roughly half of these cases were between the ages of 18 and 25 and almost half of these cases had reported attending a gathering or party with people outside of their household. By the end of the month, Dane County had experienced multiple record-setting days of the highest totals of new cases per day in the county, and the trend continued of most new cases being younger people.

By mid-way through 2020, Wisconsin had experienced 786 deaths and is expected to have the disease to be a new leading cause of death in the state according to associate professor of population sciences at the University of Wisconsin–Madison. During the last week of June, Wisconsin experienced an upward trend in cases, but not a spike as seen in other states.

=== July 2020 ===
A steady upward trend of new COVID-19 cases in late June/early July accelerated in mid July, with several new single day records reported in late July. In response to July's rising case and death tolls, Governor Tony Evers issued a face mask mandate for all citizens over age 5 while in any enclosed space that is not a private home.

=== August 2020 ===
On August 5, 16 cases were confirmed at the Wisconsin Veterans Home at Union Grove.

On August 11, the Pierce County Health Department announced 23 cases among residents and staff at an assisted living facility, and three deaths.

On August 13, a Seneca Foods plant in Cumberland was linked to an outbreak in Barron County, which had 315 positive cases. About 44% of the workers at the plant tested positive.

On August 26, at least two people who tested positive reported attending the Sturgis Motorcycle Rally, among other possible exposures.

On August 31, the New Lisbon Correctional Institution in Juneau County had more than 40 positive cases.

=== September 2020 ===
On September 9, after two days of a test positivity rate over 20%, the University of Wisconsin-- Madison announced it would pause in-person instruction for two weeks. Two large residence halls were quarantined.

The August 7–16 Sturgis Motorcycle Rally in South Dakota may have contributed to the surge of cases in early September; San Diego State epidemiologists estimated that the rally may have been a super spreader event, resulting in 266,000 new COVID-19 cases in the US, including some in Wisconsin.

Cases continued to increase with a 150% spike in cases near the end of September. Many school districts started the school year with virtual classes. Kenosha gave students a choice between full-time classroom or full-time remote instruction after parents demanded an in-person option. At least five students or staff members tested positive since the first day of classes on September 14.

=== October 2020 ===
By October 6, Wisconsin was third nationwide for number of new cases capita. The seven-day moving average of new COVID-19 cases in Wisconsin on October 10 was 2,395; the average rate of new cases nearly tripling over the past month.

On 14 October 2020, Wisconsin opened a new field hospital at the state fairgrounds near Milwaukee.

The state reported 3,132 new cases on October 9 as cases and hospitalizations in the state continued to rise. Wisconsin's daily cases first exceeded 1,000 on July 21, and had reached 2,000 daily cases on September 17. The governor's office announced a statewide order to limit indoor mass gatherings that went into effect on October 8, prompting a lawsuit to strike down the new mask mandate and restrictions. According to the governor's office the May ruling from the state supreme court that stopped stay-at-home orders from going into effect in the early months of the pandemic did not impact the Department of Health Services authority under existing statutes to impose restrictions on mass gatherings.

New daily cases rose nearly everyday from early September, reaching record highs by mid-October. There were 34 deaths in the state on October 13, and 3,279 new cases, 959 new hospitalizations and 243 in intensive care. The metropolitan areas of Oshkosh-Neenah, Appleton and Green Bay had some of the highest rates nationwide.

=== November 2020 ===
In November, five private schools and some families petitioned the Wisconsin Supreme Court asking that the Racine Unified School District be prevented from requiring all students to do online learning as opposed to in person instruction. The Wisconsin Institute for Law and Liberty filed the petition on behalf of the schools and families. The Wisconsin Supreme Court granted an injunction in favor of the schools and families pending a review of a similar case in Dane County. Meanwhile, COVID-19 cases surged across Wisconsin, averaging 5,395 new cases and 43 deaths per day during the month of November. A single day record of 7,989 new cases was set on November 18.

=== December 2020 ===
Despite social distancing and other efforts to mitigate spread of the COVID-19 disease, eight nuns from the School Sisters of Notre Dame died within a week of each other, including four on the same day, after there was a positive infection confirmed on Thanksgiving Day by one of the residents of their retirement home, which houses approximately one hundred residents. The retirement home is located in Elm Grove, Wisconsin.

Across the state, new single day records for COVID-19 deaths in Wisconsin were set on December 1 (107 deaths) and December 22 (120 deaths). An average of 3,677 new COVID-19 cases were reported per day during the first two weeks of December.

In late December, a pharmacist with Aurora Health Care allegedly deliberately allowed 57 vials (570 doses) of a Moderna COVID-19 vaccine to spoil by leaving them out of refrigeration for two nights. After an internal investigation into the matter, police arrested the pharmacist in question. According to the police, the value of the wasted vaccine cost between $8,000 and $11,000.

== Government responses ==
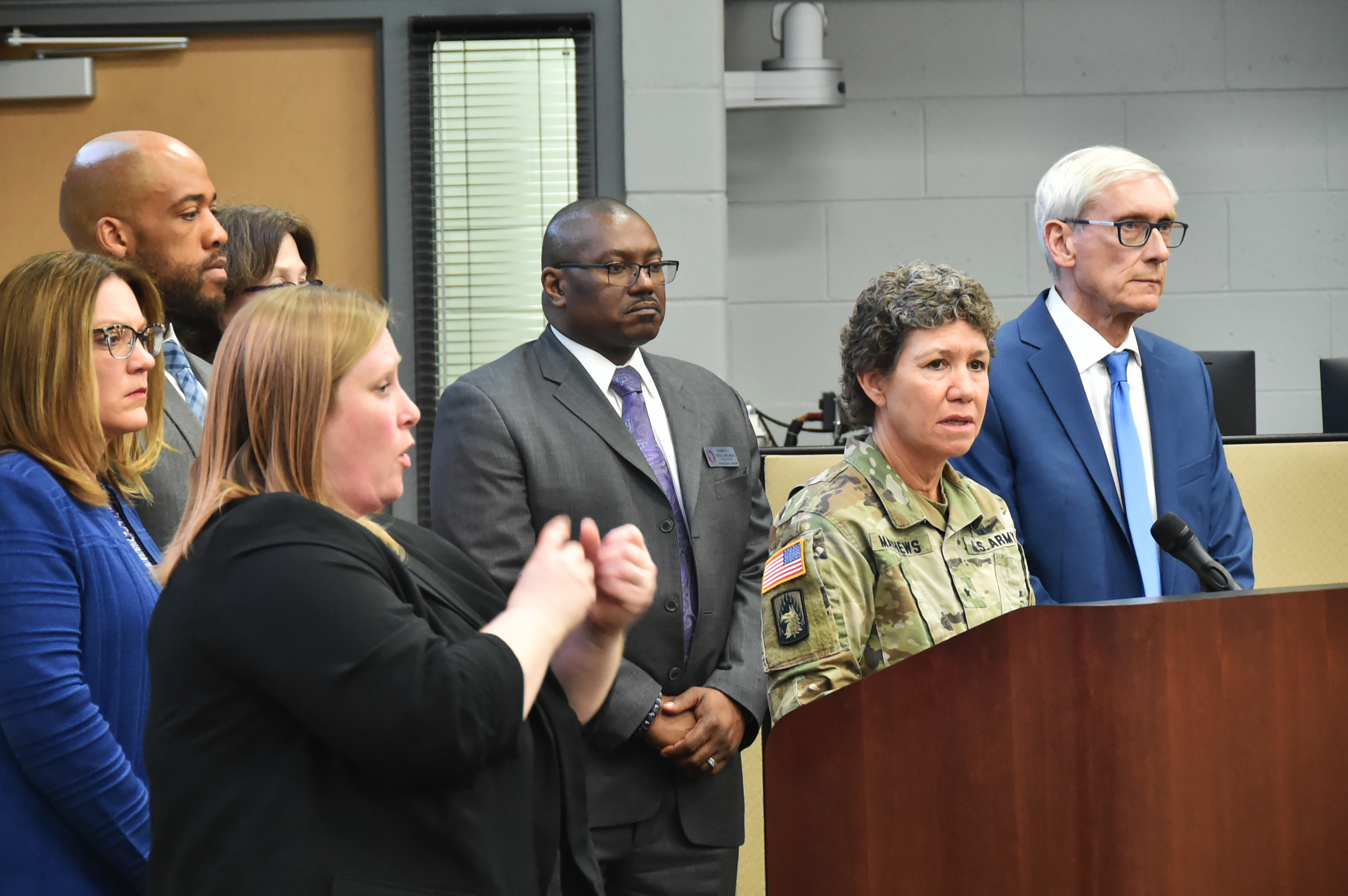
Brig. Gen. Joane Mathews, Wisconsin's deputy adjutant general for Army, answers media questions during a March 12 press conference at the State Emergency Operations Center in Madison.

=== Schools ===
On March 10, the Osceola School District closed schools to sanitize the buildings and buses after a person who attended a regional sports tournament was found to be infected. On March 12, Governor Tony Evers declared a State of Emergency. The next day, he ordered the closure of all public and private K-12 schools in the state until at least April 5.

Most schools in the University of Wisconsin System, including Madison and Stout, have cancelled all in-person classes through early April.

=== Mass gatherings ===
On March 16, Evers announced restrictions on the number of people that could be present at childcare facilities, limiting it to 10 staff and 50 children at the same time.

On March 17, a statewide ban of all gatherings with more than 10 people was announced by the governor.

In mid-June, Racine County judge Jon Fredrickson issued a temporary injunction against the city of Racine's "Forward Racine" order. The order limited certain businesses such as gyms, restaurants, and bowling alleys to a capacity of 25% or a maximum of ten persons. The plaintiff, David Yandell, claimed that the order jeopardized his business's ability to survive.

On July 2, following a sustained high number of new cases, Dane County issued order #7 limiting outdoor gatherings to 25 people, indoor gatherings to 10 people, and indoor dining capacity to 25% for restaurants, as well as prohibiting indoor dining in bars, a space of particular concern to health officials.

In May 2021, the city of Milwaukee announced lifting restrictions effective June 15, 2021. Capacity limits were lifted for the Milwaukee Bucks, Milwaukee Brewers, festivals, and businesses. At the time of the announcement, the city experienced a rate of infection for the disease at 82 COVID-19 cases per 100,000 people and a test positivity rate is 4 percent, with about 29.5 percent of the population fully vaccinated. About two weeks later, the Milwaukee Bucks announced returning to full capacity for the remainder of the NBA playoffs. After the Bucks won the NBA championship on July 20, the city of Milwaukee experienced a surge in COVID-19 infections of nearly 500 persons which was a 155 percent rise in the infection rate following the celebration of the championship. The infection rate increase was attributed to possibly a result of the championship parade held for the team and the fact that about 65,000 people gathered in the Deer District (the area surrounding the arena where the Bucks play) during the championship game.

=== Stay at home ===
On March 23, Evers announced closures of all non-essential businesses to be signed on Tuesday, March 24, and urged citizens to stay at home to reduce the spread of COVID-19.

On April 16, the 'Safer At Home' order was extended to be in effect until May 26.

On April 17, Racine County Sheriff Christopher Schmaling said he planned not to enforce the 'Safer At Home' order, stating constitutional rights of citizens as his reasoning. His declaration is similar to concerns raised by four sheriffs in the state of Michigan.

On April 21, the Wisconsin state legislature filed suit with the state supreme court, against the governor's 'Safer At Home' order calling the executive order an overreach of the executive branch's statutory powers.

On April 24, Hartford Mayor Tim Michalak announced that businesses would be allowed to re-open on Monday April 27, despite the 'Safer-At-Home' order issued by Governor Evers. He directed the police department not to enforce the 'Safer-At-Home' order.

On May 13, the Wisconsin Supreme Court struck down Governor Evers "Safer-At-Home" orders as unconstitutional. On May 14 Mike Wiza, mayor of Stevens Point said they had still not received any guidance from the legislature, which made it "very, very difficult" for local law enforcement and the health department. The Governor announced on May 18 that the legislature didn't want any state level guidelines. In the absence of a statewide legislative order, the decision left the task of imposing health restrictions to the local governments. Dane County reissued the 'Safer-At-Home' orders nearly in full, and in Milwaukee County restrictions were put in place, including a mask mandate.

One week after the Supreme Court decision Wisconsin reported 528 new COVID-19 cases, the largest single day rise in new COVID-19 cases since the start of the pandemic.

=== Primary elections ===
On March 27, Governor Evers asked the legislature to approve a plan to send every registered voter in the state an absentee ballot so they could vote in the Democratic and Republican primaries, scheduled for April 7, by mail. Republicans opposed the plan. In Green Bay a judge turned down a request to delay the election but other lawsuits move forward. Authorities also refused to delay the election, despite the ban on gatherings with over ten persons, even though 111 jurisdictions did not have enough people to staff even a single polling place, and with 60% of all Wisconsin towns and cities were reporting staffing shortages.

Epidemiologists and public health experts said that it was not possible to definitively determine the extent to which the virus spread among Wisconsin voters at polling places, due to a lack of testing and contact tracing; the difficulty of determining the location where an infected person acquired the virus; and asymptomatic transmission.

=== Mask mandate ===
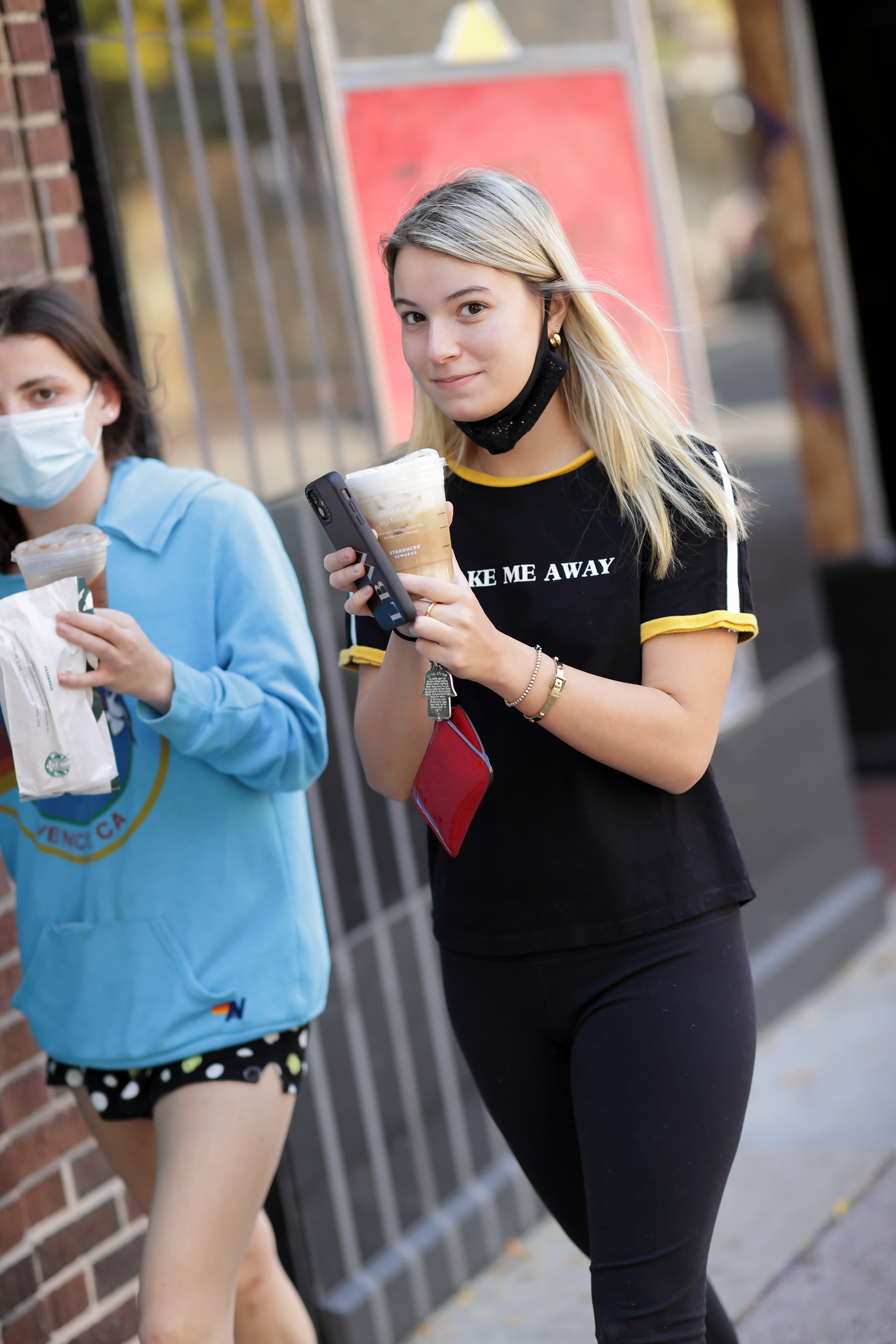
Teens wearing face masks in Madison, Wisconsin, 2020.

On July 30, Governor Evers declared a public health emergency and issued an emergency order requiring people to wear a face mask in public indoor spaces Many cities and counties including Green Bay, Superior, Racine, Whitewater and Milwaukee and Dane Counties had already implemented mask mandates before the statewide order was issued.

A lawsuit challenging the mandate was filed by the Wisconsin Institute for Law and Liberty (WILL) on August 25. The mask mandate was put in place as part of the public health emergency declared in July. According to a poll of registered voters conducted by Marquette University, the majority of registered voters support the mandate.

On September 22, as cases in the state continued to rise, the mask mandate was extended until November 21. The decision to extend the mandate was criticized by some members of the state legislature.

A Wisconsin judge denied an injunction request from state Republicans on October 12. State Republicans filed the injunction seeking to prevent enforcement of the mask mandate, arguing that the governor had wrongfully declared a state of emergency more than once. The judge ruled that the governor had "broad discretion to act whenever conditions in the state constitute a public health emergency."

Small business owners in Green Bay, one of the most severely affected cities, have said the economic future of local businesses depends on people wearing masks and following the social distancing guidelines. Out of 10,430 potential Door County visitors returning surveys from May 14–18, 9,083 (87.1%) said they were willing to wear a mask, and 1,347 (12.9%) said they were not willing to wear a mask.

The Wisconsin courts have had mixed responses to a lawsuit brought about by the Tavern League of Wisconsin (the trade association representing the state's bars), who sued to halt the order. After Governor Evers issued another order in October 2020 limiting the number of people allowed to gather in public locations, a Sawyer County judge (John M. Yackel) ordered a temporary restraining order halting the order. A few days later, another judge, James Babler, from Barron County reinstated the order. In September 2020, amid the coronavirus pandemic, WILL filed lawsuits to stop a face mask mandate in Wisconsin. On November 18, Governor Evers issued orders extending those mandates through mid-January, 2021.

== Other responses ==
=== Business ===
After it was announced that Governor Evers would extend the 'Safer At Home' executive order to May 26, the Tavern League of Wisconsin responded by expressing concerns about the devastating effect on the hospitality industry adversely affected by the order. Executive Director of the organization Pete Madland requested a 'soft opening' beginning May 1 with precautions utilized as it pertains to limiting the spread of the disease. The concern is that the original order has had adverse effects on the industry already and that another extension could cause many of the businesses within the industry to not survive.

David Yandell, the owner of a gym, sued the city of Racine after the municipality issued its own stay at home order after the state supreme court struck down Governor Evers' order. Racine County judge Jon Fredrickson issued a temporary injunction against the order while a civil suit against the city is pursued.

On April 16, 2020, Dave Eliot, the publisher of several Door County, Wisconsin periodicals argued that locals should stop being so mean to those who support the local economy and advised people not shoot the golden goose. He also wanted locals to remember that resources such as the hospital were available to the community because of donations from seasonal residents.

After Governor Evers issued another order in October 2020 limiting the number of people allowed to gather in public locations, the Tavern League of Wisconsin filed a lawsuit in Sawyer County. League president Chris Marsicano stated "Restaurants, taverns, bars, and supper clubs did not cause this pandemic, but they are systematically facing bankruptcy, closure, and economic ruin". Judge John M. Yackel subsequently ordered a temporary restraining order halting the order. The order was set to limit gatherings to 25% capacity at restaurants, taverns and supper clubs. A few days later, Judge James Babler of Barron County reinstated the order stating "Plaintiffs and interveners have not shown that they are entitled to a temporary injunction".

In Egg Harbor, a manufacturer made components needed to make ventilators, and a distillery made hand sanitizer. In Sturgeon Bay, one manufacturer switched to producing reusable face masks and intubation boxes, while another designed a device intended to kill viruses and other pathogens on face masks and other personal protective equipment. A responsible business brand promise program was announced in Door County on May 15. It is not a certification and intentionally lacks enforceability with either the visitor bureau or hospital in order to direct any liability to the individual businesses should someone get infected. Also on May 15, the county extended quarantine restrictions locally. This extension was ended one day early on May 19 when the county reopened all businesses, but asked people to limit travel and follow other voluntary safety precautions on the basis of "scientific data, local information, and the benefits associated with continuation/resumption of local personal activities and business" and the expectation "that individuals and businesses will voluntarily" obey the precautions.

=== Citizenry ===
Thousands of citizens protested at the Capitol in Madison on April 24 in response to Evers' extension of the 'Safer-At-Home' executive order. Among the reasons for protest include many businesses that have closed or significantly reduced the workforce, which has led to hundreds of thousands of unemployment claims. Also, churches have closed their doors and about 900,000 children are not in school.

Over 100 people protested outside the Mequon-Thiensville school district headquarters holding signs demanding that the schools open for in-person instruction. Concerns raised by the protesters included the difficulty for parents that are employed and being able to work with the virtual learning arrangements, as well as social and emotional well-being of the students. The school district decided to go to a virtual format due to health concerns related to the COVID-19 pandemic.

Prior to the first confirmed case in Door County, hundreds of vehicles with out-of-state license plates were seen across multiple communities, even though the shops were still boarded up for the winter. The president of the Door County Visitor Bureau said, "It seems like everybody thinks this is the hiding place and they all want to come here." As the county under ordinary circumstances only has the capacity to support 25 hospital patients (Note: Hospital capacity could be expanded to fifty patients, and the county was granted a waiver by the state in 2020 to add as many beds to the hospital as needed.) (including four (Note: Due to preparations, as of April 3, there was a capacity for 12 ICU patients; however the need for adequate staffing for all ICU units complicates the potential for further increases in ICU capacity. Although the hospital ordinarily has only six ventilators, hospital personnel as of April 9 were able to repurpose other medical equipment for use as ventilators, for a total of 15.) intensive care beds), the county government, along with multiple community governments, advised seasonal residents not to come to the county yet, or if they do anyway, to self-isolate for 14 days upon arrival. Postal address change records indicated that, prior to April 3, at least 420 seasonal residents relocated to the county. That was considered unusual since seasonal residents usually tend to arrive later on. The publisher of several county-related periodicals argued that locals should stop being hostile to those who support the local economy. He also wanted locals to remember that resources such as the hospital were available to the community because of donations from seasonal residents. Private campgrounds were permitted to allow people with sufficiently advanced campers to camp beginning on April 24. The Communications and Public Relations Director of the Door County Visitor Bureau expressed concern about what locals were posting on social media and warned people to "mind your Ps and Qs" because it would impact traveler sentiment.

In November, five private schools and some families petitioned the Wisconsin Supreme Court asking that the Racine Unified School District be prevented from requiring all students to do online learning as opposed to in person instruction. The Wisconsin Institute for Law and Liberty filed the petition on behalf of the schools and families. The Wisconsin Supreme Court granted an injunction in favor of the schools and families pending a review of a similar case in Dane County.

=== Religious Ceremonies and Masses ===
The Archdiocese of Milwaukee initially suspended all masses from March 18 through April 3. Also, Catholic schools would cease in-person instruction. Archbishop Jerome Listecki later extended the suspension into Holy Week, including Easter Mass, choosing to live stream all such ceremonies from an otherwise empty Cathedral of St. John the Evangelist (The archdiocese then paid for time on WVTV and WISN-TV to telecast both the Good Friday and Easter Masses live across the entire Milwaukee market). In early May, Archbishop Listecki announced that masses could resume May 31 with churches filled at 25% capacity and lifting dispensation for Mass to July 5. The dispensation from Mass has since been extended through September 13.

On August 22, Bishop Donald J. Hying expressed extraordinary disappointment at the timing of a Dane County order to close in person instruction at schools that requires virtual instruction instead, which gave the parents less than sixty hours to make home-based arrangements. On August 28, 2020, Madison's St. Ambrose Academy and seven Dane County parochial schools filed an original action in the Wisconsin Supreme Court challenging the County health office's emergency order on religious liberty grounds and as lacking statutory authority.

== Statistics by county ==
=== Racial disparities ===
ProPublica conducted an analysis of the racial composition of COVID-19 cases in Milwaukee County dating through the morning of April 3, 2020. They noted that African Americans comprised nearly half of the county's cases and 22 of the county's 27 deaths. Both the county and city of Milwaukee passed resolutions in May and June 2019, respectively, declaring racial inequality to be a public health crisis, despite the fact that both Asian Americans and Mexican Americans live substantially longer than Whites.

== Impacts ==
=== Education ===
Virtual instruction has been held in the Milwaukee Public Schools since March 2020 due to the pandemic. The Guardian reported that Dan Rossmiller of the Wisconsin Association of School Boards indicated that "It's not only a question of how we get these kids back to where they would have been had the pandemic not occurred, but how do we get them back to where they should be?" in response to the detrimental effect the lack of in-person instruction has had on the inner city schools. The effects of school closures due to the pandemic will be far-reaching, according to experts. One study estimates that students may lose five to nine months of learning by July 2021, on average. Students of color could fall six to twelve months behind. For those from economically disadvantaged families, the results compound. Principal Keith Carrington of North Division High School said "There's been an uptick of violence in our homes. More students calling to say they're depressed. A lot of calls from parents who say they're at their wits' end. Racial unrest. Families going without food." Also, while suburban school districts have returned to in-person instruction, with some offering a mix of in-person and online learning, classes in Milwaukee public schools have remained virtual as of January 2021.

The Centers for Disease Control released a study at the end of January 2021 covering the period August 29, 2020 through November 29, 2020 for 17 schools covering Kindergarten through grade 12 in Wood County, Wisconsin.

=== Politics and elections ===
The 2020 Democratic National Convention was originally scheduled for July 13–16 in Milwaukee at the Fiserv Forum arena, was but postponed to August 17–20 on April 2.

In Wisconsin, the April 7 election for a state Supreme Court seat, the federal presidential primaries for both the Democratic and Republican parties, and several other judicial and local elections went ahead as scheduled.

Due to the pandemic, at least fifteen other U.S. states canceled or postponed scheduled elections or primaries at the time of Wisconsin's election. With Wisconsin grappling with their own pandemic, state Democratic lawmakers made several attempts to postpone their election, but were prevented by other Republican legislators. Governor Tony Evers called the Wisconsin legislature into a special session on April 4, but the Republican-controlled Assembly and Senate gaveled their sessions in and out within seventeen seconds. In a joint statement afterward, Wisconsin's state Assembly Speaker Robin Vos and Senate Majority Leader Scott Fitzgerald criticized Evers for attempting to postpone the election, for not calling a special session earlier, and for reversing his previous position on keeping the election date intact.

On April 6, Evers attempted to move the election by an executive order, but was blocked by the Wisconsin Supreme Court. On the same day, a separate effort to extend the deadline for mailing absentee ballots was blocked by the Supreme Court of the United States in a 5–4 vote. In her dissent, Justice Ruth Bader Ginsburg warned that the ruling "will result in massive disenfranchisement." The only major concession achieved was that absentee ballots postmarked by April 7 at 8 p.m. would be accepted until April 13. However, local media outlets reported that many voters had not received their requested absentee ballots by election day or, due to social distancing, were unable to satisfy a legal requirement that they obtain a witness's signature.

Lawmakers' decision to not delay the election was sharply criticized by the editorial board of the local Milwaukee Journal-Sentinel, which had previously endorsed the Republican former governor Scott Walker. They called the election "the most undemocratic in the state's history." The New York Times characterized the election as "almost certain to be tarred as illegitimate," adding that the inability of the state's lawmakers to come to an agreement on moving the election was "an epic and predictable failure." The newspaper placed the political maneuvering as part of another chapter in "a decade of bitter partisan wrangling that saw [state Republicans] clinically attack and defang the state's Democratic institutions, starting with organized labor and continuing with voting laws making it far harder for poor and black residents of urban areas to vote." Republicans believed that holding the election on April 7, when Democratic-leaning urban areas were hard-hit by the pandemic, would help secure them political advantages like a continued 5–2 conservative majority on the Wisconsin Supreme Court (through the elected seat of Daniel Kelly).

When the election went ahead on April 7, access to easy in-person voting heavily depended on the area. In smaller or more rural communities, few issues were reported. In more urbanized areas, the pandemic forced the closure and consolidation of many polling places around the state despite the use of 2,500 National Guard members to combat a severe shortage in poll workers. The effects were felt most heavily in Milwaukee, the state's largest city with the largest minority population and the center of the state's ongoing pandemic. The city's government was only able to open 5 of 180 polling stations after being short by nearly 1,000 poll workers. As a result, lengthy lines were reported, with some voters waiting for up to 2.5 hours and through rain showers. The lines disproportionately affected Milwaukee's large Hispanic and African-American population; the latter had already been disproportionately affected by the coronavirus pandemic, forming nearly half of Wisconsin's documented cases and over half its deaths at the time the vote was conducted. However, by the time the election concluded, Milwaukee Election Commissioner Neil Albrecht stated that despite some of the problems, the in-person voting ran smoothly.

Similar problems with poll station closures and long lines were reported in Waukesha, where only one polling station was opened for a city of 70,000, and Green Bay, where only 17 poll workers out of 270 were able to work. Other cities were able to keep lines much shorter, including the state capital of Madison, which opened about two-thirds of its usual polling locations, and Appleton, which opened all of its usual 15.

Voters across the state were advised to maintain social distancing, wear face masks, and bring their own pens. Robin Vos, the state Assembly Speaker, served as an election inspector for in-person voting on April 7. While wearing medical-like personal protective equipment, he told reporters that it was "incredibly safe to go out" and vote, adding that voters faced "minimal exposure."

By mid-April, health officials in Milwaukee identified at least seven new cases of COVID-19 that appear to be linked to the April 7 election; Six voters and one poll worker. Advocates of vote-by-mail say Wisconsin's experience should be a warning to other states, saying this could be "the tip of the iceberg."

=== Sports ===
Most of the state's sports teams were affected. Several leagues began postponing or suspending their seasons starting March 12. Major League Baseball cancelled the remainder of spring training on that date, and on March 16, they announced that the season will be postponed indefinitely, after the recommendations from the CDC to restrict events of more than 50 people for the next eight weeks, affecting the Milwaukee Brewers. Also on March 12, the National Basketball Association announced the season would be suspended for 30 days, affecting the Milwaukee Bucks.

In college sports, the National Collegiate Athletic Association (NCAA) canceled all winter and spring tournaments, most notably the Division I men's and women's basketball tournaments, affecting colleges and universities statewide. On March 16, the National Junior College Athletic Association also canceled the remainder of the winter seasons as well as the spring seasons. On August 5, the NCAA cancelled all Division II and Division III fall championships, impacting a number of universities statewide. On August 11, the Big Ten Conference postponed all fall sports, affecting the Wisconsin Badgers.

== Gallery ==
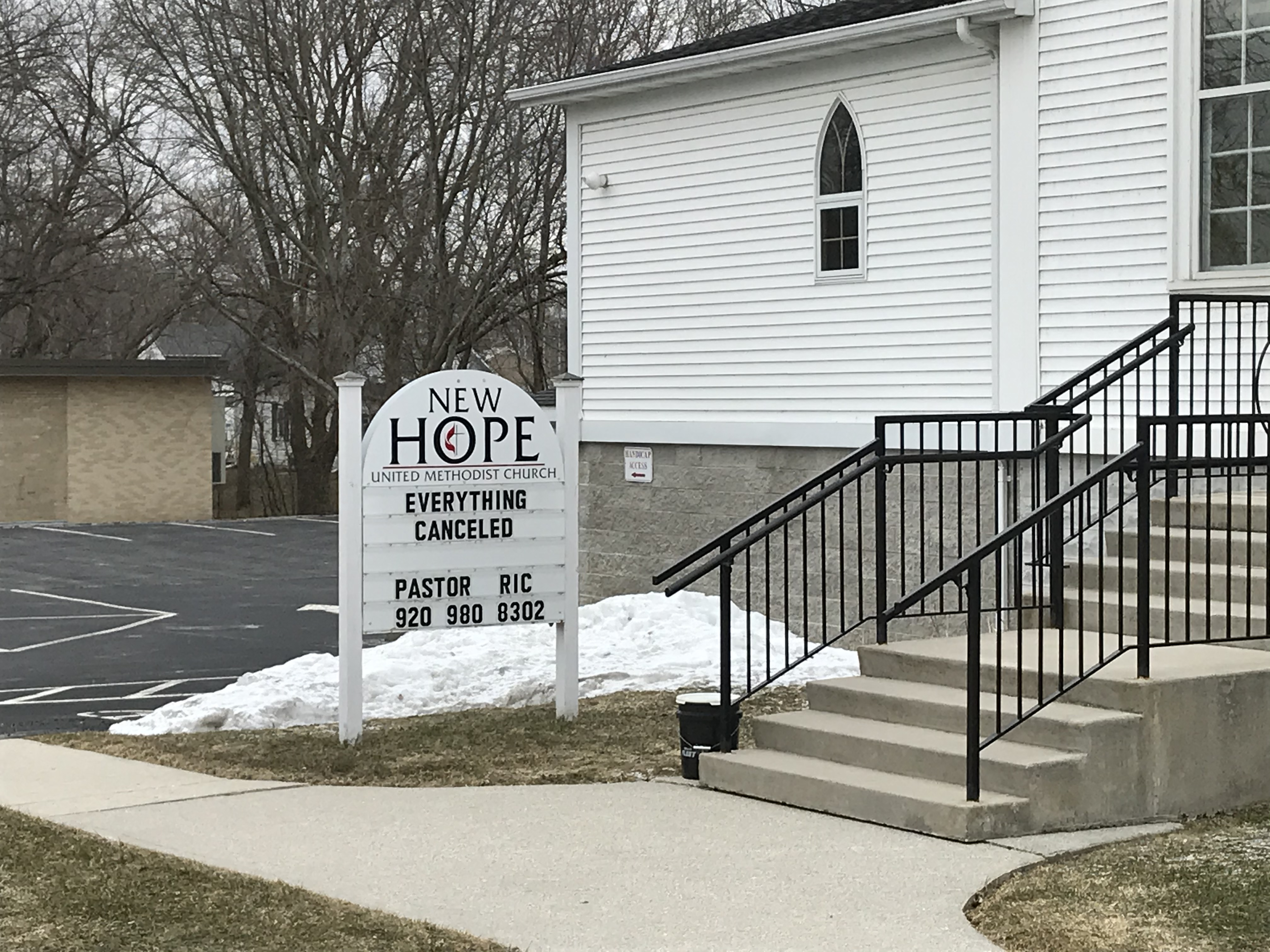
A sign outside a church in Greenbush indicates the church's closing during the pandemic.

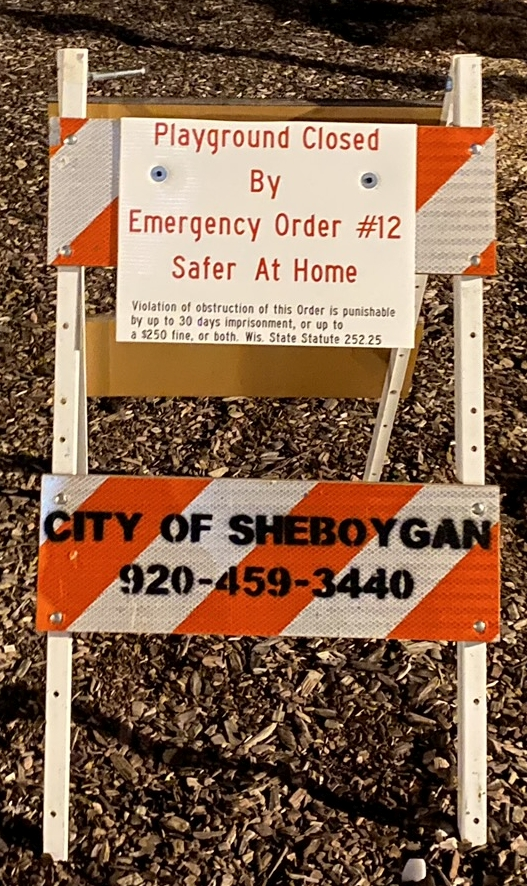
A sign upon a traffic barricade in front of a playground in Sheboygan notifies the public that the equipment is closed due to Evers's stay-at-home order, and of the consequences for violating it.

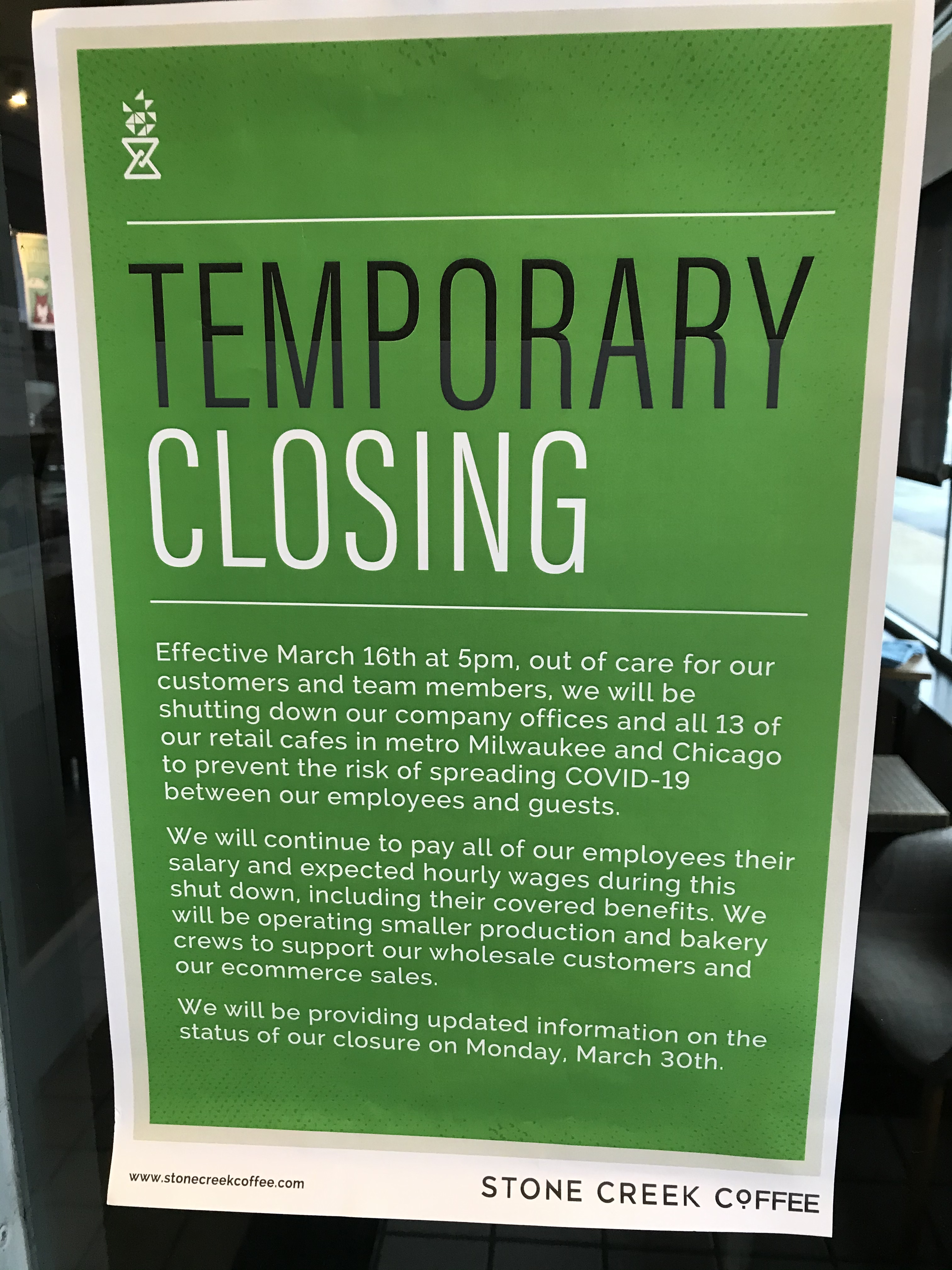
A sign for a Milwaukee/Chicago coffee shop chain in their Oconomowoc location indicates that the business has closed, their manufacturing operations will be unaffected, and employees will continue to be paid (the closure date on the sign has since extended further to the end of the stay-at-home order).

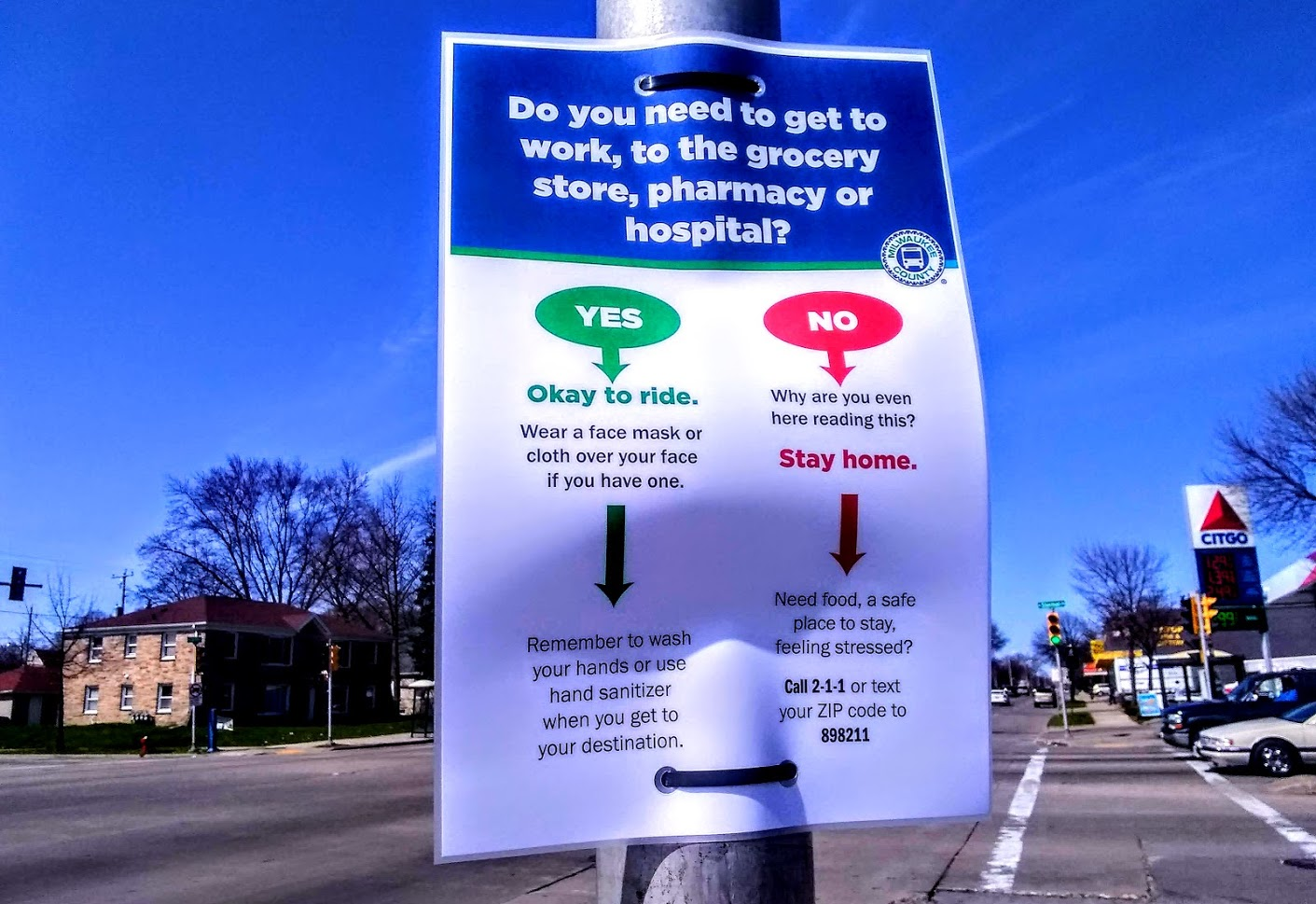
A card posted at a Milwaukee County Transit System bus stop regarding essential riding. A number of state transit systems, including MCTS, City of Madison Metro Transit, Green Bay Metro, and Sheboygan's Shoreline Metro have suspended fares, reduced capacity to enforce social distancing and board passengers through only the rear bus doors during the pandemic to reduce driver contact to only that involving passengers needing assistive services and accommodations.

== See also ==
- Timeline of the COVID-19 pandemic in the United States
- COVID-19 pandemic in the United States – for impact on the country
- COVID-19 pandemic – for impact on other countries
- U.S. state and local government responses to the COVID-19 pandemic
