= Adam Jarchow =

American politician (born 1978)

Member of the Wisconsin State Assembly from the 28th district
- In office January 5, 2015 – January 7, 2019
- Preceded by: Erik Severson
- Succeeded by: Gae Magnafici

Member of the Board of Supervisors of Polk County, Wisconsin, from the 6th district
- Incumbent
- Assumed office April 2026
- Preceded by: Dan Ruck

Personal details
- Born: November 10, 1978 (age 47) Saint Paul, Minnesota, U.S.
- Party: Republican
- Spouse: Barbara
- Children: 2
- Education: University of Florida (BS, JD)

Adam Michael Jarchow (/ˈdʒɑːrkoʊ/ JAR-koh; born November 10, 1978) is an American attorney and Republican politician from Polk County, Wisconsin. He served two terms in the Wisconsin State Assembly, representing the 28th Assembly district in northwest Wisconsin. He was an unsuccessful candidate for Attorney General of Wisconsin in the 2022 Republican primary, and subsequently was elected to the county board in Polk County.

== Early life and career ==
Adam Jarchow was born in Saint Paul, Minnesota, on November 10, 1978. During his childhood he attended school in Clear Lake, Wisconsin and graduated from Clear Lake High School in 1997. Over the next four years he attended the University of Florida, graduating with his bachelors' of science in 2001. He then attended the University of Florida College of Law, where he obtained his Juris Doctor and was admitted to the Florida Bar in 2004.

After obtaining his degree, Jarchow set up a practice in Florida and later Minnesota, eventually moving back to Wisconsin and practicing law in New Richmond, Wisconsin.

In 2017, Jarchow set up his own legal practice.

== Political career ==
On November 4, 2014, Jarchow was elected to the Wisconsin State Assembly as a Republican.

In 2016, Jarchow proposed legislation that would dissolve the Wisconsin Department of Natural Resources and split its duties between various departments.

In 2017 Jarchow voted against the Foxconn deal alongside fellow Republican Todd Novak and 29 Democrats.

Following the resignation of Republican Sheila Harsdorf from the State Senate, Jarchow announced a campaign to succeed her in the special election. He was followed by Republican and fellow state representative Shannon Zimmerman. During the campaign, Jarchow criticized Zimmerman over allegations he did not reside in his assembly district. In response, Jarchow was criticized by Zimmerman for voting against the 2017 opposing the Foxconn deal. Jarchow defeated Zimmerman by a 12 point margin. Jarchow was defeated by Democrat Patty Schachtner in what was considered an upset victory. Due to his defeat in the senate special election, Jarchow declined to seek re-election to his senate seat in the fall.

In October 2021, Jarchow announced he would be seeking the Republican nomination for attorney general of Wisconsin in the 2022 election, seeking to challenge incumbent Democrat Josh Kaul. Jarchow faced two other candidates in the primary, Fond du Lac County District Attorney Eric Toney and attorney Karen Mueller. During the campaign he ran a right wing campaign on national issues, such as criticizing transgender athletes, opposing the "Madison Swamp," and supporting Kyle Rittenhouse. He was opposed by Toney, who ran a more moderate campaign and touted his experience as a prosecutor for Fond du Lac County. Throughout the primary, Jarchow and Toney agreed on expanding gun rights to nonviolent felons, and all three Republican candidates agreed on implementing tough-on-crime policies if elected, as well as prosecuting cases of election fraud and investigating false allegations that the 2020 election was fraudulent. Additionally, Jarchow criticized Toney for his decision to temporarily enforce Wisconsin's stay-at-home orders during the COVID-19 pandemic. Jarchow outspent Toney nearly 5-to-1 during the course of the primary. He was defeated by Toney by a nearly half-point margin.

== Personal life ==
Jarchow is married to Barbara Jarchow, whom he met while attending University of Florida College of Law, and lives in Balsam Lake, Wisconsin with their two children.

== Electoral history ==
=== Wisconsin Assembly (2014, 2016) ===
Year	Election	Date	Elected				Defeated				Total	Plurality
2014	General	Nov. 4	Adam Jarchow	Republican	12,747	62.23%	Travis Schachtner	Dem.	7,736	37.77%	20,484	5,011
2016	General	Nov. 8	Adam Jarchow (inc)	Republican	17,612	60.66%	Jeff Peterson	Dem.	9,837	33.88%	29,032	7,775
2016	General	Nov. 8	Adam Jarchow (inc)	Republican	17,612	60.66%	Vincent Zilka	Ind.	1,580	5.44%	29,032	7,775

=== Wisconsin Senate (2018) ===
Year	Election	Date	Elected				Defeated				Total	Plurality
2018 (special)	Primary	Dec. 19 (2017)	Adam Jarchow	Republican	4,023	55.94%	Shannon Zimmerman	Rep.	3,161	43.95%	7,192	862
2018 (special)	Special	Jan. 16	Patty Schachtner	Democratic	12,249	54.60%	Adam Jarchow	Rep.	9,909	44.17%	28,427	2,340
2018 (special)	Special	Jan. 16	Patty Schachtner	Democratic	12,249	54.60%	Brian J. Corriea	Lib.	273	1.22%	28,427	2,340

=== Attorney General (2022) ===
Year	Election	Date	Elected				Defeated				Total	Plurality
2022	Primary	Aug. 9	Eric Toney	Republican	222,902	37.35%	Adam Jarchow	Rep.	220,045	36.87%	596,828	2,857
2022	Primary	Aug. 9	Eric Toney	Republican	222,902	37.35%	Karen Mueller	Rep.	152,581	25.57%	596,828	2,857
