= Lowell A. Nelson =

American politician

Lowell A. Nelson (February 4, 1918 – August 8, 1986) was a member of the Wisconsin State Assembly.

== Biography ==
Nelson was born on February 4, 1918, in Grantsburg, Wisconsin. He became a farmer.

== Political career ==
Nelson was a member of the Assembly from 1957 to 1958. He was a Republican.
