= David E. Paulson =

American politician

David Earl Paulson (September 13, 1931 – January 17, 2015) was an American legislator in the Wisconsin State Assembly.

Born in Nye, Wisconsin, Paulson graduated from Osceola High School and served in the United States Navy during the Korean War. Paulson was married with two children.

A Republican, Paulson was first elected to the Assembly in 1978. Additionally, he was Chairman of the town of Black Brook, Wisconsin from 1967 to 1979 and a member of the Polk County, Wisconsin Board of Supervisors from 1968 to 1972. He lived in Amery, Wisconsin and died at the age of 83.
