= Deronda, Wisconsin =

- Unincorporated community
- Location within Wisconsin Location within the United States
- Coordinates: 45°18′13″N 92°25′42″W
- Country: United States
- State: Wisconsin
- County: Polk
- Elevation: 1,070 ft (330 m)
- Time zone: UTC-6 (Central (CST))
  - Summer (DST): UTC-5 (CDT)
- Area codes: 715 & 534
- GNIS feature ID: 1563913

Deronda is an unincorporated community located in the town of Lincoln, Polk County, Wisconsin, United States. Deronda is 3 miles (4.8 km) west of Amery.
