= Robert M. Dueholm =

American politician

Robert M. Dueholm is a former member of the Wisconsin State Assembly.

== Biography ==
Dueholm was born on June 7, 1945, in Frederic, Wisconsin. He graduated from high school in Luck, Wisconsin, before graduating from the University of Wisconsin-River Falls and the University of Wisconsin-Madison. Dueholm is married with two children and is a member of the local chapter of the Humane Society of the United States and Pheasants Forever.

== Career ==
Dueholm was first elected to the Assembly in 1994. He is a Democrat.
