= Luck, Wisconsin =

- Village
- Location of Luck in Polk County, Wisconsin.
- Coordinates: 45°35′56″N 92°29′12″W
- Country: United States
- State: Wisconsin
- County: Polk

Area
  - Total: 2.58 sq mi (6.68 km^{2})
  - Land: 1.97 sq mi (5.11 km^{2})
  - Water: 0.61 sq mi (1.57 km^{2})
- Elevation: 1,224 ft (373 m)

Population (2020)
  - Total: 1,093
  - Density: 554/sq mi (214/km^{2})
- Time zone: UTC-6 (Central (CST))
  - Summer (DST): UTC-5 (CDT)
- Area codes: 715 & 534
- FIPS code: 55-46225
- GNIS feature ID: 1568786
- Website: Village of Luck

Luck is a village in Polk County, Wisconsin, United States. The population was 1,093 at the 2020 census.

== History ==
Luck was originally two settlements, Luck on Big Butternut Lake, and West Denmark further west, founded by Danish immigrants in 1869 on the north and west shores of Little Butternut Lake and extending out a few miles. The two settlements knew it was impractical to remain separate entities, but disagreed about which would be the center of town. The railroad settled the issue when it laid tracks near the eastern settlement. Luck was not incorporated until 1905, several years later than most surrounding villages. Luck was once home to the Duncan Toys Company Yo-Yo factory headquarters.

== Geography ==
Luck is located at 45°34′13″N 92°28′29″W (45.570499, -92.47476).

According to the United States Census Bureau, the village has an area of 2.50 square miles (6.47 km^{2}), of which 1.89 square miles (4.90 km^{2}) is land and 0.61 square miles (1.58 km^{2}) is water.

Luck is along Wisconsin Highways 35 and 48 and Polk County Road N. County Road B is nearby.

=== Climate ===
Luck has a humid continental climate (Köppen Dfb), with short, warm summers, and long, very cold winters. Luck has a mean annual temperature of 44.8F. The coldest month is January with an average daily high of 23 degrees and an average daily low of 4 degrees. The warmest month is July with an average daily high of 81 degrees and an average daily low of 59 degrees. Accumulating snowfall can happen anytime from November to April on average.

Climate data for Luck, Wisconsin (1991–2020 normals, extremes 1971–present)
Month	Jan	Feb	Mar	Apr	May	Jun	Jul	Aug	Sep	Oct	Nov	Dec	Year
Record high °F (°C)	52 (11)	59 (15)	80 (27)	89 (32)	93 (34)	97 (36)	101 (38)	100 (38)	96 (36)	87 (31)	73 (23)	61 (16)	101 (38)
Mean daily maximum °F (°C)	22.0 (−5.6)	27.5 (−2.5)	40.4 (4.7)	55.3 (12.9)	68.1 (20.1)	76.9 (24.9)	80.8 (27.1)	78.7 (25.9)	71.2 (21.8)	57.0 (13.9)	40.2 (4.6)	27.2 (−2.7)	53.8 (12.1)
Daily mean °F (°C)	13.3 (−10.4)	17.9 (−7.8)	30.7 (−0.7)	44.4 (6.9)	57.0 (13.9)	66.3 (19.1)	70.4 (21.3)	68.3 (20.2)	60.8 (16.0)	47.6 (8.7)	32.7 (0.4)	19.8 (−6.8)	44.1 (6.7)
Mean daily minimum °F (°C)	4.6 (−15.2)	8.4 (−13.1)	21.0 (−6.1)	33.6 (0.9)	45.9 (7.7)	55.6 (13.1)	60.0 (15.6)	58.0 (14.4)	50.4 (10.2)	38.1 (3.4)	25.1 (−3.8)	12.4 (−10.9)	34.4 (1.3)
Record low °F (°C)	−43 (−42)	−38 (−39)	−23 (−31)	−1 (−18)	20 (−7)	32 (0)	39 (4)	33 (1)	22 (−6)	9 (−13)	−21 (−29)	−44 (−42)	−44 (−42)
Average precipitation inches (mm)	0.81 (21)	0.83 (21)	1.49 (38)	2.71 (69)	4.21 (107)	4.18 (106)	4.34 (110)	4.28 (109)	3.57 (91)	3.41 (87)	1.89 (48)	1.17 (30)	32.89 (835)
Average snowfall inches (cm)	9.8 (25)	12.6 (32)	9.0 (23)	4.6 (12)	0.2 (0.51)	0.0 (0.0)	0.0 (0.0)	0.0 (0.0)	0.0 (0.0)	1.3 (3.3)	8.4 (21)	15.3 (39)	61.2 (155)
Average precipitation days (≥ 0.01 in)	8.0	6.8	7.5	9.8	12.0	11.9	10.5	10.5	9.9	10.5	8.1	9.1	114.6
Average snowy days (≥ 0.1 in)	7.0	5.7	3.4	1.6	0.1	0.0	0.0	0.0	0.0	0.6	3.5	7.5	29.4
Source: NOAA

== Demographics ==
Historical population
Census	Pop.	Note	%±
1910	383		—
1920	479		25.1%
1930	560		16.9%
1940	617		10.2%
1950	803		30.1%
1960	853		6.2%
1970	848		−0.6%
1980	997		17.6%
1990	1,022		2.5%
2000	1,210		18.4%
2010	1,119		−7.5%
2020	1,093		−2.3%
U.S. Decennial Census

=== 2010 census ===
As of the census of 2010, there were 1,119 people, 475 households, and 289 families living in the village. The population density was 592.1 inhabitants per square mile (228.6/km^{2}). There were 567 housing units at an average density of 300.0 per square mile (115.8/km^{2}). The racial makeup of the village was 97.2% White, 0.2% African American, 0.5% Native American, 0.1% Asian, 0.2% from other races, and 1.8% from two or more races. Hispanic or Latino of any race were 1.7% of the population.

There were 475 households, of which 28.0% had children under the age of 18 living with them, 43.4% were married couples living together, 11.6% had a female householder with no husband present, 5.9% had a male householder with no wife present, and 39.2% were non-families. 33.5% of all households were made up of individuals, and 17.7% had someone living alone who was 65 years of age or older. The average household size was 2.23 and the average family size was 2.77.

The median age in the village was 45.6 years. 20.7% of residents were under the age of 18; 7.2% were between the ages of 18 and 24; 20.9% were from 25 to 44; 27.6% were from 45 to 64; and 23.7% were 65 years of age or older. The gender makeup of the village was 49.3% male and 50.7% female.

=== 2000 census ===
As of the census of 2000, there were 1,210 people, 500 households, and 308 families living in the village. The population density was 654.2 people per square mile (252.5/km^{2}). There were 572 housing units at an average density of 309.3 per square mile (119.4/km^{2}). The racial makeup of the village was 98.26% White, 0.74% Native American, 0.33% Asian, 0.08% from other races, and 0.58% from two or more races. 0.99% of the population were Hispanic or Latino of any race.

There were 500 households, out of which 30.0% had children under the age of 18 living with them, 49.6% were married couples living together, 9.2% had a female householder with no husband present, and 38.2% were non-families. 32.2% of all households were made up of individuals, and 17.0% had someone living alone who was 65 years of age or older. The average household size was 2.27 and the average family size was 2.87.

In the village, the population was spread out, with 24.3% under the age of 18, 6.9% from 18 to 24, 26.4% from 25 to 44, 17.8% from 45 to 64, and 24.5% who were 65 years of age or older. The median age was 40 years. For every 100 females, there were 85.0 males. For every 100 females age 18 and over, there were 80.7 males.

The median income for a household in the village was $32,138, and the median income for a family was $40,000. Males had a median income of $31,250 versus $21,343 for females. The per capita income for the village was $16,599. About 5.4% of families and 8.3% of the population were below the poverty line, including 9.8% of those under age 18 and 13.1% of those age 65 or over.

== Education ==
The Luck School District serves the village.

== Notable people ==
- Matraca Berg, her grandparents had a farm near Luck and her summer visits there inspired the song "Strawberry Wine".
- Marius Dueholm, Wisconsin State Representative
- Robert M. Dueholm, Wisconsin State Representative
- Charles D. Madsen, Wisconsin State Senator
- Regina Spektor, musician, who spent the summer of 2001 working on a butterfly farm nearby
