= Wisconsin's 10th Senate district =

American legislative district in western Wisconsin

Wisconsin's 10th State Senate district
- 2024 map defined in 2023 Wisc. Act 94; 2022 map defined in Johnson v. Wisconsin Elections Commission; 2011 map was defined in 2011 Wisc. Act 43 composed of Assembly districts 28, 29, and 30
Senator
Rob Stafsholt; R–New Richmond
since January 4, 2021 (5 years, 315 days)
- Demographics: 91.99% White; 1.05% Black; 3.49% Hispanic; 1.13% Asian; 1.66% Native American; 0.1% Hawaiian/Pacific Islander
- Population (2020) • Voting age: 178,925; 136,909
- Website: Official website
- Notes: Northwest Wisconsin

The 10th Senate district of Wisconsin is one of 33 districts in the Wisconsin Senate. Located in northwest Wisconsin, the district comprises all of Buffalo, Pepin, Pierce, and St. Croix counties, along with most of Trempealeau and parts of western Dunn County. It contains the cities of Hudson, Arcadia, New Richmond, Prescott, Mondovi, Blair, Independence, Buffalo City, Fountain City, and River Falls. It also contains landmarks such as Kinnickinnic State Park, Perrot State Park, Trempealeau National Wildlife Refuge, and part of the Saint Croix National Scenic Riverway.

Northwestern portions of the 10th Senate District are located with the Minneapolis-Saint Paul Metropolitan Area.

== Current elected officials ==
Rob Stafsholt is the senator representing the 10th district. He was first elected in the 2020 general election. He previously served four years in the Wisconsin State Assembly.

Each Wisconsin State Senate district is composed of three State Assembly districts. The 10th Senate district comprises the 28th, 29th, and 30th Assembly districts. The current representatives of those districts are:

- Assembly District 28: Robin Kreibich (R–New Richmond)
- Assembly District 29: Treig Pronschinske (R–Mondovi)
- Assembly District 30: Shannon Zimmerman (R–River Falls)

Most of the 10th Senate district falls within Wisconsin's 3rd congressional district, which is represented by U.S. Representative Derrick Van Orden. The part of the district in St. Croix County falls within Wisconsin's 7th congressional district, represented by Tom Tiffany.

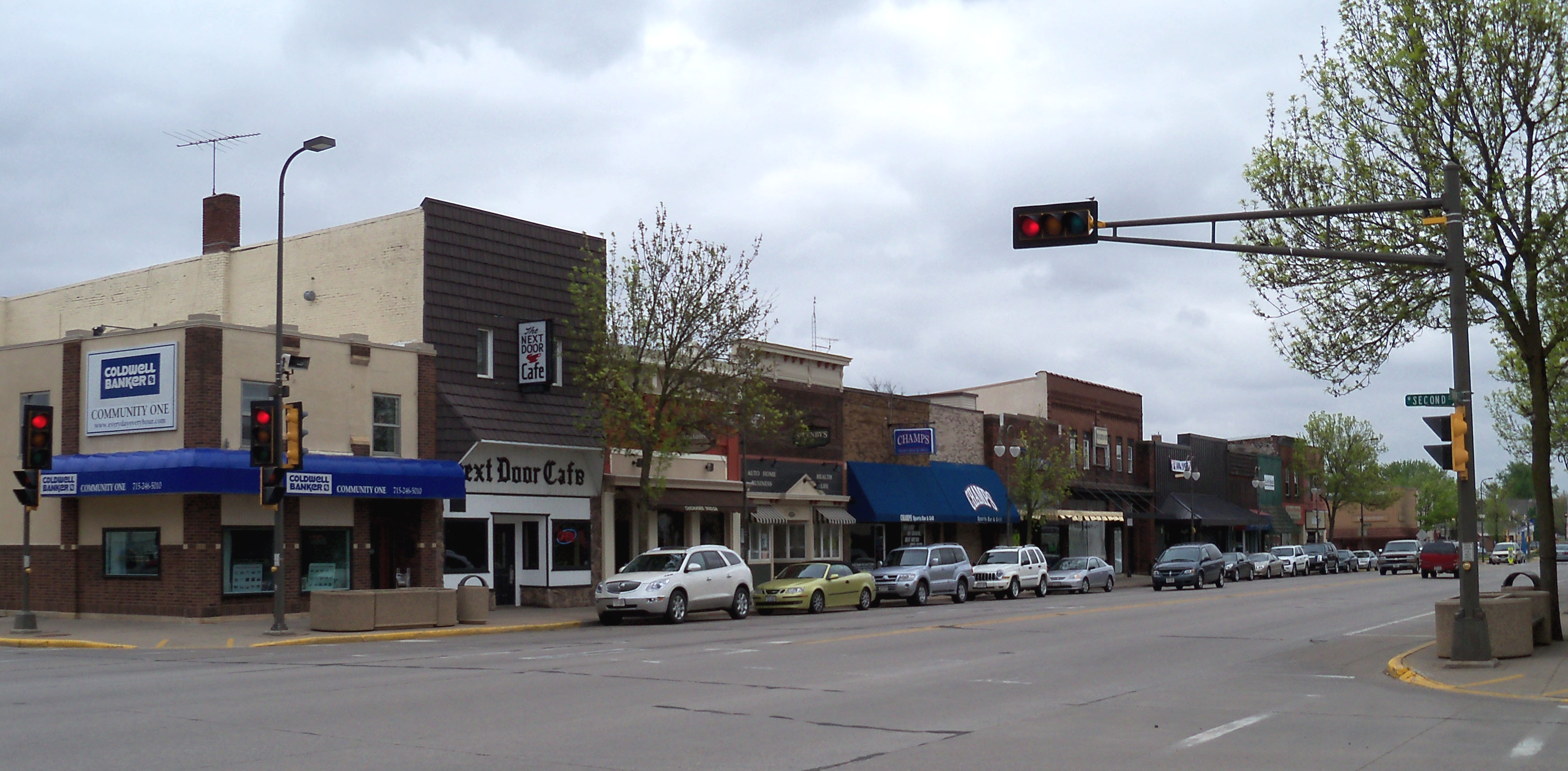
New Richmond, Wisconsin

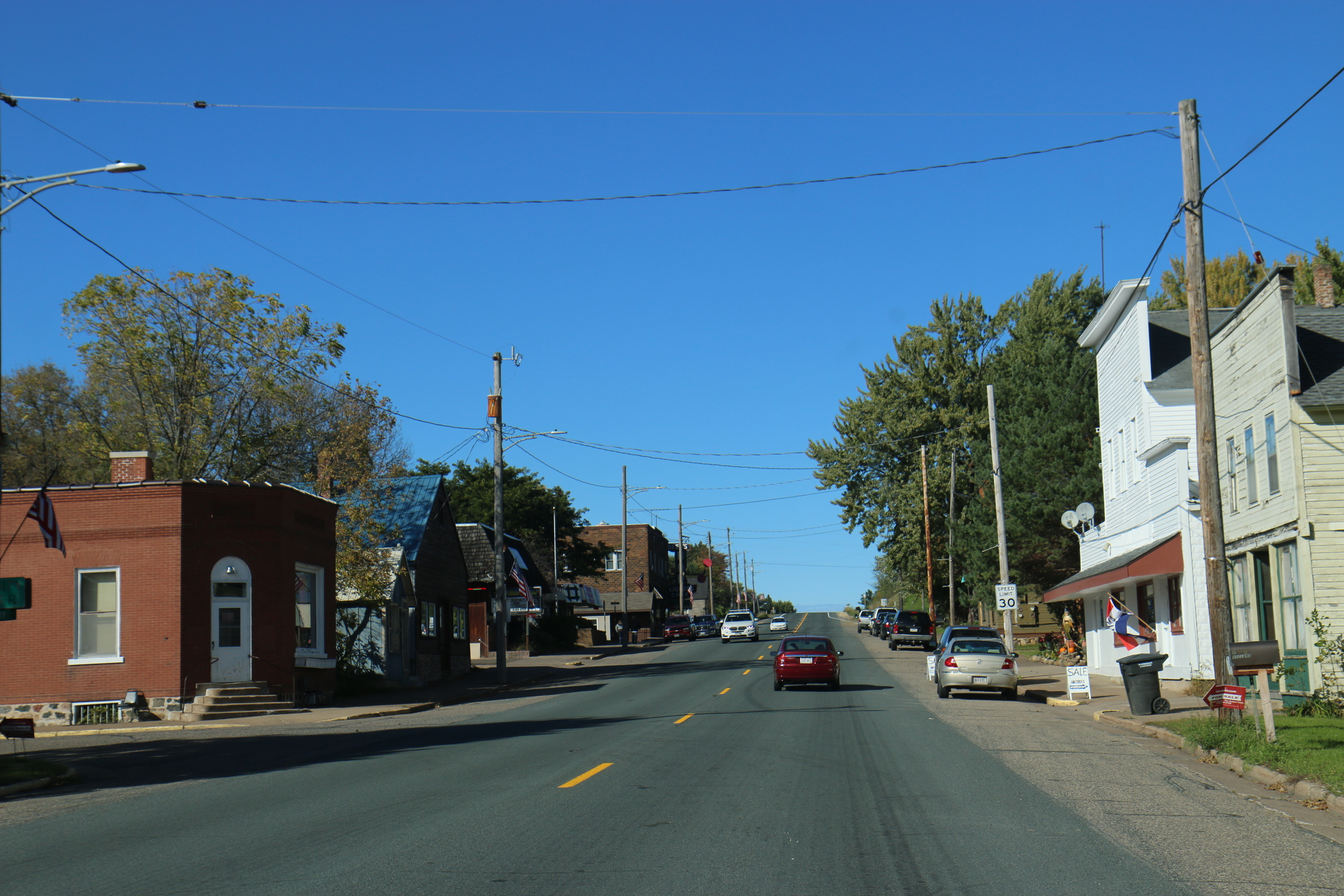
Deer Park, Wisconsin

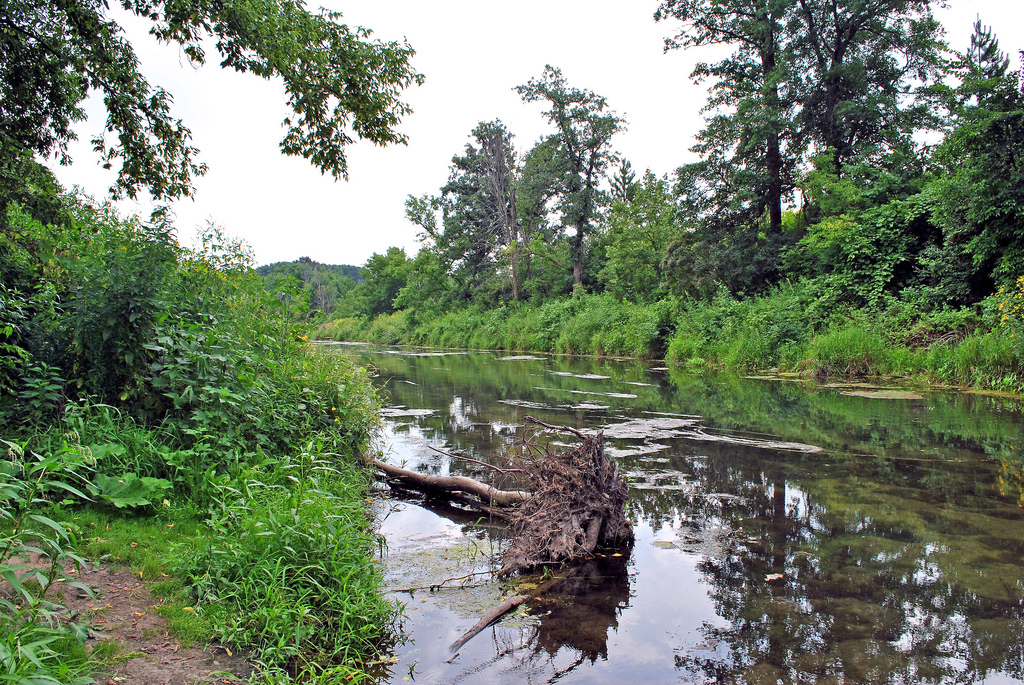
Rush River south of Baldwin

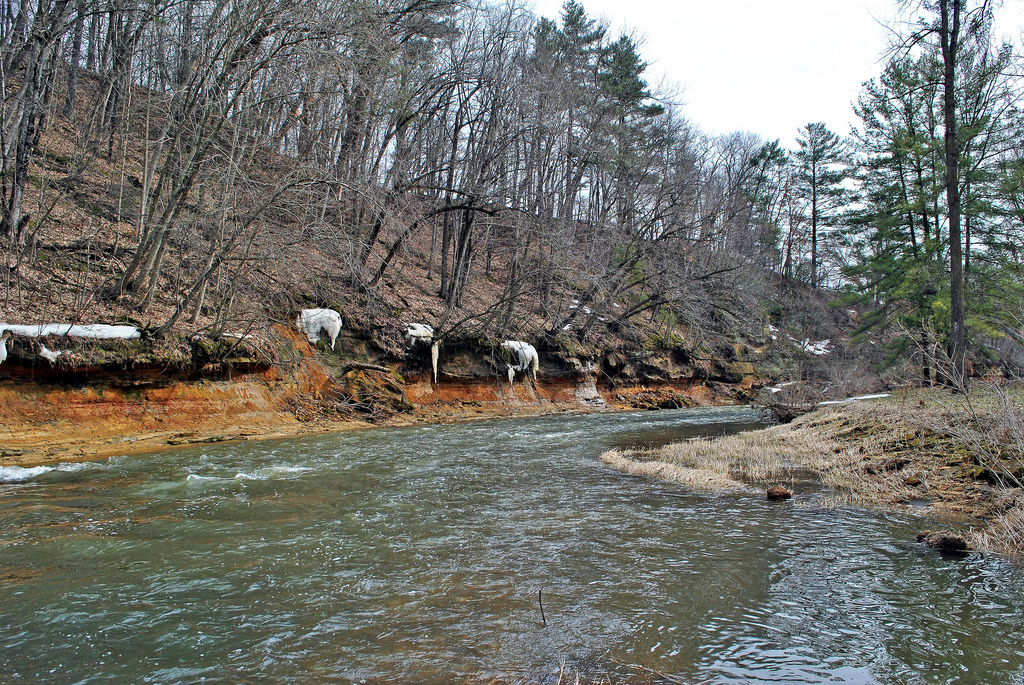
Eau Galle River in the town of Eau Galle

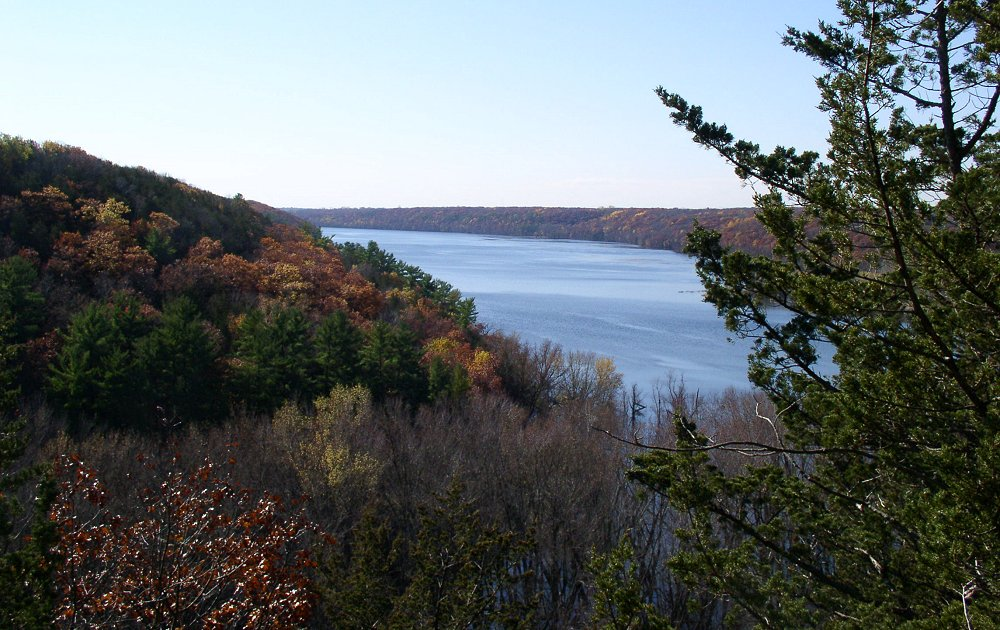
Kinnickinnic State Park.

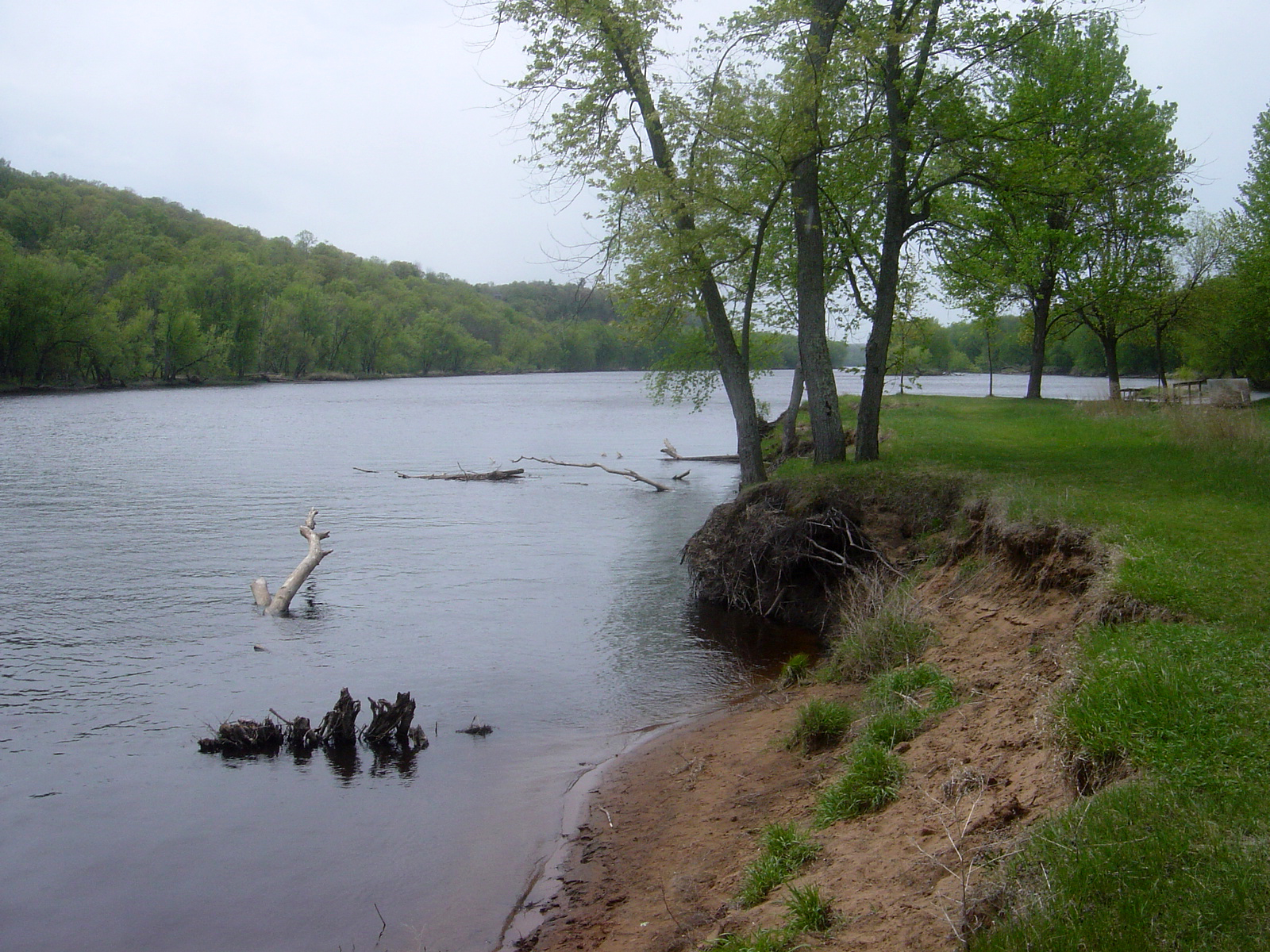
St. Croix River.

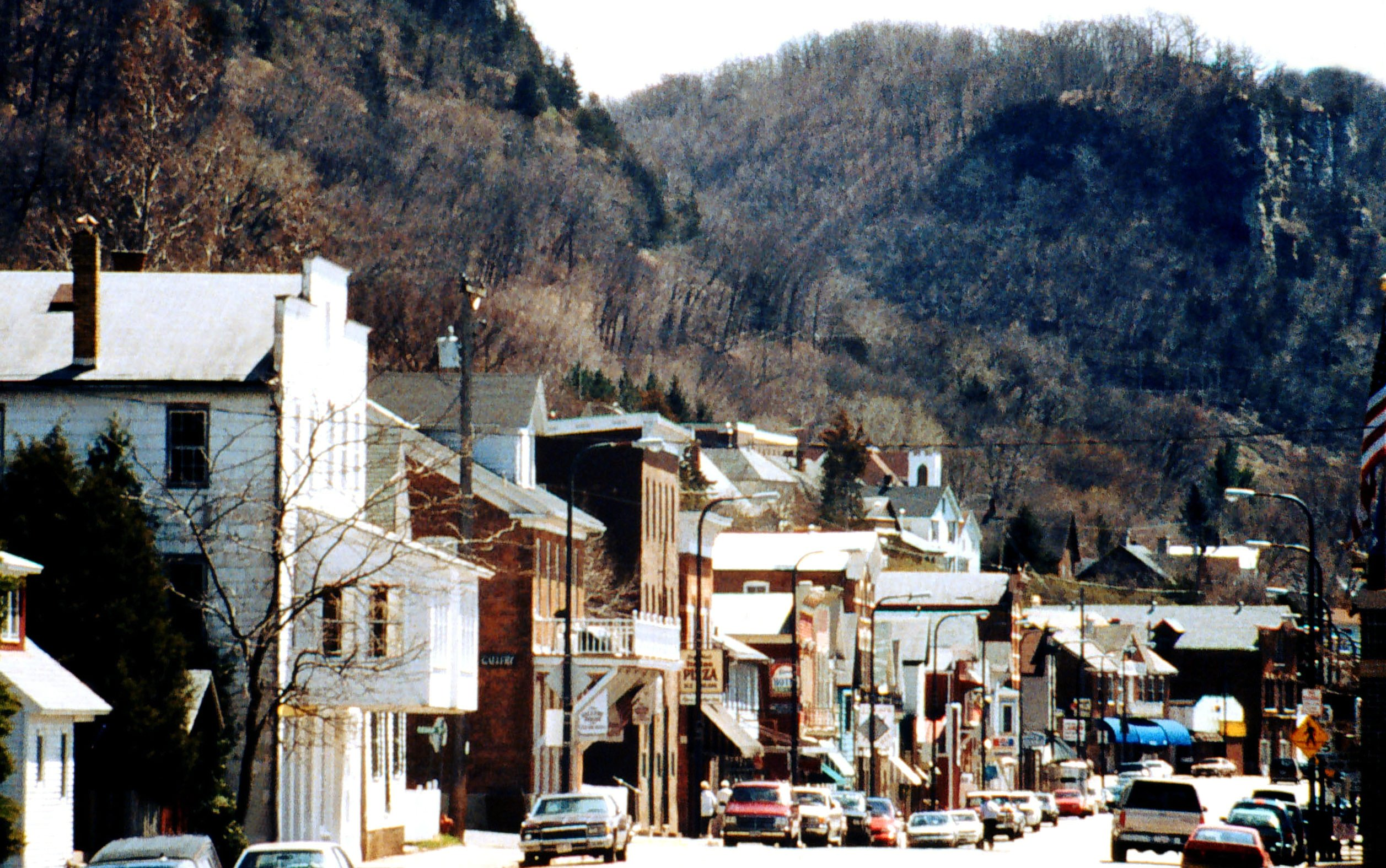
Alma Historic District

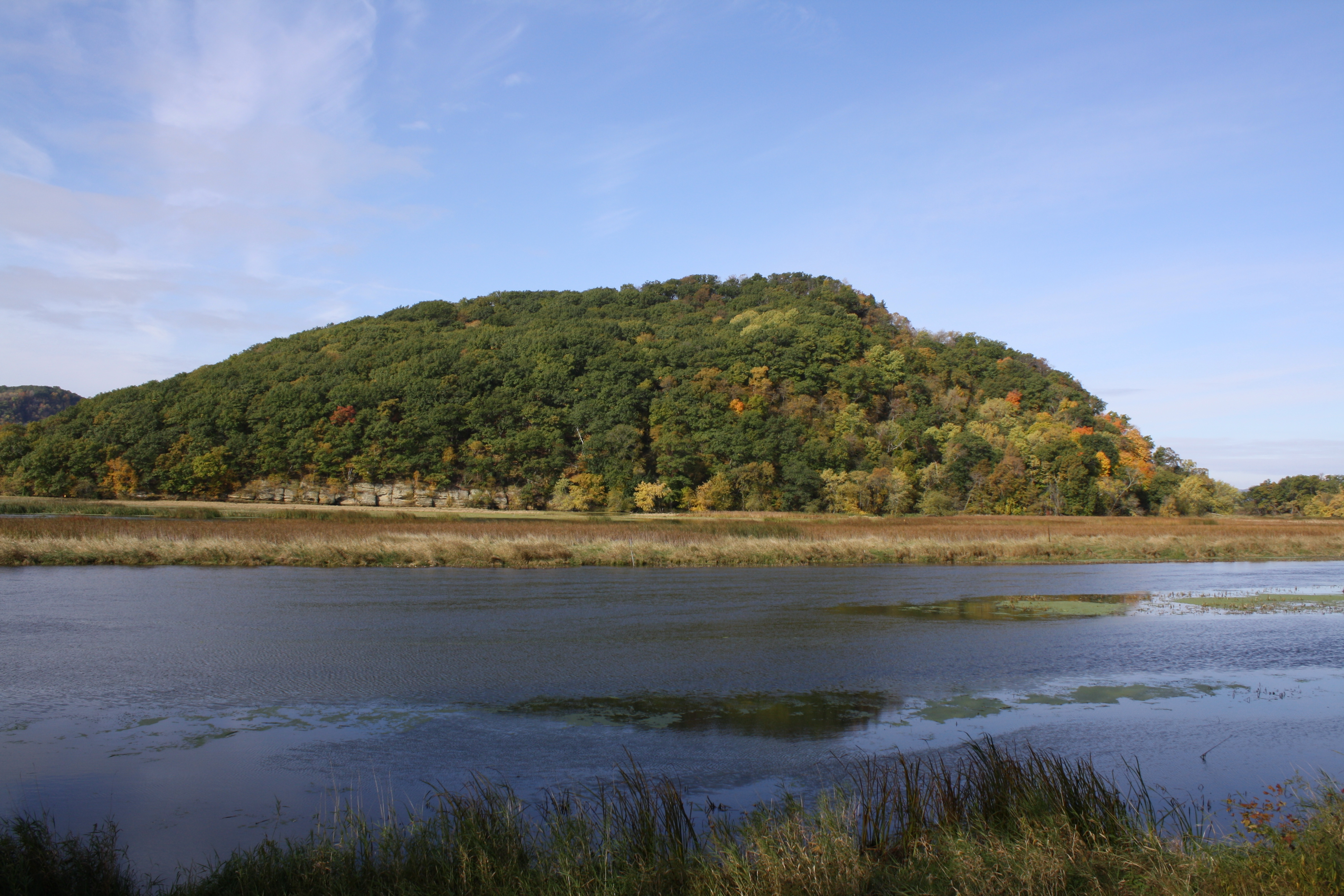
Perrot State Park.

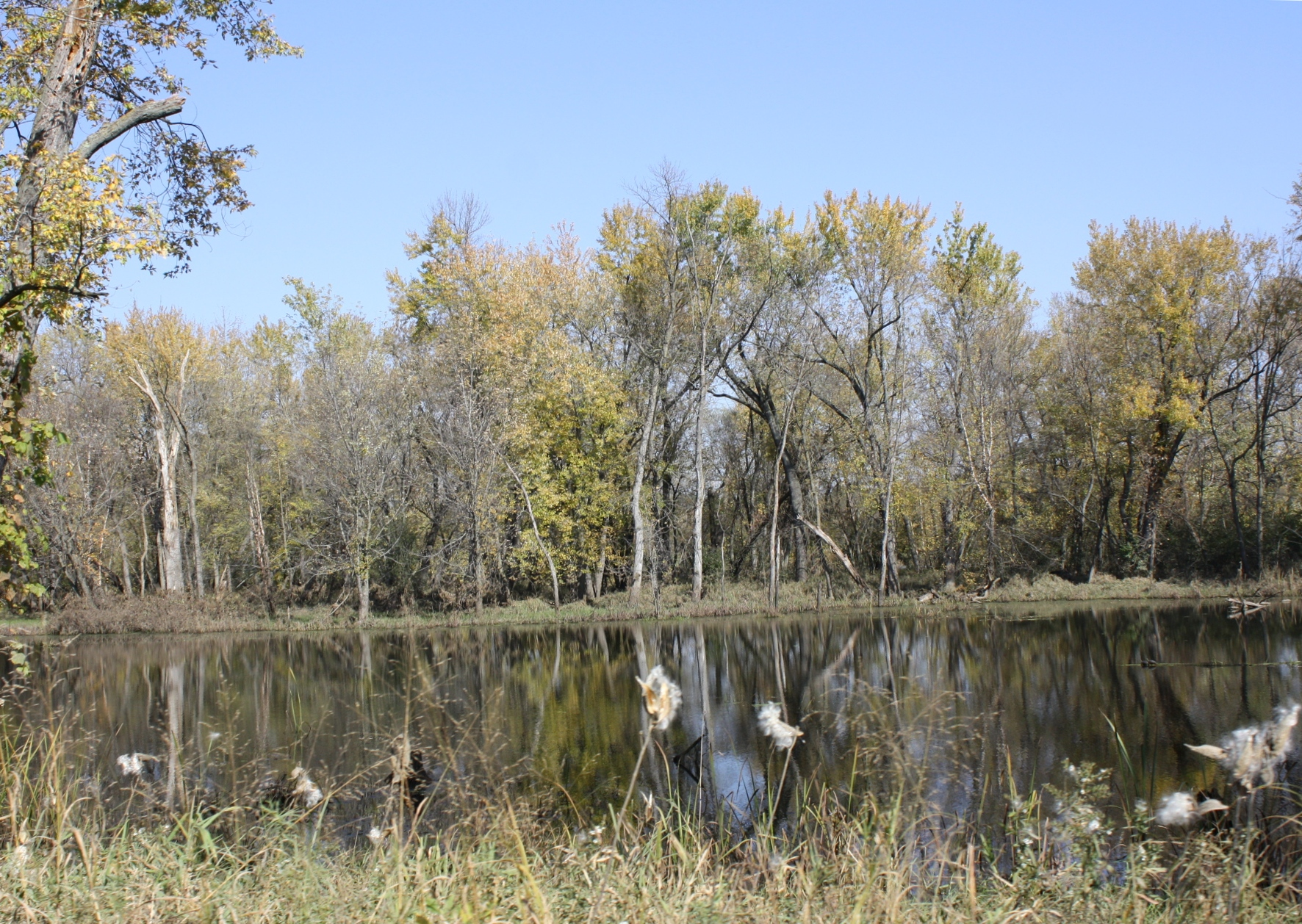
Trempealeau National Wildlife Refuge.

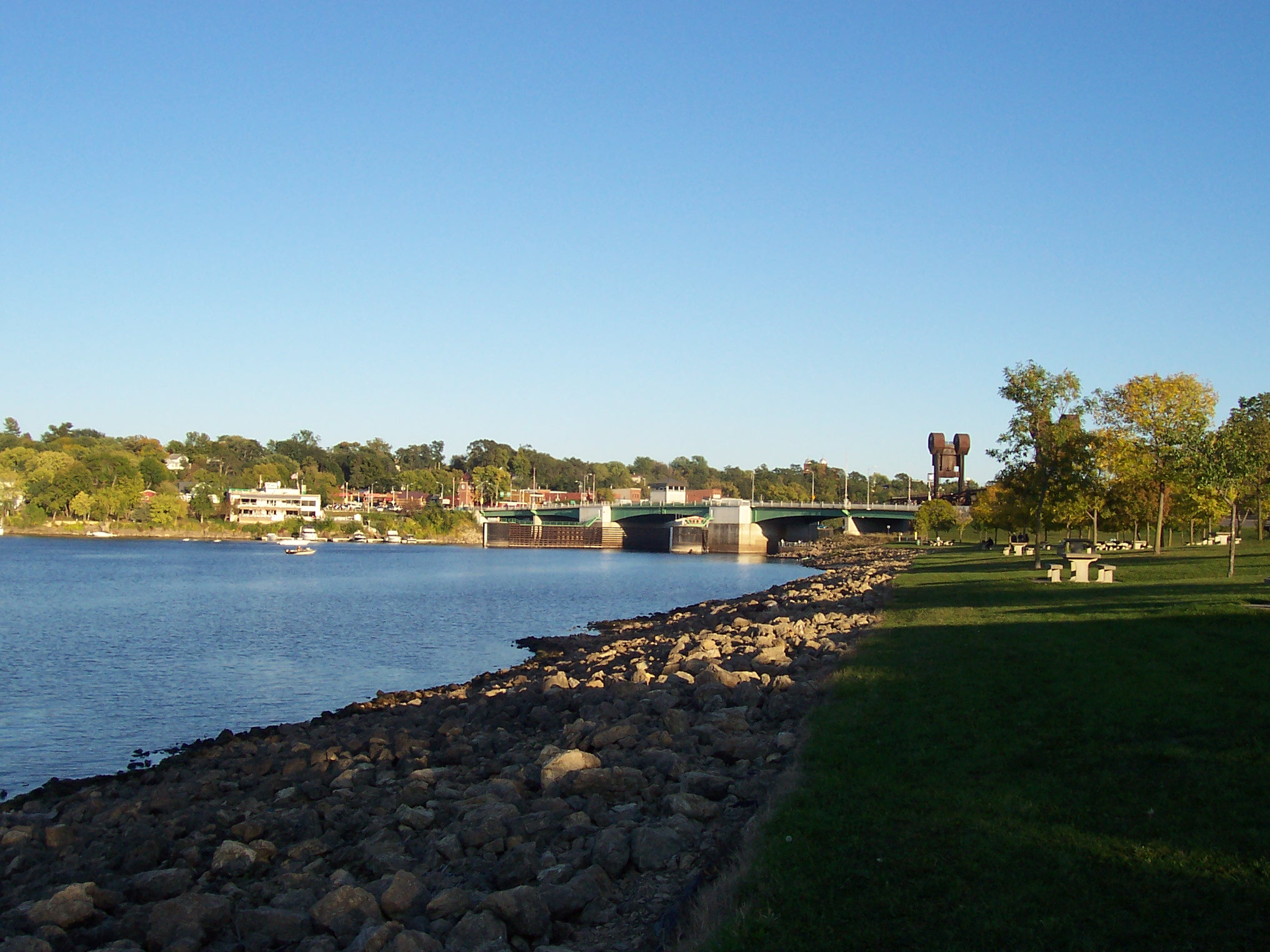
Prescott viewed from Point Douglas.

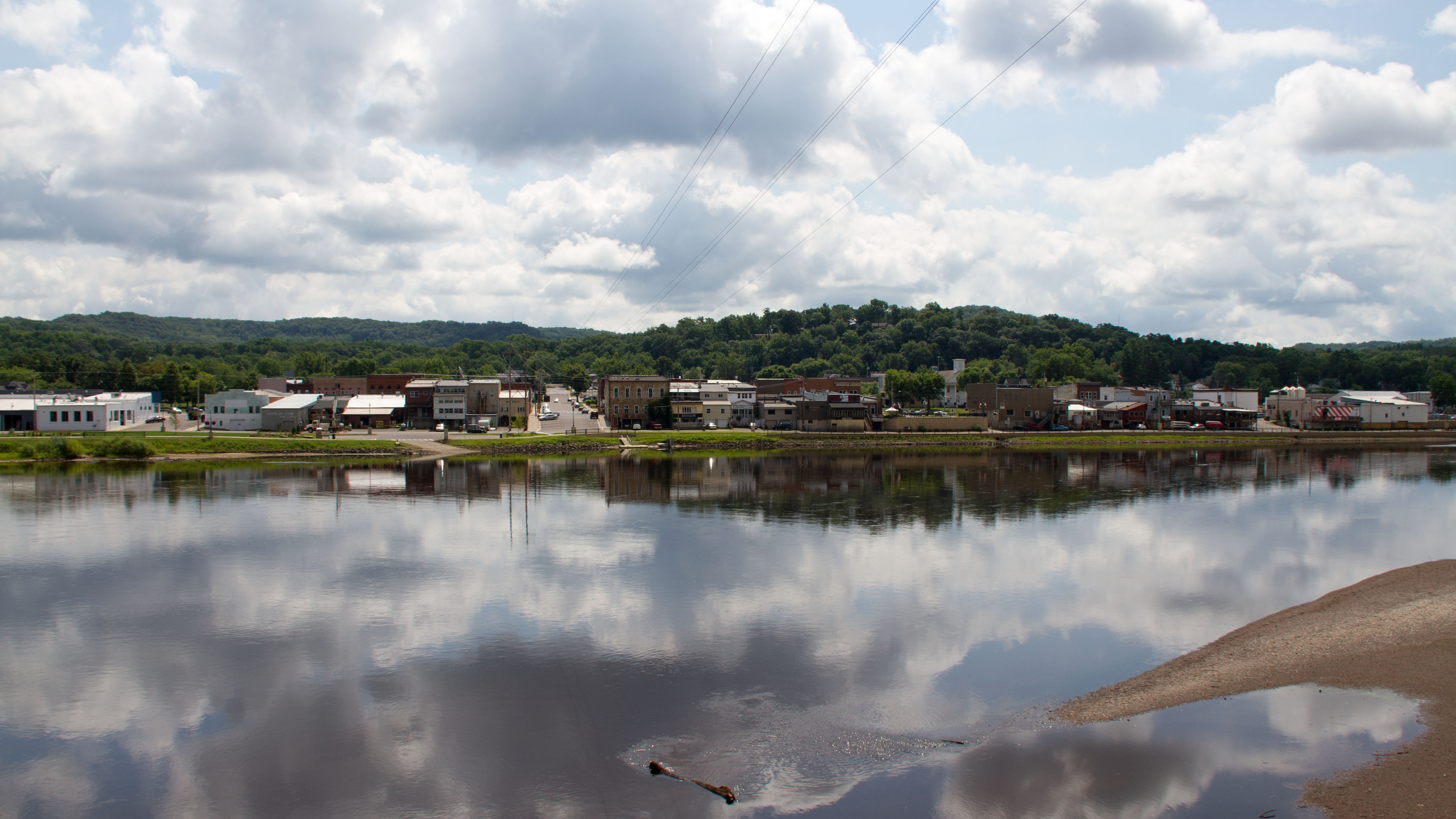
Durand viewed from across the Chippewa River.

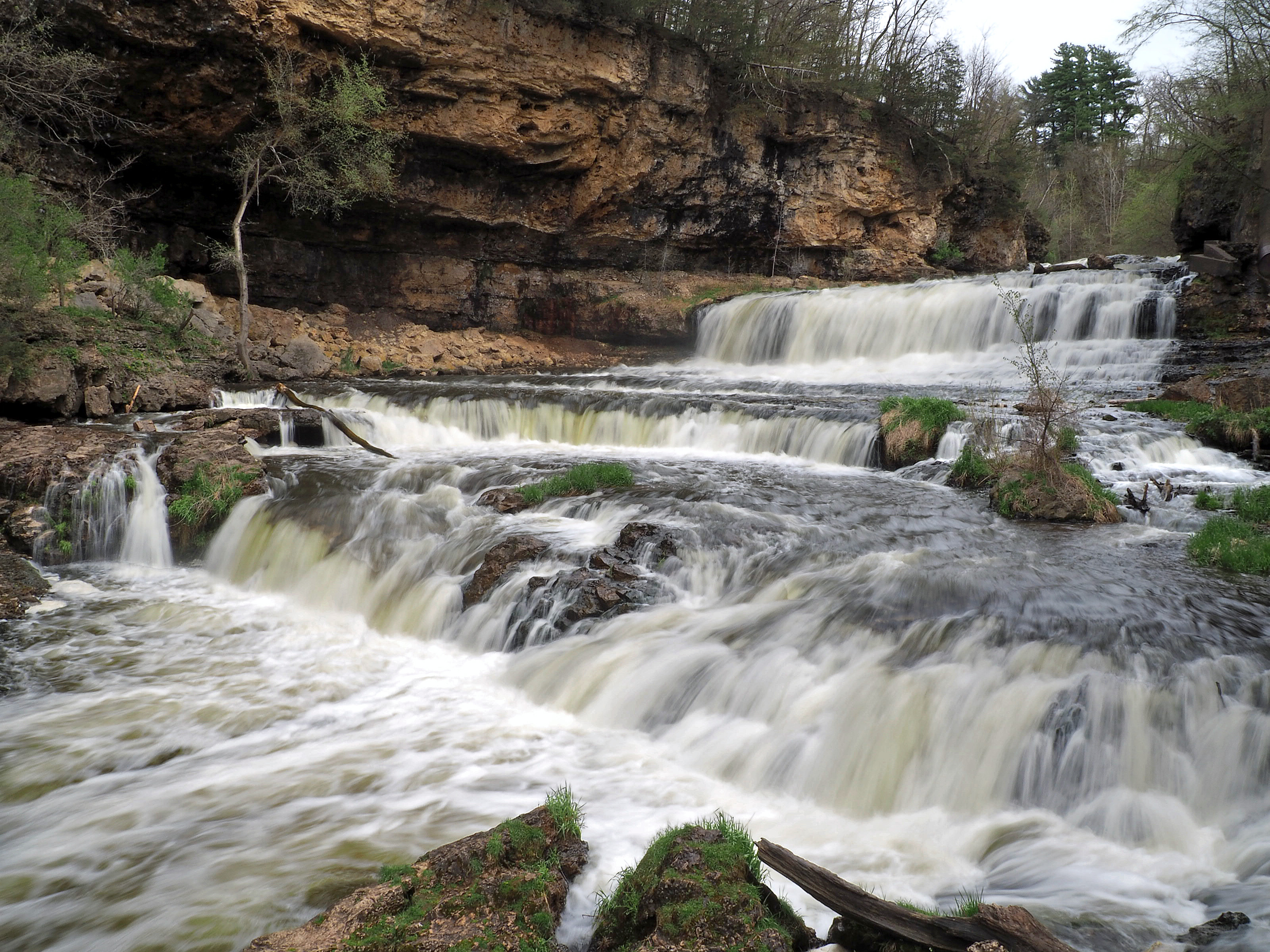
Willow Falls in Willow River State Park

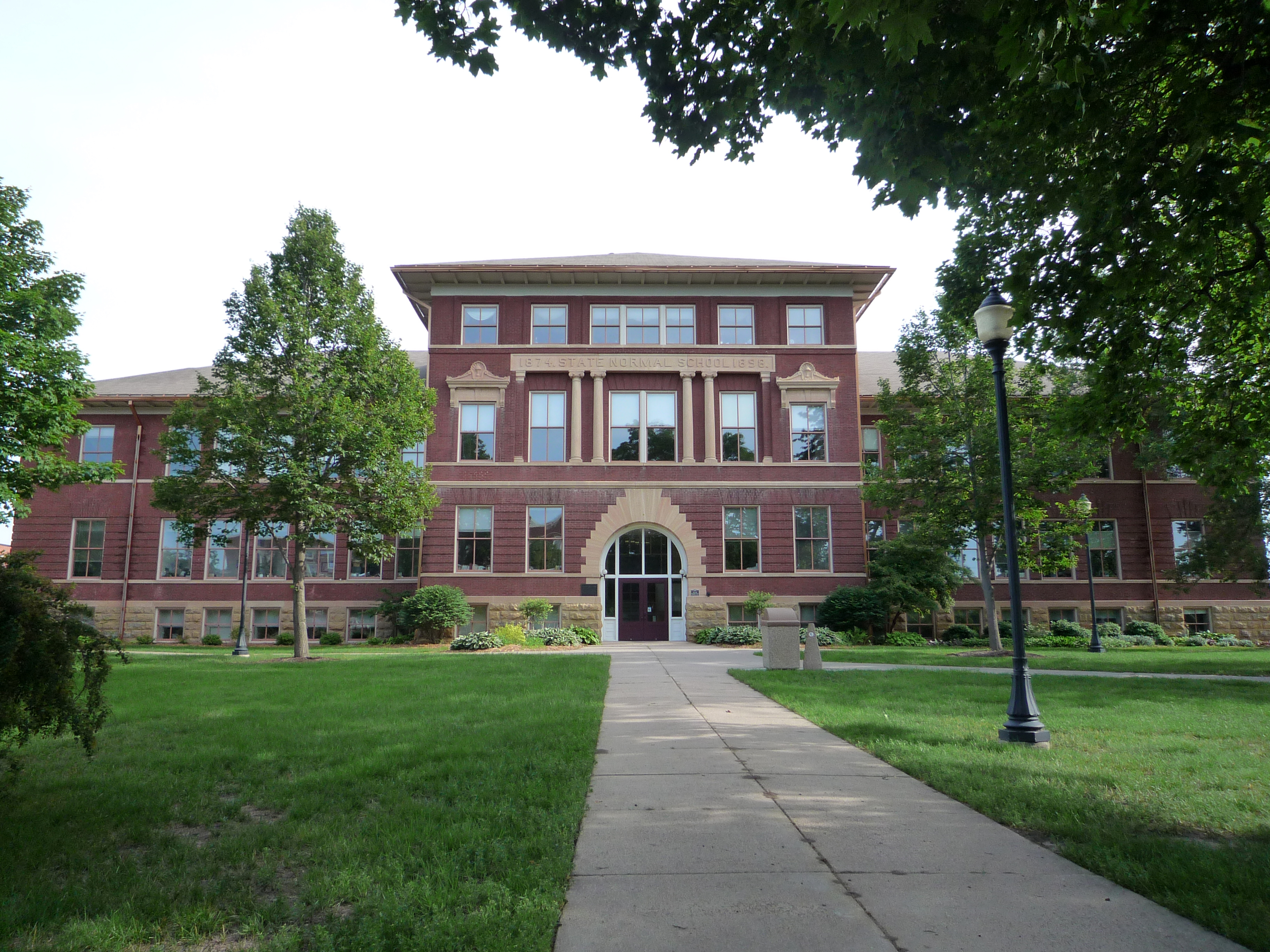
South Hall, on the University of Wisconsin–River Falls campus

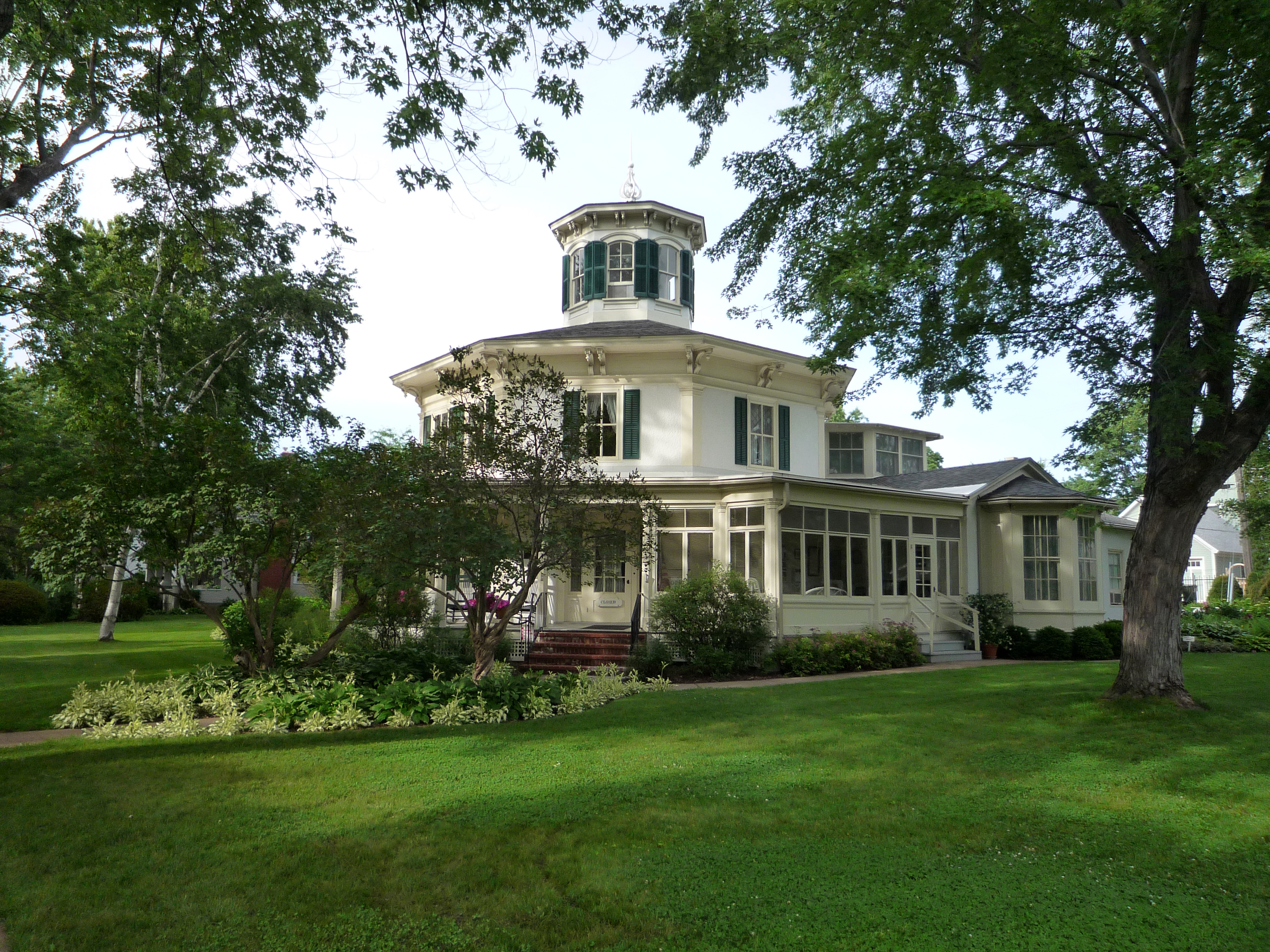
John S. Moffat House in Hudson

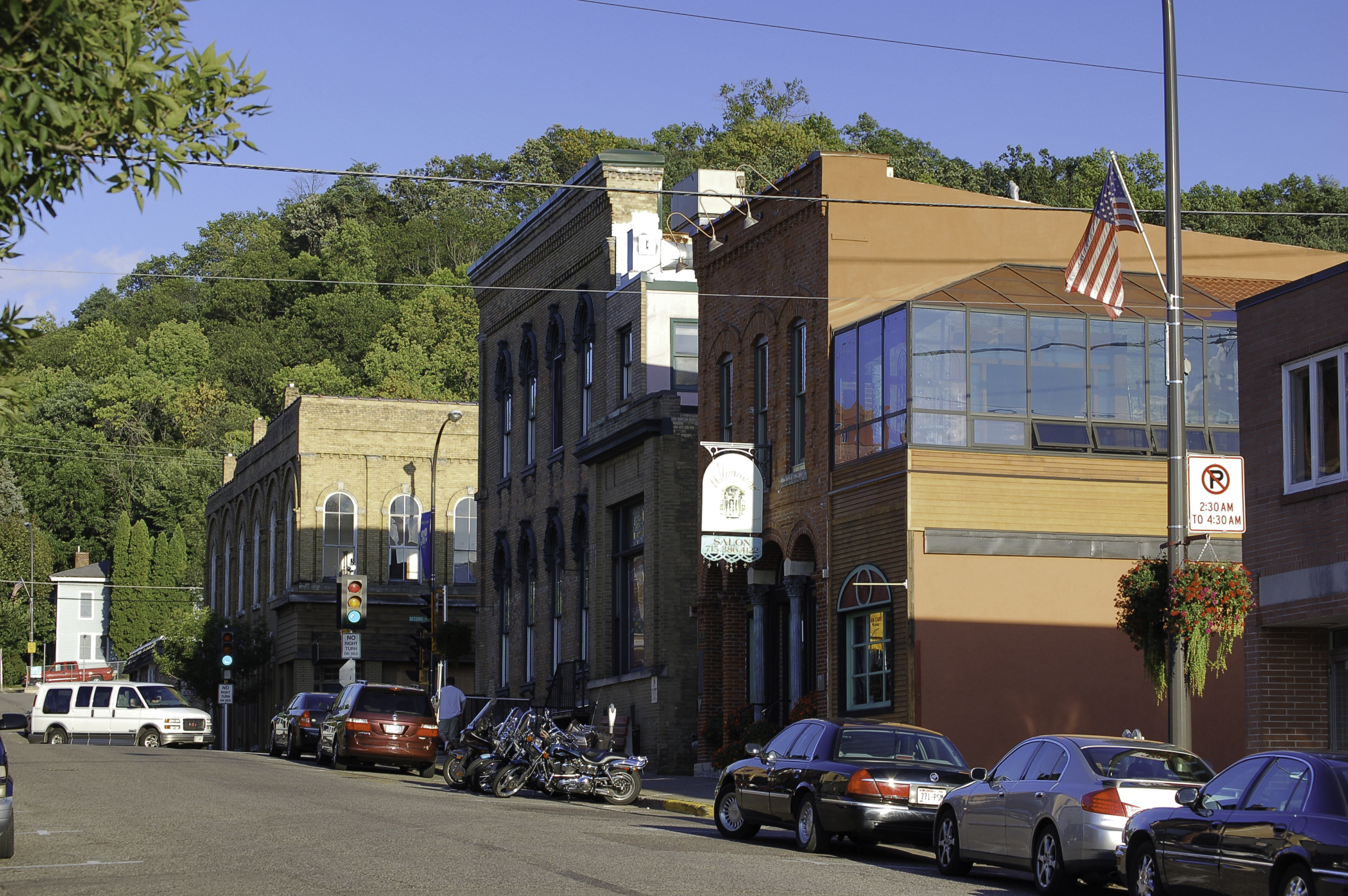
Downtown Hudson

== Past senators ==
Note: the boundaries of districts have changed repeatedly over history. Previous politicians of a specific numbered district have represented a completely different geographic area, due to redistricting.

The district has previously been represented by:

Senator	Party	Notes	Session	Years	District Definition
District created				1848	Dodge County
William M. Dennis	Dem.		1st	1848	Dodge County
William M. Dennis	Dem.		2nd	1849	Dodge County
James Giddings	Dem.		3rd	1850	Dodge County
James Giddings	Dem.		4th	1851	Dodge County
Judson Prentice	Whig	Redistricted to the 22nd district.	5th	1852	Dodge County
Marvin H. Bovee	Dem.		6th	1853	Southern Waukesha County: Town of Eagle; Town of Genesee; Town of Mukwonago; Town of Muskego; Town of New Berlin; Town of Ottawa; Town of Vernon; Town of Waukesha
James D. Reymert	Dem.		7th	1854	Southern Waukesha County: Town of Eagle; Town of Genesee; Town of Mukwonago; Town of Muskego; Town of New Berlin; Town of Ottawa; Town of Vernon; Town of Waukesha
James D. Reymert	Dem.		8th	1855	Southern Waukesha County: Town of Eagle; Town of Genesee; Town of Mukwonago; Town of Muskego; Town of New Berlin; Town of Ottawa; Town of Vernon; Town of Waukesha
Edward Gernon	Dem.		9th	1856	Southern Waukesha County: Town of Eagle; Town of Genesee; Town of Mukwonago; Town of Muskego; Town of New Berlin; Town of Ottawa; Town of Vernon; Town of Waukesha
Edward Gernon	Dem.		10th	1857	1856–1860 1861–1865 1866–1870 1871–1875 1876–1881 1882–1887; Waukesha County
Denison Worthington	Rep.		11th	1858	1856–1860 1861–1865 1866–1870 1871–1875 1876–1881 1882–1887; Waukesha County
Denison Worthington	Rep.		12th	1859	1856–1860 1861–1865 1866–1870 1871–1875 1876–1881 1882–1887; Waukesha County
Denison Worthington	Rep.		13th	1860	1856–1860 1861–1865 1866–1870 1871–1875 1876–1881 1882–1887; Waukesha County
Denison Worthington	Rep.		14th	1861	1856–1860 1861–1865 1866–1870 1871–1875 1876–1881 1882–1887; Waukesha County
George C. Pratt	Dem.		15th	1862	1856–1860 1861–1865 1866–1870 1871–1875 1876–1881 1882–1887; Waukesha County
George C. Pratt	Dem.		16th	1863	1856–1860 1861–1865 1866–1870 1871–1875 1876–1881 1882–1887; Waukesha County
William Blair	Natl. Union		17th	1864	1856–1860 1861–1865 1866–1870 1871–1875 1876–1881 1882–1887; Waukesha County
William Blair	Natl. Union		18th	1865	1856–1860 1861–1865 1866–1870 1871–1875 1876–1881 1882–1887; Waukesha County
Orson Reed	Dem.		19th	1866	1856–1860 1861–1865 1866–1870 1871–1875 1876–1881 1882–1887; Waukesha County
Orson Reed	Dem.		20th	1867	1856–1860 1861–1865 1866–1870 1871–1875 1876–1881 1882–1887; Waukesha County
Curtis Mann	Dem.		21st	1868	1856–1860 1861–1865 1866–1870 1871–1875 1876–1881 1882–1887; Waukesha County
Curtis Mann	Dem.		22nd	1869	1856–1860 1861–1865 1866–1870 1871–1875 1876–1881 1882–1887; Waukesha County
John A. Rice	Dem.		23rd	1870	1856–1860 1861–1865 1866–1870 1871–1875 1876–1881 1882–1887; Waukesha County
John A. Rice	Dem.		24th	1871	1856–1860 1861–1865 1866–1870 1871–1875 1876–1881 1882–1887; Waukesha County
William Blair	Rep.		25th	1872	1856–1860 1861–1865 1866–1870 1871–1875 1876–1881 1882–1887; Waukesha County
William Blair	Rep.		26th	1873	1856–1860 1861–1865 1866–1870 1871–1875 1876–1881 1882–1887; Waukesha County
John A. Rice	Dem.		27th	1874	1856–1860 1861–1865 1866–1870 1871–1875 1876–1881 1882–1887; Waukesha County
John A. Rice	Dem.		28th	1875	1856–1860 1861–1865 1866–1870 1871–1875 1876–1881 1882–1887; Waukesha County
William Blair	Rep.		29th	1876	1856–1860 1861–1865 1866–1870 1871–1875 1876–1881 1882–1887; Waukesha County
William Blair	Rep.		30th	1877	1856–1860 1861–1865 1866–1870 1871–1875 1876–1881 1882–1887; Waukesha County
John A. Rice	Dem.		31st	1878	1856–1860 1861–1865 1866–1870 1871–1875 1876–1881 1882–1887; Waukesha County
John A. Rice	Dem.		32nd	1879	1856–1860 1861–1865 1866–1870 1871–1875 1876–1881 1882–1887; Waukesha County
Richard Weaver	Dem.		33rd	1880	1856–1860 1861–1865 1866–1870 1871–1875 1876–1881 1882–1887; Waukesha County
Richard Weaver	Dem.		34th	1881	1856–1860 1861–1865 1866–1870 1871–1875 1876–1881 1882–1887; Waukesha County
Henry M. Ackley	Dem.		35th	1882	1856–1860 1861–1865 1866–1870 1871–1875 1876–1881 1882–1887; Waukesha County
Henry M. Ackley	Dem.		36th	1883–1884	1856–1860 1861–1865 1866–1870 1871–1875 1876–1881 1882–1887; Waukesha County
John Lins	Rep.		37th	1885–1886	1856–1860 1861–1865 1866–1870 1871–1875 1876–1881 1882–1887; Waukesha County
John Lins	Rep.		38th	1887–1888	1856–1860 1861–1865 1866–1870 1871–1875 1876–1881 1882–1887; Waukesha County
Horace A. Taylor	Rep.	Resigned in 1889 to become U.S. Assistant Secretary of the Treasury.	39th	1889–1890	Pierce, St. Croix counties
Vacant			39th	1889–1890	Pierce, St. Croix counties
William H. Phipps	Rep.	Resigned 1894.	40th	1891–1892	Pierce, St. Croix counties
William H. Phipps	Rep.	Resigned 1894.	41st	1893–1894	Pierce, Polk, St. Croix counties
Dempster Woodworth	Rep.	Won 1894 special election.	42nd	1895–1896	Pierce, Polk, St. Croix counties
Dempster Woodworth	Rep.	Won 1894 special election.	43rd	1897–1898	1896–1901 1902–1911; Pierce, St. Croix counties
Dempster Woodworth	Rep.	Won 1894 special election.	44th	1899–1900	1896–1901 1902–1911; Pierce, St. Croix counties
Orville W. Mosher	Rep.		45th	1901–1902	1896–1901 1902–1911; Pierce, St. Croix counties
Orville W. Mosher	Rep.		46th	1903–1904	1896–1901 1902–1911; Pierce, St. Croix counties
James A. Frear	Rep.	Resigned after being elected Wisconsin Secretary of State in 1906.	47th	1905–1906	1896–1901 1902–1911; Pierce, St. Croix counties
Walter C. Owen	Rep.	Won 1906 special election. Elected Attorney General of Wisconsin in 1912.	48th	1907–1908	1896–1901 1902–1911; Pierce, St. Croix counties
Walter C. Owen	Rep.	Won 1906 special election. Elected Attorney General of Wisconsin in 1912.	49th	1909–1910	1896–1901 1902–1911; Pierce, St. Croix counties
Walter C. Owen	Rep.	Won 1906 special election. Elected Attorney General of Wisconsin in 1912.	50th	1911–1912	1896–1901 1902–1911; Pierce, St. Croix counties
George B. Skogmo	Rep.		51st	1913–1914	Buffalo, Pepin, Pierce, St. Croix counties
George B. Skogmo	Rep.		52nd	1915–1916	Buffalo, Pepin, Pierce, St. Croix counties
George B. Skogmo	Rep.		53rd	1917–1918	Buffalo, Pepin, Pierce, St. Croix counties
George B. Skogmo	Rep.		54th	1919–1920	Buffalo, Pepin, Pierce, St. Croix counties
George B. Skogmo	Rep.		55th	1921–1922	Buffalo, Pepin, Pierce, St. Croix counties
George B. Skogmo	Rep.		56th	1923–1924	Buffalo, Pepin, Pierce, St. Croix counties
Walter H. Hunt	Rep.		57th	1925–1926	Buffalo, Pepin, Pierce, St. Croix counties
Walter H. Hunt	Rep.		58th	1927–1928	Buffalo, Pepin, Pierce, St. Croix counties
Walter H. Hunt	Rep.		59th	1929–1930	Buffalo, Pepin, Pierce, St. Croix counties
Walter H. Hunt	Rep.		60th	1931–1932	Buffalo, Pepin, Pierce, St. Croix counties
Walter H. Hunt	Rep.		61st	1933–1934	Buffalo, Pepin, Pierce, St. Croix counties
Walter H. Hunt	Prog.		62nd	1935–1936	Buffalo, Pepin, Pierce, St. Croix counties
Kenneth S. White	Rep.		63rd	1937–1938	Buffalo, Pepin, Pierce, St. Croix counties
Kenneth S. White	Rep.		64th	1939–1940	Buffalo, Pepin, Pierce, St. Croix counties
Warren P. Knowles	Rep.	Resigned after being elected Lieutenant Governor of Wisconsin in 1954.	65th	1941–1942	Buffalo, Pepin, Pierce, St. Croix counties
Warren P. Knowles	Rep.	Resigned after being elected Lieutenant Governor of Wisconsin in 1954.	66th	1943–1944	Buffalo, Pepin, Pierce, St. Croix counties
Warren P. Knowles	Rep.	Resigned after being elected Lieutenant Governor of Wisconsin in 1954.	67th	1945–1946	Buffalo, Pepin, Pierce, St. Croix counties
Warren P. Knowles	Rep.	Resigned after being elected Lieutenant Governor of Wisconsin in 1954.	68th	1947–1948	Buffalo, Pepin, Pierce, St. Croix counties
Warren P. Knowles	Rep.	Resigned after being elected Lieutenant Governor of Wisconsin in 1954.	69th	1949–1950	Buffalo, Pepin, Pierce, St. Croix counties
Warren P. Knowles	Rep.	Resigned after being elected Lieutenant Governor of Wisconsin in 1954.	70th	1951–1952	Buffalo, Pepin, Pierce, St. Croix counties
Warren P. Knowles	Rep.	Resigned after being elected Lieutenant Governor of Wisconsin in 1954.	71st	1953–1954	Buffalo, Pepin, Pierce, St. Croix counties
Vacant			72nd	1955–1956	Buffalo, Dunn, Pepin, Pierce, St. Croix counties
Robert P. Knowles	Rep.	Won 1955 special election.	72nd	1955–1956	Buffalo, Dunn, Pepin, Pierce, St. Croix counties
Robert P. Knowles	Rep.	Won 1955 special election.	73rd	1957–1958	Buffalo, Dunn, Pepin, Pierce, St. Croix counties
Robert P. Knowles	Rep.	Won 1955 special election.	74th	1959–1960	Buffalo, Dunn, Pepin, Pierce, St. Croix counties
Robert P. Knowles	Rep.	Won 1955 special election.	75th	1961–1962	Buffalo, Dunn, Pepin, Pierce, St. Croix counties
Robert P. Knowles	Rep.	Won 1955 special election.	76th	1963–1964	Buffalo, Dunn, Pepin, Pierce, St. Croix counties
Robert P. Knowles	Rep.	Won 1955 special election.	77th	1965–1966	Buffalo, Burnett, Pepin, Pierce, Polk, St. Croix counties
Robert P. Knowles	Rep.	Won 1955 special election.	78th	1967–1968	Buffalo, Burnett, Pepin, Pierce, Polk, St. Croix counties
Robert P. Knowles	Rep.	Won 1955 special election.	79th	1969–1970	Buffalo, Burnett, Pepin, Pierce, Polk, St. Croix counties
Robert P. Knowles	Rep.	Won 1955 special election.	80th	1971–1972	Buffalo, Burnett, Pepin, Pierce, Polk, St. Croix counties
Robert P. Knowles	Rep.	Won 1955 special election.	81st	1973–1974	Buffalo, Burnett, Pepin, Pierce, Polk, St. Croix counties and western Barron County and part of Trempealeau County: Barron County; Town of Almena; Town of Arland; Town of Clinton; Town of Crystal Lake; Town of Cumberland; Town of Lakeland; Town of Maple Plain; Town of Prairie Farm; Town of Turtle Lake; Town of Vance Creek; Village of Almena; Village of Prairie Farm; Village of Turtle Lake; City of Cumberland; Trempealeau County; Town of Arcadia; Town of Burnside; Town of Dodge; City of Arcadia; City of Independence
Robert P. Knowles	Rep.	Won 1955 special election.	82nd	1975–1976	
Michele Radosevich	Dem.		83rd	1977–1978	
Michele Radosevich	Dem.		84th	1979–1980	
James Harsdorf	Rep.		85th	1981–1982	
James Harsdorf	Rep.		86th	1983–1984	Burnett, Pierce, Polk, St. Croix counties and western Dunn County: Town of Eau Galle; Town of Hay River; Town of Lucas; Town of Menomonie; Town of New Haven; Town of Otter Creek; Town of Sheridan; Town of Sherman; Town of Stanton; Town of Tiffany; Town of Weston; Town of Wilson; Village of Boyceville; Village of Downing; Village of Knapp; Village of Ridgeland; Village of Wheeler; City of Menomonie
James Harsdorf	Rep.		87th	1985–1986	Burnett, Pierce, Polk, St. Croix counties and western Dunn County: Town of Eau Galle; Town of Hay River; Town of Lucas; Town of Menomonie; Town of New Haven; Town of Sheridan; Town of Stanton; Town of Tiffany; Town of Weston; Town of Wilson; Village of Boyceville; Village of Downing; Village of Knapp; Village of Ridgeland; Village of Wheeler; City of Menomonie
James Harsdorf	Rep.		88th	1987–1988	Burnett, Pierce, Polk, St. Croix counties and western Dunn County: Town of Eau Galle; Town of Hay River; Town of Lucas; Town of Menomonie; Town of New Haven; Town of Sheridan; Town of Stanton; Town of Tiffany; Town of Weston; Town of Wilson; Village of Boyceville; Village of Downing; Village of Knapp; Village of Ridgeland; Village of Wheeler; City of Menomonie
Richard Shoemaker	Dem.	Resigned Oct. 1989.	89th	1989–1990	Burnett, Pierce, Polk, St. Croix counties and western Dunn County: Town of Eau Galle; Town of Hay River; Town of Lucas; Town of Menomonie; Town of New Haven; Town of Sheridan; Town of Stanton; Town of Tiffany; Town of Weston; Town of Wilson; Village of Boyceville; Village of Downing; Village of Knapp; Village of Ridgeland; Village of Wheeler; City of Menomonie
Vacant			89th	1989–1990	Burnett, Pierce, Polk, St. Croix counties and western Dunn County: Town of Eau Galle; Town of Hay River; Town of Lucas; Town of Menomonie; Town of New Haven; Town of Sheridan; Town of Stanton; Town of Tiffany; Town of Weston; Town of Wilson; Village of Boyceville; Village of Downing; Village of Knapp; Village of Ridgeland; Village of Wheeler; City of Menomonie
William Berndt	Rep.	Won 1989 special election.	90th	1991–1992	Burnett, Pierce, Polk, St. Croix counties and western Dunn County: Town of Eau Galle; Town of Hay River; Town of Lucas; Town of Menomonie; Town of New Haven; Town of Sheridan; Town of Stanton; Town of Tiffany; Town of Weston; Town of Wilson; Village of Boyceville; Village of Downing; Village of Knapp; Village of Ridgeland; Village of Wheeler; City of Menomonie
Alice Clausing	Dem.		91st	1993–1994	Burnett, Pierce, St. Croix counties and most of Polk County and part of Dunn County: Polk County; Town of Alden; Town of Apple River; Town of Balsam Lake; Town of Black Brook; Town of Bone Lake; Town of Clam Falls; Town of Clayton; Town of Clear Lake; Town of Eureka; Town of Farmington; Town of Garfield; Town of Georgetown; Town of Laketown; Town of Lincoln; Town of Lorain; Town of Luck; Town of Milltown; Town of Osceola; Town of St. Croix Falls; Town of Sterling; Town of West Sweden; Village of Balsam Lake; Village of Centuria; Village of Clayton; Village of Clear Lake; Village of Dresser; Village of Frederic; Village of Luck; Village of Milltown; Village of Osceola; City of Amery; City of St. Croix Falls; Dunn County; Town of Lucas; Town of Menomonie; Town of New Haven; Town of Sheridan; Town of Stanton; Village of Knapp; City of Menomonie
Alice Clausing	Dem.		92nd	1995–1996	
Alice Clausing	Dem.		93rd	1997–1998	
Alice Clausing	Dem.		94th	1999–2000	
Sheila Harsdorf	Rep.	Resigned Nov. 2017 after to become Secretary of Wisconsin Department of Agriculture, Trade and Consumer Protection.	95th	2001–2002	
Sheila Harsdorf	Rep.	Resigned Nov. 2017 after to become Secretary of Wisconsin Department of Agriculture, Trade and Consumer Protection.	96th	2003–2004	St. Croix County and most of Burnett County, part of Dunn County, part of Pierce County, and most of Polk County: Burnett County; Town of Anderson; Town of Daniels; Town of Dewey; Town of Grantsburg; Town of La Follette; Town of Lincoln; Town of Meenon; Town of Roosevelt; Town of Siren; Town of Trade Lake; Town of West Marshland; Town of Wood River; Village of Grantsburg; Village of Siren; Village of Webster; Dunn County; Town of Lucas; Town of Menomonie; Town of Stanton; Village of Knapp; City of Menomonie; Pierce County; Town of Clifton; Town of Diamond Bluff; Town of Gilman; Town of Oak Grove; Town of River Falls; Town of Spring Lake; Town of Trenton; Town of Trimbelle; Village of Ellsworth; Village of Elmwood; Village of Spring Valley; City of Prescott; City of River Falls; Polk County; Town of Alden; Town of Apple River; Town of Balsam Lake; Town of Black Brook; Town of Bone Lake; Town of Clam Falls; Town of Clayton; Town of Clear Lake; Town of Eureka; Town of Farmington; Town of Garfield; Town of Georgetown; Town of Laketown; Town of Lincoln; Town of Lorain; Town of Luck; Town of Milltown; Town of Osceola; Town of St. Croix Falls; Town of Sterling; Town of West Sweden; Village of Balsam Lake; Village of Centuria; Village of Clayton; Village of Clear Lake; Village of Dresser; Village of Frederic; Village of Luck; Village of Milltown; Village of Osceola; City of Amery; City of St. Croix Falls
Sheila Harsdorf	Rep.	Resigned Nov. 2017 after to become Secretary of Wisconsin Department of Agriculture, Trade and Consumer Protection.	97th	2005–2006	
Sheila Harsdorf	Rep.	Resigned Nov. 2017 after to become Secretary of Wisconsin Department of Agriculture, Trade and Consumer Protection.	98th	2007–2008	
Sheila Harsdorf	Rep.	Resigned Nov. 2017 after to become Secretary of Wisconsin Department of Agriculture, Trade and Consumer Protection.	99th	2009–2010	
Sheila Harsdorf	Rep.	Resigned Nov. 2017 after to become Secretary of Wisconsin Department of Agriculture, Trade and Consumer Protection.	100th	2011–2012	
Sheila Harsdorf	Rep.	Resigned Nov. 2017 after to become Secretary of Wisconsin Department of Agriculture, Trade and Consumer Protection.	101st	2013–2014	Western Burnett County, part Dunn County, part of Pierce County, most of Polk County, and most of St. Croix County: Burnett County; Town of Anderson; Town of Daniels; Town of Grantsburg; Town of Lincoln; Town of Meenon; Town of Siren; Town of Trade Lake; Town of West Marshland; Town of Wood River; Village of Grantsburg; Village of Siren; Village of Webster; Dunn County; Town of Lucas; Town of Menomonie; Town of Stanton; Town of Tiffany; Village of Boyceville; Village of Downing; Village of Knapp; City of Menomonie; Pierce County; Town of River Falls; City of River Falls; Polk County; Town of Alden; Town of Apple River; Town of Balsam Lake; Town of Beaver; Town of Black Brook; Town of Bone Lake; Town of Clam Falls; Town of Clayton; Town of Eureka; Town of Farmington; Town of Garfield; Town of Georgetown; Town of Laketown; Town of Lincoln; Town of Lorain; Town of Luck; Town of Milltown; Town of Osceola; Town of St. Croix Falls; Town of Sterling; Town of West Sweden; Village of Balsam Lake; Village of Centuria; Village of Clayton; Village of Dresser; Village of Frederic; Village of Luck; Village of Milltown; Village of Osceola; City of Amery; City of St. Croix Falls; St. Croix County; Town of Baldwin; Town of Cady; Town of Cylon; Town of Eau Galle; Town of Emerald; Town of Erin Prairie; Town of Glenwood; Town of Hammond; Town of Hudson; Town of Kinnickinnic; Town of Pleasant Valley; Town of Richmond; Town of Rush River; Town of Somerset; Town of Springfield; Town of St. Joseph; Town of Stanton; Town of Star Prairie; Town of Troy; Town of Warren; Village of Baldwin; Village of Deer Park; Village of Hammond; Village of North Hudson; Village of Roberts; Village of Somerset; Village of Star Prairie; Village of Wilson; Village of Woodville; City of Glenwood City; City of Hudson; City of New Richmond
Sheila Harsdorf	Rep.	Resigned Nov. 2017 after to become Secretary of Wisconsin Department of Agriculture, Trade and Consumer Protection.	102nd	2015–2016	
Sheila Harsdorf	Rep.	Resigned Nov. 2017 after to become Secretary of Wisconsin Department of Agriculture, Trade and Consumer Protection.	103rd	2017–2018	
Vacant			103rd	2017–2018	
Patty Schachtner	Dem.	Won 2018 special election.	103rd	2017–2018	
Patty Schachtner	Dem.	Won 2018 special election.	104th	2019–2020	
Rob Stafsholt	Rep.	Elected 2020. Re-elected 2024.	105th	2021–2022	
Rob Stafsholt	Rep.	Elected 2020. Re-elected 2024.	106th	2023–2024	Polk and St. Croix counties, most of Dunn County, part of Pierce County
Rob Stafsholt	Rep.	Elected 2020. Re-elected 2024.	107th	2025–2026	
