= Alonzo L. Best =

American politician

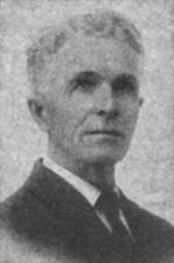

Member of the Wisconsin State Assembly
- In office 1919–1922

Personal details
- Born: October 6, 1854 Big Spring, Wisconsin, US
- Died: June 24, 1923 (aged 68) Downing, Wisconsin, US
- Party: Republican
- Spouse: Cora May Brewer (m. 1874)
- Children: 5
- Occupation: Farmer, politician

Alonzo L. Best (October 6, 1854 – June 24, 1923) was an American politician and farmer.

== Biography ==
Born in Big Spring, Adams County, Wisconsin, Best moved with his family to Dunn County, Wisconsin. Best owned the Meadow Side Stock Farm near Downing, Wisconsin, in the town of Tiffany and raised cattle and hogs. He also taught school. Best served as Tiffany town clerk and Tiffany town chairman. He also served on the Dunn County Board of Supervisors and as secretary on the school board. Best served in the Wisconsin State Assembly and was a Republican.

He married Cora May Brewer on July 15, 1874, and they had five children.

Best died from pneumonia at his home in Downing on June 24, 1923.
