= West Sweden, Wisconsin =

Town of West Sweden
- Town
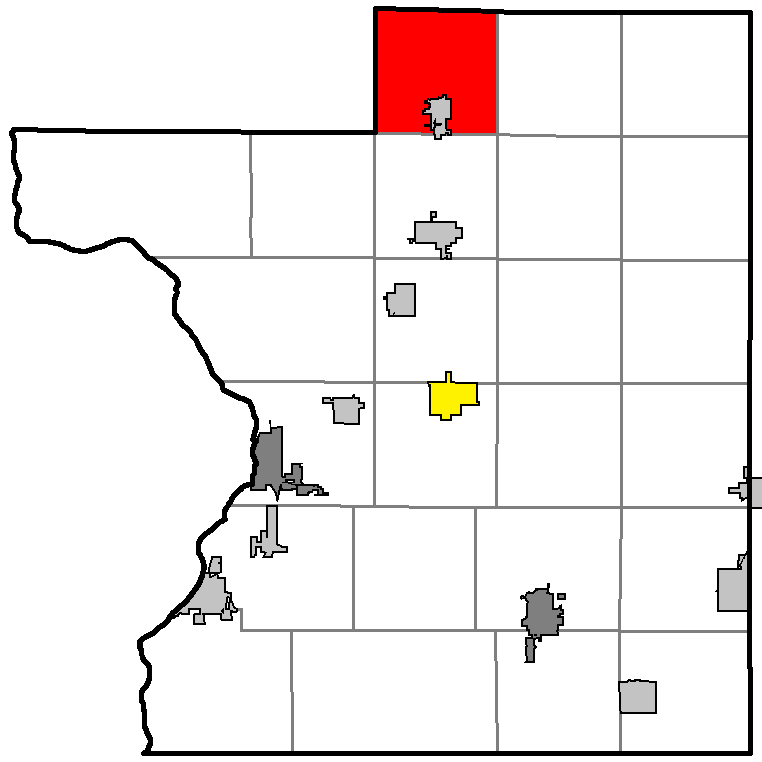
- Location of West Sweden, within Polk County

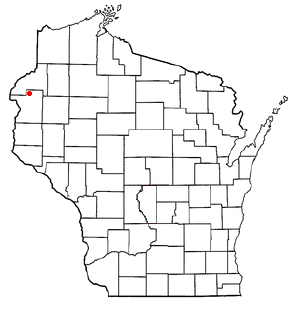
- Location of the Town of West Sweden
- Coordinates: 45°41′38″N 92°28′2″W
- Country: United States
- State: Wisconsin
- County: Polk

Area
  - Total: 33.7 sq mi (87.2 km^{2})
  - Land: 32.7 sq mi (84.6 km^{2})
  - Water: 1.0 sq mi (2.7 km^{2})
- Elevation: 1,076 ft (328 m)

Population (2020)
  - Total: 744
  - Density: 22.8/sq mi (8.79/km^{2})
- Time zone: UTC-6 (Central (CST))
  - Summer (DST): UTC-5 (CDT)
- Area codes: 715 & 534
- FIPS code: 55-86350
- GNIS feature ID: 1584417
- Website: http://townofwestsweden.com/

The Town of West Sweden is located in Polk County, Wisconsin, United States. The population was 744 at the 2020 census. The unincorporated community of Pole Cat Crossing is partly in the town.

== Geography ==
According to the United States Census Bureau, the town has a total area of 33.7 square miles (87.3 km^{2}), of which, 32.7 square miles (84.6 km^{2}) of it is land and 1.0 square miles (2.7 km^{2}) of it (3.09%) is water.

== History ==
The first settlers immigrated in the 1860s. Some of the earliest were the Chell, Friberg, and Lundquist families. Grace Lutheran Church was built in 1873. The town was officially formed in November 1875 and named West Sweden because the settlers in this new community were now living “west” of their original homeland of Sweden.

== Demographics ==
As of the census of 2000, there were 731 people, 285 households, and 214 families residing in the town. The population density was 22.4 people per square mile (8.6/km^{2}). There were 327 housing units at an average density of 10.0 per square mile (3.9/km^{2}). The racial makeup of the town was 96.58% White, 0.27% African American, 2.05% Native American, 0.27% Asian, 0.14% Pacific Islander, 0.41% from other races, and 0.27% from two or more races. Hispanic or Latino of any race were 0.14% of the population.

There were 285 households, out of which 33.3% had children under the age of 18 living with them, 63.9% were married couples living together, 7.4% had a female householder with no husband present, and 24.9% were non-families. 21.4% of all households were made up of individuals, and 7.7% had someone living alone who was 65 years of age or older. The average household size was 2.56 and the average family size was 3.01.

In the town, the population was spread out, with 26.1% under the age of 18, 6.0% from 18 to 24, 25.7% from 25 to 44, 26.3% from 45 to 64, and 15.9% who were 65 years of age or older. The median age was 41 years. For every 100 females, there were 101.9 males. For every 100 females age 18 and over, there were 103.0 males.

The median income for a household in the town was $41,250, and the median income for a family was $49,583. Males had a median income of $34,464 versus $23,750 for females. The per capita income for the town was $18,777. About 3.5% of families and 5.1% of the population were below the poverty line, including 3.0% of those under age 18 and 9.8% of those age 65 or over.
