= Trade Lake, Wisconsin =

- Town
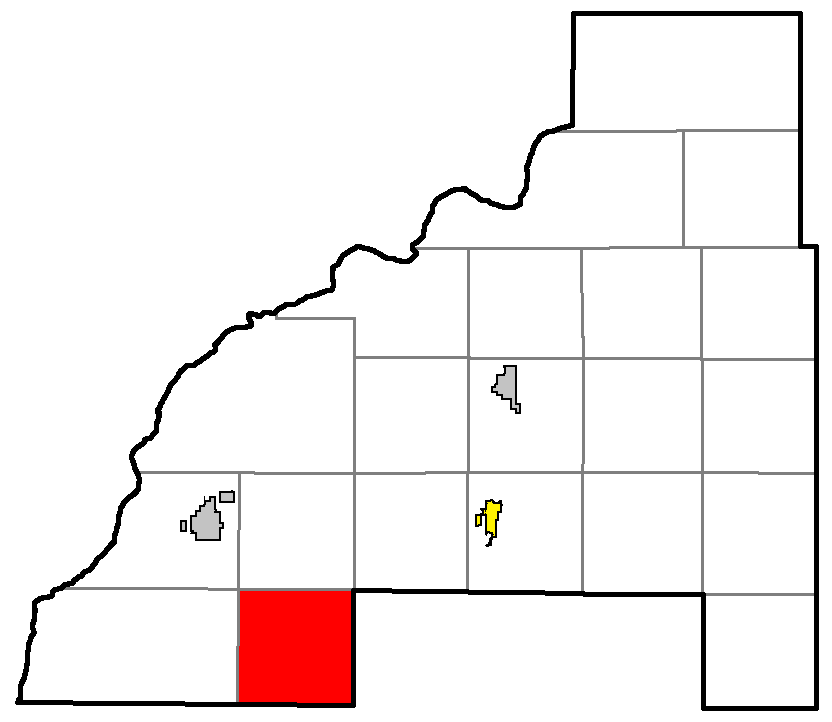
- Location of Trade Lake, within Burnett County
- Coordinates: 45°41′8″N 92°35′29″W
- Country: United States
- State: Wisconsin
- County: Burnett

Area
  - Total: 35.5 sq mi (91.9 km^{2})
  - Land: 32.5 sq mi (84.2 km^{2})
  - Water: 3.0 sq mi (7.7 km^{2})
- Elevation: 945 ft (288 m)

Population (2020)
  - Total: 904
  - Density: 27.8/sq mi (10.7/km^{2})
- Time zone: UTC-6 (Central (CST))
  - Summer (DST): UTC-5 (CDT)
- Area codes: 715 & 534
- FIPS code: 55-80375
- GNIS feature ID: 1584288
- Website: tradelakewi.org

Trade Lake is a town in Burnett County in the U.S. state of Wisconsin. The population was 904 in the 2020 census. The unincorporated communities of Four Corners and Trade Lake are located in the town. The unincorporated community of Pole Cat Crossing is also located partially in the town.

== Geography ==
The town of Trade Lake is located in southwestern Burnett County, with Polk County along the town's southern and eastern borders. The water bodies of Big Trade Lake and Little Trade Lake are near the center of the town, with the unincorporated community of Trade Lake located near the northeast corner of Little Trade Lake.

According to the United States Census Bureau, the town has a total area of 35.5 square miles (91.9 km^{2}), of which 32.5 square miles (84.2 km^{2}) is land and 3.0 square miles (7.7 km^{2}), or 8.41%, is water.

== Demographics ==
As of the census of 2000, there were 871 people, 366 households, and 260 families residing in the town. The population density was 26.8 people per square mile (10.3/km^{2}). There were 625 housing units at an average density of 19.2 per square mile (7.4/km^{2}). The racial makeup of the town was 98.28% White, 0.11% Asian, and 1.61% from two or more races. Hispanic or Latino of any race were 0.23% of the population.

There were 366 households, out of which 25.1% had children under the age of 18 living with them, 59.0% were married couples living together, 5.7% had a female householder with no husband present, and 28.7% were non-families. 26.2% of all households were made up of individuals, and 10.7% had someone living alone who was 65 years of age or older. The average household size was 2.36 and the average family size was 2.79.

In the town, the population was spread out, with 21.9% under the age of 18, 7.0% from 18 to 24, 21.9% from 25 to 44, 30.3% from 45 to 64, and 18.8% who were 65 years of age or older. The median age was 44 years. For every 100 females, there were 116.1 males. For every 100 females age 18 and over, there were 109.9 males.

The median income for a household in the town was $35,982, and the median income for a family was $45,625. Males had a median income of $34,688 versus $20,903 for females. The per capita income for the town was $19,863. About 5.6% of families and 8.5% of the population were below the poverty line, including 14.5% of those under age 18 and 6.7% of those age 65 or over.
