= Wilson, Dunn County, Wisconsin =

Wilson, Wisconsin
- Town
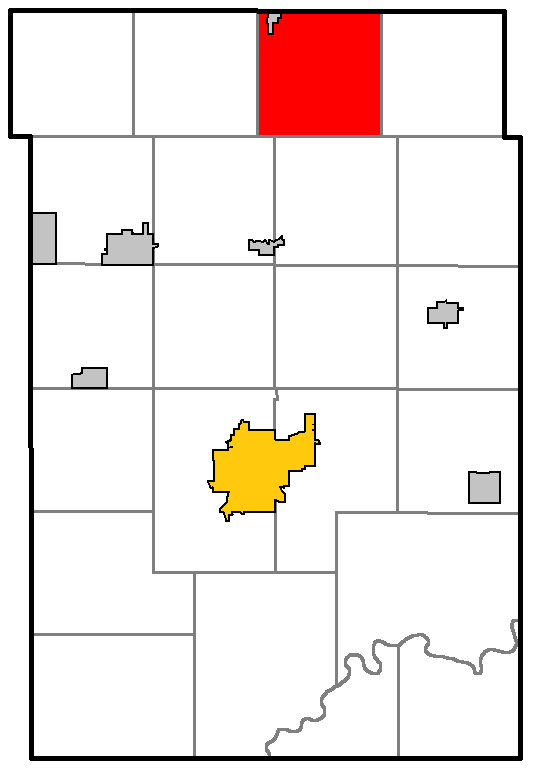
- Location of Wilson, within Dunn County

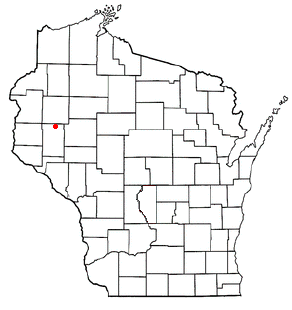
- Location of Wilson, Wisconsin
- Coordinates: 45°10′34″N 91°50′25″W
- Country: United States
- State: Wisconsin
- County: Dunn

Area
  - Total: 35.5 sq mi (92.0 km^{2})
  - Land: 35.5 sq mi (92.0 km^{2})
  - Water: 0 sq mi (0.0 km^{2})
- Elevation: 1,119 ft (341 m)

Population (2020)
  - Total: 504
  - Density: 14.2/sq mi (5.48/km^{2})
- Time zone: UTC-6 (Central (CST))
  - Summer (DST): UTC-5 (CDT)
- Area codes: 715 & 534
- FIPS code: 55-87375
- GNIS feature ID: 1584443
- Website: https://www.townofwilsondunncty.com/

Wilson is a town in Dunn County, Wisconsin, United States. The population was 504 at the 2020 census.

== Geography ==
According to the United States Census Bureau, the town has a total area of 35.5 square miles (92.0 km^{2}), all land.

== Demographics ==
Historical population
Census	Pop.	Note	%±
1990	490		—
2000	500		2.0%
2010	531		6.2%
2020	504		−5.1%

As of the census of 2000, there were 500 people, 192 households, and 144 families residing in the town. The population density was 14.1 people per square mile (5.4/km^{2}). There were 212 housing units at an average density of 6.0 per square mile (2.3/km^{2}). The racial makeup of the town was 98.00% White, 0.20% Asian, 0.40% from other races, and 1.40% from two or more races. Hispanic or Latino of any race were 0.60% of the population.

There were 192 households, out of which 29.7% had children under the age of 18 living with them, 67.7% were married couples living together, 3.6% had a female householder with no husband present, and 24.5% were non-families. 22.4% of all households were made up of individuals, and 7.8% had someone living alone who was 65 years of age or older. The average household size was 2.60 and the average family size was 3.06.

In the town, the population was spread out, with 24.6% under the age of 18, 8.2% from 18 to 24, 27.8% from 25 to 44, 25.4% from 45 to 64, and 14.0% who were 65 years of age or older. The median age was 40 years. For every 100 females, there were 109.2 males. For every 100 females age 18 and over, there were 116.7 males.

The median income for a household in the town was $33,750, and the median income for a family was $37,625. Males had a median income of $25,909 versus $19,808 for females. The per capita income for the town was $14,319. About 8.8% of families and 11.4% of the population were below the poverty line, including 16.0% of those under age 18 and 17.2% of those age 65 or over.
