= Sheridan, Wisconsin =

- Town
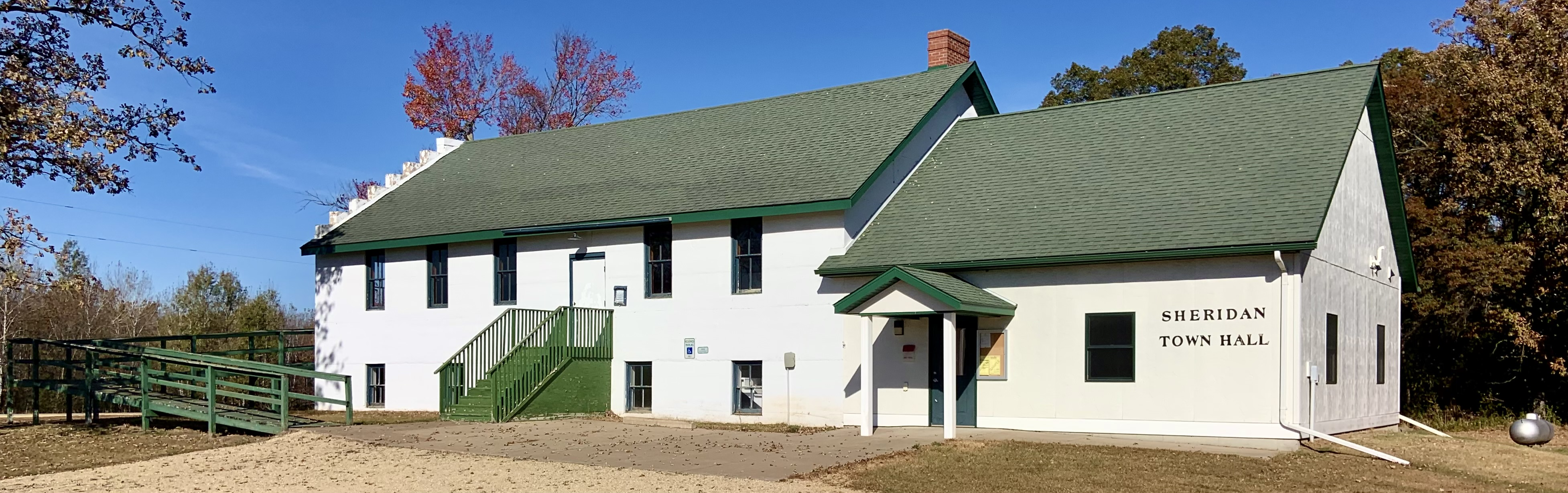
- Town hall

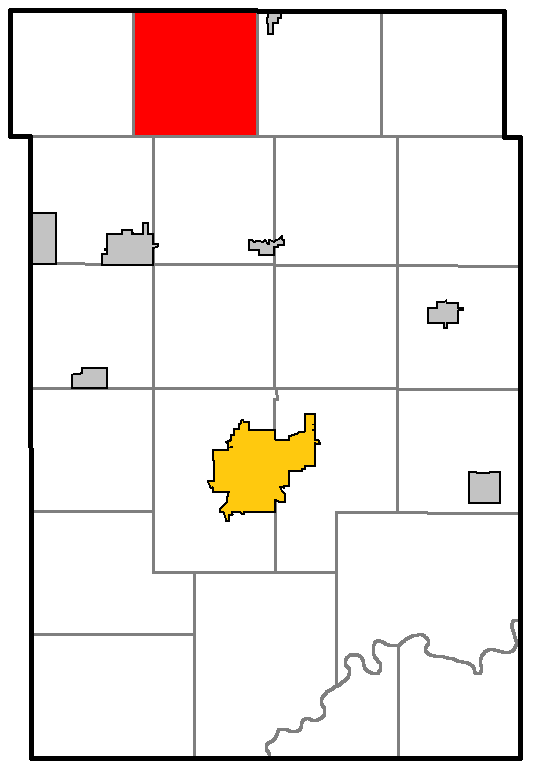
- Location of Sheridan, within Dunn County

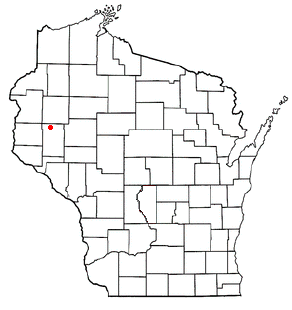
- Location of Sheridan, Wisconsin
- Coordinates: 45°9′43″N 91°58′24″W
- Country: United States
- State: Wisconsin
- County: Dunn

Area
  - Total: 36.1 sq mi (93.5 km^{2})
  - Land: 36.1 sq mi (93.5 km^{2})
  - Water: 0 sq mi (0.0 km^{2})
- Elevation: 981 ft (299 m)

Population (2020)
  - Total: 460
  - Density: 13/sq mi (4.9/km^{2})
- Time zone: UTC-6 (Central (CST))
  - Summer (DST): UTC-5 (CDT)
- Area codes: 715 & 534
- FIPS code: 55-73300
- GNIS feature ID: 1584144
- Website: https://sheridantownship.org/

Sheridan is a town in Dunn County, Wisconsin, United States. The population was 460 at the 2020 census.

== Geography ==
According to the United States Census Bureau, the town has a total area of 36.1 square miles (93.5 km^{2}), of which 36.1 square miles (93.5 km^{2}) is land and 0.03% is water.

== Demographics ==
Historical population
Census	Pop.	Note	%±
1990	468		—
2000	483		3.2%
2010	454		−6.0%
2020	460		1.3%

As of the census of 2000, there were 483 people, 168 households, and 130 families residing in the town. The population density was 13.4 people per square mile (5.2/km^{2}). There were 185 housing units at an average density of 5.1 per square mile (2.0/km^{2}). The racial makeup of the town was 98.34% White, 0.21% African American, 0.41% Native American, and 1.04% from two or more races. Hispanic or Latino of any race were 0.62% of the population.

There were 168 households, out of which 37.5% had children under the age of 18 living with them, 69.6% were married couples living together, 3.6% had a female householder with no husband present, and 22.6% were non-families. 16.7% of all households were made up of individuals, and 5.4% had someone living alone who was 65 years of age or older. The average household size was 2.88 and the average family size was 3.20.

In the town, the population was spread out, with 28.2% under the age of 18, 7.5% from 18 to 24, 26.9% from 25 to 44, 28.2% from 45 to 64, and 9.3% who were 65 years of age or older. The median age was 37 years. For every 100 females, there were 110.9 males. For every 100 females age 18 and over, there were 118.2 males.

The median income for a household in the town was $44,167, and the median income for a family was $49,375. Males had a median income of $30,139 versus $26,250 for females. The per capita income for the town was $16,550. About 6.7% of families and 7.5% of the population were below the poverty line, including 5.1% of those under age 18 and 9.8% of those age 65 or over.
