= Tiffany, Wisconsin =

- Town
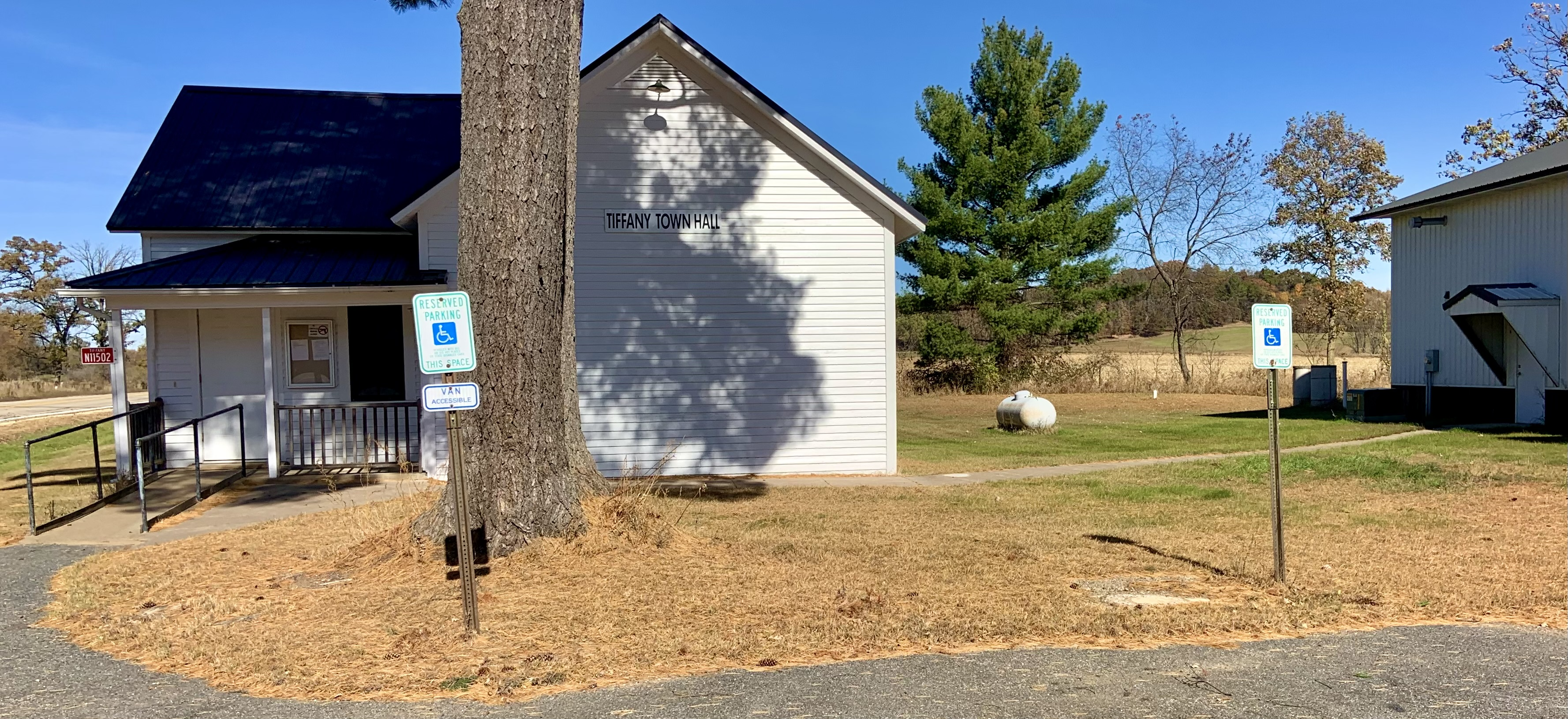
- Town hall

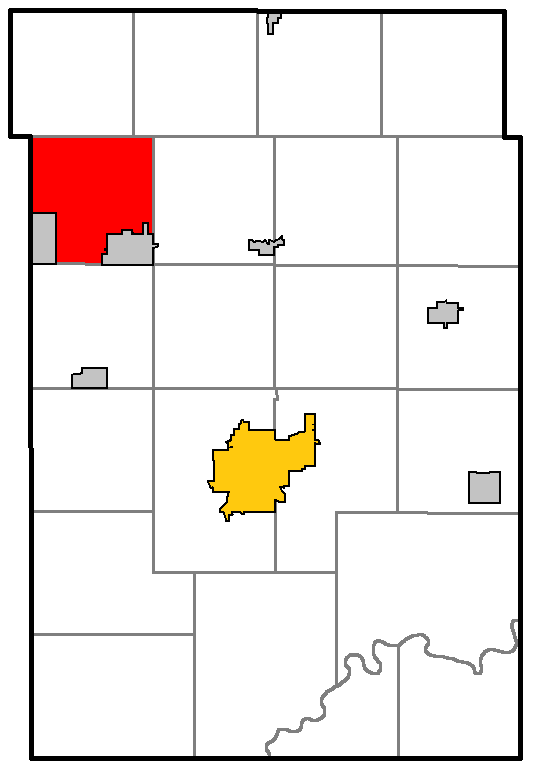
- Location of Tiffany, within Dunn County

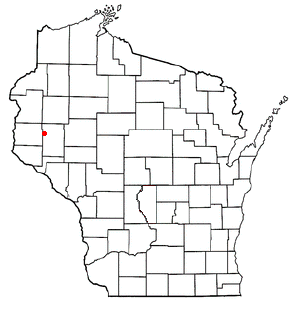
- Location of Tiffany, Wisconsin
- Coordinates: 45°4′55″N 92°4′30″W
- Country: United States
- State: Wisconsin
- County: Dunn

Area
  - Total: 30.0 sq mi (77.6 km^{2})
  - Land: 29.9 sq mi (77.5 km^{2})
  - Water: 0 sq mi (0.0 km^{2})
- Elevation: 1,079 ft (329 m)

Population (2020)
  - Total: 617
  - Density: 21/sq mi (8.2/km^{2})
- Time zone: UTC-6 (Central (CST))
  - Summer (DST): UTC-5 (CDT)
- Area codes: 715 & 534
- FIPS code: 55-79775
- GNIS feature ID: 1584278
- Website: https://www.tiffanywitownhall.com/

Tiffany is a town in Dunn County, Wisconsin, United States. The population was 617 at the time of the 2020 census. The villages of Boyceville and Downing are adjacent to the town.

== Demographics ==
Historical population
Census	Pop.	Note	%±
1990	594		—
2000	633		6.6%
2010	618		−2.4%
2020	617		−0.2%

As of the census of 2000, there were 633 people, 230 households, and 177 families residing in the town. The population density was 21.1 people per square mile (8.2/km^{2}). There were 239 housing units at an average density of 8.0 per square mile (3.1/km^{2}). The racial makeup of the town was 99.53% White, and 0.47% from two or more races. Hispanic or Latino of any race were 1.26% of the population.

There were 230 households, out of which 38.3% had children under the age of 18 living with them, 67.0% were married couples living together, 5.7% had a female householder with no husband present, and 23.0% were non-families. 16.5% of all households were made up of individuals, and 6.5% had someone living alone who was 65 years of age or older. The average household size was 2.75 and the average family size was 3.10.

In the town, the population was spread out, with 27.8% under the age of 18, 8.8% from 18 to 24, 26.5% from 25 to 44, 25.9% from 45 to 64, and 10.9% who were 65 years of age or older. The median age was 37 years. For every 100 females, there were 110.3 males. For every 100 females age 18 and over, there were 109.6 males.

The median income for a household in the town was $38,750, and the median income for a family was $42,750. Males had a median income of $31,500 versus $21,023 for females. The per capita income for the town was $18,203. About 12.9% of families and 10.4% of the population were below the poverty line, including 15.0% of those under age 18 and none of those age 65 or over.

== Notable people ==
- Alonzo L. Best, Wisconsin State representative, farmer, and teacher; served as Tiffany Town Board chairman
- John M. Oddie, Wisconsin State representative and farmer; served on the Tiffany Town Board
