= West Marshland, Wisconsin =

- Town
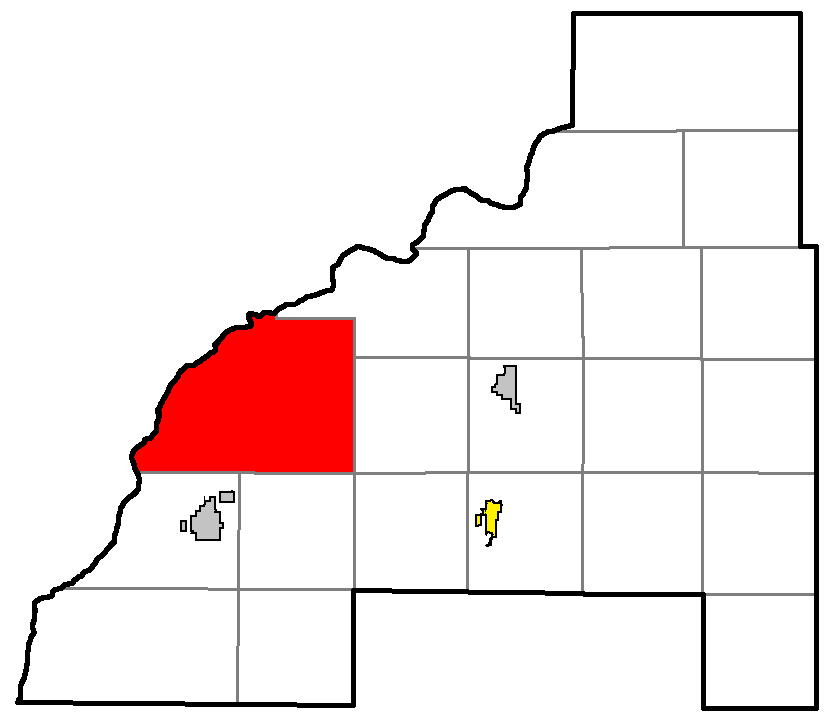
- Location of West Marshland, within Burnett County
- Coordinates: 45°52′18″N 92°38′1″W
- Country: United States
- State: Wisconsin
- County: Burnett

Area
  - Total: 73.4 sq mi (190.2 km^{2})
  - Land: 69.4 sq mi (179.8 km^{2})
  - Water: 4.0 sq mi (10.4 km^{2})
- Elevation: 945 ft (288 m)

Population (2020)
  - Total: 400
  - Density: 5.8/sq mi (2.2/km^{2})
- Time zone: UTC-6 (Central (CST))
  - Summer (DST): UTC-5 (CDT)
- Area codes: 715 & 534
- FIPS code: 55-85850
- GNIS feature ID: 1584409

West Marshland is a town in Burnett County in the U.S. state of Wisconsin. The population was 400 at the 2020 census.

== Geography ==
West Marshland is in western Burnett County. Its western border follows the St. Croix River, the boundary between Wisconsin and Minnesota. According to the United States Census Bureau, the town has a total area of 73.4 square miles (190.2 km^{2}), of which 69.4 square miles (179.8 km^{2}) is land and 4.0 square miles (10.4 km^{2}), or 5.45%, is water.

== Demographics ==
As of the census of 2000, there were 331 people, 123 households, and 85 families residing in the town. The population density was 4.8 people per square mile (1.8/km^{2}). There were 185 housing units at an average density of 2.7 per square mile (1.0/km^{2}). The racial makeup of the town was 89.43% White, 2.11% African American, 3.93% Native American, 0.60% Asian, 1.81% from other races, and 2.11% from two or more races. Hispanic or Latino of any race were 4.83% of the population.

There were 123 households, out of which 29.3% had children under the age of 18 living with them, 64.2% were married couples living together, 4.1% had a female householder with no husband present, and 30.1% were non-families. 24.4% of all households were made up of individuals, and 10.6% had someone living alone who was 65 years of age or older. The average household size was 2.69 and the average family size was 3.27.

In the town, the population was spread out, with 26.9% under the age of 18, 8.2% from 18 to 24, 28.7% from 25 to 44, 28.1% from 45 to 64, and 8.2% who were 65 years of age or older. The median age was 36 years. For every 100 females, there were 101.8 males. For every 100 females age 18 and over, there were 103.4 males.

The median income for a household in the town was $40,625, and the median income for a family was $48,750. Males had a median income of $26,364 versus $28,125 for females. The per capita income for the town was $16,552. About 1.3% of families and 5.6% of the population were below the poverty line, including 6.6% of those under age 18 and 12.5% of those age 65 or over.
