= Bone Lake, Wisconsin =

Town of Bone Lake
- Town
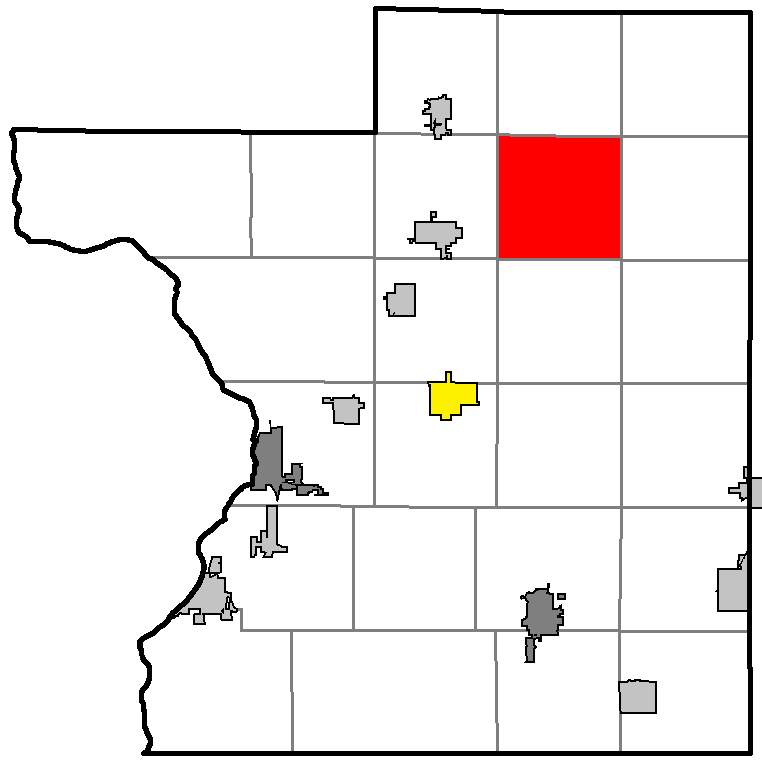
- Location of Bone Lake, within Polk County

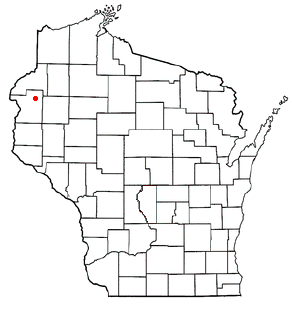
- Location of the Town of Bone Lake
- Coordinates: 45°34′48″N 92°20′26″W
- Country: United States
- State: Wisconsin
- County: Polk

Area
  - Total: 35.4 sq mi (91.7 km^{2})
  - Land: 33.6 sq mi (86.9 km^{2})
  - Water: 1.9 sq mi (4.8 km^{2})
- Elevation: 1,240 ft (378 m)

Population (2020)
  - Total: 686
  - Density: 20.4/sq mi (7.89/km^{2})
- Time zone: UTC-6 (Central (CST))
  - Summer (DST): UTC-5 (CDT)
- Area codes: 715 & 534
- FIPS code: 55-08750
- GNIS feature ID: 1582842
- Website: https://www.townofbonelake.org/

Bone Lake is a town in Polk County, Wisconsin, United States. The population was 686 at the 2020 census.

== Geography ==
According to the United States Census Bureau, the town has a total area of 35.4 square miles (92 km^{2}), of which 33.6 square miles (87 km^{2}) is land and 1.9 square miles (4.9 km^{2}) (5.25%) is water.

== Demographics ==
As of the census of 2000, there were 710 people, 264 households, and 210 families residing in the town. The population density was 21.2 people per square mile (8.2 people/km^{2}). There were 434 housing units at an average density of 12.9 per square mile (5.0/km^{2}). The racial makeup of the town was 97.46% White, 0.14% African American, 1.41% Native American, 0.28% Asian, and 0.70% from two or more races. Hispanic or Latino of any race were 0.14% of the population.

There were 264 households, out of which 33.3% had children under the age of 18 living with them, 71.6% were married couples living together, 5.3% had a female householder with no husband present, and 20.1% were non-families. 15.9% of all households were made up of individuals, and 8.3% had someone living alone who was 65 years of age or older. The average household size was 2.69 and the average family size was 3.00.

In the town, the population was spread out, with 26.2% under the age of 18, 5.1% from 18 to 24, 26.5% from 25 to 44, 27.2% from 45 to 64, and 15.1% who were 65 years of age or older. The median age was 40 years. For every 100 females, there were 101.1 males. For every 100 females age 18 and over, there were 98.5 males.

The median income for a household in the town was $39,821, and the median income for a family was $45,568. Males had a median income of $32,188 versus $19,375 for females. The per capita income for the town was $16,701. About 6.1% of families and 8.1% of the population were below the poverty line, including 7.7% of those under age 18 and 11.7% of those age 65 or over.
