= Black Brook, Wisconsin =

- Town
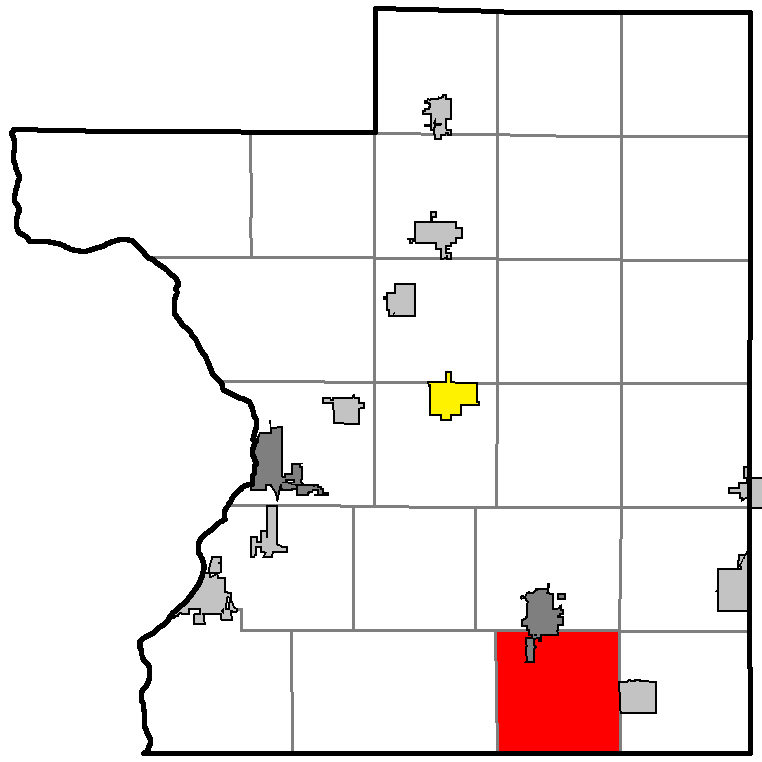
- Location of Black Brook, within Polk County

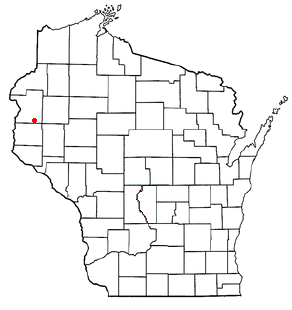
- Location of Black Brook, Wisconsin
- Coordinates: 45°14′56″N 92°21′8″W
- Country: United States
- State: Wisconsin
- County: Polk

Area
  - Total: 34.9 sq mi (90.5 km^{2})
  - Land: 34.2 sq mi (88.7 km^{2})
  - Water: 0.69 sq mi (1.8 km^{2})
- Elevation: 1,168 ft (356 m)

Population (2020)
  - Total: 1,425
  - Density: 41.6/sq mi (16.1/km^{2})
- Time zone: UTC-6 (Central (CST))
  - Summer (DST): UTC-5 (CDT)
- Area codes: 715 & 534
- FIPS code: 55-07700
- GNIS feature ID: 1582817
- Website: https://www.blackbrookwi.gov/

Black Brook is a town in Polk County, Wisconsin, United States. The population was 1,425 at the 2020 census.

== Geography ==
According to the United States Census Bureau, the town has a total area of 34.9 square miles (90.5 km^{2}), of which 34.2 square miles (88.7 km^{2}) is land and 0.7 square mile (1.8 km^{2}) (1.97%) is water.

== Demographics ==
At the 2000 census there were 1,208 people, 419 households, and 326 families in the town. The population density was 35.3 people per square mile (13.6/km^{2}). There were 448 housing units at an average density of 13.1 per square mile (5.1/km^{2}). The racial makeup of the town was 99.01% White, 0.25% Native American, 0.08% from other races, and 0.66% from two or more races. Hispanic or Latino of any race were 0.91%.

Of the 419 households 41.5% had children under the age of 18 living with them, 67.1% were married couples living together, 5.7% had a female householder with no husband present, and 22.0% were non-families. 16.9% of households were one person and 4.3% were one person aged 65 or older. The average household size was 2.88 and the average family size was 3.26.

The age distribution was 31.3% under the age of 18, 6.5% from 18 to 24, 30.7% from 25 to 44, 22.6% from 45 to 64, and 8.9% 65 or older. The median age was 36 years. For every 100 females, there were 109.7 males. For every 100 females age 18 and over, there were 107.0 males.

The median household income was $48,125 and the median family income was $50,543. Males had a median income of $34,554 versus $23,684 for females. The per capita income for the town was $19,286. About 4.7% of families and 6.5% of the population were below the poverty line, including 8.2% of those under age 18 and 1.0% of those age 65 or over.
