= Lincoln, Burnett County, Wisconsin =

Lincoln, Wisconsin
- Town
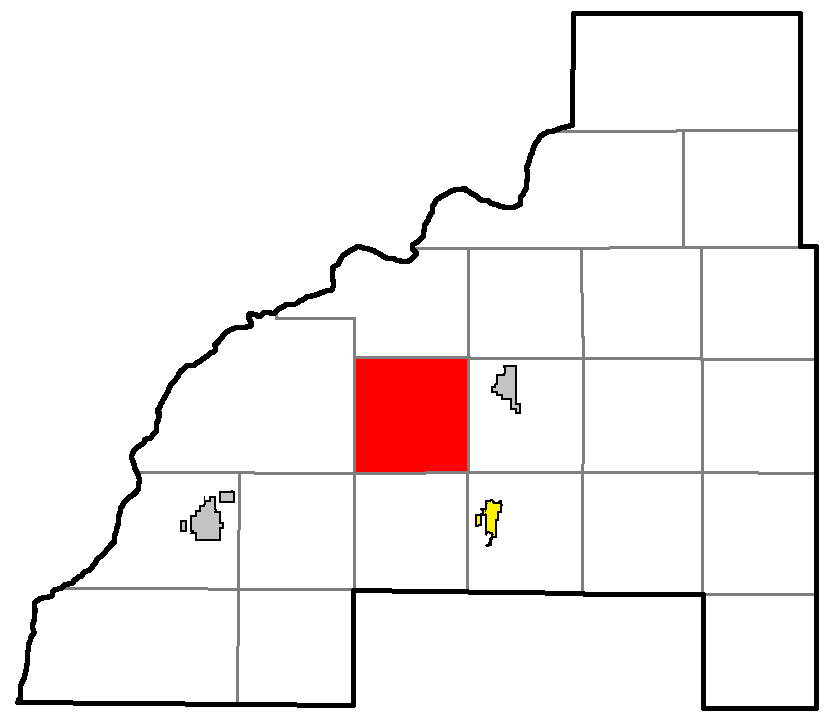
- Location of Lincoln, within Burnett County
- Coordinates: 45°51′45″N 92°28′15″W
- Country: United States
- State: Wisconsin
- County: Burnett

Area
  - Total: 35.2 sq mi (91.1 km^{2})
  - Land: 34.8 sq mi (90.2 km^{2})
  - Water: 0.35 sq mi (0.9 km^{2})
- Elevation: 971 ft (296 m)

Population (2020)
  - Total: 367
  - Density: 10.5/sq mi (4.07/km^{2})
- Time zone: UTC-6 (Central (CST))
  - Summer (DST): UTC-5 (CDT)
- Area codes: 715 & 534
- FIPS code: 55-44325
- GNIS feature ID: 1583563
- Website: townoflincolnbc.com

Lincoln is a town in Burnett County in the U.S. state of Wisconsin. The population was 367 at the 2020 census.

== Geography ==
According to the United States Census Bureau, the town has a total area of 35.2 square miles (91.1 km^{2}), of which 34.8 square miles (90.2 km^{2}) is land and 0.39 square miles (1.0 km^{2}), or 0.98%, is water.

== Demographics ==
As of the census of 2000, there were 286 people, 127 households, and 89 families residing in the town. The population density was 8.2 people per square mile (3.2/km^{2}). There were 182 housing units at an average density of 5.2 per square mile (2.0/km^{2}). The racial makeup of the town was 95.80% White, 1.05% Native American, 0.70% Pacific Islander, and 2.45% from two or more races. Hispanic or Latino of any race were 0.70% of the population.

There were 127 households, out of which 26.0% had children under the age of 18 living with them, 56.7% were married couples living together, 8.7% had a female householder with no husband present, and 29.9% were non-families. 25.2% of all households were made up of individuals, and 10.2% had someone living alone who was 65 years of age or older. The average household size was 2.25 and the average family size was 2.65.

In the town, the population was spread out, with 18.5% under the age of 18, 6.3% from 18 to 24, 25.9% from 25 to 44, 35.7% from 45 to 64, and 13.6% who were 65 years of age or older. The median age was 44 years. For every 100 females, there were 100.0 males. For every 100 females age 18 and over, there were 97.5 males.

The median income for a household in the town was $31,786, and the median income for a family was $44,167. Males had a median income of $36,875 versus $19,464 for females. The per capita income for the town was $16,300. About 3.6% of families and 7.7% of the population were below the poverty line, including 22.4% of those under the age of eighteen and none of those 65 or over.
