= Stanton, Dunn County, Wisconsin =

Stanton, Wisconsin
- Town
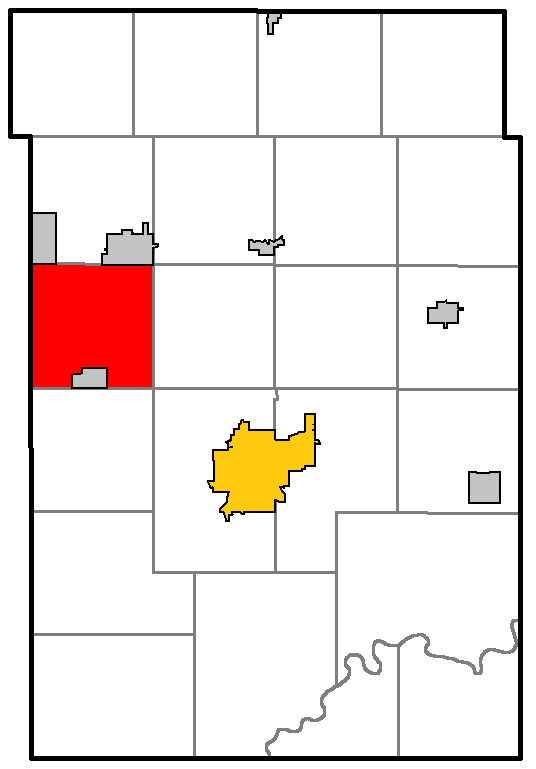
- Location of Stanton, within Dunn County

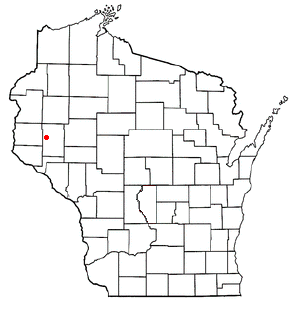
- Location of Stanton, Wisconsin
- Coordinates: 44°58′10″N 92°4′52″W
- Country: United States
- State: Wisconsin
- County: Dunn

Area
  - Total: 33.9 sq mi (87.7 km^{2})
  - Land: 33.9 sq mi (87.7 km^{2})
  - Water: 0 sq mi (0.0 km^{2})
- Elevation: 1,168 ft (356 m)

Population (2020)
  - Total: 758
  - Density: 22.4/sq mi (8.64/km^{2})
- Time zone: UTC-6 (Central (CST))
  - Summer (DST): UTC-5 (CDT)
- Area codes: 715 & 534
- FIPS code: 55-76650
- GNIS feature ID: 1584211
- Website: https://townofstanton.org/

Stanton is a town in Dunn County, Wisconsin, United States. The population was 758 at the 2020 census.

== Geography ==
According to the United States Census Bureau, the town has a total area of 33.9 square miles (87.7 km^{2}), all land.

== Demographics ==
Historical population
Census	Pop.	Note	%±
1990	637		—
2000	715		12.2%
2010	791		10.6%
2020	758		−4.2%

As of the census of 2000, there were 715 people, 247 households, and 196 families residing in the town. The population density was 21.1 people per square mile (8.2/km^{2}). There were 257 housing units at an average density of 7.6 per square mile (2.9/km^{2}). The racial makeup of the town was 97.90% White, 0.56% Asian, 0.56% from other races, and 0.98% from two or more races. Hispanic or Latino of any race were 2.52% of the population.

There were 247 households, out of which 40.9% had children under the age of 18 living with them, 68.4% were married couples living together, 6.9% had a female householder with no husband present, and 20.6% were non-families. 14.2% of all households were made up of individuals, and 5.7% had someone living alone who was 65 years of age or older. The average household size was 2.89 and the average family size was 3.20.

In the town, the population was spread out, with 29.8% under the age of 18, 8.1% from 18 to 24, 30.1% from 25 to 44, 23.9% from 45 to 64, and 8.1% who were 65 years of age or older. The median age was 36 years. For every 100 females, there were 107.2 males. For every 100 females age 18 and over, there were 109.2 males.

The median income for a household in the town was $45,781, and the median income for a family was $48,750. Males had a median income of $31,131 versus $26,250 for females. The per capita income for the town was $15,398. About 6.4% of families and 10.7% of the population were below the poverty line, including 13.0% of those under age 18 and 3.4% of those age 65 or over.
