= Ridgeland, Wisconsin =

- Village
- Location of Ridgeland in Dunn County, Wisconsin.
- Coordinates: 45°12′15″N 91°53′51″W
- Country: United States
- State: Wisconsin
- County: Dunn

Area
  - Total: 0.46 sq mi (1.19 km^{2})
  - Land: 0.46 sq mi (1.19 km^{2})
  - Water: 0 sq mi (0.00 km^{2})
- Elevation: 1,096 ft (334 m)

Population (2020)
  - Total: 258
  - Density: 562/sq mi (217/km^{2})
- Time zone: UTC-6 (Central (CST))
  - Summer (DST): UTC-5 (CDT)
- Area codes: 715 & 534
- FIPS code: 55-67800
- GNIS feature ID: 1572302
- Website: https://www.ridgelandwi.com/

Ridgeland is a village in Dunn County, Wisconsin, United States. The population was 258 at the 2020 census.

== History ==
The village was founded in 1900 by George M Huss, President of the Ridgeland Land Company, coinciding with the rise of railroads. The village was formerly named Annesburg. It was first a model community built to accommodate rail workers.

The Blueberry Line connected Ridgeland to Barron, and was completed in 1900. It was envisioned by the Rice Lake, Dallas and Menomonie Railway, but these plans did not materialise. At the railroad's peak, the line had 65 cars, transporting livestock, potatoes and grain.

The village was incorporated in 1921, with electricity installed in the 1920s. Sidewalks were built in 1935, and a fire hall was built in 1953. A sanitary sewer plant was established in 1957.

The Ridgeland section of the Blueberry Line closed in 1963.

== Geography ==
Ridgeland is located at 45°12′15″N 91°53′51″W (45.204183, -91.897478).

According to the United States Census Bureau, the village has a total area of 0.43 square miles (1.11 km^{2}), all land.

=== Climate ===
Climate data for Ridgeland, Wisconsin (1991–2020 normals, extremes 1961–present)
Month	Jan	Feb	Mar	Apr	May	Jun	Jul	Aug	Sep	Oct	Nov	Dec	Year
Record high °F (°C)	54 (12)	61 (16)	80 (27)	91 (33)	94 (34)	97 (36)	100 (38)	102 (39)	96 (36)	88 (31)	75 (24)	61 (16)	102 (39)
Mean daily maximum °F (°C)	21.3 (−5.9)	26.2 (−3.2)	38.6 (3.7)	53.9 (12.2)	67.0 (19.4)	76.1 (24.5)	80.2 (26.8)	78.0 (25.6)	70.2 (21.2)	56.3 (13.5)	40.3 (4.6)	26.9 (−2.8)	52.9 (11.6)
Daily mean °F (°C)	11.9 (−11.2)	15.6 (−9.1)	28.2 (−2.1)	42.5 (5.8)	55.2 (12.9)	65.1 (18.4)	69.2 (20.7)	66.7 (19.3)	58.4 (14.7)	45.6 (7.6)	31.7 (−0.2)	18.5 (−7.5)	42.4 (5.8)
Mean daily minimum °F (°C)	2.4 (−16.4)	5.0 (−15.0)	17.9 (−7.8)	31.2 (−0.4)	43.5 (6.4)	54.2 (12.3)	58.1 (14.5)	55.4 (13.0)	46.5 (8.1)	35.0 (1.7)	23.2 (−4.9)	10.0 (−12.2)	31.9 (−0.1)
Record low °F (°C)	−47 (−44)	−38 (−39)	−41 (−41)	−3 (−19)	16 (−9)	29 (−2)	37 (3)	32 (0)	21 (−6)	6 (−14)	−21 (−29)	−42 (−41)	−47 (−44)
Average precipitation inches (mm)	1.04 (26)	1.16 (29)	2.14 (54)	3.34 (85)	4.08 (104)	4.73 (120)	4.52 (115)	4.51 (115)	3.65 (93)	3.07 (78)	1.94 (49)	1.44 (37)	35.62 (905)
Average snowfall inches (cm)	9.5 (24)	11.4 (29)	10.9 (28)	3.3 (8.4)	0.0 (0.0)	0.0 (0.0)	0.0 (0.0)	0.0 (0.0)	0.0 (0.0)	0.6 (1.5)	4.1 (10)	11.2 (28)	51.0 (130)
Average precipitation days (≥ 0.01 in)	6.3	5.4	7.1	9.7	11.3	11.3	9.4	9.5	10.0	9.1	6.8	6.6	102.5
Average snowy days (≥ 0.1 in)	4.6	4.2	3.6	1.3	0.0	0.0	0.0	0.0	0.0	0.2	1.9	4.8	20.6
Source: NOAA

== Demographics ==
Historical population
Census	Pop.	Note	%±
1930	197		—
1940	242		22.8%
1950	273		12.8%
1960	288		5.5%
1970	266		−7.6%
1980	300		12.8%
1990	246		−18.0%
2000	265		7.7%
2010	273		3.0%
2020	258		−5.5%
U.S. Decennial Census

=== 2021 census ===
As of the census of 2021, there were 258 people, 127 households, and 54 families living in the village. The population density was 556.80/mi^{2}. There were 144 housing units. The racial makeup of the village was 99.6% White and 0.39% from two or more races.

There were 127 households, of which 35% had children under the age of 18 living with them, 57.5% were married couples living together, 0.6% had a female householder with no spouse present, 14.0% had a male householder with no spouse present, and 43.3% were non-families. 52.0% of all households were made up of individuals, and 28.3% had someone living alone who was 65 years of age or older. The average household size was 2.03 and the average family size was 2.69.

The median age in the village was 46.3 years. 26.0% of residents were under the age of 18; 3.9% were between the ages of 18 and 24; 18.6% were from 25 to 44; 26.4% were from 45 to 64; and 25.2% were 65 years of age or older. The gender makeup of the village was 55.2% male and 44.6% female.

=== 2010 census ===
As of the census of 2010, there were 273 people, 127 households, and 72 families living in the village. The population density was 634.9 inhabitants per square mile (245.1/km^{2}). There were 138 housing units at an average density of 320.9 per square mile (123.9/km^{2}). The racial makeup of the village was 97.4% White, 0.7% Asian, and 1.8% from two or more races.

There were 127 households, of which 28.3% had children under the age of 18 living with them, 44.9% were married couples living together, 7.1% had a female householder with no husband present, 4.7% had a male householder with no wife present, and 43.3% were non-families. 38.6% of all households were made up of individuals, and 19.7% had someone living alone who was 65 years of age or older. The average household size was 2.15 and the average family size was 2.85.

The median age in the village was 42.1 years. 23.4% of residents were under the age of 18; 4.8% were between the ages of 18 and 24; 25.4% were from 25 to 44; 23.8% were from 45 to 64; and 22.7% were 65 years of age or older. The gender makeup of the village was 49.1% male and 50.9% female.

=== 2000 census ===
As of the census of 2000, there were 265 people, 123 households, and 70 families living in the village. The population density was 625.0 people per square mile (243.6/km^{2}). There were 131 housing units at an average density of 309.0 per square mile (120.4/km^{2}). The racial makeup of the village was 99.25% White, 0.38% from other races, and 0.38% from two or more races. Hispanic or Latino of any race were 0.38% of the population.

There were 123 households, out of which 27.6% had children under the age of 18 living with them, 46.3% were married couples living together, 8.9% had a female householder with no husband present, and 42.3% were non-families. 41.5% of all households were made up of individuals, and 26.0% had someone living alone who was 65 years of age or older. The average household size was 2.15 and the average family size was 2.93.

In the village, the population was spread out, with 26.8% under the age of 18, 3.8% from 18 to 24, 23.0% from 25 to 44, 17.0% from 45 to 64, and 29.4% who were 65 years of age or older. The median age was 40 years. For every 100 females, there were 84.0 males. For every 100 females age 18 and over, there were 78.0 males.

The median income for a household in the village was $25,000, and the median income for a family was $36,875. Males had a median income of $24,844 versus $21,125 for females. The per capita income for the village was $13,257. About 12.5% of families and 15.8% of the population were below the poverty line, including 17.6% of those under the age of eighteen and 26.0% of those 65 or over.

== Town name ==
The name Ridgeland was given because of wooded ridges which surround it. The community of Annesburg was located 1/2 - 1 mile north.<local historian>
