= Clear Lake (town), Wisconsin =

Town in Polk County, Wisconsin, United States

Clear Lake, Wisconsin
- Town
- Town of Clear Lake
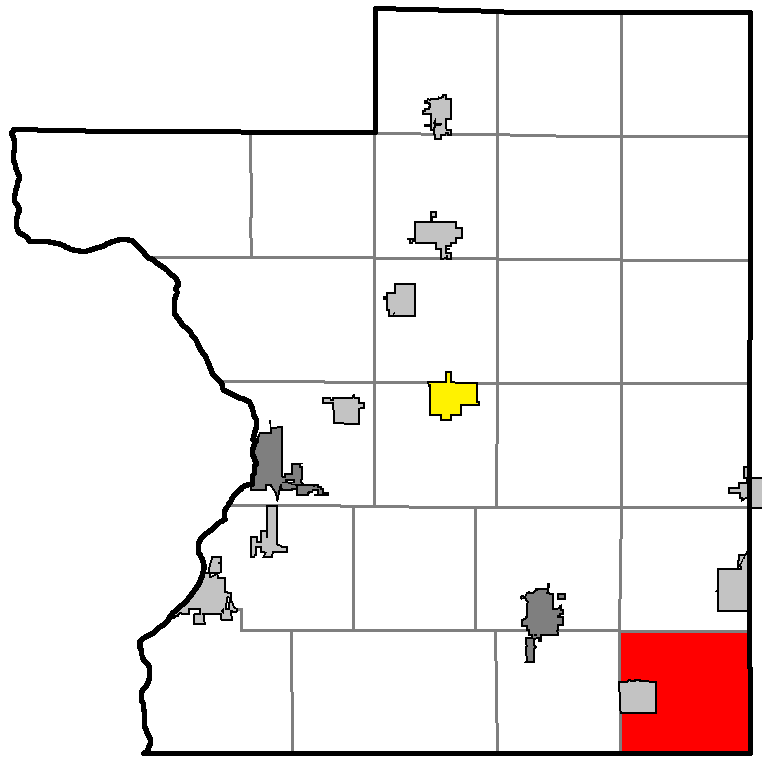
- Location of Clear Lake, within Polk County

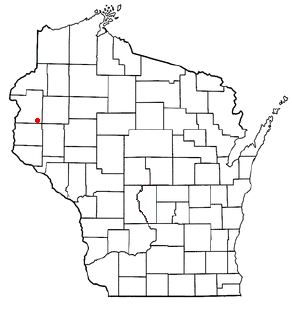
- Location of Clear Lake, Wisconsin
- Coordinates: 45°14′56″N 92°12′55″W
- Country: United States
- State: Wisconsin
- County: Polk

Area
  - Total: 34.69 sq mi (89.8 km^{2})
  - Land: 34.56 sq mi (89.5 km^{2})
  - Water: 0.13 sq mi (0.34 km^{2})

Population (2020)
  - Total: 888
  - Density: 25.7/sq mi (9.92/km^{2})
- Time zone: UTC-6 (Central (CST))
  - Summer (DST): UTC-5 (CDT)
- Area code(s): 715 and 534
- GNIS feature ID: 1582973

Clear Lake is a town in Polk County, Wisconsin, United States. The population was 888 at the 2020 census. The Village of Clear Lake is located within the town.

== Geography ==
According to the United States Census Bureau, the town has a total area of 34.6 square miles (89.6 km^{2}), of which 34.5 square miles (89.4 km^{2}) is land and 0.1 square mile (0.2 km^{2}) (0.23%) is water.

== Demographics ==
As of the census of 2000, there were 800 people, 276 households, and 211 families residing in the town. The population density was 23.2 people per square mile (8.9/km^{2}). There were 290 housing units at an average density of 8.4 per square mile (3.2/km^{2}). The racial makeup of the town was 97.62% White, 0.25% Black or African American, 0.25% Native American, 0.62% from other races, and 1.25% from two or more races. 0.88% of the population were Hispanic or Latino of any race.

There were 276 households, out of which 37.7% had children under the age of 18 living with them, 69.9% were married couples living together, 2.9% had a female householder with no husband present, and 23.2% were non-families. 17.0% of all households were made up of individuals, and 5.1% had someone living alone who was 65 years of age or older. The average household size was 2.90 and the average family size was 3.31.

In the town, the population was spread out, with 28.6% under the age of 18, 8.4% from 18 to 24, 30.6% from 25 to 44, 23.4% from 45 to 64, and 9.0% who were 65 years of age or older. The median age was 35 years. For every 100 females, there were 114.5 males. For every 100 females age 18 and over, there were 120.5 males.

The median income for a household in the town was $48,542, and the median income for a family was $52,885. Males had a median income of $33,068 versus $20,588 for females. The per capita income for the town was $18,009. About 3.2% of families and 6.3% of the population were below the poverty line, including 10.0% of those under age 18 and 2.9% of those age 65 or over.
