= Downing, Wisconsin =

- Village
- Location of Downing in Dunn County, Wisconsin.
- Coordinates: 45°2′48″N 92°7′43″W
- Country: United States
- State: Wisconsin
- County: Dunn

Area
  - Total: 2.95 sq mi (7.65 km^{2})
  - Land: 2.95 sq mi (7.65 km^{2})
  - Water: 0 sq mi (0.00 km^{2})
- Elevation: 981 ft (299 m)

Population (2020)
  - Total: 234
  - Density: 89.0/sq mi (34.37/km^{2})
- Time zone: UTC-6 (Central (CST))
  - Summer (DST): UTC-5 (CDT)
- Area codes: 715 & 534
- FIPS code: 55-20675
- GNIS feature ID: 1564091
- Website: https://downingwi.com/

Downing is a village in Dunn County, Wisconsin, United States. Bordering St. Croix County to the west, the village is otherwise surrounded by the Town of Tiffany. The population was 234 at the 2020 census.

== Geography ==
Downing is located at 45°2′48″N 92°7′43″W (45.046676, -92.128496).

According to the United States Census Bureau, the village has a total area of 2.96 square miles (7.67 km^{2}), all land.

== Demographics ==
Historical population
| Census | Pop. | Note | %± |
|---|---|---|---|
| 1910 | 319 | | — |
| 1920 | 374 | | 17.2% |
| 1930 | 302 | | −19.3% |
| 1940 | 308 | | 2.0% |
| 1950 | 295 | | −4.2% |
| 1960 | 241 | | −18.3% |
| 1970 | 215 | | −10.8% |
| 1980 | 242 | | 12.6% |
| 1990 | 250 | | 3.3% |
| 2000 | 257 | | 2.8% |
| 2010 | 265 | | 3.1% |
| 2020 | 234 | | −11.7% |
U.S. Decennial Census

=== 2010 census ===
As of the census of 2010, there were 265 people, 97 households, and 73 families living in the village. The population density was 89.5 inhabitants per square mile (34.6/km^{2}). There were 108 housing units at an average density of 36.5 per square mile (14.1/km^{2}). The racial makeup of the village was 99.2% White, 0.4% Native American, and 0.4% from other races. Hispanic or Latino of any race were 0.4% of the population.

There were 97 households, of which 39.2% had children under the age of 18 living with them, 59.8% were married couples living together, 10.3% had a female householder with no husband present, 5.2% had a male householder with no wife present, and 24.7% were non-families. 16.5% of all households were made up of individuals, and 5.1% had someone living alone who was 65 years of age or older. The average household size was 2.73 and the average family size was 3.08.

The median age in the village was 37.3 years. 28.3% of residents were under the age of 18; 6% were between the ages of 18 and 24; 26.9% were from 25 to 44; 27.1% were from 45 to 64; and 11.7% were 65 years of age or older. The gender makeup of the village was 49.8% male and 50.2% female.

=== 2000 census ===
As of the census of 2000, there were 257 people, 98 households, and 69 families living in the village. The population density was 86.4 people per square mile (33.4/km^{2}). There were 107 housing units at an average density of 36.0 per square mile (13.9/km^{2}). The racial makeup of the village was 98.44% White, 0.39% Native American, and 1.17% from two or more races. Hispanic or Latino of any race were 1.17% of the population.

There were 98 households, out of which 30.6% had children under the age of 18 living with them, 60.2% were married couples living together, 5.1% had a female householder with no husband present, and 28.6% were non-families. 19.4% of all households were made up of individuals, and 10.2% had someone living alone who was 65 years of age or older. The average household size was 2.62 and the average family size was 3.04.

In the village, the population was spread out, with 25.3% under the age of 18, 10.5% from 18 to 24, 29.2% from 25 to 44, 23.0% from 45 to 64, and 12.1% who were 65 years of age or older. The median age was 35 years. For every 100 females, there were 117.8 males. For every 100 females age 18 and over, there were 128.6 males.

The median income for a household in the village was $41,375, and the median income for a family was $40,375. Males had a median income of $27,500 versus $20,625 for females. The per capita income for the village was $17,927. About 8.0% of families and 5.7% of the population were below the poverty line, including 6.5% of those under the age of eighteen and 16.3% of those 65 or over.
