= Laketown, Wisconsin =

- Town
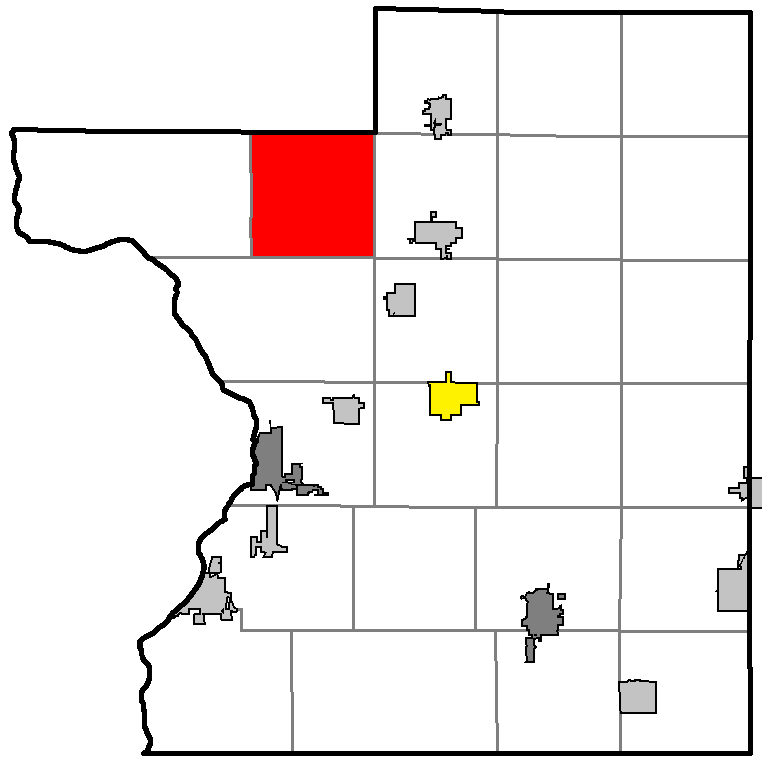
- Location of Laketown, within Polk County

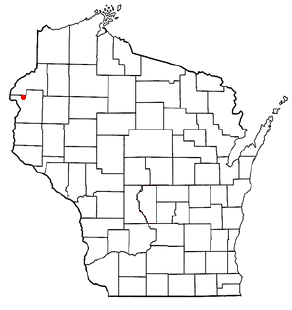
- Location of Laketown, Wisconsin
- Coordinates: 45°36′24″N 92°35′23″W
- Country: United States
- State: Wisconsin
- County: Polk

Area
  - Total: 35.8 sq mi (92.6 km^{2})
  - Land: 34.2 sq mi (88.7 km^{2})
  - Water: 1.5 sq mi (4.0 km^{2})
- Elevation: 1,014 ft (309 m)

Population (2020)
  - Total: 1,024
  - Density: 29.9/sq mi (11.5/km^{2})
- Time zone: UTC-6 (Central (CST))
  - Summer (DST): UTC-5 (CDT)
- Area codes: 715 & 534
- FIPS code: 55-41900
- GNIS feature ID: 1583519
- Website: https://townoflaketown.org/

Laketown is a town in Polk County, Wisconsin, United States. The population was 1,024 at the 2020 census. The unincorporated community of Atlas is in the town. The unincorporated communities of Cushing and Pole Cat Crossing are also partially in the town.

== Geography ==
According to the United States Census Bureau, the town has a total area of 35.8 square miles (92.6 km^{2}), of which 34.2 square miles (88.7 km^{2}) is land and 1.5 square miles (4.0 km^{2}) (4.28%) is water.

== Demographics ==
As of the 2000 census, there were 918 people, 350 households, and 262 families residing in the town. The population density was 26.8 people per square mile (10.4/km^{2}). There were 445 housing units at an average density of 13.0 per square mile (5.0/km^{2}). The racial makeup of the town was 98.47% White, 0.33% African American, 0.11% Native American, 0.33% Asian, 0.54% from other races, and 0.22% from two or more races. Hispanic or Latino of any race were 0.54% of the population.

There were 350 households, of which 31.4% had children under the age of 18 living with them, 66.0% were married couples living together, 6.0% had a female householder with no husband present, and 25.1% were non-families. 20.9% of all households were made up of individuals, and 7.7% had someone living alone who was 65 years of age or older. The average household size was 2.62 and the average family size was 3.03.

In the town, the population was spread out, with 25.6% under the age of 18, 5.7% from 18 to 24, 26.0% from 25 to 44, 29.7% from 45 to 64, and 13.0% who were 65 years of age or older. The median age was 41 years. For every 100 females, there were 98.7 males. For every 100 females age 18 and over, there were 101.5 males.

The median income for a household in the town was $40,156, and the median income for a family was $45,000. Males had a median income of $31,250 versus $20,938 for females. The per capita income was $17,573. About 9.9% of families and 11.7% of the population were below the poverty line, including 13.7% of those under age 18 and 14.1% of those age 65 or over.

== Education ==
- Luck School District
