= Unity School District =

There are several school districts in the United States called Unity School District, including:

- Unity School District — Claremont, New Hampshire
- Unity School District — Balsam Lake, Wisconsin
