= Polk County, Wisconsin =

County in Wisconsin, United States

- County
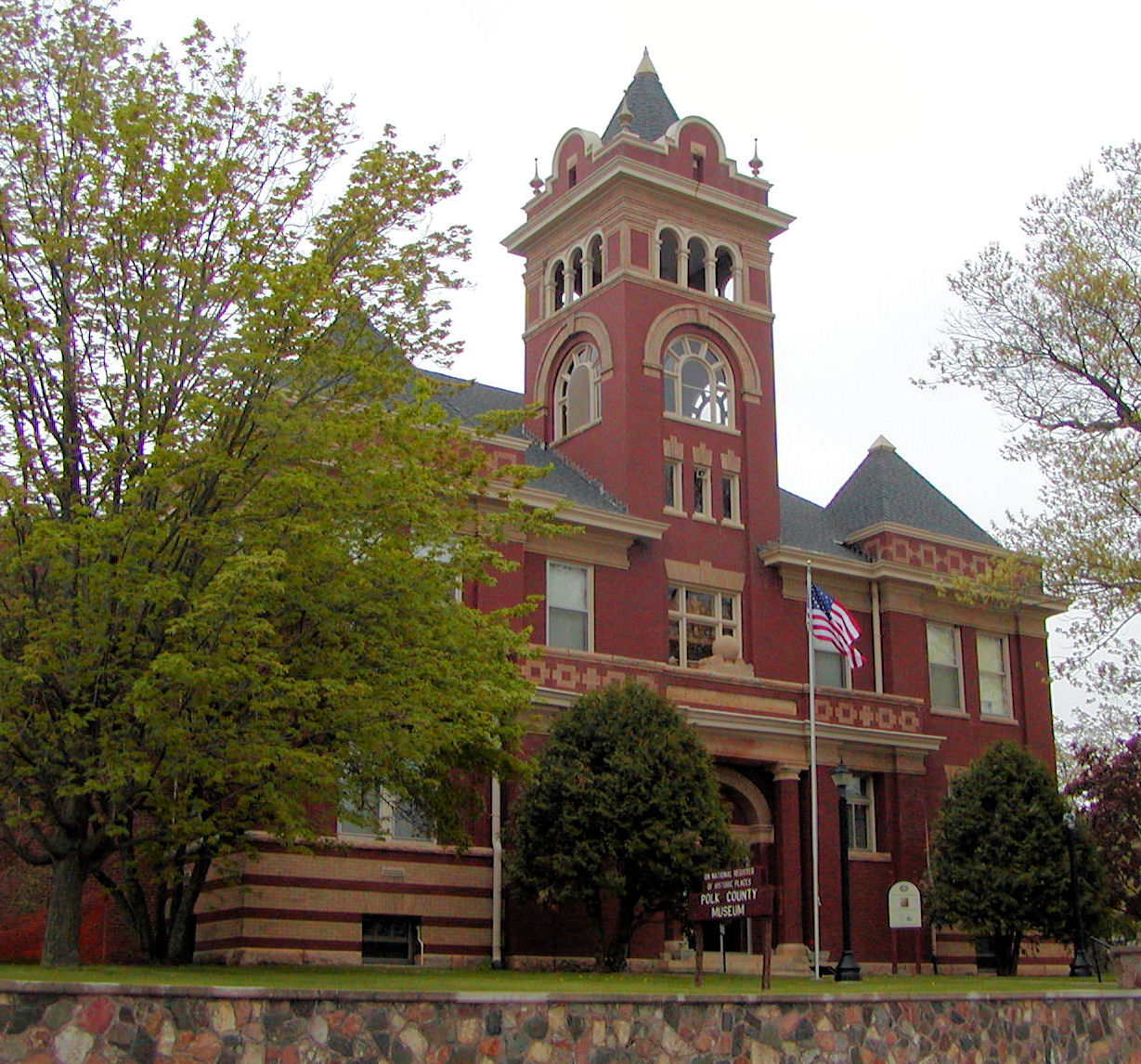
- Old Polk County Courthouse and Museum

- Location within the U.S. state of Wisconsin
- Coordinates: 45°28′N 92°26′W
- Country: United States
- State: Wisconsin
- Founded: 1853
- Named for: James K. Polk
- Seat: Balsam Lake
- Largest city: Amery

Area
  - Total: 956 sq mi (2,480 km^{2})
  - Land: 914 sq mi (2,370 km^{2})
  - Water: 42 sq mi (110 km^{2}) 4.4%

Population (2020)
  - Total: 44,977
  - Estimate (2025): 45,803 ▲
  - Density: 49.2/sq mi (19.0/km^{2})
- Time zone: UTC−6 (Central)
  - Summer (DST): UTC−5 (CDT)
- Congressional district: 7th
- Website: www.polkcountywi.gov

Polk County is the westernmost county in the U.S. state of Wisconsin. As of the 2020 census, the population was 44,977. Its county seat is Balsam Lake. The county was created in 1853 and named for United States President James K. Polk.

== History ==
After the Wisconsin Territory was established in 1836, much of the land was covered in vast pine forests, and logging activates began soon after. In 1837, large amounts of American Indian territories were ceded to the United States via the White Pine Treaty, formally known as the Treaty of St. Peters, the St. Croix Chippewa Indians would become a federally recognized tribe and granted reservation lands.

== Geography ==
Soils of Polk County

According to the U.S. Census Bureau, the county has an area of 956 square miles (2,480 km^{2}), of which 914 square miles (2,370 km^{2}) is land and 42 square miles (110 km^{2}) (4.4%) is water.

=== Adjacent counties ===
- Burnett County – north
- Barron County – east
- Dunn County – southeast
- St. Croix County – south
- Washington County, Minnesota – southwest
- Chisago County, Minnesota – west

=== Major highways ===
- U.S. Highway 8
- U.S. Highway 63
- Highway 35 (Wisconsin)
- Highway 46 (Wisconsin)
- Highway 48 (Wisconsin)
- Highway 65 (Wisconsin)
- Highway 87 (Wisconsin)
- Highway 243 (Wisconsin)

=== Railroads ===
- Canadian National
- Minnesota Transportation Museum

=== Airports ===
- Amery Municipal Airport (KAHH) serves the county and surrounding communities.
- L.O. Simenstad Municipal Airport (KOEO).

=== National protected area ===
- Saint Croix National Scenic Riverway (part)

=== Interstate Park (Wisconsin) ===
Established in 1900, the Interstate park is part of the Saint Croix National Scenic riverway, the Ice Age National Scientific Reserve and is the westernmost point of the Ice Age National Scenic Trail.

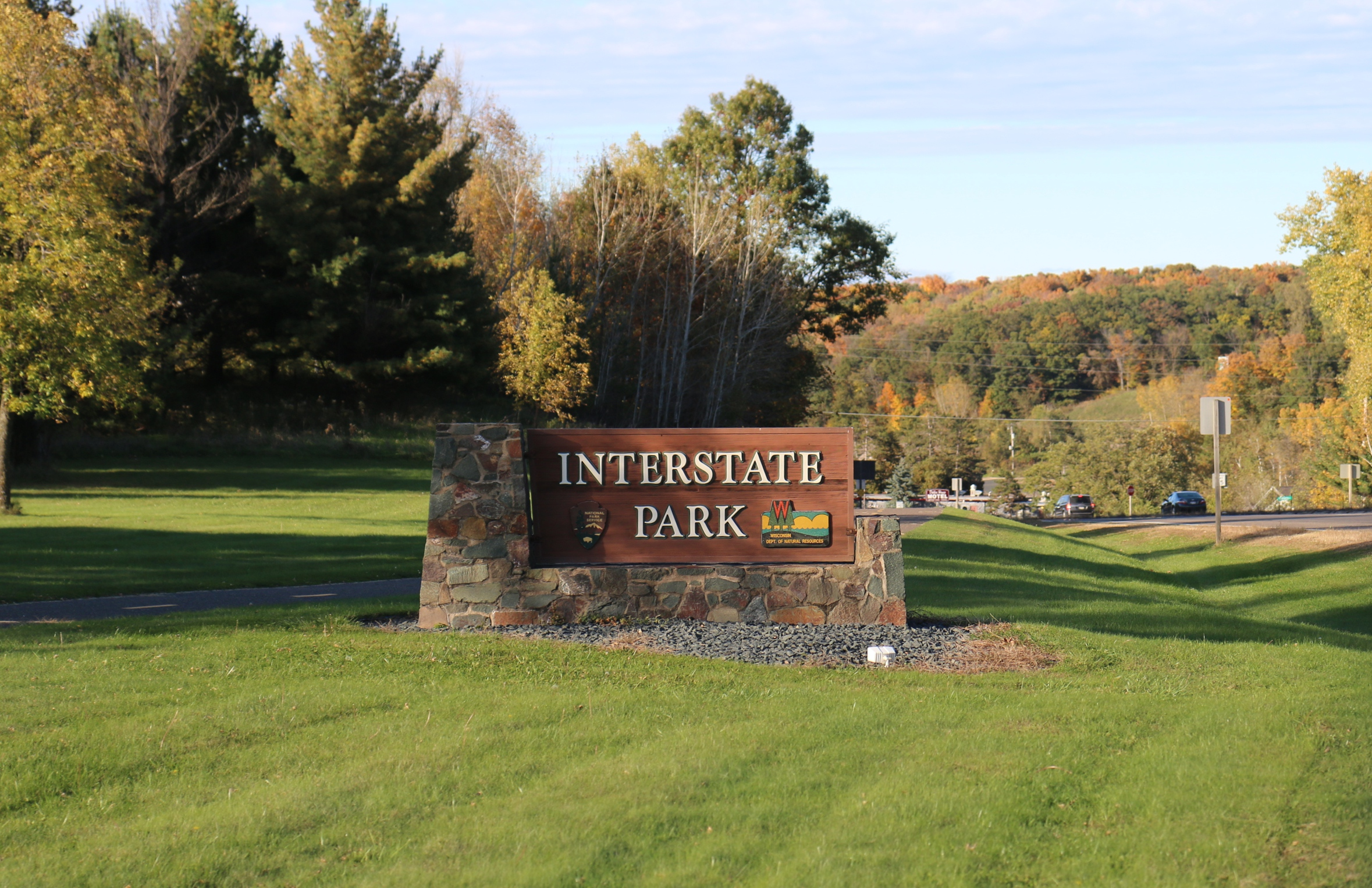

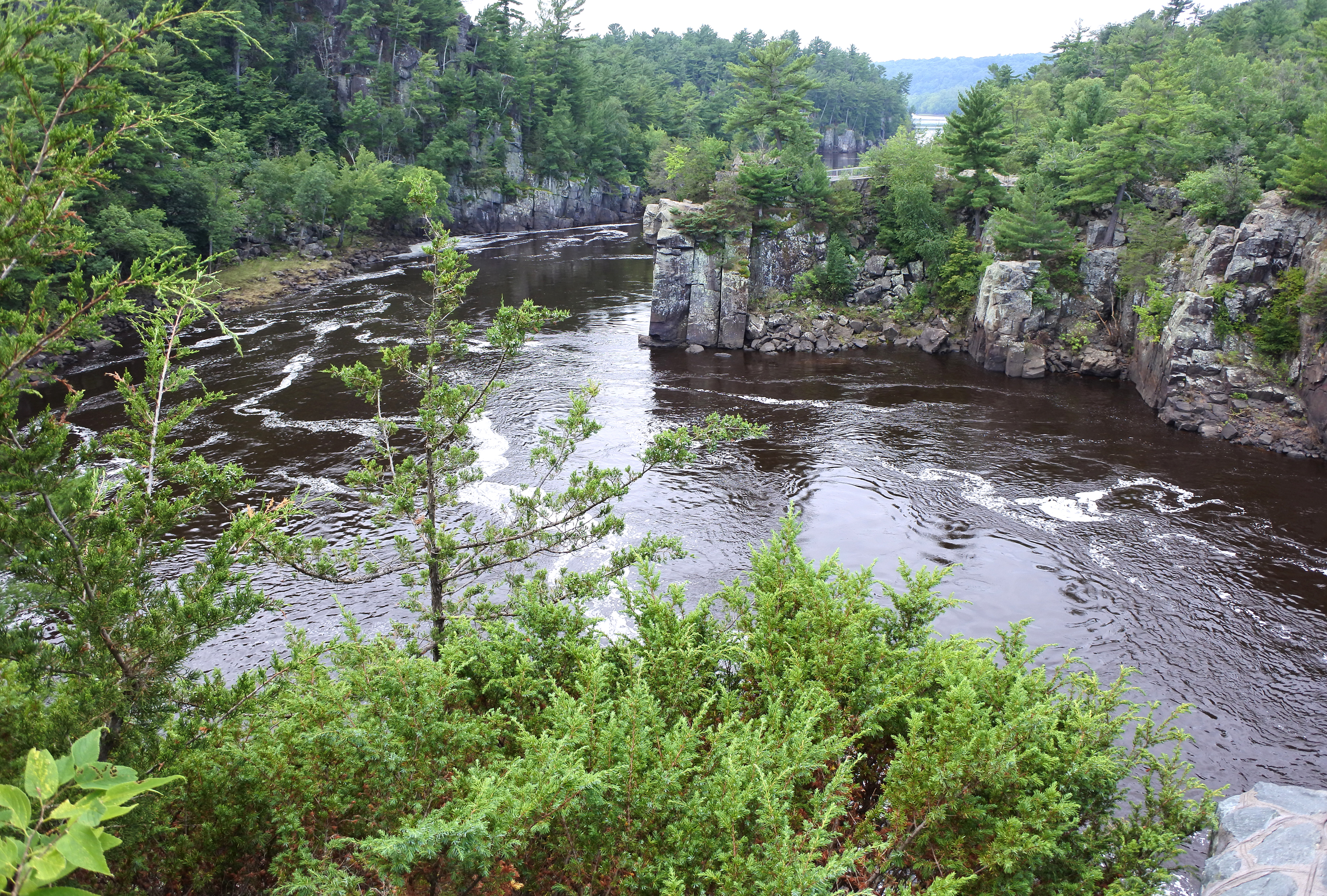

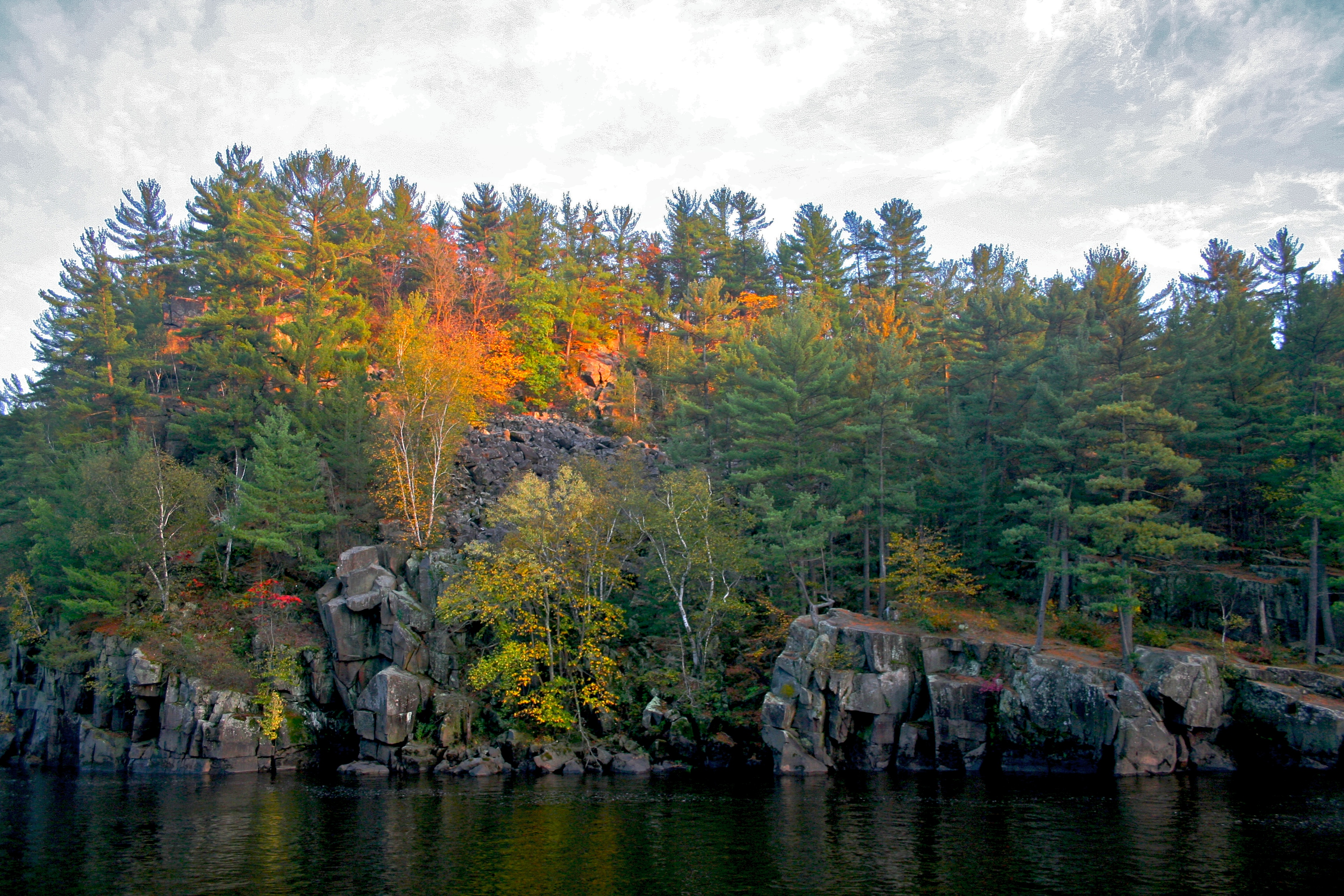

== Demographics ==
Historical population
Census	Pop.	Note	%±
1860	1,400		—
1870	3,422		144.4%
1880	10,018		192.8%
1890	12,968		29.4%
1900	17,801		37.3%
1910	21,367		20.0%
1920	26,870		25.8%
1930	26,567		−1.1%
1940	26,197		−1.4%
1950	24,944		−4.8%
1960	24,968		0.1%
1970	26,666		6.8%
1980	32,351		21.3%
1990	34,773		7.5%
2000	41,319		18.8%
2010	44,205		7.0%
2020	44,977		1.7%
2025 (est.)	45,803	▲	1.8%
U.S. Decennial Census; 1790–1960 1900–1990; 1990–2000 2010 2020

=== Racial and ethnic composition ===
Polk County, Wisconsin – Racial and ethnic composition Note: the US Census treats Hispanic/Latino as an ethnic category. This table excludes Latinos from the racial categories and assigns them to a separate category. Hispanics/Latinos may be of any race.
Race / ethnicity (NH = Non-Hispanic)	Pop 1980	Pop 1990	Pop 2000	Pop 2010	Pop 2020	% 1980	% 1990	% 2000	% 2010	% 2020
White alone (NH)	31,950	34,258	40,131	42,475	41,772	98.76%	98.52%	97.12%	96.09%	92.87%
Black or African American alone (NH)	29	20	56	91	159	0.09%	0.06%	0.14%	0.21%	0.35%
Native American or Alaska Native alone (NH)	215	313	415	424	370	0.66%	0.90%	1.00%	0.96%	0.82%
Asian alone (NH)	52	47	105	148	205	0.16%	0.14%	0.25%	0.33%	0.46%
Native Hawaiian or Pacific Islander alone (NH)	x	x	8	6	7	x	x	0.02%	0.01%	0.02%
Other race alone (NH)	21	4	23	18	130	0.06%	0.01%	0.06%	0.04%	0.29%
Mixed race or Multiracial (NH)	x	x	252	387	1,387	x	x	0.61%	0.88%	3.08%
Hispanic or Latino (any race)	84	131	329	656	947	0.26%	0.38%	0.80%	1.48%	2.11%
Total	32,351	34,773	41,319	44,205	44,977	100.00%	100.00%	100.00%	100.00%	100.00%

=== 2020 census ===
As of the 2020 census, the population was 44,977. The population density was 49.2 people per square mile (19.0 people/km^{2}). There were 24,129 housing units at an average density of 26.4 units per square mile (10.2 units/km^{2}).

The median age was 46.5 years. 20.9% of residents were under the age of 18 and 22.2% of residents were 65 years of age or older. For every 100 females there were 102.9 males, and for every 100 females age 18 and over there were 101.5 males age 18 and over.

The racial makeup of the county was 93.5% White, 0.4% Black or African American, 0.9% American Indian and Alaska Native, 0.5% Asian, <0.1% Native Hawaiian and Pacific Islander, 0.8% from some other race, and 3.9% from two or more races. Hispanic or Latino residents of any race comprised 2.1% of the population.

There were 18,959 households in the county, of which 25.5% had children under the age of 18 living in them. Of all households, 51.0% were married-couple households, 19.8% were households with a male householder and no spouse or partner present, and 20.9% were households with a female householder and no spouse or partner present. About 28.5% of all households were made up of individuals and 13.4% had someone living alone who was 65 years of age or older.

Of the 24,129 housing units, 21.4% were vacant. Among occupied housing units, 79.4% were owner-occupied and 20.6% were renter-occupied. The homeowner vacancy rate was 1.1% and the rental vacancy rate was 4.4%.

<0.1% of residents lived in urban areas, while 100.0% lived in rural areas.

=== 2000 census ===
2000 Census Age Pyramid for Polk County

As of the 2000 census, there were 41,319 people, 16,254 households, and 11,329 families residing in the county. The population density was 45 people per square mile (17 people/km^{2}). There were 21,129 housing units at an average density of 23 units per square mile (8.9 units/km^{2}). The racial makeup of the county was 97.64% White, 0.15% Black or African American, 1.06% Native American, 0.26% Asian, 0.02% Pacific Islander, 0.20% from other races, and 0.67% from two or more races. 0.80% of the population were Hispanic or Latino of any race. 31.4% were of German, 18.6% Norwegian, 11.3% Swedish, 5.5% Irish and 5.3% American ancestry.

There were 16,254 households, out of which 32.10% had children under the age of 18 living with them, 58.20% were married couples living together, 7.40% had a female householder with no husband present, and 30.30% were non-families. 25.20% of all households were made up of individuals, and 10.60% had someone living alone who was 65 years of age or older. The average household size was 2.51 and the average family size was 3.01.

In the county, the population was spread out, with 26.20% under the age of 18, 6.70% from 18 to 24, 27.70% from 25 to 44, 24.30% from 45 to 64, and 15.10% who were 65 years of age or older. The median age was 39 years. For every 100 females there were 99.90 males. For every 100 females age 18 and over, there were 98.50 males.

=== 2017 fertility ===
In 2017, there were 400 births, giving a general fertility rate of 56.0 births per 1000 women aged 15–44, the 14th lowest rate out of all 72 Wisconsin counties.

== Education ==
- Amery School District
- Clayton School District
- Clear Lake School District
- Frederic School District
- Luck School District
- Osceola School District
- St. Croix Falls School District
- Unity School District

== Communities ==
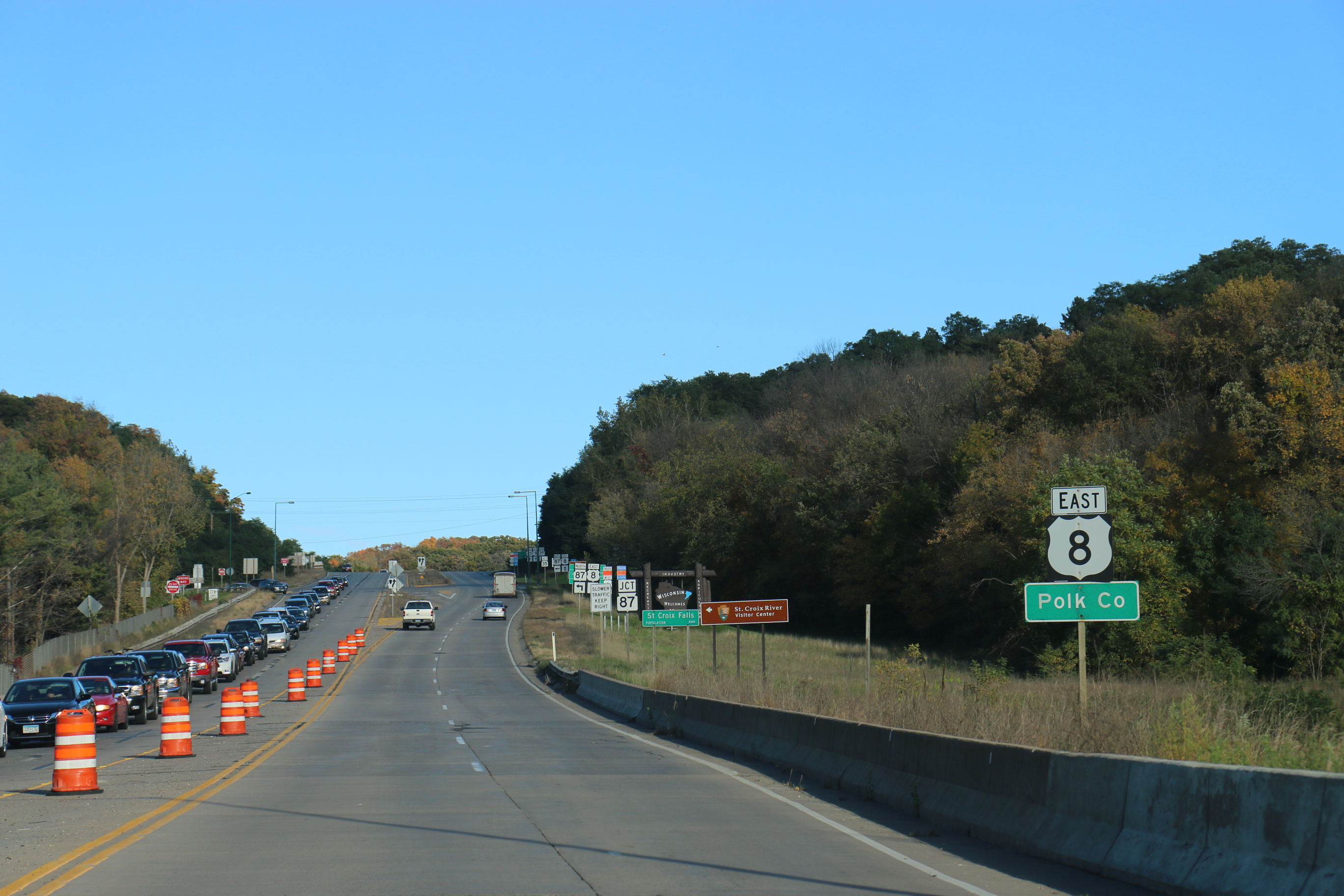
The sign for Polk County while entering Wisconsin on US8

=== Cities ===
- Amery
- St. Croix Falls

=== Villages ===
- Balsam Lake (county seat)
- Centuria
- Clayton
- Clear Lake
- Dresser
- Frederic
- Luck
- Milltown
- Osceola
- Turtle Lake (mostly in Barron County)

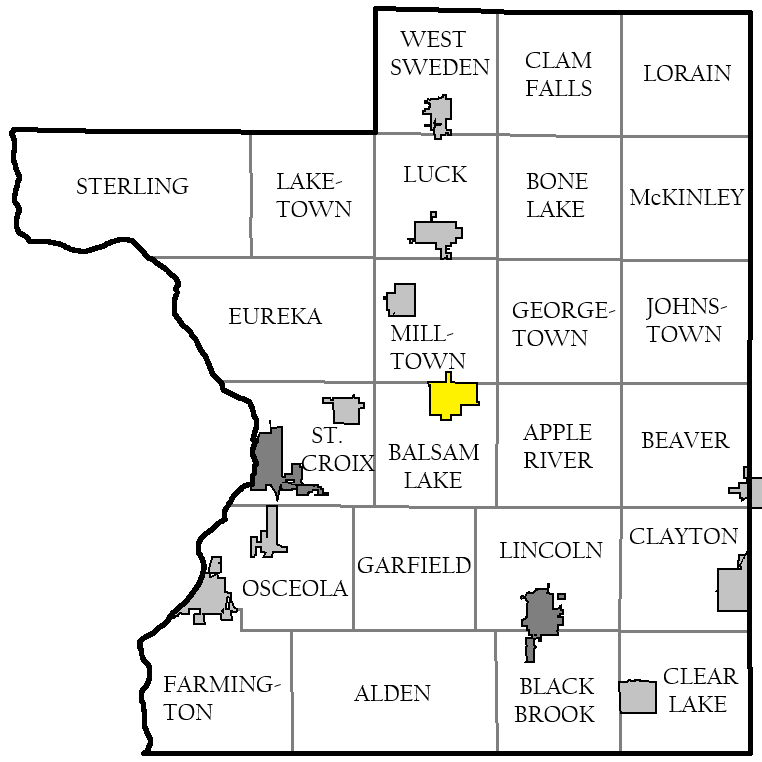
Towns of Polk County

=== Towns ===
- Alden
- Apple River
- Balsam Lake
- Beaver
- Black Brook
- Bone Lake
- Clam Falls
- Clayton
- Clear Lake
- Eureka
- Farmington
- Garfield
- Georgetown
- Johnstown
- Laketown
- Lincoln
- Lorain
- Luck
- McKinley
- Milltown
- Osceola
- St. Croix Falls
- Sterling
- West Sweden

=== Census-designated place ===
- Lewis

=== Unincorporated communities ===
- Atlas
- Bunyan
- Clam Falls
- Cushing
- Deronda
- East Farmington
- Eureka Center
- Fox Creek
- Horse Creek
- Indian Creek
- Joel
- Lamar
- Little Falls
- Lykens
- McKinley
- Nye
- Pole Cat Crossing (partial)
- Range
- Richardson
- Sand Lake
- Ubet
- Wanderoos
- West Denmark
- West Sweden
- Wolf Creek

== Notable residents ==
- Arnold Franz Brasz (1888–1966), a prominent painter, sculptor, and printmaker was born in Polk County on July 19, 1888
- Dougald D. Kennedy (1879–1941) member of the Wisconsin Progressive Party and Wisconsin State Assembly. Represented Polk County from the 63rd Wisconsin Legislature to the 65th Wisconsin Legislature.
- George A. Nelson (1873–1962), the 1936 Socialist Party of America nominee for vice president of the United States, was born in rural Polk County and was a dairy farmer there.

== Politics ==
From its founding in 1853 through 1928, Polk County was a strongly Republican county in presidential elections, never once backing the Democratic candidate. The only two times in that span it did not support the Republican candidate were in 1912 when former Republican Theodore Roosevelt won the county as the Progressive candidate and in 1924 when Progressive and native Wisconsinite Robert M. La Follette won the county. Then, between 1932 and 2012, Polk County was a very consistently competitive county that leaned slightly Republican. During the 1930s and 1940s at the state level Polk county was a stronghold for the Wisconsin Progressive Party–National Progressives. voting consistently for Philip La Follette during gubernatorial elections and Robert M. La Follette Jr. for senate.

Only two presidential candidates between 1932 and 2012, won at least 60% of the county's vote, Dwight D. Eisenhower in his 1952 landslide and Lyndon B. Johnson in his 1964 landslide. In 2016, Donald Trump won over 60% of the county's vote with a winning margin of over 27%, the best margin of victory in the county since 1928 with the exception of Johnson in 1964. Trump won in 2020 with the exact same margin of victory of over 27% while increasing his vote share to nearly 63%. In 2024, Trump once again improved on his previous performance, taking nearly 65% of Polk County's vote and defeating Kamala Harris by more than a 30% margin.

=== Election results ===
United States presidential election results for Polk County, Wisconsin
Year	Republican		Democratic		Third party(ies)	
Year	No.	%	No.	%	No.	%
1892	1,477	60.33%	585	23.90%	386	15.77%
1896	2,861	74.56%	891	23.22%	85	2.22%
1900	2,735	77.48%	694	19.66%	101	2.86%
1904	2,985	85.55%	296	8.48%	208	5.96%
1908	2,788	72.02%	816	21.08%	267	6.90%
1912	848	27.14%	830	26.56%	1,447	46.30%
1916	2,080	51.21%	1,713	42.17%	269	6.62%
1920	4,796	80.47%	752	12.62%	412	6.91%
1924	2,793	37.57%	317	4.26%	4,324	58.17%
1928	6,905	75.14%	2,177	23.69%	108	1.18%
1932	3,425	37.10%	5,421	58.72%	386	4.18%
1936	3,596	34.25%	5,618	53.51%	1,285	12.24%
1940	6,031	53.62%	4,979	44.27%	238	2.12%
1944	5,329	53.58%	4,489	45.14%	127	1.28%
1948	3,974	41.52%	5,330	55.68%	268	2.80%
1952	6,966	61.74%	4,274	37.88%	42	0.37%
1956	5,894	54.04%	4,985	45.71%	27	0.25%
1960	6,387	55.23%	5,148	44.51%	30	0.26%
1964	3,754	34.12%	7,215	65.57%	34	0.31%
1968	5,583	48.83%	5,179	45.30%	671	5.87%
1972	6,567	52.40%	5,738	45.78%	228	1.82%
1976	6,159	41.27%	8,485	56.85%	280	1.88%
1980	7,207	44.23%	7,607	46.68%	1,482	9.09%
1984	8,106	49.82%	8,034	49.38%	129	0.79%
1988	6,866	42.98%	8,981	56.22%	128	0.80%
1992	5,446	30.14%	7,746	42.86%	4,879	27.00%
1996	5,387	32.82%	8,334	50.78%	2,692	16.40%
2000	9,557	48.36%	8,961	45.34%	1,244	6.29%
2004	12,095	51.46%	11,173	47.54%	235	1.00%
2008	11,282	49.83%	10,876	48.03%	485	2.14%
2012	12,094	53.58%	10,073	44.62%	406	1.80%
2016	13,810	60.72%	7,565	33.26%	1,370	6.02%
2020	16,611	62.99%	9,370	35.53%	390	1.48%
2024	18,296	64.83%	9,567	33.90%	359	1.27%

== See also ==
- National Register of Historic Places listings in Polk County, Wisconsin
- St. Croix Chippewa Indians of Wisconsin
