= Sterling, Wisconsin =

Sterling, Wisconsin may refer to:

- Sterling, Polk County, Wisconsin, a town
- Sterling, Vernon County, Wisconsin, a town
