= Lykens =

Lykens can refer to:

== Places ==
United States

- Lykens, Ohio
- Lykens Township, Crawford County, Ohio
- The borough of Lykens, Pennsylvania
- Lykens Township, Pennsylvania
- Lykens, Wisconsin
