= Balsam Lake (town), Wisconsin =

Balsam Lake
- Town
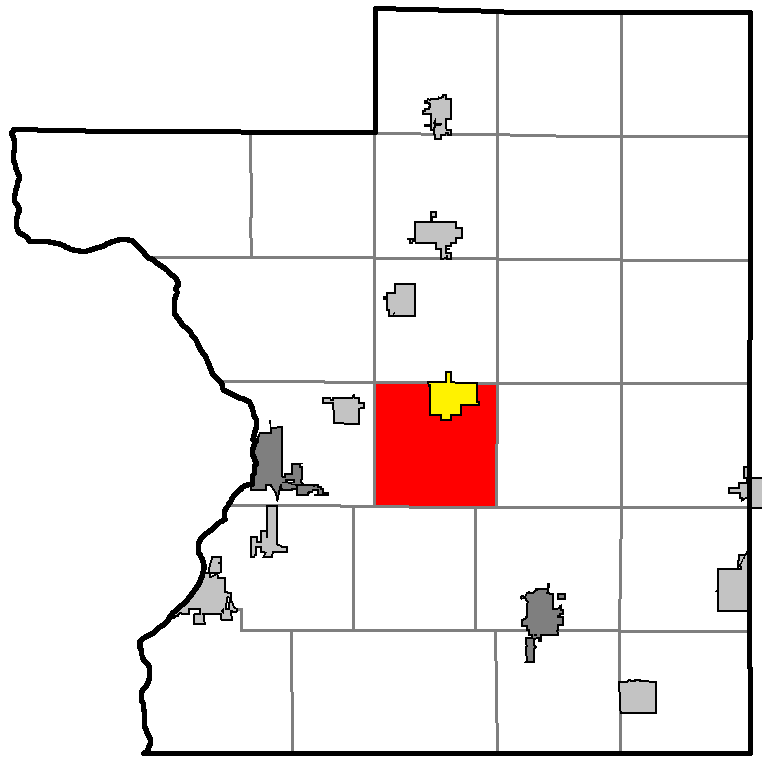
- Location of Balsam Lake, within Polk County

- Location within the state of Wisconsin
- Coordinates: 45°27′29″N 92°27′18″W
- Country: United States
- State: Wisconsin
- County: Polk

Area
  - Total: 32.2 sq mi (83.5 km^{2})
  - Land: 29.7 sq mi (77.0 km^{2})
  - Water: 2.5 sq mi (6.5 km^{2})

Population (2020)
  - Total: 1,416
  - Density: 47.6/sq mi (18.4/km^{2})
- Time zone: UTC-6 (Central (CST))
  - Summer (DST): UTC-5 (CDT)
- Area codes: 715 & 534

Balsam Lake is a town in Polk County, Wisconsin, United States. The population was 1,416 at the 2020 census. The Village of Balsam Lake is located within the town. The unincorporated community of Lykens is also located in the town.

== Geography ==
According to the United States Census Bureau, the town has a total area of 32.2 square miles (83.5 km^{2}), of which 29.7 square miles (77.0 km^{2}) is land and 2.5 square miles (6.5 km^{2}) (7.76%) is water.

== Demographics ==
As of the census of 2000, there were 1,384 people, 529 households, and 402 families residing in the town. The population density was 46.6 people per square mile (18.0/km^{2}). There were 1,018 housing units at an average density of 34.2 per square mile (13.2/km^{2}). The racial makeup of the town was 96.89% White, 0.29% Black or African American, 1.37% Native American, 0.72% Asian, 0.07% from other races, and 0.65% from two or more races. 0.58% of the population were Hispanic or Latino of any race.

There were 529 households, out of which 32.9% had children under the age of 18 living with them, 65.0% were married couples living together, 4.7% had a female householder with no husband present, and 24.0% were non-families. 19.1% of all households were made up of individuals, and 4.5% had someone living alone who was 65 years of age or older. The average household size was 2.61 and the average family size was 2.97.

In the town, the population was spread out, with 27.7% under the age of 18, 4.7% from 18 to 24, 29.0% from 25 to 44, 28.2% from 45 to 64, and 10.4% who were 65 years of age or older. The median age was 39 years. For every 100 females, there were 109.1 males. For every 100 females age 18 and over, there were 110.3 males.

The median income for a household in the town was $45,909, and the median income for a family was $51,319. Males had a median income of $36,759 versus $22,500 for females. The per capita income for the town was $22,248. About 6.0% of families and 9.0% of the population were below the poverty line, including 12.8% of those under age 18 and 9.1% of those age 65 or over.

== Education ==
- Unity School District
