= Eureka, Wisconsin =

Eureka, Wisconsin in the United States state of Wisconsin may refer to:

- Eureka, Polk County, Wisconsin, a town
- Eureka Center, Wisconsin, an unincorporated community within Eureka, Polk County, Wisconsin
- Eureka, Winnebago County, Wisconsin, an unincorporated community
