= Sand Lake, Wisconsin =

Sand Lake is the name of some places in the U.S. state of Wisconsin:

- Sand Lake, Burnett County, Wisconsin, a town
- Sand Lake, Sawyer County, Wisconsin, a town
- Sand Lake, Polk County, Wisconsin, an unincorporated community
