= Ubet =

Ubet may refer to:

- Ubet, Montana, a ghost town, United States
- Ubet, Wisconsin, an unincorporated community, United States
- Ubet (company), an Australian sports betting agency
- Fox's U-bet chocolate syrup, a brand of chocolate syrup
