= White Ash Lake =

- Location within Wisconsin
- Location: Polk County, Wisconsin
- Coordinates: 45.448°N 92.311°W
- Type: lake
- Surface area: 116 acres (0.47 km^{2})
- Max. depth: 9 feet (2.7 m)

White Ash Lake is located in Apple River, Polk County, Wisconsin. White Ash Lake is a 116 acres (0.47 km^{2}) lake, and has a maximum depth of 9 feet (2.7 m). The lake clarity is low. The fish found in White Ash Lake are panfish, largemouth bass and Northern Pike. Visitors can access the lake through public boat landings.

== Activities ==
Boaters are allowed to use their motorized boats on White Ash lake. Waterskiing and related activities (parasailing and aquaplane) are allowed from 10 AM to 6 PM.
