= St. Croix Falls (town), Wisconsin =

St. Croix Falls, Wisconsin
- Town
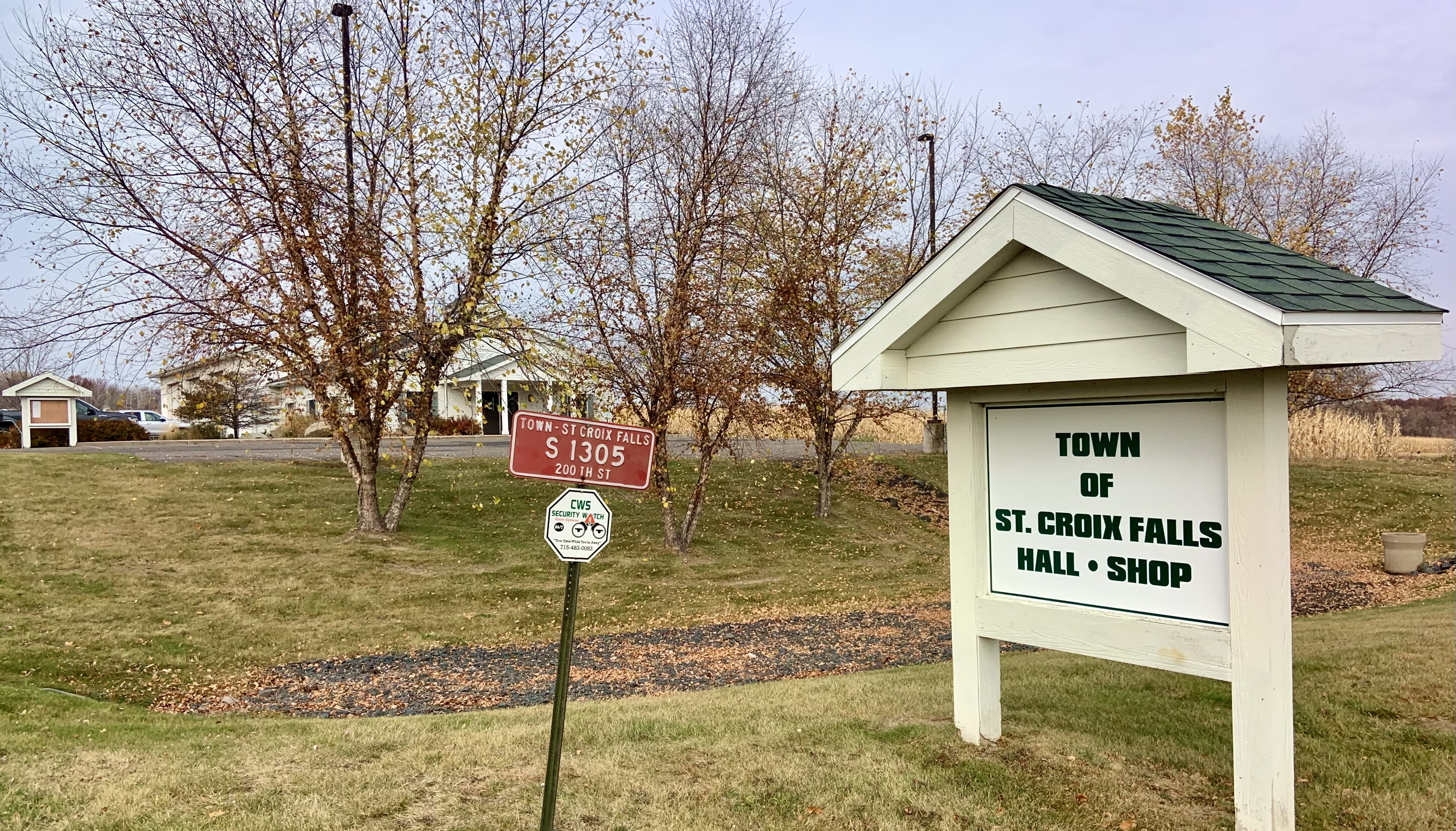
- Town hall

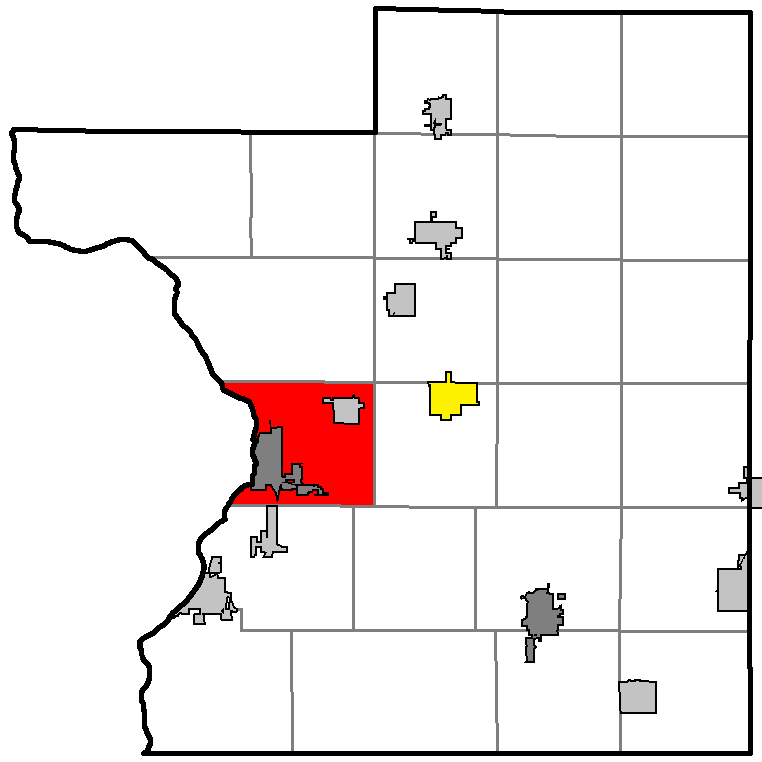
- Location of St. Croix Falls, within Polk County

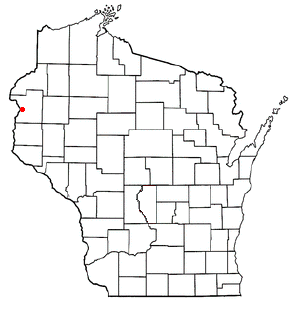
- Location of St. Croix Falls (town), Wisconsin
- Coordinates: 45°25′1″N 92°34′49″W
- Country: United States
- State: Wisconsin
- County: Polk

Area
  - Total: 31.9 sq mi (82.5 km^{2})
  - Land: 30.9 sq mi (80.1 km^{2})
  - Water: 0.93 sq mi (2.4 km^{2})
- Elevation: 1,178 ft (359 m)

Population (2020)
  - Total: 1,164
  - Density: 37.6/sq mi (14.5/km^{2})
- Time zone: UTC-6 (Central (CST))
  - Summer (DST): UTC-5 (CDT)
- Area codes: 715 & 534
- FIPS code: 55-70575
- GNIS feature ID: 1584086
- Website: https://townofstcroixfallswi.gov/

St. Croix Falls is a town in Polk County, Wisconsin, United States. The population was 1,164 at the 2020 census. The City of St. Croix Falls is located within the town. The unincorporated community of Lamar is located in the town.

== Geography ==
According to the United States Census Bureau, the town has a total area of 31.8 square miles (82.4 km^{2}), of which 30.9 square miles (80.1 km^{2}) is land and 0.9 square mile (2.4 km^{2}) (2.89%) is water.

== Demographics ==
As of the census of 2000, there were 1,119 people, 420 households, and 309 families residing in the town. The population density was 36.2 people per square mile (14.0/km^{2}). There were 538 housing units at an average density of 17.4 per square mile (6.7/km^{2}). The racial makeup of the town was 98.48% White, 0.09% Native American, 0.54% Asian, 0.18% from other races, and 0.71% from two or more races. 0.45% of the population were Hispanic or Latino of any race.

There were 420 households, out of which 36.0% had children under the age of 18 living with them, 63.6% were married couples living together, 5.7% had a female householder with no husband present, and 26.4% were non-families. 21.4% of all households were made up of individuals, and 6.7% had someone living alone who was 65 years of age or older. The average household size was 2.66 and the average family size was 3.11.

In the town, the population was spread out, with 26.5% under the age of 18, 6.7% from 18 to 24, 29.1% from 25 to 44, 25.5% from 45 to 64, and 12.2% who were 65 years of age or older. The median age was 39 years. For every 100 females, there were 115.6 males. For every 100 females age 18 and over, there were 112.7 males.

The median income for a household in the town was $46,500, and the median income for a family was $52,188. Males had a median income of $37,639 versus $23,864 for females. The per capita income for the town was $18,760. About 5.8% of families and 8.9% of the population were below the poverty line, including 11.4% of those under age 18 and 11.9% of those age 65 or over.

== Education ==
- St. Croix Falls School District
- Unity School District
