= Apple River, Wisconsin =

Town of Apple River
- Town
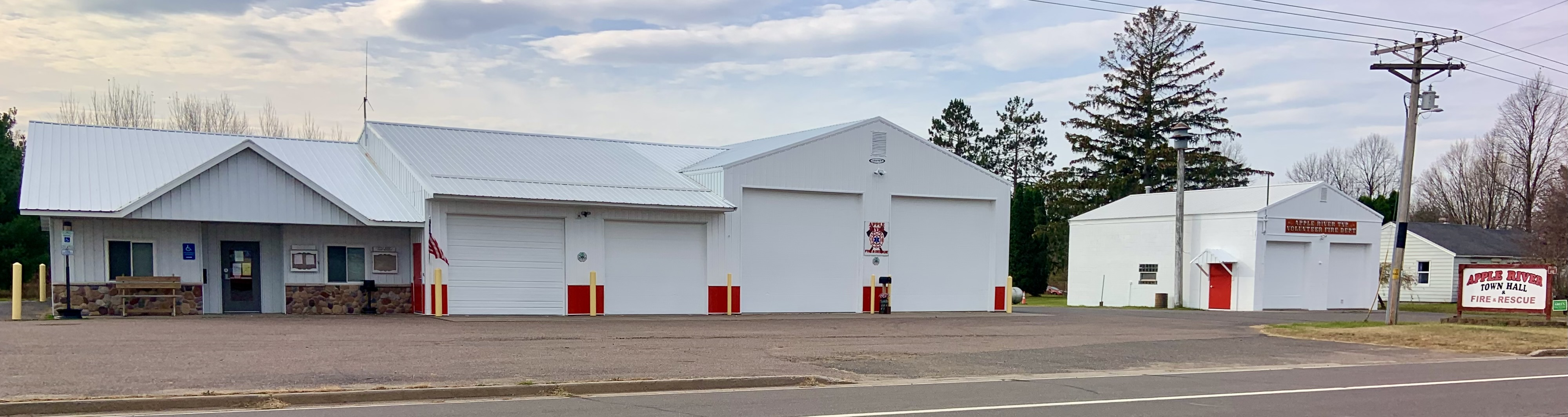
- Town hall

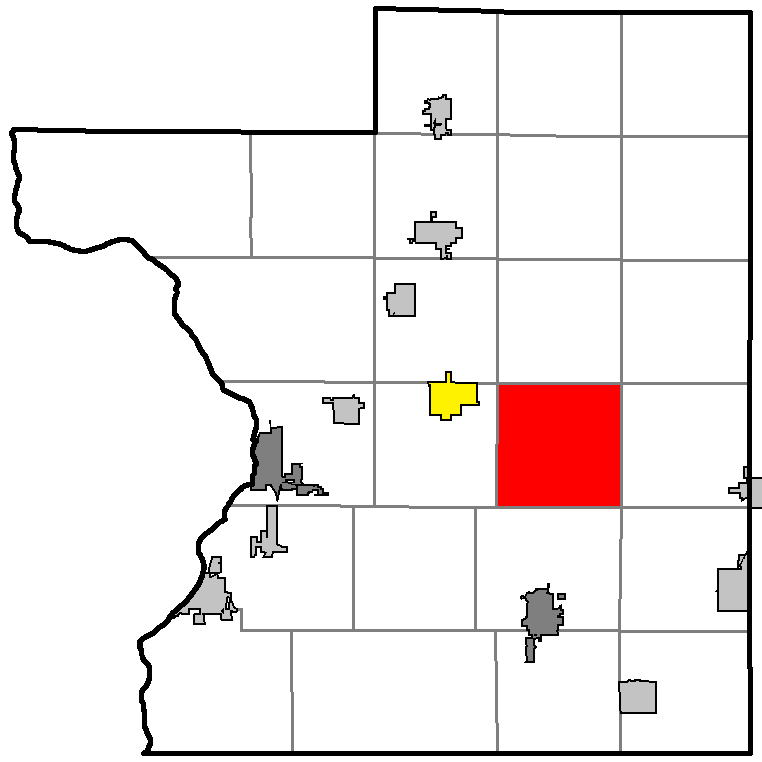
- Location of Apple River, within Polk County

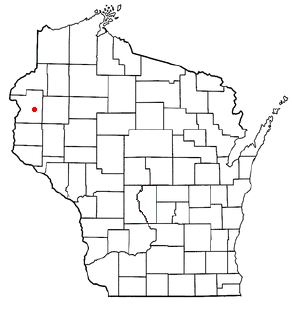
- Location of Town of Apple River
- Coordinates: 45°26′23″N 92°20′4″W
- Country: United States
- State: Wisconsin
- County: Polk

Area
  - Total: 36.0 sq mi (93.3 km^{2})
  - Land: 34.0 sq mi (88.0 km^{2})
  - Water: 2.0 sq mi (5.2 km^{2})
- Elevation: 1,217 ft (371 m)

Population (2020)
  - Total: 1,173
  - Density: 34.5/sq mi (13.3/km^{2})
- Time zone: UTC-6 (Central (CST))
  - Summer (DST): UTC-5 (CDT)
- Area codes: 715 & 534
- FIPS code: 55-02350
- GNIS feature ID: 1582702

The Town of Apple River is located in Polk County, Wisconsin, United States. The population was 1,173 at the 2020 census. The unincorporated community of Range is located partially in the town.

== Geography ==
According to the United States Census Bureau, the town has a total area of 36.0 square miles (93 km^{2}), of which 34.0 square miles (88 km^{2}) is land and 2.0 square miles (5.2 km^{2}) (5.61%) is water. White Ash Lake is located in the town.

== Demographics ==
As of the census of 2000, there were 1,067 people, 418 households, and 310 families residing in the town. The population density was 31.4 people per square mile (12.1 people/km^{2}). There were 625 housing units at an average density of 18.4 per square mile (7.1/km^{2}). The racial makeup of the town was 97.84% White, 0.28% African American, 1.31% Native American, and 0.56% from two or more races. Hispanic or Latino of any race were 1.31% of the population.

There were 418 households, out of which 33.0% had children under the age of 18 living with them, 62.4% were married couples living together, 6.9% had a female householder with no husband present, and 25.8% were non-families. 19.6% of all households were made up of individuals, and 5.0% had someone living alone who was 65 years of age or older. The average household size was 2.55 and the average family size was 2.93.

In the town, the population was spread out, with 26.1% under the age of 18, 5.3% from 18 to 24, 28.6% from 25 to 44, 28.2% from 45 to 64, and 11.7% who were 65 years of age or older. The median age was 39 years. For every 100 females, there were 108.0 males. For every 100 females age 18 and over, there were 105.2 males.

The median income for a household in the town was $43,500, and the median income for a family was $45,781. Males had a median income of $37,596 versus $21,875 for females. The per capita income for the town was $19,331. About 5.6% of families and 7.4% of the population were below the poverty line, including 10.4% of those under age 18 and 3.1% of those age 65 or over.

== Education ==
- Unity School District
- Amery School District
