= Alden, Wisconsin =

- Town
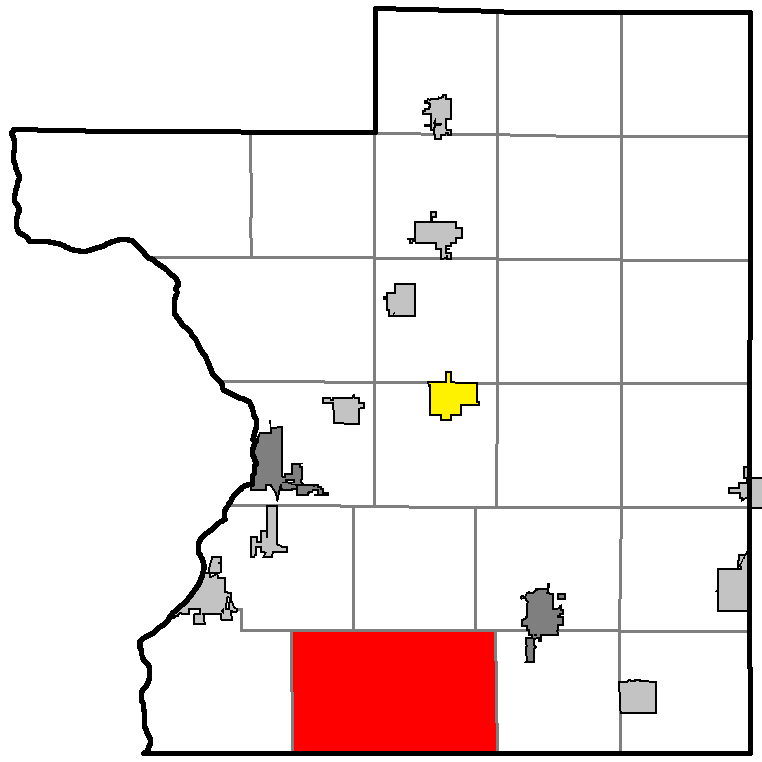
- Location of Alden, within Polk County

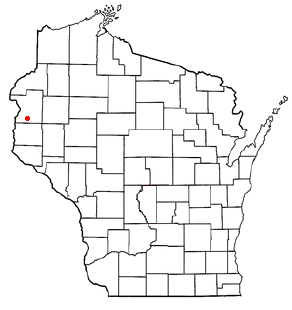
- Location of Alden, Wisconsin
- Coordinates: 45°15′51″N 92°30′44″W
- Country: United States
- State: Wisconsin
- County: Polk

Area
  - Total: 59.0 sq mi (152.9 km^{2})
  - Land: 56.1 sq mi (145.2 km^{2})
  - Water: 3.0 sq mi (7.7 km^{2})
- Elevation: 958 ft (292 m)

Population (2020)
  - Total: 2,918
  - Density: 52.05/sq mi (20.10/km^{2})
- Time zone: UTC-6 (Central (CST))
  - Summer (DST): UTC-5 (CDT)
- Area codes: 715 & 534
- FIPS code: 55-00950
- GNIS feature ID: 1582671
- Website: https://townofaldenwi.gov/

Alden is a town in Polk County, Wisconsin, United States. The population was 2,918 at the 2020 Census. The unincorporated community of Little Falls is located in the town.

== Geography ==
According to the United States Census Bureau, the town has a total area of 59.0 square miles (152.9 km^{2}), of which 56.1 square miles (145.2 km^{2}) is land and 3.0 square miles (7.7 km^{2}) (5.05%) is water.

== Transportation ==
Wisconsin State Highway 65 passes through Alden.

== Demographics ==
As of the census of 2000, there were 2,615 people, 973 households, and 751 families residing in the town. The population density was 46.6 people per square mile (18.0/km^{2}). There were 1,235 housing units at an average density of 22.0 per square mile (8.5/km^{2}). The racial makeup of the town was 98.66% White, 0.08% African American, 0.31% Native American, 0.15% Asian, 0.34% from other races, and 0.46% from two or more races. Hispanic or Latino people of any race were 0.65% of the population.

There were 973 households, out of which 33.5% had children under the age of 18 living with them, 66.4% were married couples living together, 5.7% had a female householder with no husband present, and 22.8% were non-families. 17.9% of all households were made up of individuals, and 4.6% had someone living alone who was 65 years of age or older. The average household size was 2.69 and the average family size was 3.05.

In the town, the population was spread out, with 27.0% under the age of 18, 6.3% from 18 to 24, 30.4% from 25 to 44, 27.5% from 45 to 64, and 8.8% who were 65 years of age or older. The median age was 38 years. For every 100 females, there were 107.9 males. For every 100 females age 18 and over, there were 113.2 males.

The median income for a household in the town was $57,337, and the median income for a family was $60,913. Males had a median income of $43,056 versus $25,823 for females. The per capita income for the town was $22,470. About 2.3% of families and 3.4% of the population were below the poverty line, including 2.4% of those under age 18 and 11.5% of those age 65 or over.
