= Milltown, Wisconsin =

- Village
- Location of Milltown in Polk County, Wisconsin.
- Coordinates: 45°29′35″N 92°27′48″W
- Country: United States
- State: Wisconsin
- County: Polk

Area
  - Total: 1.84 sq mi (4.76 km^{2})
  - Land: 1.81 sq mi (4.69 km^{2})
  - Water: 0.027 sq mi (0.07 km^{2})
- Elevation: 1,198 ft (365 m)

Population (2020)
  - Total: 948
  - Density: 524/sq mi (202/km^{2})
- Time zone: UTC-6 (Central (CST))
  - Summer (DST): UTC-5 (CDT)
- Area codes: 715 & 534
- FIPS code: 55-52100
- GNIS feature ID: 1569527
- Website: milltownvillage.com

Milltown is a village in Polk County, Wisconsin, United States. The population was 948 at the 2020 census. The village is located within the Town of Milltown.

== Geography ==
Milltown is located at 45°31′39″N 92°30′19″W (45.527684, -92.505386).

According to the United States Census Bureau, the village has a total area of 1.78 square miles (4.61 km^{2}), of which 1.75 square miles (4.53 km^{2}) is land and 0.03 square miles (0.08 km^{2}) is water.

Milltown is along Wisconsin Highways 35 and 46, and Polk County Road G.

== Demographics ==
Historical population
Census	Pop.	Note	%±
1910	250		—
1920	440		76.0%
1930	450		2.3%
1940	469		4.2%
1950	580		23.7%
1960	608		4.8%
1970	634		4.3%
1980	732		15.5%
1990	786		7.4%
2000	888		13.0%
2010	917		3.3%
2020	948		3.4%
U.S. Decennial Census

=== 2010 census ===
As of the census of 2010, there were 917 people, 416 households, and 237 families living in the village. The population density was 524.0 inhabitants per square mile (202.3/km^{2}). There were 473 housing units at an average density of 270.3 per square mile (104.4/km^{2}). The racial makeup of the village was 97.4% White, 0.3% African American, 0.9% Native American, 0.5% from other races, and 0.9% from two or more races. Hispanic or Latino of any race were 1.2% of the population.

There were 416 households, of which 31.0% had children under the age of 18 living with them, 36.3% were married couples living together, 13.0% had a female householder with no husband present, 7.7% had a male householder with no wife present, and 43.0% were non-families. 36.3% of all households were made up of individuals, and 15.4% had someone living alone who was 65 years of age or older. The average household size was 2.19 and the average family size was 2.79.

The median age in the village was 39.6 years. 24.4% of residents were under the age of 18; 6.5% were between the ages of 18 and 24; 25.6% were from 25 to 44; 27.5% were from 45 to 64; and 16% were 65 years of age or older. The gender makeup of the village was 50.1% male and 49.9% female.

=== 2000 census ===
As of the census of 2000, there were 888 people, 420 households, and 235 families living in the village. The population density was 501.8 people per square mile (193.7/km^{2}). There were 437 housing units at an average density of 246.9 per square mile (95.3/km^{2}). The racial makeup of the village was 97.18% White, 1.13% Native American, 0.68% from other races, and 1.01% from two or more races. 0.79% of the population were Hispanic or Latino of any race.

There were 420 households, out of which 25.0% had children under the age of 18 living with them, 38.6% were married couples living together, 12.1% had a female householder with no husband present, and 44.0% were non-families. 38.6% of all households were made up of individuals, and 21.0% had someone living alone who was 65 years of age or older. The average household size was 2.11 and the average family size was 2.76.

In the village, the population was spread out, with 22.5% under the age of 18, 7.5% from 18 to 24, 27.3% from 25 to 44, 19.1% from 45 to 64, and 23.5% who were 65 years of age or older. The median age was 40 years. For every 100 females, there were 85.0 males. For every 100 females age 18 and over, there were 85.9 males.

The median income for a household in the village was $28,309, and the median income for a family was $36,875. Males had a median income of $30,446 versus $22,031 for females. The per capita income for the village was $17,284. About 5.2% of families and 11.5% of the population were below the poverty line, including 7.6% of those under age 18 and 15.3% of those age 65 or over.

== Education ==
- Unity School District

== Notable people ==
- George A. Nelson, Wisconsin State Representative and farmer, born in Milltown.
- Howard I. Nelson, Minnesota state legislator and businessman, born in Milltown.
- Raymond A. Peabody, Wisconsin State Representative and businessman, lived in Milltown; Peabody was a trustee and village president of Milltown.
