= Wolf Creek, Wisconsin =

- Unincorporated community
- Location within Wisconsin Location within the United States
- Coordinates: 45°33′22″N 92°43′22″W
- Country: United States
- State: Wisconsin
- County: Polk
- Elevation: 817 ft (249 m)
- Time zone: UTC-6 (Central (CST))
  - Summer (DST): UTC-5 (CDT)
- Area codes: 715 & 534
- GNIS feature ID: 1576928

Wolf Creek is an unincorporated community located in the town of Sterling, Polk County, Wisconsin, United States.

Wolf Creek is located along the River Road, approximately 12 miles north of St. Croix Falls. The community derives its name from the Wolf Creek, that flows through and joins the St. Croix River approximately .5 miles southwest of the community.

Wolf Creek was initially a trading post and then a stopping place on the River Road from the Falls of St Croix to the pineries to the north. It was the distance a team of oxen could travel in one day.

In the 1840s it remained a stopping place. In 1854, Dr. Samuel Deneen and William Trimmer and families settled the area, building a mill and hotel. In 1855, the Township of Sterling was organized and Wolf Creek became the post office and trading center.

Wolf Creek remained a quiet small town with a boom in the late 1880s with the construction of nearby Nevers Dam on the St Croix River. The logging era lasted until 1914.

At its peak, Wolf Creek had several stores, a bar, a community hall, a Methodist church, a public school, post office, blacksmith shop and other businesses including the water-powered flour and saw mill.
