= Indian Creek, Wisconsin =

- Unincorporated community
- Location within Wisconsin Location within the United States
- Coordinates: 45°42′19″N 92°12′27″W
- Country: United States
- State: Wisconsin
- County: Polk
- Elevation: 1,063 ft (324 m)
- Time zone: UTC-6 (Central (CST))
  - Summer (DST): UTC-5 (CDT)
- Postal code: 55045
- Area codes: 715 & 534
- GNIS feature ID: 1577656

Indian Creek is an unincorporated community located in the town of Lorain, Polk County, Wisconsin, United States. It derives its name from the small, intermittent creek located near the community.
