= Milltown (town), Wisconsin =

Town in Polk County, Wisconsin

Milltown, Wisconsin
- Town
- Town of Milltown
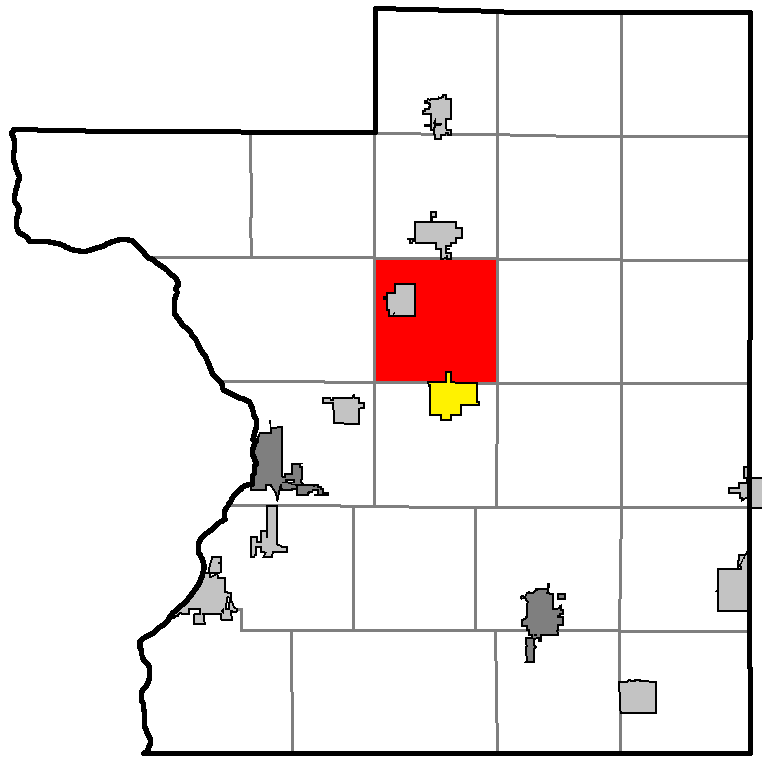
- Location of Milltown, within Polk County

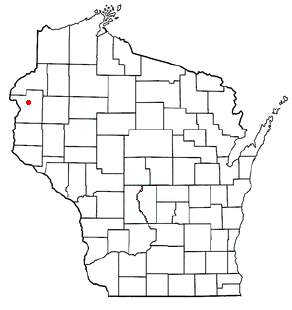
- Location of Milltown, Wisconsin
- Coordinates: 45°30′16″N 92°27′25″W
- Country: United States
- State: Wisconsin
- County: Polk

Area
  - Total: 33.21 sq mi (86.0 km^{2})
  - Land: 30.86 sq mi (79.9 km^{2})
  - Water: 2.35 sq mi (6.1 km^{2})

Population (2020)
  - Total: 1,219
  - Density: 39.50/sq mi (15.25/km^{2})
- Time zone: UTC-6 (Central (CST))
  - Summer (DST): UTC-5 (CDT)
- Area code(s): 715 and 534
- GNIS feature ID: 1583719

Milltown is a town in Polk County, Wisconsin, United States. The population was 1,219 at the 2020 census. The village of Milltown is located within the town.

== Geography ==
According to the United States Census Bureau, the town has a total area of 33.5 square miles (86.7 km^{2}), of which 31.2 square miles (80.9 km^{2}) is land and 2.2 square miles (5.8 km^{2}) (6.69%) is water.

== Demographics ==
As of the census of 2000, there were 1,146 people, 441 households, and 336 families residing in the town. The population density was 36.7 people per square mile (14.2/km^{2}). There were 811 housing units at an average density of 26.0 per square mile (10.0/km^{2}). The racial makeup of the town was 98.78% White, 0.26% Black or African American, 0.87% Native American, and 0.09% from two or more races. 0.44% of the population were Hispanic or Latino of any race.

There were 441 households, out of which 31.7% had children under the age of 18 living with them, 67.3% were married couples living together, 6.1% had a female householder with no husband present, and 23.8% were non-families. 17.9% of all households were made up of individuals, and 5.7% had someone living alone who was 65 years of age or older. The average household size was 2.60 and the average family size was 2.94.

In the town, the population was spread out, with 26.3% under the age of 18, 5.5% from 18 to 24, 25.7% from 25 to 44, 29.3% from 45 to 64, and 13.2% who were 65 years of age or older. The median age was 40 years. For every 100 females, there were 109.9 males. For every 100 females age 18 and over, there were 110.7 males.

The median income for a household in the town was $46,944, and the median income for a family was $52,946. Males had a median income of $36,912 versus $25,000 for females. The per capita income for the town was $19,991. About 2.7% of families and 4.1% of the population were below the poverty line, including 4.2% of those under age 18 and 7.1% of those age 65 or over.
