= Georgetown, Polk County, Wisconsin =

Georgetown, Wisconsin
- Town
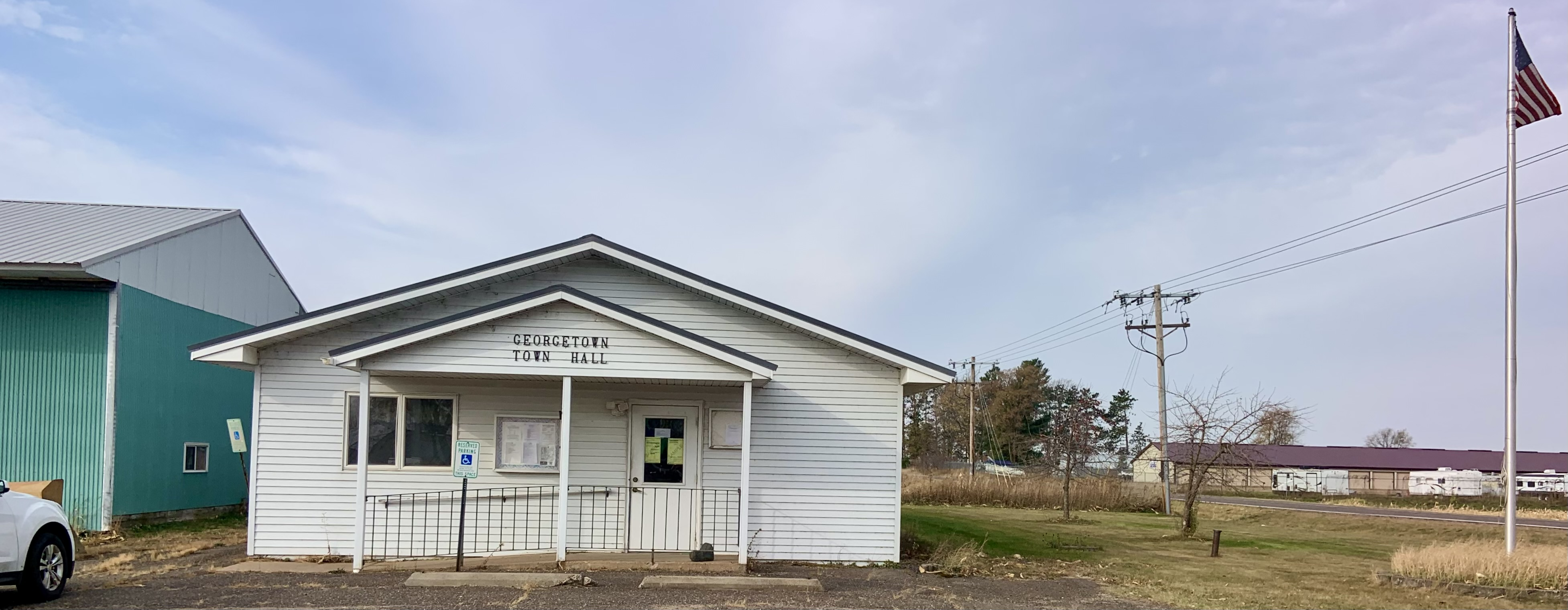
- Town hall

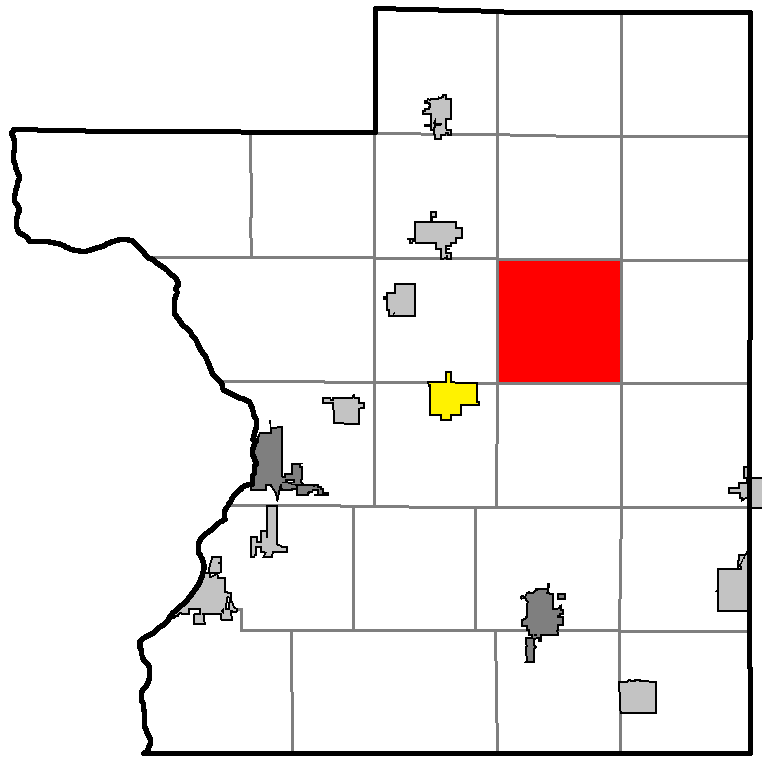
- Location of Georgetown, within Polk County

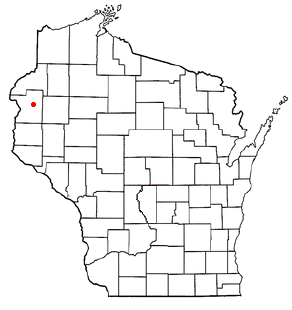
- Location of Georgetown, Polk County, Wisconsin
- Coordinates: 45°30′43″N 92°20′47″W
- Country: United States
- State: Wisconsin
- County: Polk

Area
  - Total: 35.2 sq mi (91.1 km^{2})
  - Land: 30.3 sq mi (78.6 km^{2})
  - Water: 4.8 sq mi (12.5 km^{2})
- Elevation: 1,178 ft (359 m)

Population (2020)
  - Total: 1,036
  - Density: 34.1/sq mi (13.2/km^{2})
- Time zone: UTC-6 (Central (CST))
  - Summer (DST): UTC-5 (CDT)
- Area codes: 715 & 534
- FIPS code: 55-28725
- GNIS feature ID: 1583265
- Website: https://townofgeorgetownwi.com/

Georgetown is a town in Polk County, Wisconsin, United States. The population was 1,036 at the 2020 census. The unincorporated communities of Bunyan and Fox Creek are located in the town.

== Geography ==
According to the United States Census Bureau, the town has a total area of 35.2 square miles (91.1 km^{2}), of which, 30.3 square miles (78.6 km^{2}) of it is land and 4.8 square miles (12.5 km^{2}) of it (13.71%) is water.

== Demographics ==
As of the census of 2010, there were 977 people, 433 households, and 299 families residing in the town. The U.S. Census Bureau projects Georgetown's population will be 1151 in 2010. The population density was 33.1 people per square mile (12.8/km^{2}). There were 1,274 housing units at an average density of 42.0 per square mile (16.2/km^{2}). The racial makeup of the town was 90.44% White, 9.06% Native American, 0.20% Asian, and 0.30% from two or more races. Hispanic or Latino of any race were 0.50% of the population.

There were 433 households, out of which 26.8% had children under the age of 18 living with them, 57.0% were married couples living together, 8.5% had a female householder with no husband present, and 30.9% were non-families. 27.3% of all households were made up of individuals, and 13.9% had someone living alone who was 65 years of age or older. The average household size was 2.32 and the average family size was 2.77.

In the town, the population was spread out, with 22.7% under the age of 18, 4.8% from 18 to 24, 21.2% from 25 to 44, 32.4% from 45 to 64, and 18.9% who were 65 years of age or older. The median age was 46 years. For every 100 females, there were 108.7 males. For every 100 females age 18 and over, there were 103.1 males.

The median income for a household in the town was $38,487, and the median income for a family was $44,722. Males had a median income of $37,063 versus $23,500 for females. The per capita income for the town was $21,558. About 4.5% of families and 9.3% of the population were below the poverty line, including 10.2% of those under age 18 and 6.5% of those age 65 or over.

== Education ==
- Unity School District
