= Beaver, Polk County, Wisconsin =

Beaver, Wisconsin
- Town
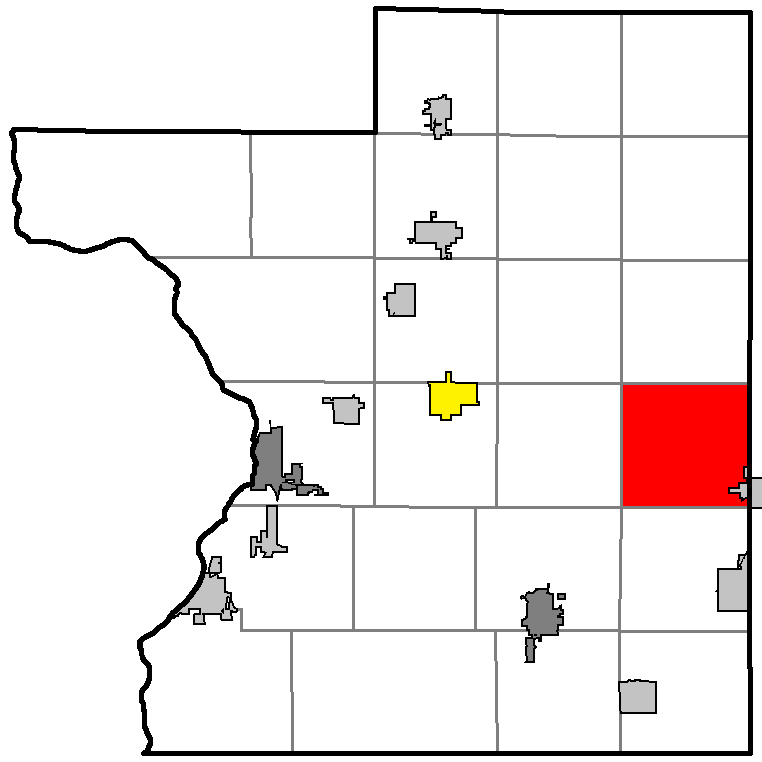
- Location of Beaver, within Polk County

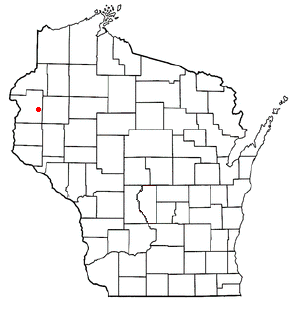
- Location of Beaver, Polk County, Wisconsin
- Coordinates: 45°24′53″N 92°13′3″W
- Country: United States
- State: Wisconsin
- County: Polk

Area
  - Total: 36.8 sq mi (95.3 km^{2})
  - Land: 35.3 sq mi (91.4 km^{2})
  - Water: 1.5 sq mi (3.9 km^{2})
- Elevation: 1,198 ft (365 m)

Population (2020)
  - Total: 798
  - Density: 22.6/sq mi (8.73/km^{2})
- Time zone: UTC-6 (Central (CST))
  - Summer (DST): UTC-5 (CDT)
- Area codes: 715 & 534
- FIPS code: 55-05825
- GNIS feature ID: 1582775

Beaver is a town in Polk County, Wisconsin, United States. The population was 798 at the 2020 census. The village of Turtle Lake and the unincorporated community of Range are located partially in the town.

== History ==
On November 11, 1885, the township of Beaver was established.

== Geography ==
According to the United States Census Bureau, the town has a total area of 36.8 square miles (95.3 km^{2}), of which 35.3 square miles (91.4 km^{2}) is land and 1.5 square miles (3.9 km^{2}) (4.10%) is water.

== Demographics ==
As of the census of 2000, there were 753 people, 304 households, and 217 families residing in the town. The population density was 21.3 people per square mile (8.2/km^{2}). There were 441 housing units at an average density of 12.5 per square mile (4.8/km^{2}). The racial makeup of the town was 97.21% White, 1.33% Native American, 0.13% Asian, 0.53% from other races, and 0.80% from two or more races. Hispanic or Latino of any race were 0.40% of the population.

There were 304 households, out of which 28.3% had children under the age of 18 living with them, 60.5% were married couples living together, 7.9% had a female householder with no husband present, and 28.3% were non-families. 23.7% of all households were made up of individuals, and 7.9% had someone living alone who was 65 years of age or older. The average household size was 2.48 and the average family size was 2.91.

In the town, the population was spread out, with 24.2% under the age of 18, 5.2% from 18 to 24, 27.1% from 25 to 44, 31.1% from 45 to 64, and 12.5% who were 65 years of age or older. The median age was 40 years. For every 100 females, there were 108.6 males. For every 100 females age 18 and over, there were 106.9 males.

The median income for a household in the town was $40,114, and the median income for a family was $45,000. Males had a median income of $36,932 versus $20,921 for females. The per capita income for the town was $18,242. About 4.9% of families and 7.1% of the population were below the poverty line, including 3.0% of those under age 18 and 19.1% of those age 65 or over.
