= Range, Wisconsin =

- Unincorporated community
- Location within Wisconsin Location within the United States
- Coordinates: 45°23′44″N 92°17′05″W
- Country: United States
- State: Wisconsin
- County: Polk
- Elevation: 1,168 ft (356 m)
- Time zone: UTC-6 (Central (CST))
  - Summer (DST): UTC-5 (CDT)
- Area codes: 715 & 534
- GNIS feature ID: 1572071

Range is an unincorporated community located in the towns of Apple River and Beaver, Polk County, Wisconsin, United States. It is situated along U.S. Highway 8 and County Road D, 60th Street.
