= Little Falls, Polk County, Wisconsin =

Little Falls, Wisconsin
- Unincorporated community
- Location within Wisconsin Location within the United States
- Coordinates: 45°16′26″N 92°25′08″W
- Country: United States
- State: Wisconsin
- County: Polk
- Elevation: 1,017 ft (310 m)
- Time zone: UTC-6 (Central (CST))
  - Summer (DST): UTC-5 (CDT)
- Area codes: 715 & 534
- GNIS feature ID: 1568259

Little Falls is an unincorporated community located in the town of Alden, Polk County, Wisconsin, United States. Little Falls is located at the junction of County Highways C and PP, 3.6 miles (5.8 km) southwest of Amery. The Apple River flows through Little Falls and was once dammed where County Road C now crosses the river.
