= Lamar, Wisconsin =

- Unincorporated community
- Location within Wisconsin Location within the United States
- Coordinates: 45°25′33″N 92°34′13″W
- Country: United States
- State: Wisconsin
- County: Polk
- Elevation: 1,217 ft (371 m)
- Time zone: UTC-6 (Central (CST))
  - Summer (DST): UTC-5 (CDT)
- Area codes: 715 & 534
- GNIS feature ID: 1577689

Lamar is an unincorporated community located in the town of St. Croix Falls, Polk County, Wisconsin, United States. The community is named for Lucius Quintus Cincinnatus Lamar II, an associate justice on the US Supreme Court and member of Congress.
