= Lorain, Wisconsin =

- Town
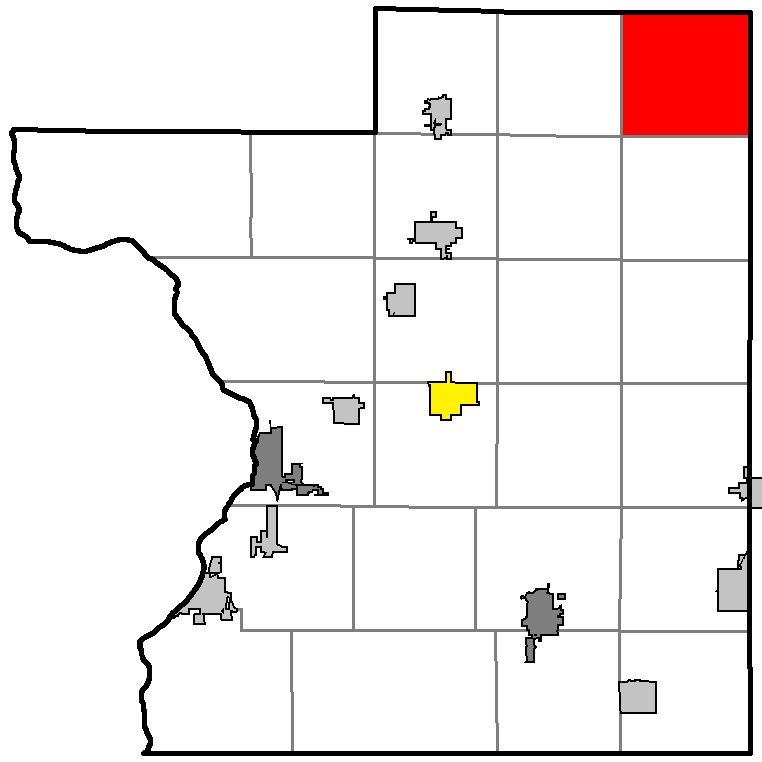
- Location of Lorain, within Polk County

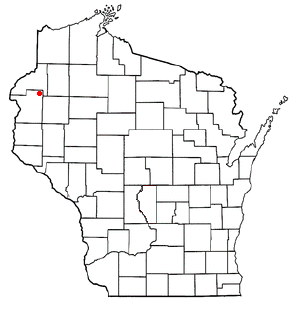
- Location of Lorain, Wisconsin
- Coordinates: 45°41′38″N 92°14′12″W
- Country: United States
- State: Wisconsin
- County: Polk

Area
  - Total: 37.0 sq mi (95.9 km^{2})
  - Land: 36.9 sq mi (95.5 km^{2})
  - Water: 0.12 sq mi (0.3 km^{2})
- Elevation: 1,120 ft (340 m)

Population (2020)
  - Total: 308
  - Density: 8.35/sq mi (3.23/km^{2})
- Time zone: UTC-6 (Central (CST))
  - Summer (DST): UTC-5 (CDT)
- Area codes: 715 & 534
- FIPS code: 55-45775
- GNIS feature ID: 1583599

Lorain is a town in Polk County, Wisconsin, United States. The population was 308 at the 2020 census. The unincorporated community of Indian Creek is located in the town.

== Geography ==
According to the United States Census Bureau, the town has a total area of 37.0 square miles (95.9 km^{2}), of which 36.9 square miles (95.5 km^{2}) is land and 0.1 square mile (0.3 km^{2}) (0.35%) is water.

== Demographics ==
At the 2000 census there were 328 people, 117 households, and 89 families in the town. The population density was 8.9 people per square mile (3.4/km^{2}). There were 173 housing units at an average density of 4.7 per square mile (1.8/km^{2}). The racial makeup of the town was 95.73% White, 2.13% Native American, and 2.13% from two or more races. Hispanic or Latino of any race were 1.83%.

Of the 117 households 31.6% had children under the age of 18 living with them, 66.7% were married couples living together, 3.4% had a female householder with no husband present, and 23.9% were non-families. 22.2% of households were one person and 8.5% were one person aged 65 or older. The average household size was 2.80 and the average family size was 3.26.

The age distribution was 29.3% under the age of 18, 6.7% from 18 to 24, 24.4% from 25 to 44, 24.4% from 45 to 64, and 15.2% 65 or older. The median age was 38 years. For every 100 females, there were 108.9 males. For every 100 females age 18 and over, there were 112.8 males.

The median household income was $25,208 and the median family income was $34,444. Males had a median income of $27,083 versus $15,833 for females. The per capita income for the town was $14,670. About 11.5% of families and 16.0% of the population were below the poverty line, including 25.8% of those under age 18 and 5.5% of those age 65 or over.
