= Polk County Courthouse (Wisconsin) =

- U.S. National Register of Historic Places
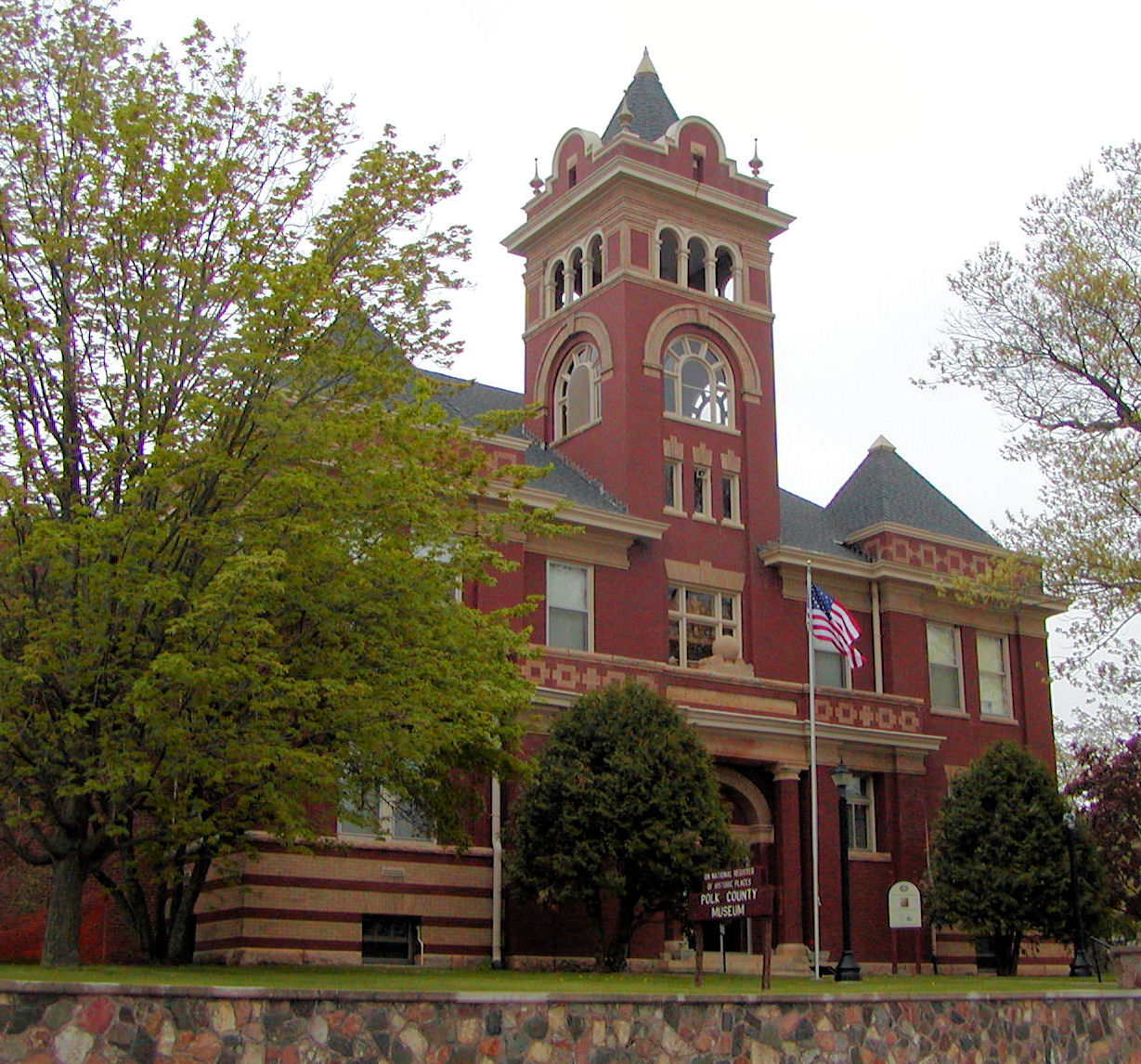
- Polk County Courthouse

- Location within Wisconsin Location within the United States
- Interactive map showing the location for Polk County Courthouse
- Location: Main St. Balsam Lake, Wisconsin
- Coordinates: 45.45216°N 92.45262°W
- Built: 1899
- Architect: Orff & Guilbert
- Architectural style: Richardsonian Romanesque
- NRHP reference No.: 82000697
- Added to NRHP: March 9, 1982

The Polk County Courthouse is located in Balsam Lake, Wisconsin. It was added to the National Register of Historic Places in 1982.

== Polk County Museum ==
The building served as a courthouse until 1975. It is now operated as the Polk County Museum by the Polk County Historical Society. The museum's exhibits include historic room displays, antique tools, farming equipment, toys and dolls, clothing, furniture, ceramic and glass ware items, household artifacts, and other exhibits about area history and culture.
