= Sterling, Polk County, Wisconsin =

Sterling, Wisconsin
- Town
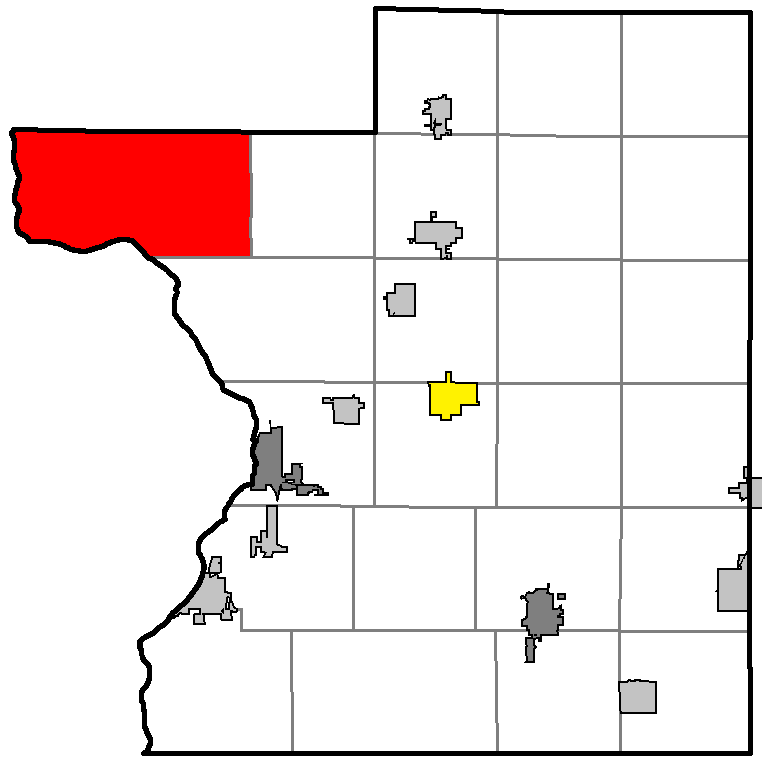
- Location of Sterling, within Polk County

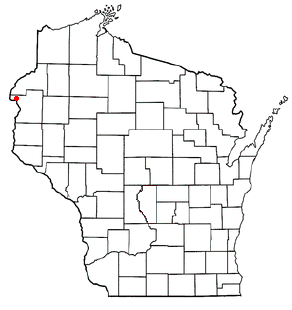
- Location of Sterling, Polk County, Wisconsin
- Coordinates: 45°36′15″N 92°44′40″W
- Country: United States
- State: Wisconsin
- County: Polk

Area
  - Total: 64.4 sq mi (166.9 km^{2})
  - Land: 63.4 sq mi (164.2 km^{2})
  - Water: 1.0 sq mi (2.7 km^{2})
- Elevation: 823 ft (251 m)

Population (2020)
  - Total: 724
  - Density: 11/sq mi (4.4/km^{2})
- Time zone: UTC-6 (Central (CST))
  - Summer (DST): UTC-5 (CDT)
- Area codes: 715 & 534
- FIPS code: 55-77050
- GNIS feature ID: 1584218
- Website: https://townofsterling.com/

Sterling is a town in Polk County, Wisconsin, United States. The population was 724 at the 2020 census. The unincorporated communities of Cushing and Wolf Creek are located partially in the town.

== Geography ==
According to the United States Census Bureau, the town has a total area of 64.4 square miles (166.9 km^{2}), of which 63.4 square miles (164.2 km^{2}) is land and 1.0 square miles (2.7 km^{2}) (1.60%) is water.

== Demographics ==
As of the census of 2000, there were 724 people, 280 households, and 201 families residing in the town. The population density was 11.4 people per square mile (4.4/km^{2}). There were 521 housing units at an average density of 8.2 per square mile (3.2/km^{2}). The racial makeup of the town was 97.93% White, 1.38% Asian, 0.14% from other races, and 0.55% from two or more races. Hispanic or Latino people of any race were 0.97% of the population.

There were 280 households, out of which 33.9% had children under the age of 18 living with them, 58.9% were married couples living together, 5.4% had a female householder with no husband present, and 27.9% were non-families. 21.8% of all households were made up of individuals, and 5.7% had someone living alone who was 65 years of age or older. The average household size was 2.59 and the average family size was 2.99.

In the town, the population was spread out, with 27.9% under the age of 18, 6.1% from 18 to 24, 31.8% from 25 to 44, 23.9% from 45 to 64, and 10.4% who were 65 years of age or older. The median age was 37 years. For every 100 females, there were 110.5 males. For every 100 females age 18 and over, there were 119.3 males.

The median income for a household in the town was $36,042, and the median income for a family was $38,125. Males had a median income of $31,071 versus $23,281 for females. The per capita income for the town was $15,428. About 5% of families and 8.2% of the population were below the poverty line, including 9.3% of those under age 18 and 2.3% of those age 65 or over.
