= Johnstown, Polk County, Wisconsin =

Johnstown, Wisconsin
- Town
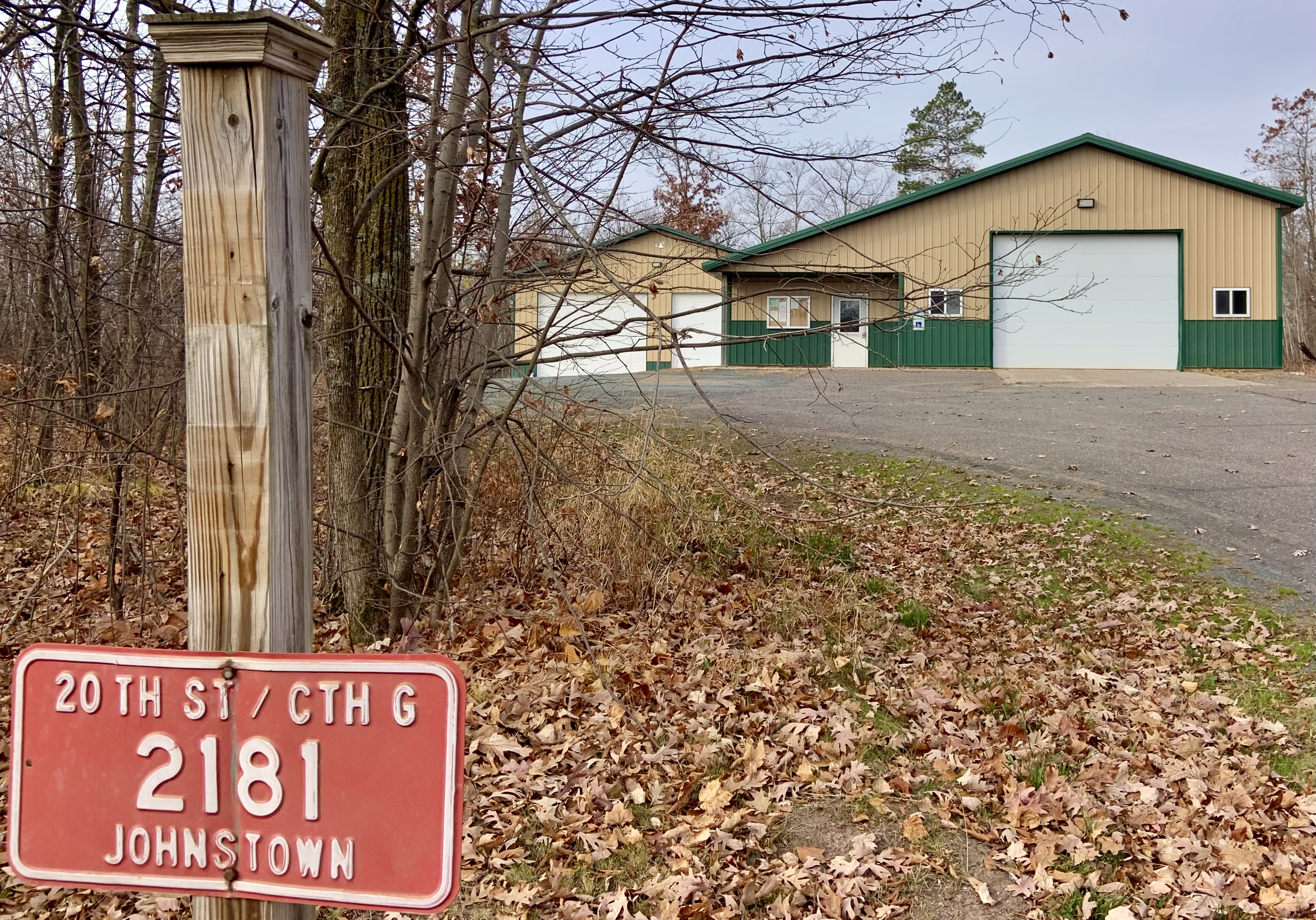
- Town hall

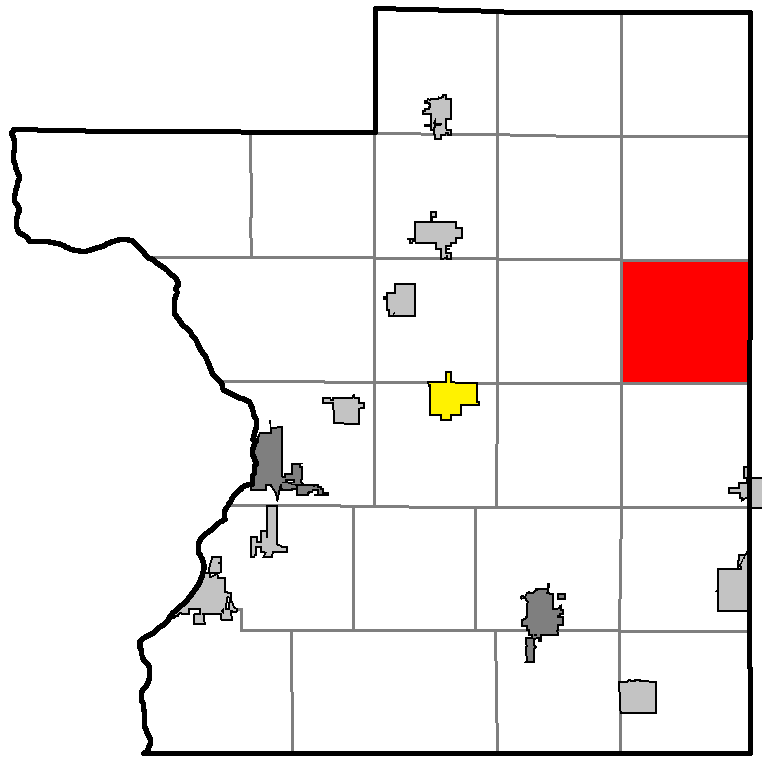
- Location of Johnstown, within Polk County

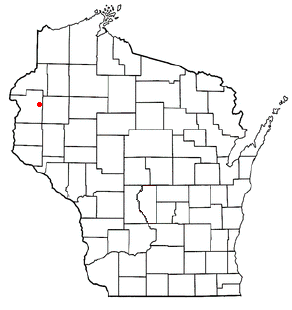
- Location of Johnstown, Polk County, Wisconsin
- Coordinates: 45°30′46″N 92°13′39″W
- Country: United States
- State: Wisconsin
- County: Polk

Area
  - Total: 37.1 sq mi (96.1 km^{2})
  - Land: 35.8 sq mi (92.6 km^{2})
  - Water: 1.4 sq mi (3.5 km^{2})
- Elevation: 1,253 ft (382 m)

Population (2020)
  - Total: 499
  - Density: 14.0/sq mi (5.39/km^{2})
- Time zone: UTC-6 (Central (CST))
  - Summer (DST): UTC-5 (CDT)
- Area codes: 715 & 534
- FIPS code: 55-38400
- GNIS feature ID: 1583457
- Website: https://townofjohnstownpowi.com/

Johnstown is a town in Polk County, Wisconsin, United States. The population was 499 at the 2020 census.

== Geography ==
According to the United States Census Bureau, the town has a total area of 37.1 square miles (96.1 km^{2}), of which 35.8 square miles (92.6 km^{2}) is land and 1.3 square miles (3.5 km^{2}) (3.61%) is water.

== Demographics ==
At the 2000 census there were 520 people in 203 households, including 154 families, in the town. The population density was 14.5 people per square mile (5.6/km^{2}). There were 418 housing units at an average density of 11.7 per square mile (4.5/km^{2}). The racial makeup of the town was 81.15% White, 18.27% Native American, 0.58% from two or more races. Hispanic or Latino of any race were 0.96%.

There were 203 households, out of which 29.1% had children under the age of 18 living with them, 57.1% were married couples living together, 11.8% had a female householder with no husband present, and 24.1% were non-families. 21.7% of households were one person, and 7.9% were one person aged 65 or older. The average household size was 2.56 and the average family size was 2.97.

The age distribution was 26.3% under the age of 18, 6.5% from 18 to 24, 21.7% from 25 to 44, 30.8% from 45 to 64, and 14.6% 65 or older. The median age was 42 years. For every 100 females, there were 109.7 males. For every 100 females age 18 and over, there were 111.6 males.

The median household income was $37,500 and the median family income was $38,750. Males had a median income of $33,000 versus $21,875 for females. The per capita income for the town was $17,368. 18.5% of the population and 14.7% of families were below the poverty line. Out of the total population, 22.3% of those under the age of 18 and 6.8% of those 65 and older were living below the poverty line.
