= Lykens, Wisconsin =

- Unincorporated community
- Location within Wisconsin Location within the United States
- Coordinates: 45°25′28″N 92°28′09″W
- Country: United States
- State: Wisconsin
- County: Polk
- Elevation: 1,089 ft (332 m)
- Time zone: UTC-6 (Central (CST))
  - Summer (DST): UTC-5 (CDT)
- Area codes: 715 & 534
- GNIS feature ID: 1577712

Lykens is an unincorporated community located in the town of Balsam Lake, Polk County, Wisconsin, United States. Lykens Lake is a 20 acre lake located in Polk County. It has a maximum depth of 10 feet.
