= Ubet, Wisconsin =

Ubet
- Unincorporated community
- Location within the state of Wisconsin
- Coordinates: 45°21′12″N 92°31′44″W
- Country: United States
- State: Wisconsin
- County: Polk
- City: Garfield
- Time zone: UTC-6 (Central (CST))
  - Summer (DST): UTC-5 (CDT)
- Area codes: 715 & 534

Ubet is an unincorporated community in the town of Garfield in Polk County, Wisconsin, United States.

Ubet has been noted for its unusual place name.
