= Balsam Lake, Wisconsin =

- Village
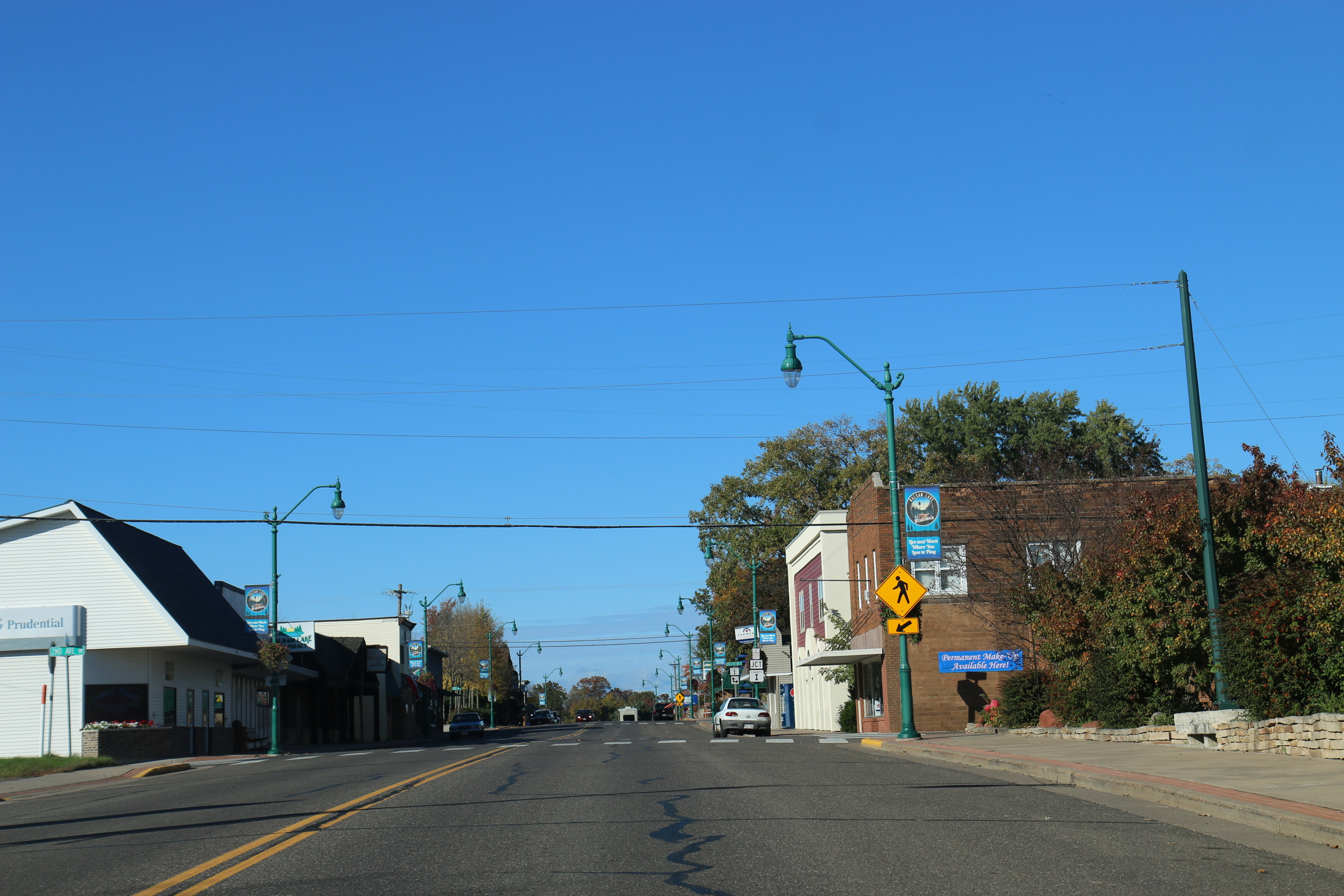
- Downtown Balsam Lake

- Location of Balsam Lake in Polk County, Wisconsin
- Coordinates: 45.4506814°N 92.4548533°W
- Country: United States
- State: Wisconsin
- County: Polk

Area
  - Total: 3.41 sq mi (8.83 km^{2})
  - Land: 2.17 sq mi (5.61 km^{2})
  - Water: 1.24 sq mi (3.21 km^{2})
- Elevation: 1,089 ft (332 m)

Population (2020)
  - Total: 934
  - Density: 431/sq mi (166/km^{2})
- Time zone: UTC-6 (Central (CST))
  - Summer (DST): UTC-5 (CDT)
- ZIP Code: 54810
- Area codes: 715 & 534
- FIPS code: 55-04475
- GNIS feature ID: 1582745
- Website: balsamlakevillage.com

Balsam Lake is a village in, and the county seat of Polk County, Wisconsin, United States. The population was 934 at the 2020 census. The village is located within the Town of Balsam Lake.

== History ==
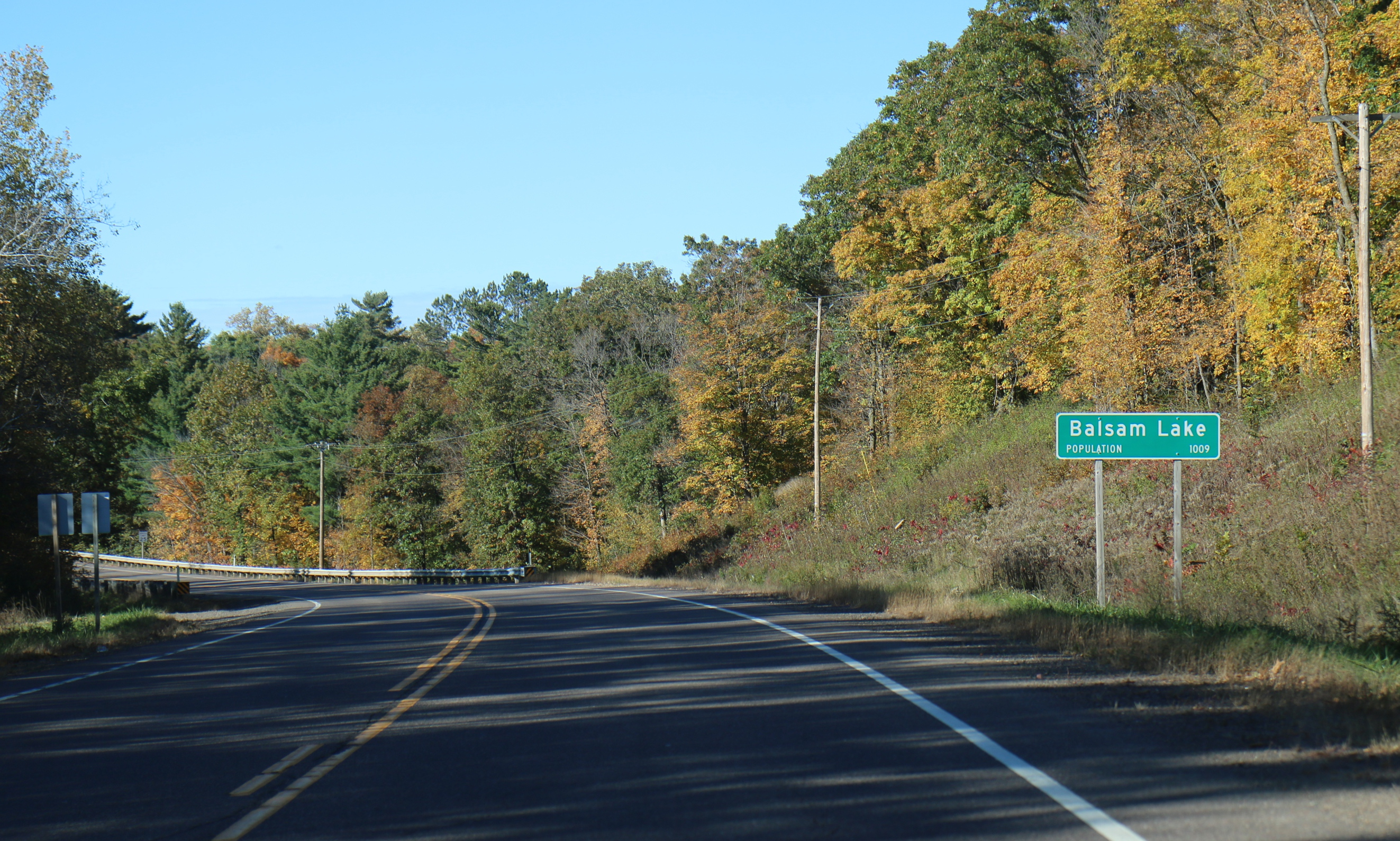
The sign for Balsam Lake on WIS46

The area in and around Balsam Lake was originally inhabited by a large band of Chippewa Indians. They referred to the area as "Innenehinduc," which means "place of the evergreen." This may have been due to the large amount of Canadian Yew, an evergreen shrub, which grew in abundance there.

The town was organized on January 8, 1870, and was named after the lake that lay within its borders. The first businesses included a blacksmith shop, a bank, a creamery, two sawmills, a hardware store, and a general store. Governmental buildings included a courthouse and a log schoolhouse.

Today, Balsam Lake is the home of the Polk County Government Center.

The town celebrates its history, and the history of the United States, with its annual Freedom Festival, which takes place on the Thursday through Sunday surrounding the Fourth of July.

== Geography ==
Balsam Lake is located at 45°27′28″N 92°27′17″W (45.45805, -92.454872).

According to the United States Census Bureau, the village has a total area of 3.39 square miles (8.78 km^{2}), of which 2.16 square miles (5.59 km^{2}) is land and 1.23 square miles (3.19 km^{2}) is water.

Wisconsin Highway 46 and Polk County Road I are main routes in the community. U.S. Highway 8 and Wisconsin Highway 65 pass nearby.

== Demographics ==
Historical population
| Census | Pop. | Note | %± |
|---|---|---|---|
| 1910 | 279 | | — |
| 1920 | 251 | | −10.0% |
| 1930 | 315 | | 25.5% |
| 1940 | 452 | | 43.5% |
| 1950 | 488 | | 8.0% |
| 1960 | 541 | | 10.9% |
| 1970 | 648 | | 19.8% |
| 1980 | 749 | | 15.6% |
| 1990 | 792 | | 5.7% |
| 2000 | 950 | | 19.9% |
| 2010 | 1,009 | | 6.2% |
| 2020 | 934 | | −7.4% |
U.S. Decennial Census

=== 2010 census ===
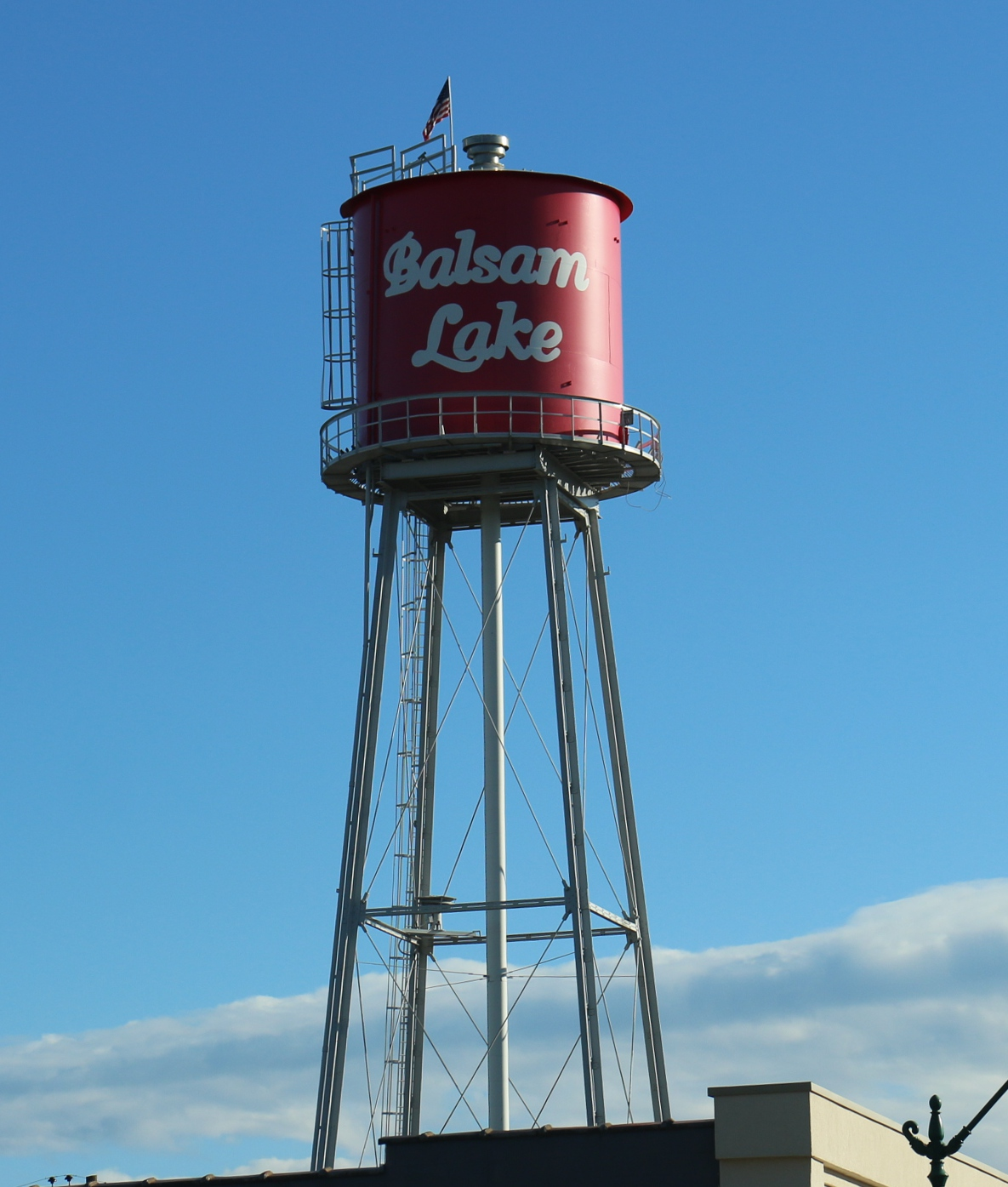
Water tower

As of the census of 2010, there were 1,009 people, 434 households, and 257 families living in the village. The population density was 467.1 inhabitants per square mile (180.3/km^{2}). There were 732 housing units at an average density of 338.9 per square mile (130.9/km^{2}). The racial makeup of the village was 94.2% White, 0.9% African American, 2.6% Native American, 0.3% Asian, 0.5% from other races, and 1.6% from two or more races. Hispanic or Latino of any race were 0.7% of the population.

There were 434 households, of which 22.8% had children under the age of 18 living with them, 43.8% were married couples living together, 9.2% had a female householder with no husband present, 6.2% had a male householder with no wife present, and 40.8% were non-families. 35.9% of all households were made up of individuals, and 17.3% had someone living alone who was 65 years of age or older. The average household size was 2.12 and the average family size was 2.66.

The median age in the village was 45 years. 17.4% of residents were under the age of 18; 9% were between the ages of 18 and 24; 23.7% were from 25 to 44; 28.6% were from 45 to 64; and 21.2% were 65 years of age or older. The gender makeup of the village was 51.5% male and 48.5% female.

=== 2000 census ===
As of the census of 2000, there were 950 people, 428 households, and 264 families living in the village. The population density was 469.1 people per square mile (180.7/km^{2}). There were 673 housing units at an average density of 332.3 per square mile (128.0/km^{2}). The racial makeup of the village was 96.00% White, 2.95% Native American, 0.21% Asian, 0.21% Pacific Islander, and 0.63% from two or more races. 0.42% of the population were Hispanic or Latino of any race.

There were 428 households, out of which 20.6% had children under the age of 18 living with them, 49.5% were married couples living together, 8.2% had a female householder with no husband present, and 38.1% were non-families. 32.7% of all households were made up of individuals, and 15.2% had someone living alone who was 65 years of age or older. The average household size was 2.10 and the average family size was 2.62.

In the village, the population was spread out, with 18.2% under the age of 18, 7.8% from 18 to 24, 23.2% from 25 to 44, 26.1% from 45 to 64, and 24.7% who were 65 years of age or older. The median age was 46 years. For every 100 females, there were 105.6 males. For every 100 females age 18 and over, there were 104.5 males.

The median income for a household in the village was $34,276, and the median income for a family was $42,708. Males had a median income of $31,397 versus $24,028 for females. The per capita income for the village was $19,576. About 4.8% of families and 7.7% of the population were below the poverty line, including 7.0% of those under age 18 and 10.4% of those age 65 or over.

== Education ==
- Unity School District

== Historic Sites ==
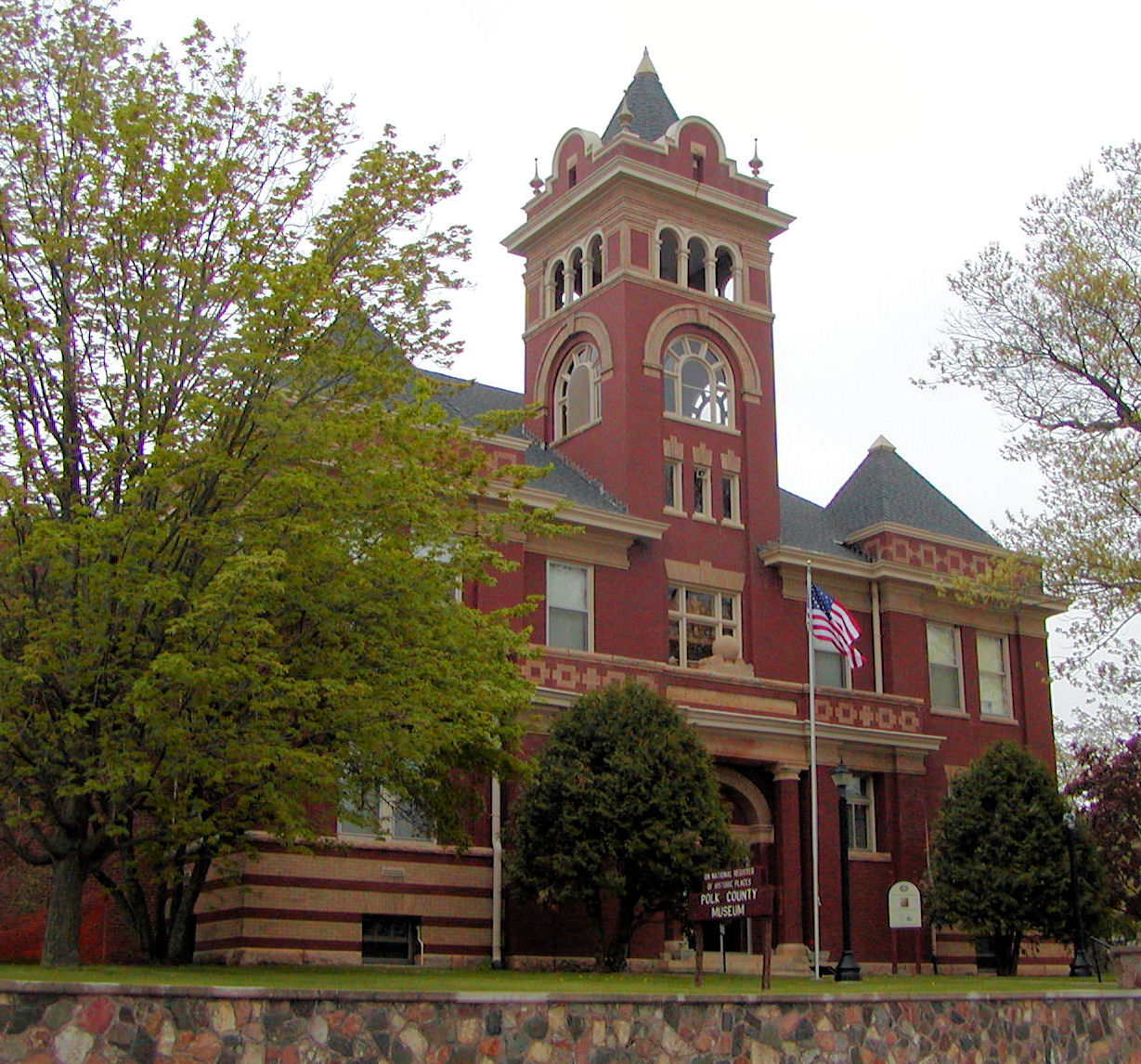
Polk County Courthouse

- Polk County Courthouse
