= Unity School District (Wisconsin) =

School district in Wisconsin, United States

Coordinates: 45°29′10″N 92°27′57″W

Location
- Balsam Lake, Wisconsin; USA

District information
- Type: Public School
- Motto: Expect Great Things!

Students and staff
- Students: 461 Elementary School (K-5) 268 Middle School (6-8) 372 High School (9-12)
- District mascot: Eagle
- Colors: Red, White and Blue

Other information
- Website: unity.k12.wi.us

Unity School District is a kindergarten through 12th grade school district located in between Balsam Lake, Wisconsin and Milltown, Wisconsin on Highway 46.

== Communities served by Unity School District ==
- Apple River, Wisconsin
- Balsam Lake, Wisconsin
- Centuria, Wisconsin
- Eureka, Wisconsin
- Georgetown, Wisconsin
- Johnstown, Wisconsin
- Laketown, Wisconsin
- Milltown, Wisconsin
- St. Croix Falls, Wisconsin
