= Eau Galle =

Eau Galle may refer to any of the following places in Wisconsin:

- Eau Galle, St. Croix County, Wisconsin, a town
- Eau Galle, Dunn County, Wisconsin, a town
  - Eau Galle (community), Dunn County, Wisconsin, an unincorporated community
- Eau Galle River

== See also ==
- Eau Gallie, Florida
- Eau Gallee, Haiti, saltwater lake AKA Trou Caïman
