= Eau Galle, Wisconsin =

Eau Galle is the name of some places in the U.S. state of Wisconsin:

- Eau Galle, Dunn County, Wisconsin, a town
- Eau Galle (community), Dunn County, Wisconsin, an unincorporated community
- Eau Galle, St. Croix County, Wisconsin, a town
