= Spring Valley, Wisconsin =

- Village
- Location of Spring Valley in Pierce County and St. Croix County, Wisconsin.
- Coordinates: 44°50′50″N 92°14′24″W
- Country: United States
- State: Wisconsin
- Counties: Pierce, St. Croix

Area
  - Total: 4.32 sq mi (11.20 km^{2})
  - Land: 3.97 sq mi (10.28 km^{2})
  - Water: 0.36 sq mi (0.92 km^{2})
- Elevation: 909 ft (277 m)

Population (2020)
  - Total: 1,401
  - Density: 339.6/sq mi (131.13/km^{2})
- Time zone: UTC-6 (Central (CST))
  - Summer (DST): UTC-5 (CDT)
- Area codes: 715 & 534
- FIPS code: 55-76300
- GNIS feature ID: 1574697
- Website: vi.springvalley.wi.gov

Spring Valley is a village in Pierce and St. Croix counties in Wisconsin, United States. The population was 1,401 at the 2020 census. Of those, 1,390 were in Pierce County and 11 in St. Croix County. The village is mostly within the Town of Spring Lake in Pierce County. Small parts also lie in the Town of Gilman, also in Pierce County, and the Town of Cady in St. Croix County.

== Geography ==
Spring Valley is located at 44°50′50″N 92°14′24″W (44.847111, -92.240130), along the Eau Galle River.

According to the United States Census Bureau, the village has an area of 4.54 square miles (11.76 km^{2}), of which 4.14 square miles (10.72 km^{2}) is land and 0.40 square miles (1.04 km^{2}) is water.

== History ==
The Spring Valley area was first settled by logging crews in 1857. They had followed the Eau Galle River upstream from the sawmill settlement in Eau Galle, WI. The first family settled in 1861. The first school was built in 1867. The post office was established in 1870. A watermill was constructed in 1874. Iron ore had been discovered in the area in 1876, however mining would not take place until 1891/92. It was at that time the Eagle Iron (later Spring Valley Iron and Ore Company) started the “pig iron” industry. The smelting and ore industry would bring a large number of people to the village. This included miners, smelters, businessmen, and freemasons. Many of whom brought families. In 1895 Spring Valley officially became incorporated. Since then, Spring Valley has continued to grow while honoring and celebrating the historical past as residents get together to celebrate “Dam Days” (in reference to the many floods requiring a dam to be built).

=== Pig Iron Smelting Industry ===
The Eagle Iron Company and later, the Spring Valley Iron and Ore Company, had pig iron smelting operations here between 1892 and 1917. Enough business was generated to bring a branch line of the Minnesota and Wisconsin Railway through the village. When the Iron market bottomed out the ore deposits east of town and in nearby Gilman Township became too costly to mine and the facilities were dismantled. All that remains is the 80 foot elevator shaft which stand to this day. The railroad, eventually running through Elmwood, discontinued service in 1966.

=== Floods ===
The Eau Galle river and the valley the village sits in were prone to major floods pre-1968. The 1942 flood is the most well-known. Precipitation over much of the upper Mississippi River basin during September 1942 was above normal conditions.

On September 16, 1942, a low-pressure system developed over the northern Plains States, advancing into the upper Mississippi Basin by the 17-18th. Moist maritime tropical air over the lower Ohio Valley and the Great Lakes was lifted by a cold wedge of continental polar air in northwestern Wisconsin and resulted in unusually intense rains during the night of the 17th over a small area, especially in the Eau Galle and Red Cedar River watersheds. The most damaging flood occurred in Spring Valley, Wis., in the narrow flood plain of the Eau Galle River, which has a drainage area of only 78 square miles above the flooded town. The flood stage was at just under 20 feet.

In Spring Valley, with about 260 homes there were only 25 of these that were on high enough ground to escape the destructive effects of the flood. Fortunately no lives were lost. The damages from the flood in Spring Valley and in neighboring areas in Pierce County had been estimated at more than $1,000,000.

=== Eau Galle Dam and Reservoir ===
Following the devastating floods, the Eau Galle Dam and Reservoir, with its dam, lake (Lake George), recreation areas and channel improvements, was authorized by the Flood Control Act of 1958 as a result of repeated flooding in the Spring Valley area. The 649-acre project was built from 1965 to 1968 and is located just north of Spring Valley, WI. The Eau Galle recreation area is operated by the U.S. Army Corps of Engineers, St. Paul District.

The large rolled-earth and rock-filled dam manages a 64-square-mile drainage basin of the Eau Galle River, which flows into the Chippewa River and eventually enters the Mississippi River. The outlet structures include an uncontrolled morning glory inlet that releases water from the surface and a vertical slide gate that releases water from the bottom.

== Natural attractions ==
Crystal Cave is about a mile southwest of Spring Valley. This privately held natural attraction, formed millions of years ago by ground water eroding the sandstone and dolomite that underlies the area, has been open to tourists since 1942. A local 16-year-old discovered an opening to the cave in 1881. It was excavated, developed and promoted to the public by an Eau Claire, Wisconsin amateur geologist and advertising man. Opening day drew 4,000 visitors. The owners have retained the flavor of the 1950s and enjoy sharing the site's geologic history with visitors.

Promoted as the Midwest's largest earthen dam, Eau Galle Dam and Recreation, northwest of town, was built by the Army Corps of Engineers in 1965 to protect Spring Valley from the Eau Galle River's surging flood waters. A recreational area has grown up around the dam's reservoir, Lake George.

== Demographics ==
Historical population
Census	Pop.	Note	%±
1900	1,021		—
1910	972		−4.8%
1920	939		−3.4%
1930	896		−4.6%
1940	973		8.6%
1950	975		0.2%
1960	977		0.2%
1970	995		1.8%
1980	982		−1.3%
1990	1,051		7.0%
2000	1,189		13.1%
2010	1,352		13.7%
2020	1,401		3.6%
U.S. Decennial Census

=== 2010 census ===
As of the census of 2010, there were 1,352 people, 547 households, and 372 families living in the village. The population density was 326.6 inhabitants per square mile (126.1/km^{2}). There were 597 housing units at an average density of 144.2 per square mile (55.7/km^{2}). The racial makeup of the village was 98.4% White, 0.4% African American, 0.1% Native American, 0.3% Asian, 0.4% from other races, and 0.4% from two or more races. Hispanic or Latino of any race were 1.3% of the population.

There were 547 households, of which 35.1% had children under the age of 18 living with them, 53.9% were married couples living together, 9.3% had a female householder with no husband present, 4.8% had a male householder with no wife present, and 32.0% were non-families. 26.9% of all households were made up of individuals, and 11.5% had someone living alone who was 65 years of age or older. The average household size was 2.40 and the average family size was 2.90.

The median age in the village was 38.2 years. 25.7% of residents were under the age of 18; 5.8% were between the ages of 18 and 24; 27.2% were from 25 to 44; 27.8% were from 45 to 64; and 13.5% were 65 years of age or older. The gender makeup of the village was 49.3% male and 50.7% female.

=== 2000 census ===
As of the census of 2000, there were 1,189 people, 459 households, and 296 families living in the village. The population density was 318.0 inhabitants per square mile (122.8/km^{2}). There were 482 housing units at an average density of 128.9 per square mile (49.8/km^{2}). The racial makeup of the village was 98.82% White, 0.08% African American, 0.17% Native American, 0.08% Asian, and 0.84% from two or more races. Hispanic or Latino of any race were 0.59% of the population.

There were 459 households, out of which 35.5% had children under the age of 18 living with them, 51.2% were married couples living together, 9.6% had a female householder with no husband present, and 35.3% were non-families. 30.5% of all households were made up of individuals, and 16.8% had someone living alone who was 65 years of age or older. The average household size was 2.46 and the average family size was 3.08.

In the village, the population was spread out, with 26.9% under the age of 18, 8.2% from 18 to 24, 25.7% from 25 to 44, 20.7% from 45 to 64, and 18.5% who were 65 years of age or older. The median age was 38 years. For every 100 females, there were 93.6 males. For every 100 females age 18 and over, there were 84.9 males.

The median income for a household in the village was $38,482, and the median income for a family was $45,714. Males had a median income of $35,000 versus $22,292 for females. The per capita income for the village was $17,844. About 2.4% of families and 5.9% of the population were below the poverty line, including 3.9% of those under age 18 and 14.3% of those age 65 or over.

== See also ==
- List of cities in Wisconsin
