= Stanton, Wisconsin =

Stanton, Wisconsin may refer to:

- Stanton, Dunn County, Wisconsin, a town
- Stanton, St. Croix County, Wisconsin, a town
- Stanton (community), Wisconsin, an unincorporated community
- Plover, Wisconsin, in Portage County, was previously known as Stanton
