= Olivet, Wisconsin =

- Unincorporated community
- Location within Wisconsin Location within the United States
- Coordinates: 44°47′11″N 92°15′26″W
- Country: United States
- State: Wisconsin
- County: Pierce
- Elevation: 1,155 ft (352 m)
- Time zone: UTC-6 (Central (CST))
  - Summer (DST): UTC-5 (CDT)
- Zip: 54019
- Area codes: 715 & 534
- GNIS feature ID: 1570802

Olivet /ˈɒlɪvɪt/ OL-ih-vit) is an unincorporated community located in the towns of Gilman and Spring Lake, Pierce County, Wisconsin, United States. Olivet is located on County Highway CC, 4 miles (6.4 km) south of Spring Valley.
