= Glenwood, Wisconsin =

- Town
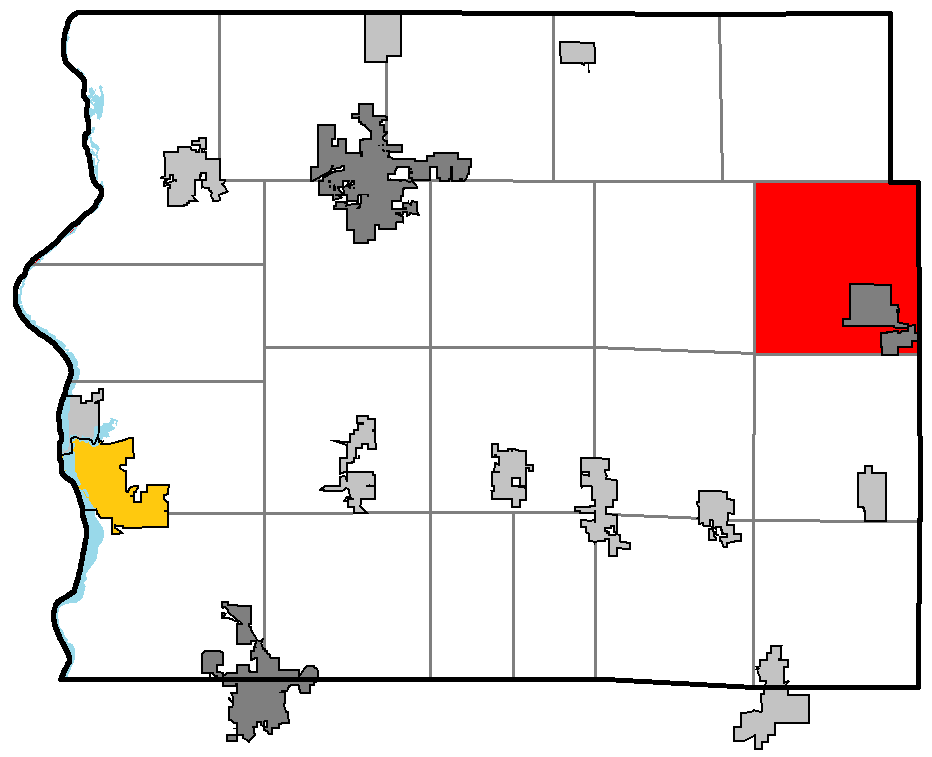
- Location of Glenwood, within St. Croix County

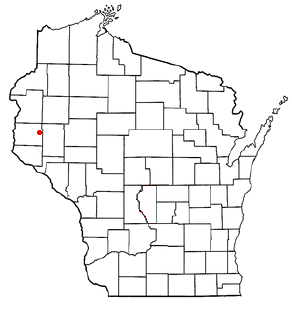
- Location of Glenwood, Wisconsin
- Coordinates: 45°4′23″N 92°10′56″W
- Country: United States
- State: Wisconsin
- County: St. Croix

Area
  - Total: 34.4 sq mi (89.0 km^{2})
  - Land: 34.2 sq mi (88.7 km^{2})
  - Water: 0.12 sq mi (0.3 km^{2})
- Elevation: 1,191 ft (363 m)

Population (2020)
  - Total: 747
  - Density: 21.8/sq mi (8.42/km^{2})
- Time zone: UTC-6 (Central (CST))
  - Summer (DST): UTC-5 (CDT)
- Area codes: 715 & 534
- FIPS code: 55-29600
- GNIS feature ID: 1583286
- Website: https://www.townofglenwoodstcroix.com/

Glenwood is a town in St. Croix County, Wisconsin, United States. The population was 747 at the 2020 census. The unincorporated community of Emerald is located partially in the town.

== Geography ==
According to the United States Census Bureau, the town has a total area of 34.4 square miles (89.0 km^{2}), of which 34.2 square miles (88.7 km^{2}) is land and 0.1 square mile (0.3 km^{2}) (0.38%) is water.

== Demographics ==
Historical population
Census	Pop.	Note	%±
2010	785		—
2020	747		−4.8%

As of the census of 2000, there were 755 people, 254 households, and 194 families residing in the town. The population density was 22.1 inhabitants per square mile (8.5/km^{2}). There were 263 housing units at an average density of 7.7 per square mile (3.0/km^{2}). The racial makeup of the town was 98.01% White, 0.26% Native American, 0.66% Asian, 0.79% from other races, and 0.26% from two or more races. Hispanic or Latino of any race were 0.93% of the population.

There were 254 households, out of which 43.7% had children under the age of 18 living with them, 66.5% were married couples living together, 2.0% had a female householder with no husband present, and 23.6% were non-families. 19.7% of all households were made up of individuals, and 5.1% had someone living alone who was 65 years of age or older. The average household size was 2.97 and the average family size was 3.42.

In the town, the population was spread out, with 32.3% under the age of 18, 5.4% from 18 to 24, 31.4% from 25 to 44, 20.0% from 45 to 64, and 10.9% who were 65 years of age or older. The median age was 35 years. For every 100 females, there were 115.1 males. For every 100 females age 18 and over, there were 118.4 males.

The median income for a household in the town was $47,222, and the median income for a family was $54,432. Males had a median income of $35,962 versus $21,696 for females. The per capita income for the town was $17,037. About 3.6% of families and 7.2% of the population were below the poverty line, including 10.3% of those under age 18 and 2.3% of those age 65 or over.
