= Hatchville, Wisconsin =

- Unincorporated community
- Location within Wisconsin Location within the United States
- Coordinates: 44°51′29″N 92°08′11″W
- Country: United States
- State: Wisconsin
- Counties: Dunn, Pierce, St. Croix
- Towns: Lucas, Weston, Spring Lake, Cady
- Elevation: 1,204 ft (367 m)
- Time zone: UTC-6 (Central (CST))
  - Summer (DST): UTC-5 (CDT)
- Area codes: 715 & 534
- GNIS feature ID: 1581642

Hatchville is an unincorporated community located in the towns of Lucas and Weston in Dunn County, Spring Lake in Pierce County, and Cady in St. Croix counties, Wisconsin, United States. The community was named after two brothers, Frank and Ed Hatch, who owned and operated a combined store and community center. Frank Hatch opened the post office in November 1889.
