= Crystal Cave (Wisconsin) =

Cave

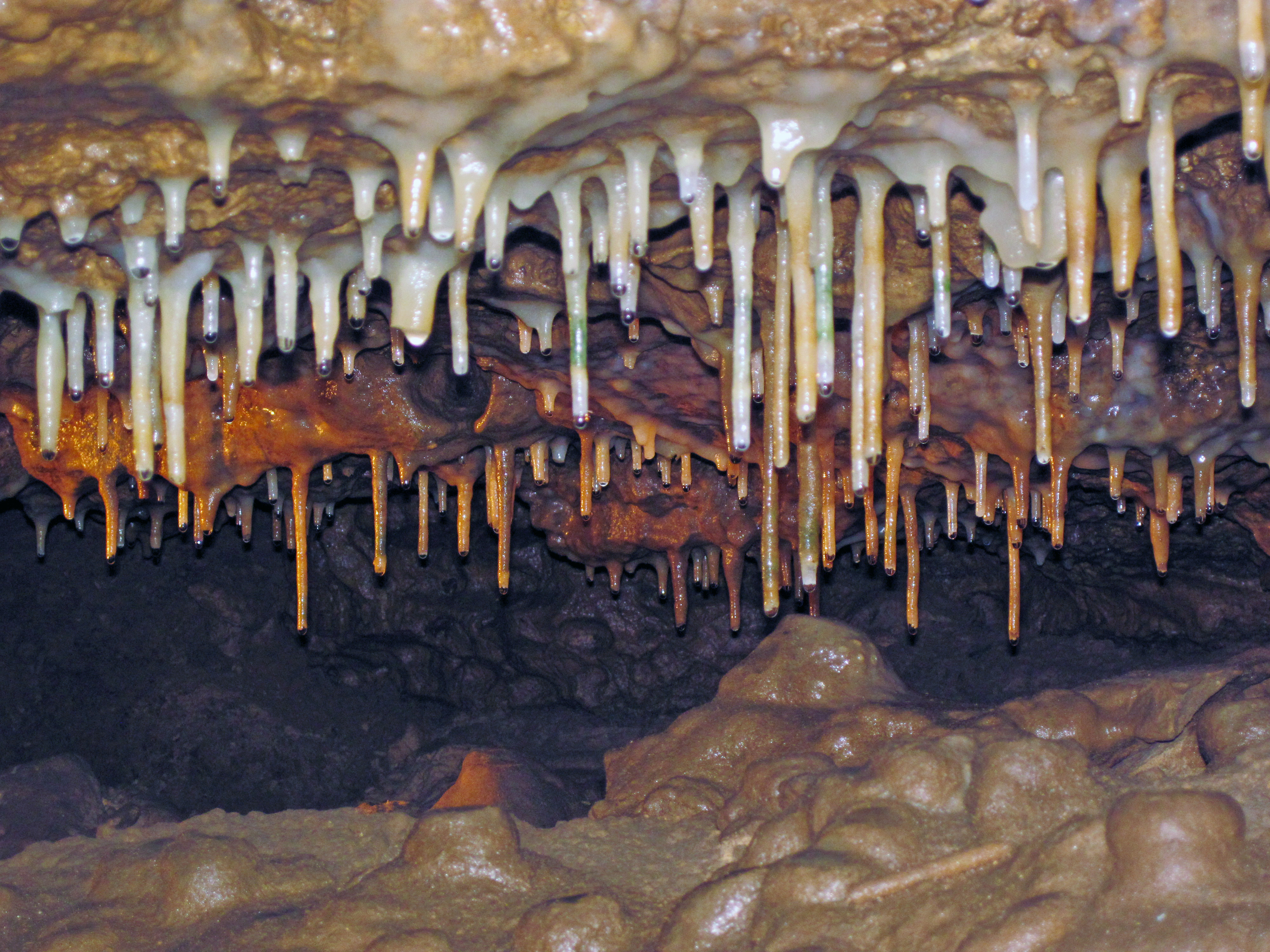
- Travertine soda straw stalactites and bulbous stalagmites in Crystal Cave

- Location within Wisconsin
- Coordinates: 44.832567°N 92.251950°W
- Discovery: 1881

Crystal Cave is a cave located in Wisconsin’s Pierce County, near the Town of Spring Valley on Highway 29. The cave was discovered in 1881 by local brothers George and William Vanasse. Crystal Cave is a multi-level solutional cave formed in dolomite bedrock in the Prairie du Chien Group. The dolomite was formed 485 million years ago during the Lower Ordovician Period when a warm shallow ocean covered much of Minnesota and Wisconsin. It is Wisconsin's longest known cave.

== Geology ==
Crystal Cave is a multi-level maze type of solutional cave consisting of three levels. It extends to a depth of 69 ft. (21 m.) and is 4600 ft. (1.4 km.) in length, contained completely in the Prairie du Chen Group. The bedrock forming the cave walls formed during the Ordovician Period. The third level is the most extensive of the three, having developed along existing Northeast to Southwest trending joints in the bedrock. Dating the period the cave began to form has proven difficult because of erosion by glacial waters and the deposit of debris during the Wisconsin Glaciation from the nearby terminus of the Laurentide Ice Sheet's Superior lobe. The commonly accepted theory of the cave's formation is that it was formed by a weak carbonic acid solution formed from rainwater and snowmelt that mixed with biogenic carbon dioxide found in the topsoil, which then infiltrated existing joints and fractures in the bedrock, expanding them into the openings that make up the cave's passageways. Some have advanced that the cave's formation is actually hypogenic in origin.

== Speleothems ==
The cave contains a variety of formations, mostly concentrated in the southeast portion of the cave, where conditions are optimal for their growth. The speleothems present in the cave take a number of forms, most commonly stalactites (including the variant known as soda straws), stalagmites, columns, flow stone, draperies, and ribbons, but also including helictites, and cave pearls in rarer instances.

== Discovery ==
The cave was discovered in 1881 by William R. Vanasse, a local youth who discovered the entrance to the cave when he was exploring a leaf-filled sink in a farm field near his home. Initial exploration of the cave was performed by William and his younger brother George. The brothers rappeled into the cave using rope via the original entrance, now located near the gift shop.

== Commercialization ==
The cave and surrounding property was developed into a show cave by local advertiser and amateur geologist Henry A. Friede of Eau Claire, Wisconsin. Friede had been interested in opening a show cave for some time, having been inspired by the success of similar business ventures, such as Blue Mounds (now known as Cave of the Mounds) and the show caves near Harmony, Minnesota. The land was purchased by Friede and shortly after, on November 2, 1941, work was started to remove the glacial debris left in the cave that filled many of the passages on the second and third levels. At this same time, Alvin Peterson, a local architect, was engaged by Friede to design the entrance building.

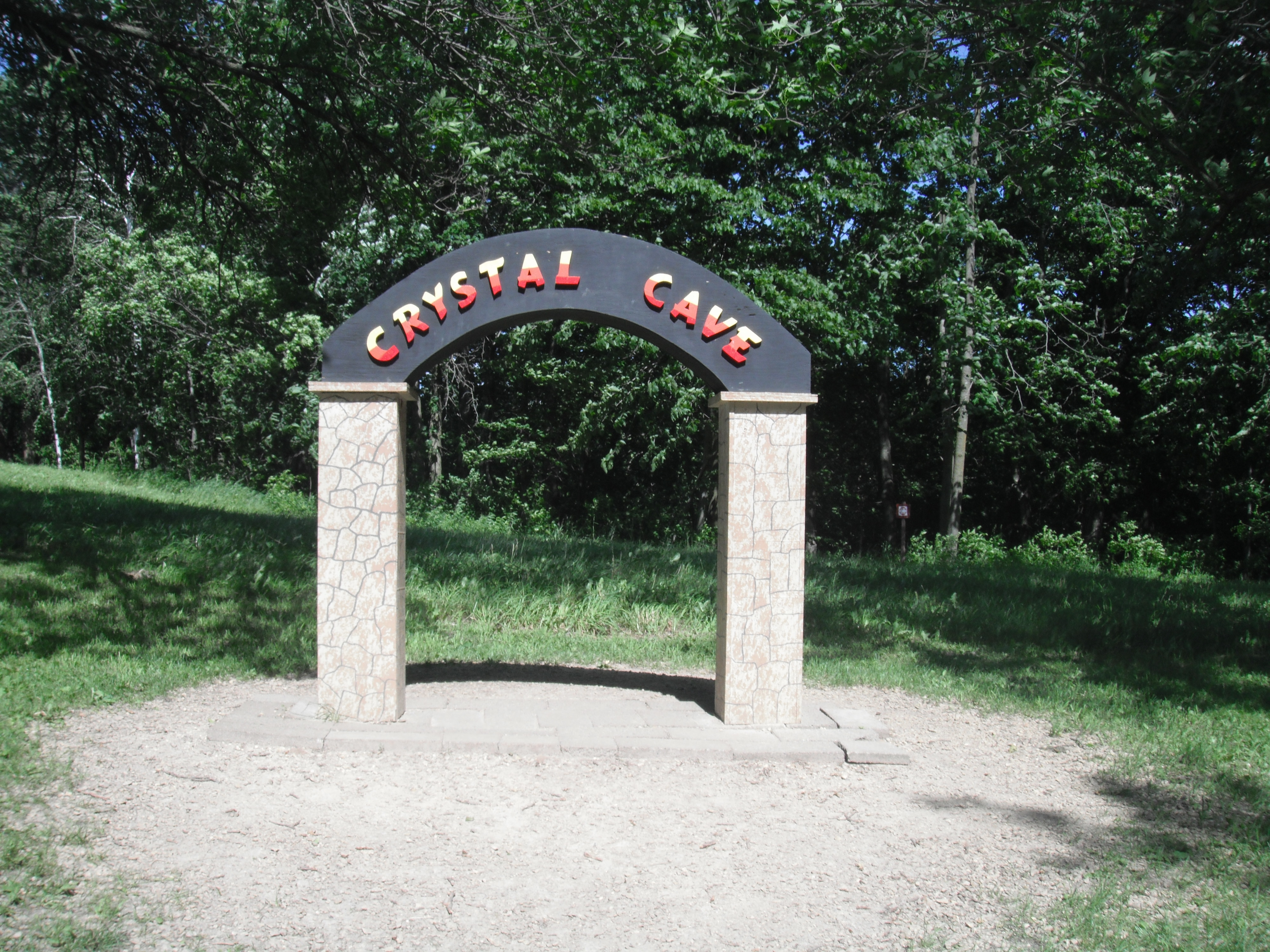
Miniature model of front entry arch present in picnic area

By April 1942 much of the debris had been removed and construction was begun on the entry building that had been designed by Peterson. The newly christened “Crystal Cave” was set to open on the Memorial Day weekend of 1942, but this plan was disrupted by heavy rains in the area. The opening of the cave was delayed until June 7, 1942.

== Further exploration ==
The period following the 1942 opening of the cave to the public saw little exploration beyond the 400 m (1300 ft.) that was excavated to open the original tour route. This was because known side leads in the cave were considered too narrow for exploration by Friedes and subsequent owners. This remained the case until 1986, when the cave was acquired by geologists Blaze and Jean Cunningham. The Cunninghams opened the cave (and surrounding property) to exploration by both the Minnesota Speleological Survey, and the Wisconsin Speleological Society, leading to the discovery of several additional passages. These new passages are considered “wild cave” meaning that no commercial development of them is planned. This policy continued when the cave came under new ownership in 2012; the cave was purchased by Eric, and Kristen McMaster.

== Other caves ==
Since the opening of the property to cave explorers, a number of other caves have been discovered. These caves are not generally open to the public, only being accessed during private events. The only exception to this is South Portal cave, which was opened to the public via "Wild Tours" in early August 2015.

== Weather station ==
In September 2014, a weather monitoring station was installed on the property. The station is operated by the Citizen Weather Observer Program to provide more accuracy in weather predictions for the surrounding area.

== Bomb shelter ==
In late June 1942, the cave was designated a public bomb shelter when Henry Friede offered it for such a purpose to the Village Board of Spring Valley, Wisconsin. At the time, the cave was the only shelter in the Midwest able to hold the entire population of the town it was intended to protect.
