= Erin Prairie, Wisconsin =

- Town
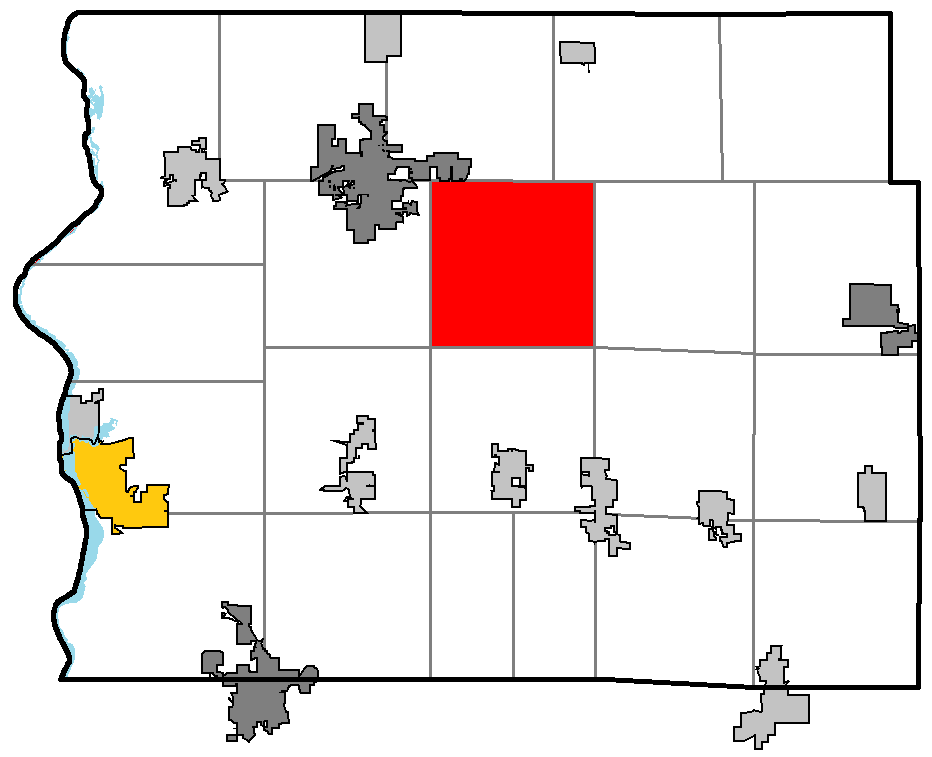
- Location of Erin Prairie, within St. Croix County

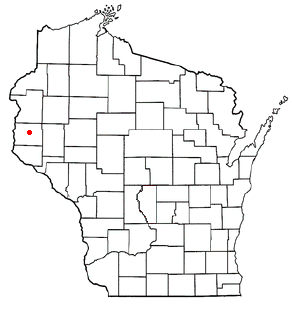
- Location of Erin Prairie, Wisconsin
- Coordinates: 45°5′12″N 92°25′36″W
- Country: United States
- State: Wisconsin
- County: St. Croix

Area
  - Total: 35.6 sq mi (92.3 km^{2})
  - Land: 35.4 sq mi (91.8 km^{2})
  - Water: 0.15 sq mi (0.4 km^{2})
- Elevation: 1,080 ft (330 m)

Population (2020)
  - Total: 673
  - Density: 19.0/sq mi (7.33/km^{2})
- Time zone: UTC-6 (Central (CST))
  - Summer (DST): UTC-5 (CDT)
- Area codes: 715 & 534
- FIPS code: 55-24275
- GNIS feature ID: 1583172
- Website: https://townoferinprairie.com/

Erin Prairie is a town in St. Croix County, Wisconsin, United States. The population was 673 at the 2020 census. The unincorporated communities of Erin Corner and Jewitt are located in the town.

== Geography ==
According to the United States Census Bureau, the town has a total area of 35.6 square miles (92.3 km^{2}), of which 35.5 square miles (91.8 km^{2}) is land and 0.2 square mile (0.4 km^{2}) (0.45%) is water.

== Demographics ==
Historical population
Census	Pop.	Note	%±
2010	688		—
2012 (est.)	689		0.1%

As of the census of 2000, there were 658 people, 227 households, and 189 families residing in the town. The population density was 18.6 inhabitants per square mile (7.2/km^{2}). There were 234 housing units at an average density of 6.6 per square mile (2.5/km^{2}). The racial makeup of the town was 98.02% White, 0.76% African American, 0.15% Native American, 0.91% from other races, and 0.15% from two or more races. Hispanic or Latino of any race were 0.91% of the population.

There were 227 households, out of which 41.4% had children under the age of 18 living with them, 74.9% were married couples living together, 4.8% had a female householder with no husband present, and 16.7% were non-families. 12.8% of all households were made up of individuals, and 4.4% had someone living alone who was 65 years of age or older. The average household size was 2.90 and the average family size was 3.18.

In the town, the population was spread out, with 28.7% under the age of 18, 7.9% from 18 to 24, 31.8% from 25 to 44, 23.9% from 45 to 64, and 7.8% who were 65 years of age or older. The median age was 37 years. For every 100 females, there were 103.1 males. For every 100 females age 18 and over, there were 111.3 males.

The median income for a household in the town was $65,938, and the median income for a family was $72,955. Males had a median income of $45,114 versus $25,156 for females. The per capita income for the town was $23,772. About 1.1% of families and 3.0% of the population were below the poverty line, including 6.1% of those under age 18 and 8.2% of those age 65 or over.
