= Viking, Wisconsin =

- Unincorporated community
- Location within Wisconsin Location within the United States
- Coordinates: 44°51′42″N 92°21′33″W
- Country: United States
- State: Wisconsin
- Counties: Pierce and St. Croix
- Elevation: 1,096 ft (334 m)
- Time zone: UTC-6 (Central (CST))
  - Summer (DST): UTC-5 (CDT)
- Area codes: 715 & 534
- GNIS feature ID: 1581751

Viking is an unincorporated community located in the town of Gilman in Pierce County and the town of Eau Galle in St. Croix County, Wisconsin, United States.
