= Erin Corner, Wisconsin =

- Unincorporated community
- Location within Wisconsin Location within the United States
- Coordinates: 45°04′46″N 92°26′14″W
- Country: United States
- State: Wisconsin
- County: St. Croix
- Elevation: 1,070 ft (330 m)
- Time zone: UTC-6 (Central (CST))
  - Summer (DST): UTC-5 (CDT)
- Area codes: 715 & 534
- GNIS feature ID: 1581629

Erin Corner is an unincorporated community located in the town of Erin Prairie, St. Croix County, Wisconsin, United States. Erin Corner is located at the junction of County Highways G and T, 5.5 miles (8.9 km) east-southeast of New Richmond.
