= Emerald, Wisconsin =

- Town
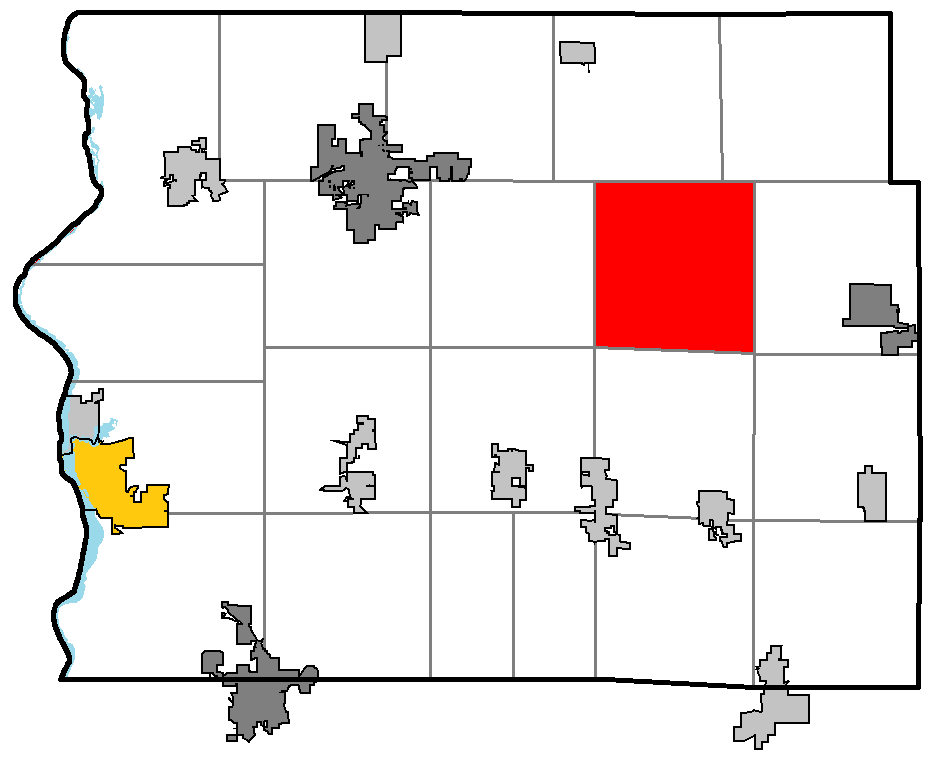
- Location of Emerald, within St. Croix County

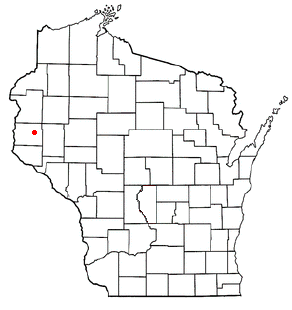
- Location of Emerald, Wisconsin
- Coordinates: 45°4′55″N 92°19′37″W
- Country: United States
- State: Wisconsin
- County: St. Croix

Area
  - Total: 34.9 sq mi (90.4 km^{2})
  - Land: 34.8 sq mi (90.2 km^{2})
  - Water: 0.077 sq mi (0.2 km^{2})
- Elevation: 1,168 ft (356 m)

Population (2020)
  - Total: 831
  - Density: 23.9/sq mi (9.21/km^{2})
- Time zone: UTC-6 (Central (CST))
  - Summer (DST): UTC-5 (CDT)
- Area codes: 715 & 534
- FIPS code: 55-23925
- GNIS feature ID: 1583163
- Website: https://townofemeraldwi.com/

Emerald is a town in St. Croix County, Wisconsin, United States. The population was 831 at the 2020 census. The census-designated place of Emerald is located partially in the town.

== History ==
The town was named for the greenness of the forests.

== Geography ==
According to the United States Census Bureau, the town has a total area of 34.9 square miles (90.4 km^{2}), of which 34.8 square miles (90.2 km^{2}) is land and 0.1 square mile (0.2 km^{2}) (0.23%) is water.

== Demographics ==
Historical population
Census	Pop.	Note	%±
2010	853		—
2020	831		−2.6%

As of the census of 2000, there were 691 people, 236 households, and 193 families residing in the town. The population density was 19.8 inhabitants per square mile (7.6/km^{2}). There were 244 housing units at an average density of 7.0 per square mile (2.7/km^{2}). The racial makeup of the town was 97.97% White, 0.14% African American, 0.29% Native American, 1.30% Asian, and 0.29% from two or more races.

There were 236 households, out of which 41.1% had children under the age of 18 living with them, 73.3% were married couples living together, 3.4% had a female householder with no husband present, and 18.2% were non-families. 11.4% of all households were made up of individuals, and 2.1% had someone living alone who was 65 years of age or older. The average household size was 2.93 and the average family size was 3.19.

In the town, the population was spread out, with 29.2% under the age of 18, 7.1% from 18 to 24, 31.3% from 25 to 44, 25.0% from 45 to 64, and 7.4% who were 65 years of age or older. The median age was 35 years. For every 100 females, there were 106.3 males. For every 100 females age 18 and over, there were 109.9 males.

The median income for a household in the town was $47,500, and the median income for a family was $52,500. Males had a median income of $35,625 versus $27,500 for females. The per capita income for the town was $19,190. About 3.9% of families and 3.7% of the population were below the poverty line, including 4.1% of those under age 18 and none of those age 65 or over.

== Notable people ==
- Burleigh Grimes, baseball player, was born in Emerald, Wisconsin

== See also ==
- List of towns in Wisconsin
