= Jewett, Wisconsin =

- Unincorporated community
- Location within Wisconsin Location within the United States
- Coordinates: 45°07′03″N 92°26′11″W
- Country: United States
- State: Wisconsin
- County: St. Croix
- Elevation: 1,040 ft (320 m)
- Time zone: UTC-6 (Central (CST))
  - Summer (DST): UTC-5 (CDT)
- Area codes: 715 & 534
- GNIS feature ID: 1581658

Jewett is an unincorporated community located in the town of Erin Prairie, St. Croix County, Wisconsin, United States. Jewett is located on County Highway T, 5 miles (8.0 km) east of New Richmond. The community was named for Samuel A. Jewett, a Maine native who operated saw mills on the Chippewa and St. Croix rivers beginning in 1850.
