= Emerald (CDP), Wisconsin =

Census-designated place in Wisconsin, United States

Emerald, Wisconsin
- Census-designated place
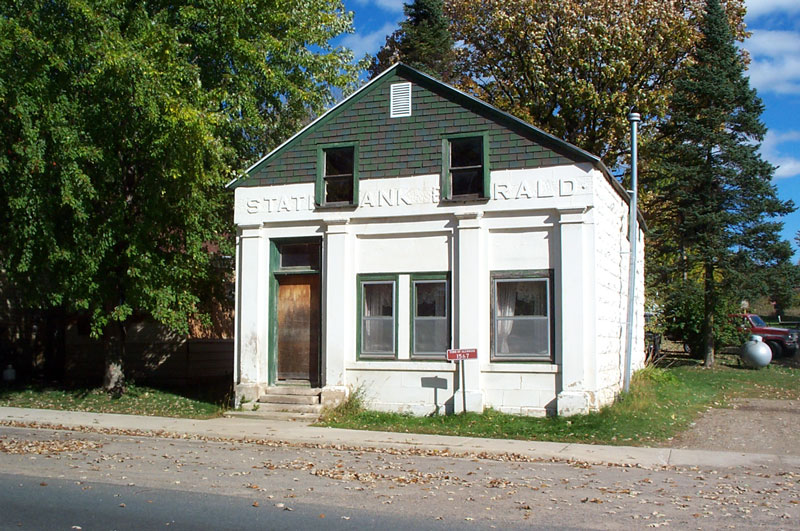
- Former bank in Emerald

- Location within Wisconsin
- Coordinates: 45°04′59″N 92°15′30″W
- Country: United States
- State: Wisconsin
- County: St. Croix

Area
  - Total: 1.882 sq mi (4.87 km^{2})
  - Land: 1.866 sq mi (4.83 km^{2})
  - Water: 0.016 sq mi (0.041 km^{2})
- Elevation: 1,152 ft (351 m)

Population (2020)
  - Total: 145
  - Density: 77.7/sq mi (30.0/km^{2})
- Time zone: UTC-6 (Central (CST))
  - Summer (DST): UTC-5 (CDT)
- Area codes: 715 & 534
- GNIS feature ID: 1581627

Emerald is a census-designated place in St. Croix County, Wisconsin, United States. Emerald is located in the towns of Emerald and Glenwood, 4.5 miles (7.2 km) west-northwest of Glenwood City. As of the 2010 census, its population was 161.

== History ==
A post office called Emerald was established in 1872, and remained in operation until it was discontinued in 1985. The community took its name from the Town of Emerald.

== See also ==
- List of census-designated places in Wisconsin
