= Palmer, Wisconsin =

- Unincorporated community
- Location within Wisconsin Location within the United States
- Coordinates: 44°54′20″N 92°23′42″W
- Country: United States
- State: Wisconsin
- County: St. Croix
- Elevation: 1,060 ft (320 m)
- Time zone: UTC-6 (Central (CST))
  - Summer (DST): UTC-5 (CDT)
- Area codes: 715 & 534
- GNIS feature ID: 1581798

Palmer is an unincorporated community in the town of Rush River, St. Croix County, Wisconsin, United States. The community was named for local land owner William Palmer, who moved to the area from New York in the 1860s. The Palmer post office opened in December 1893 with William McConnell as the first postmaster.
