= Lucas, Wisconsin =

- Town
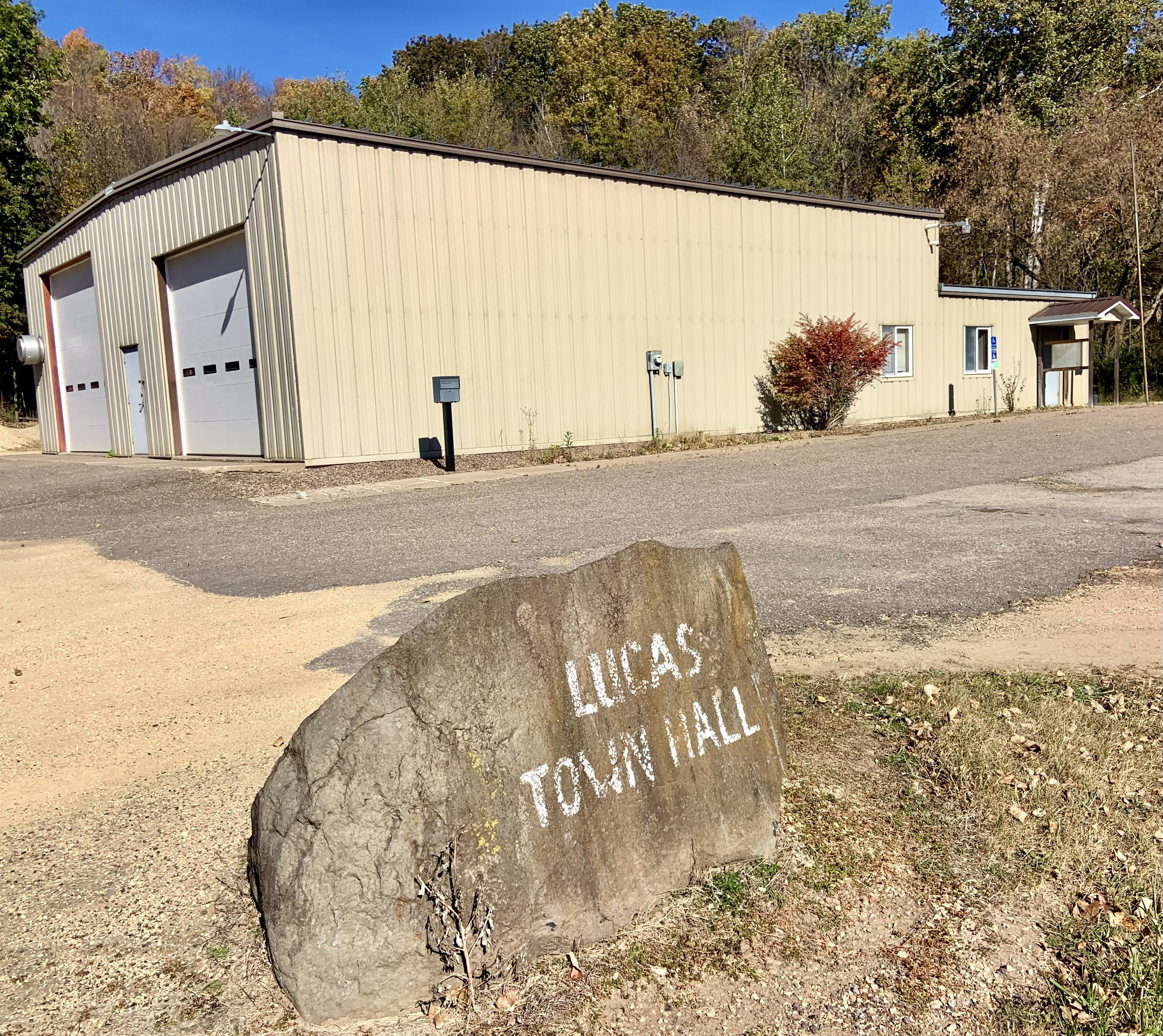
- Town hall

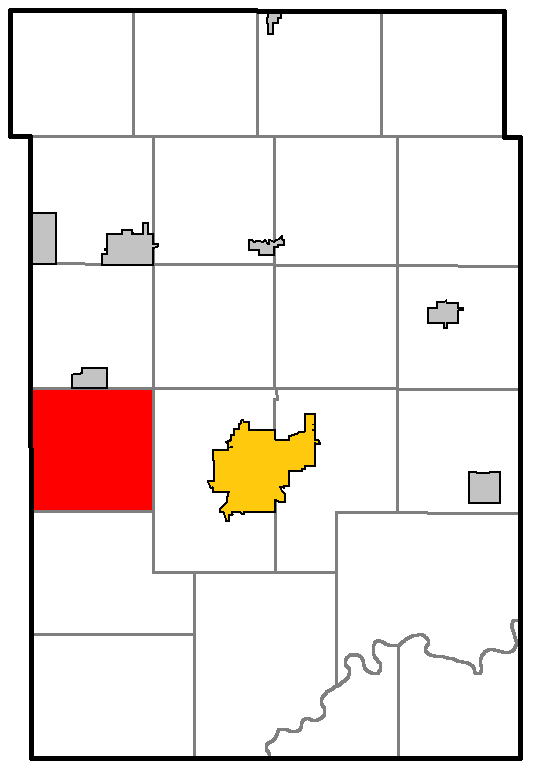
- Location of Lucas, within Dunn County, Wisconsin

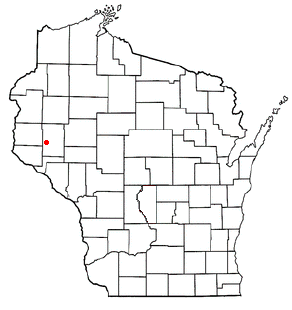
- Location of Lucas, Wisconsin
- Coordinates: 44°54′7″N 92°4′15″W
- Country: United States
- State: Wisconsin
- County: Dunn

Area
  - Total: 35.8 sq mi (92.6 km^{2})
  - Land: 35.8 sq mi (92.6 km^{2})
  - Water: 0 sq mi (0.0 km^{2})
- Elevation: 1,076 ft (328 m)

Population (2020)
  - Total: 698
  - Density: 19.5/sq mi (7.54/km^{2})
- Time zone: UTC-6 (Central (CST))
  - Summer (DST): UTC-5 (CDT)
- Area codes: 715 & 534
- FIPS code: 55-46175
- GNIS feature ID: 1583606
- Website: https://www.townoflucas.org/

Lucas is a town in Dunn County, Wisconsin, United States. The population was 698 at the 2020 census. The unincorporated community of Hatchville is located partially in the town.

== Geography ==
The town is rural in character, consisting of farms and forest. According to the United States Census Bureau, the town has a total area of 35.7 square miles (92.6 km^{2}), all land. The bedrock is sandstone and the land is relatively flat with an average elevation of 1079 ft. (329 m.) above sea level.

== Demographics ==
Historical population
Census	Pop.	Note	%±
1990	644		—
2000	658		2.2%
2010	764		16.1%
2020	698		−8.6%

As of the census of 2000, there were 658 people, 240 households, and 185 families residing in the town. The population density was 18.4 people per square mile (7.1/km^{2}). There were 256 housing units at an average density of 7.2 per square mile (2.8/km^{2}). The racial makeup of the town was 98.78% White, 0.46% African American, 0.30% Asian, 0.15% from other races, and 0.30% from two or more races. Hispanic or Latino of any race were 0.91% of the population.

There were 240 households, out of which 37.1% had children under the age of 18 living with them, 62.5% were married couples living together, 7.5% had a female householder with no husband present, and 22.9% were non-families. 19.6% of all households were made up of individuals, and 4.2% had someone living alone who was 65 years of age or older. The average household size was 2.74 and the average family size was 3.11.

In the town, the population was spread out, with 26.9% under the age of 18, 8.5% from 18 to 24, 31.0% from 25 to 44, 24.6% from 45 to 64, and 9.0% who were 65 years of age or older. The median age was 35 years. For every 100 females, there were 116.4 males. For every 100 females age 18 and over, there were 117.6 males.

The median income for a household in the town was $43,750, and the median income for a family was $48,125. Males had a median income of $30,795 versus $23,750 for females. The per capita income for the town was $21,646. About 6.8% of families and 9.7% of the population were below the poverty line, including 14.9% of those under age 18 and 4.5% of those age 65 or over.
