= Rush River, Wisconsin =

- Town
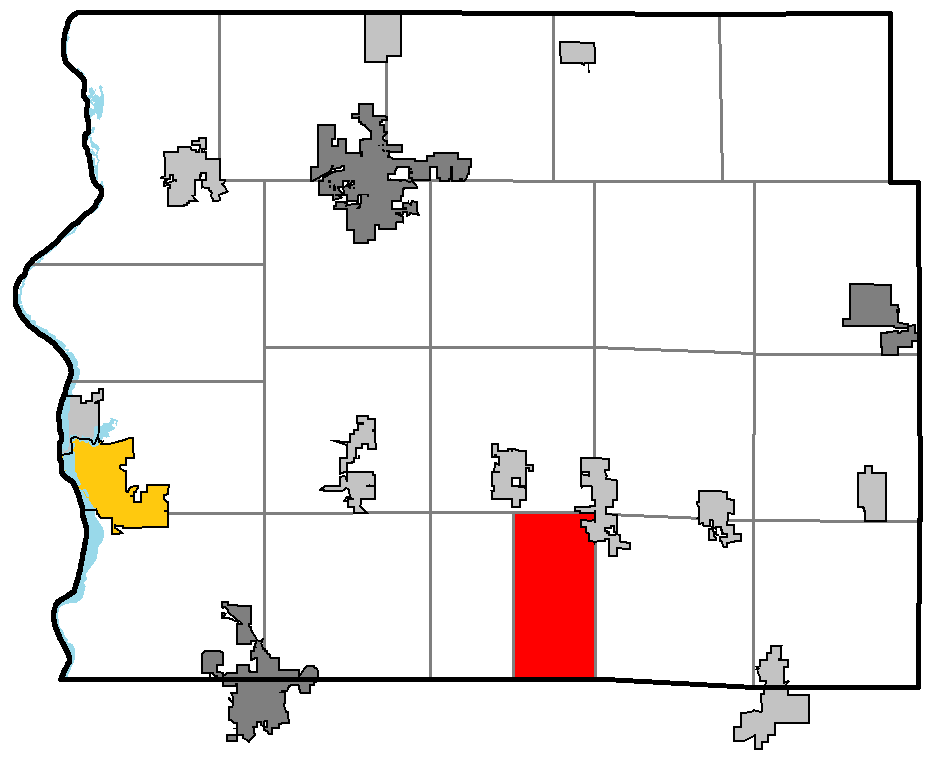
- Location of Rush River, within St. Croix County

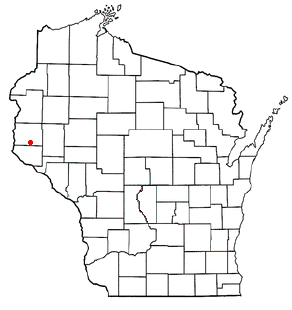
- Location of Rush River, Wisconsin
- Coordinates: 44°54′6″N 92°24′36″W
- Country: United States
- State: Wisconsin
- County: St. Croix

Area
  - Total: 17.9 sq mi (46.3 km^{2})
  - Land: 17.9 sq mi (46.3 km^{2})
  - Water: 0 sq mi (0.0 km^{2})
- Elevation: 1,106 ft (337 m)

Population (2020)
  - Total: 500
  - Density: 28/sq mi (11/km^{2})
- Time zone: UTC-6 (Central (CST))
  - Summer (DST): UTC-5 (CDT)
- Area codes: 715 & 534
- FIPS code: 55-70200
- GNIS feature ID: 1584077
- Website: https://townofrushriver.org/

Rush River is a town in St. Croix County, Wisconsin, United States. The population was 500 at the 2020 census. The unincorporated communities of Centerville and Palmer are located in the town.

== Geography ==
According to the United States Census Bureau, the town has a total area of 17.9 square miles (46.3 km^{2}), all land.

== Demographics ==
Historical population
Census	Pop.	Note	%±
2000	498		—
2010	508		2.0%
2020	500		−1.6%

As of the census of 2000, there were 498 people, 171 households, and 149 families residing in the town. The population density was 27.9 inhabitants per square mile (10.8/km^{2}). There were 173 housing units at an average density of 9.7 per square mile (3.7/km^{2}). The racial makeup of the town was 96.79% White, 0.20% African American, 0.40% Native American, 1.20% Asian, and 1.41% from two or more races.

There were 171 households, out of which 38.0% had children under the age of 18 living with them, 81.3% were married couples living together, 2.9% had a female householder with no husband present, and 12.3% were non-families. 10.5% of all households were made up of individuals, and 4.7% had someone living alone who was 65 years of age or older. The average household size was 2.91 and the average family size was 3.10.

In the town, the population was spread out, with 27.9% under the age of 18, 6.8% from 18 to 24, 31.1% from 25 to 44, 21.9% from 45 to 64, and 12.2% who were 65 years of age or older. The median age was 39 years. For every 100 females, there were 108.4 males. For every 100 females age 18 and over, there were 107.5 males.

The median income for a household in the town was $58,333, and the median income for a family was $61,667. Males had a median income of $41,625 versus $27,292 for females. The per capita income for the town was $23,240. None of the families and 2.0% of the population were living below the poverty line, including no under eighteens and none of those over 64.
