= Wildwood, Wisconsin =

- Unincorporated community
- Location within Wisconsin Location within the United States
- Coordinates: 44°53′31″N 92°17′58″W
- Country: United States
- State: Wisconsin
- County: St. Croix
- Elevation: 1,122 ft (342 m)
- Time zone: UTC-6 (Central (CST))
  - Summer (DST): UTC-5 (CDT)
- Area codes: 715 & 534
- GNIS feature ID: 1581753

Wildwood is an unincorporated community in the town of Eau Galle, St. Croix, Wisconsin, United States.

It has a population of 957 according to homes.com

== History ==
A post office called Wildwood was established in 1882, and remained in operation until it was discontinued in 1899. The community was named from a virgin forest surrounding the original town site.
