= Spring Lake, Wisconsin =

- Town
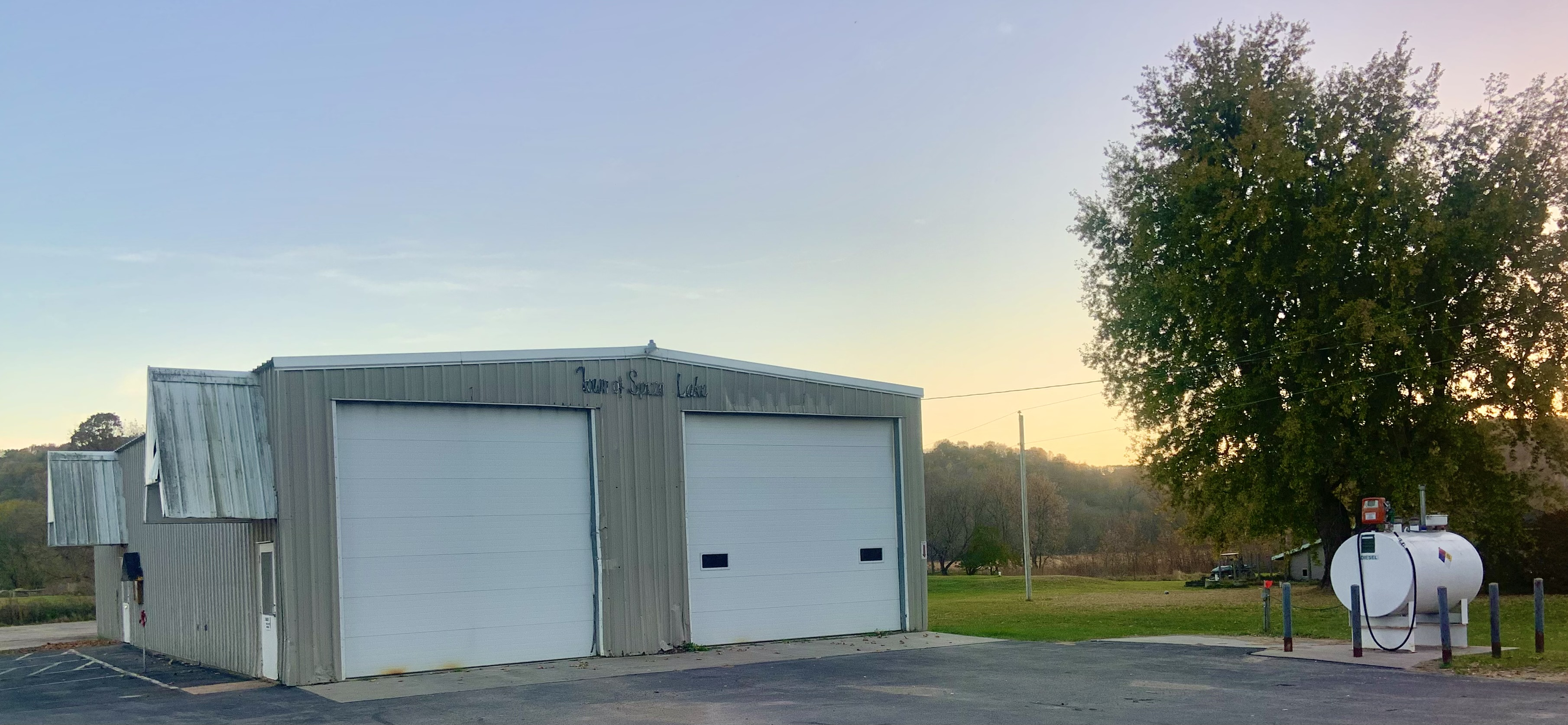
- Town hall

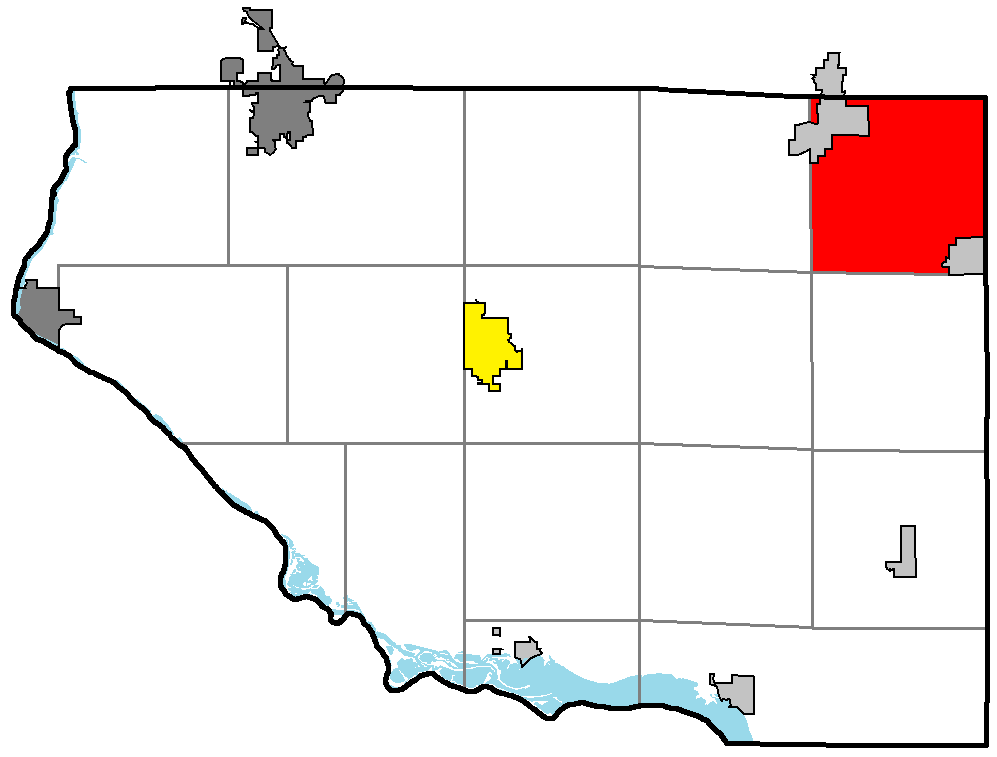
- Location of Spring Lake, within Pierce County

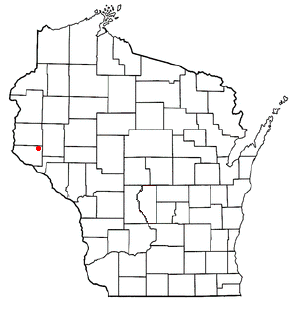
- Location of Spring Lake, Wisconsin
- Coordinates: 44°48′48″N 92°11′36″W
- Country: United States
- State: Wisconsin
- County: Pierce

Area
  - Total: 31.3 sq mi (81.0 km^{2})
  - Land: 31.3 sq mi (81.0 km^{2})
  - Water: 0 sq mi (0.0 km^{2})
- Elevation: 896 ft (273 m)

Population (2020)
  - Total: 598
  - Density: 19.1/sq mi (7.38/km^{2})
- Time zone: UTC-6 (Central (CST))
  - Summer (DST): UTC-5 (CDT)
- Area codes: 715 & 534
- FIPS code: 55-76100
- GNIS feature ID: 1584199

Spring Lake is a town in Pierce County, Wisconsin, United States. As of the 2020 census, the town population was 598. The unincorporated communities of Hatchville and Olivet are located partially in the town.

== Geography ==
According to the United States Census Bureau, the town has a total area of 31.3 square miles (81.0 km^{2}), all land.

== Demographics ==
As of the census of 2000, there were 550 people, 191 households, and 157 families residing in the town. The population density was 17.6 people per square mile (6.8/km^{2}). There were 197 housing units at an average density of 6.3 per square mile (2.4/km^{2}). The racial makeup of the town was 98.91% White, 0.18% Native American, 0.18% Asian, and 0.73% from two or more races. Hispanic or Latino of any race were 0.18% of the population.

There were 191 households, out of which 40.3% had children under the age of 18 living with them, 72.8% were married couples living together, 6.3% had a female householder with no husband present, and 17.3% were non-families. 14.1% of all households were made up of individuals, and 5.2% had someone living alone who was 65 years of age or older. The average household size was 2.88 and the average family size was 3.15.

In the town, the population was spread out, with 28.5% under the age of 18, 6.5% from 18 to 24, 29.6% from 25 to 44, 24.4% from 45 to 64, and 10.9% who were 65 years of age or older. The median age was 37 years. For every 100 females, there were 113.2 males. For every 100 females age 18 and over, there were 104.7 males.

The median income for a household in the town was $48,611, and the median income for a family was $50,750. Males had a median income of $34,844 versus $20,625 for females. The per capita income for the town was $24,661. About 1.3% of families and 1.0% of the population were below the poverty line, including 2.1% of those under age 18 and none of those age 65 or over.
