= St. Croix County, Wisconsin =

County in Wisconsin, United States

- County
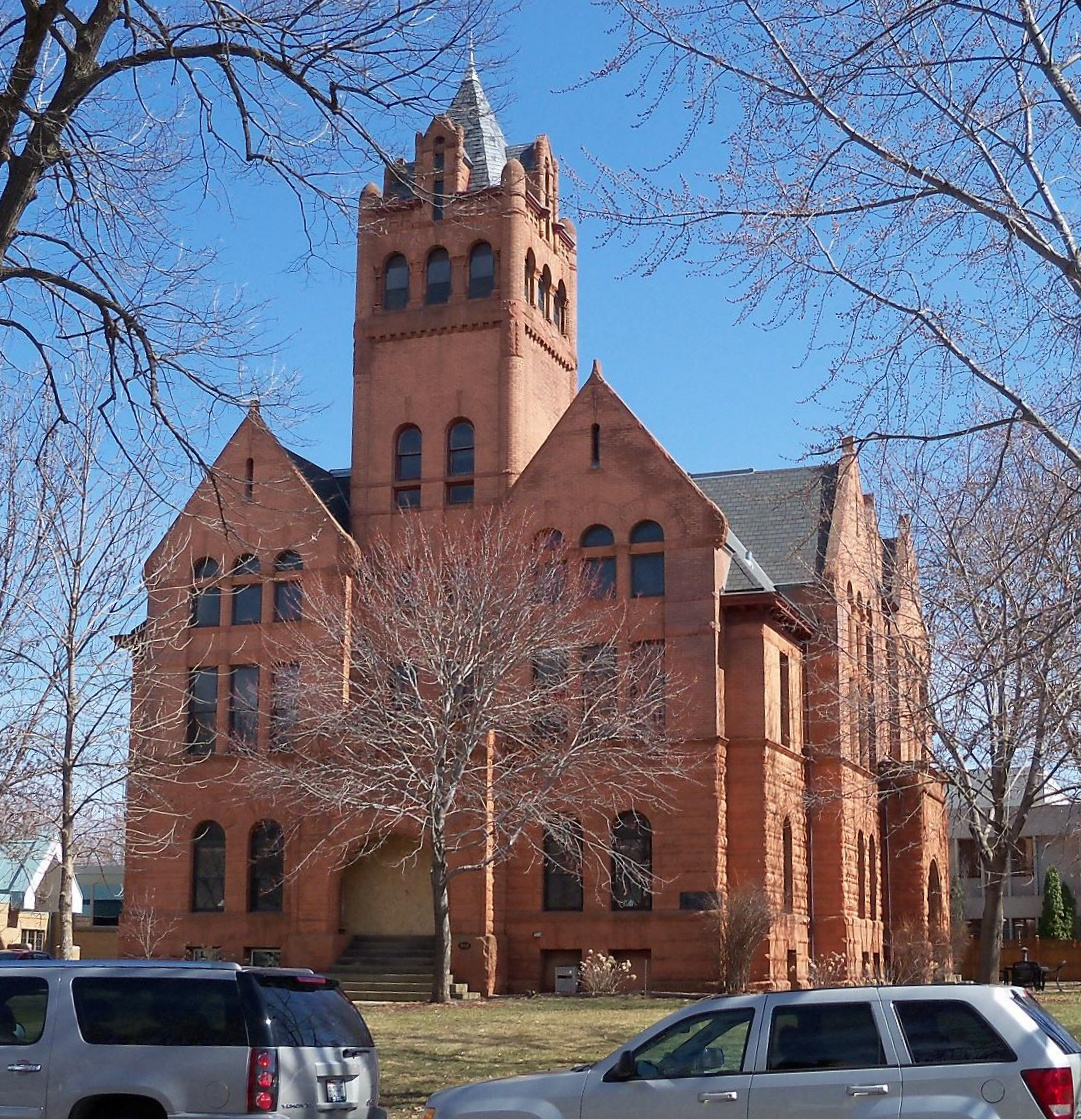
- Old St. Croix County Courthouse

- Location within the U.S. state of Wisconsin
- Coordinates: 45°02′N 92°27′W
- Country: United States
- State: Wisconsin
- Founded: 1849
- Named for: St. Croix River
- Seat: Hudson
- Largest city: Hudson

Area
  - Total: 736 sq mi (1,910 km^{2})
  - Land: 722 sq mi (1,870 km^{2})
  - Water: 13 sq mi (34 km^{2}) 1.8%

Population (2020)
  - Total: 93,536
  - Estimate (2025): 97,954 ▲
  - Density: 129.5/sq mi (50.0/km^{2})
- Time zone: UTC−6 (Central)
  - Summer (DST): UTC−5 (CDT)
- Congressional district: 7th
- Website: www.sccwi.gov

St. Croix County is a county in the U.S. state of Wisconsin. As of the 2020 census, the population was 93,536. Its county seat is Hudson. The county was created in 1840 (then in the Wisconsin Territory) and organized in 1849. St. Croix County is part of the Minneapolis–St. Paul–Bloomington, MN–WI Metropolitan Statistical Area. Between 2000 and 2010, it was Wisconsin's fastest-growing county. Its growth has continued since 2010 in part due to people moving out of the central Minneapolis–Saint Paul counties and into St. Croix County.

Soils of St. Croix County

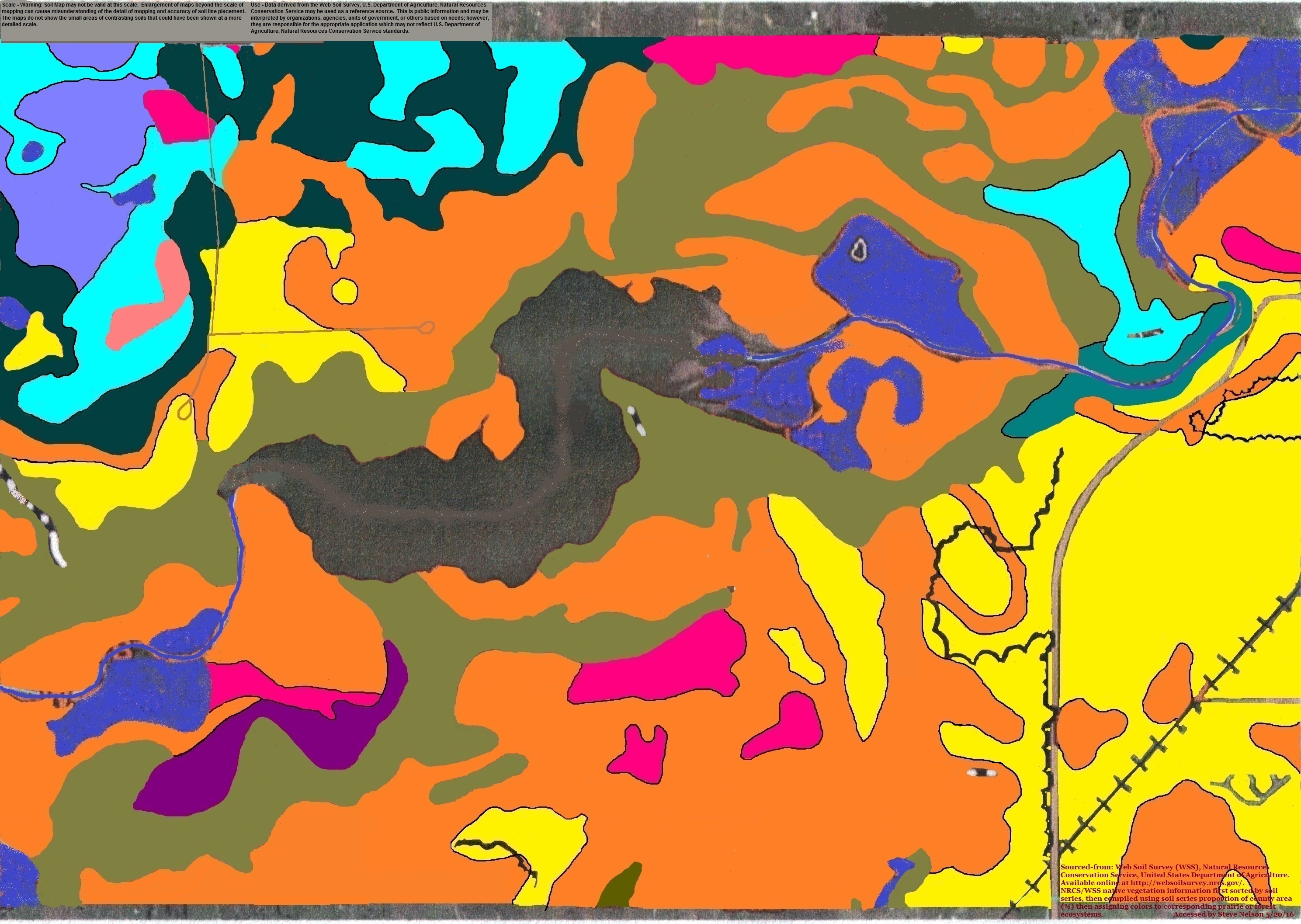
Soils of Willow River State Park area

== History ==
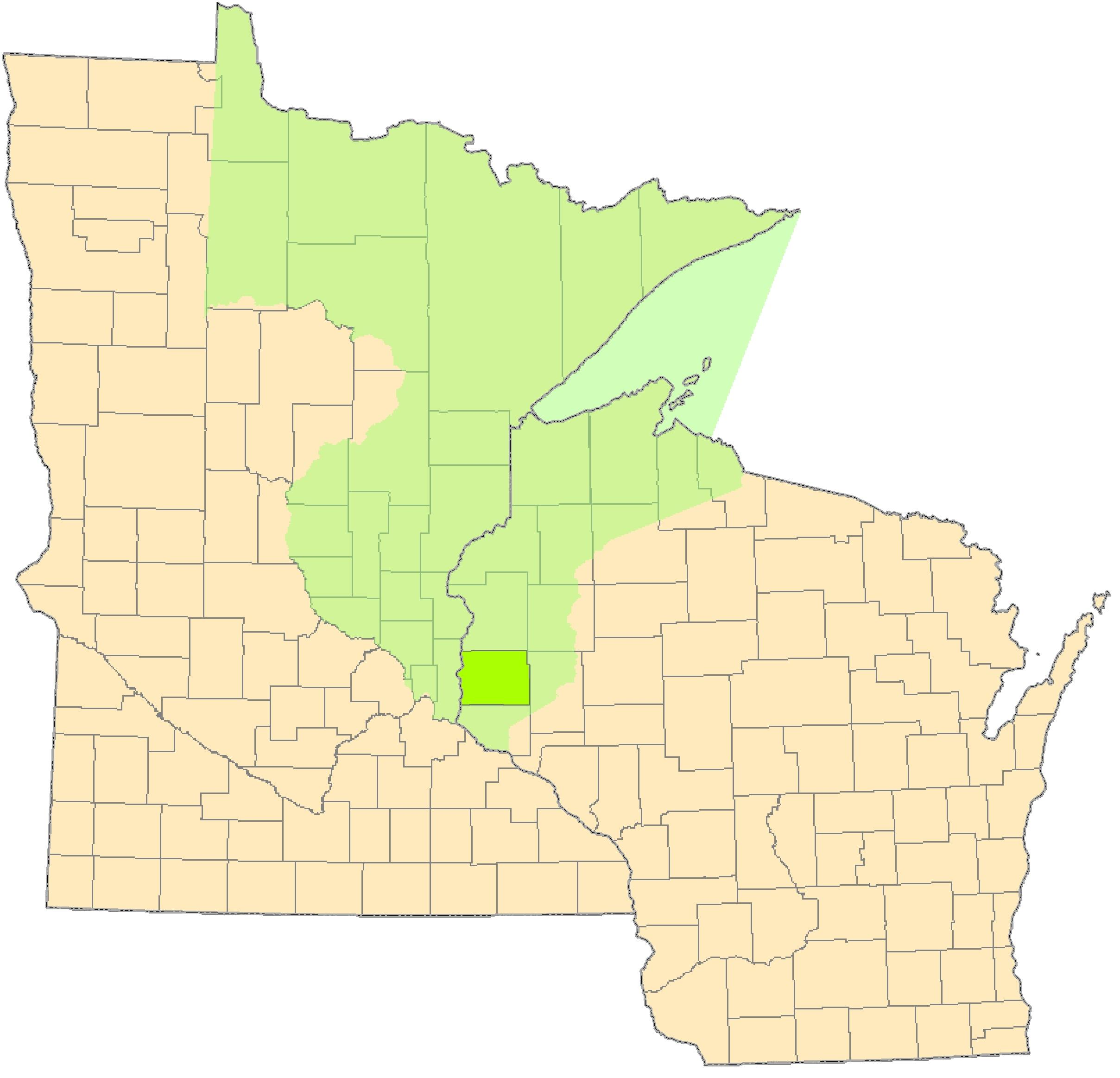
St. Croix County of 1840 and today

St. Croix County was created on August 3, 1840, by the legislature of the Wisconsin Territory. It was named after the river on its western border. Sources vary on the name's origin. The St. Croix River may have been named after an explorer named St. Croix who drowned at the river's mouth in the late 17th century. According to another account, Father Hennepin gave this region the French name St^{e} Croix (Holy Cross) because of the burial markers at the river's mouth.

La Pointe County (now extinct, see Bayfield County) was created from the northern portions of Wisconsin Territory's St. Croix County on February 19, 1845. When Wisconsin was admitted into the union as a state on May 29, 1848, the territorial St. Croix County was further divided, with the territory from the Mississippi River to the Minnesota border remaining de facto Wisconsin Territory until on March 3, 1849, it and unorganized federal territory north of Iowa were used in the creation of the Minnesota Territory. Itasca, Washington, Ramsey and Benton Counties were created by the Minnesota Territory on October 27, 1849, from the de facto Wisconsin Territory that had been separated from the Wisconsin Territory's La Pointe County.

The part of St. Croix County allocated to Wisconsin became the parental county to Pierce and Polk Counties, and formed significant portions of Dunn, Barron, Washburn and Burnett Counties.

On June 12, 1899, a deadly F5 tornado struck New Richmond. The tornado's damage path was 400 yards (370 m) wide and 46 miles (74 km) long. The tornado formed on the banks of the St. Croix River, south of Hudson. Moving to the northeast across St. Croix County, the tornado passed through the villages of Burkhardt and Boardman before striking New Richmond head on, leveling the entire business district and half the town's residences. The storm continued northeast, narrowly missing the town of Deer Park before crossing into Polk County, where it narrowly missed the towns of Clear Lake, Richardson, and Clayton. Once the tornado passed into Barron County, it struck the village of Arland before breaking up southwest of Barron. The tornado killed 117 people (four at Boardman, two in Polk County, and the rest at New Richmond), including at least 20 people who died from their injuries in the days after the storm. Largely thanks to state aid and donations, most of the town was rebuilt by the next winter. The tornado was the deadliest ever recorded in Wisconsin and the 9th deadliest tornado in U.S. history.

== Geography ==
According to the U.S. Census Bureau, the county has an area of 736 square miles (1,910 km^{2}), of which 722 square miles (1,870 km^{2}) is land and 13 square miles (34 km^{2}) (1.8%) is water.

=== Major highways ===
- Interstate 94
- US Highway 12
- US Highway 63
- Wisconsin Highway 29
- Wisconsin Highway 35
- Wisconsin Highway 46
- Wisconsin Highway 64
- Wisconsin Highway 65
- Wisconsin Highway 128
- Wisconsin Highway 170
- List of county roads

=== Railroads ===
- Canadian National
- Union Pacific

=== Airport ===
New Richmond Regional Airport (KRNH) serves the county and surrounding communities.

=== National protected area ===
- Saint Croix National Scenic Riverway (part)

=== Adjacent counties ===
- Polk County – north
- Barron County – northeast
- Dunn County – east
- Pierce County – south
- Washington County, Minnesota – west

== Demographics ==
Historical population
Census	Pop.	Note	%±
1840	809		—
1850	624		−22.9%
1860	5,392		764.1%
1870	11,035		104.7%
1880	18,956		71.8%
1890	23,139		22.1%
1900	26,830		16.0%
1910	25,910		−3.4%
1920	26,106		0.8%
1930	25,455		−2.5%
1940	24,842		−2.4%
1950	25,905		4.3%
1960	29,164		12.6%
1970	34,354		17.8%
1980	43,262		25.9%
1990	50,251		16.2%
2000	63,155		25.7%
2010	84,345		33.6%
2020	93,536		10.9%
2025 (est.)	97,954	▲	4.7%
U.S. Decennial Census; 1790–1960 1900–1990; 1990–2000 2010–2020

=== Racial and ethnic composition ===
St. Croix County, Wisconsin – Racial and ethnic composition Note: the US Census treats Hispanic/Latino as an ethnic category. This table excludes Latinos from the racial categories and assigns them to a separate category. Hispanics/Latinos may be of any race.
Race / ethnicity (NH = Non-Hispanic)	Pop 1980	Pop 1990	Pop 2000	Pop 2010	Pop 2020	% 1980	% 1990	% 2000	% 2010	% 2020
White alone (NH)	42,891	49,743	61,525	79,895	85,457	99.14%	98.99%	97.42%	94.72%	91.36%
Black or African American alone (NH)	22	44	176	542	635	0.05%	0.09%	0.28%	0.64%	0.68%
Native American or Alaska Native alone (NH)	85	120	141	284	233	0.20%	0.24%	0.22%	0.34%	0.25%
Asian alone (NH)	76	148	386	894	984	0.18%	0.29%	0.61%	1.06%	1.05%
Native Hawaiian or Pacific Islander alone (NH)	x	x	13	16	33	x	x	0.02%	0.02%	0.04%
Other race alone (NH)	50	4	32	39	309	0.12%	0.01%	0.05%	0.05%	0.33%
Mixed race or Multiracial (NH)	x	x	399	983	3,206	x	x	0.63%	1.17%	3.43%
Hispanic or Latino (any race)	138	192	483	1,692	2,679	0.32%	0.38%	0.76%	2.01%	2.86%
Total	43,262	50,251	63,155	84,345	93,536	100.00%	100.00%	100.00%	100.00%	100.00%

=== 2020 census ===
As of the 2020 census, the county had a population of 93,536 and a median age of 39.9 years. 24.8% of residents were under the age of 18 and 15.4% of residents were 65 years of age or older. For every 100 females there were 100.4 males, and for every 100 females age 18 and over there were 99.0 males age 18 and over.

The population density was 129.5 people per square mile (50.0 people/km^{2}). There were 37,369 housing units at an average density of 51.7 units per square mile (20.0 units/km^{2}).

The racial makeup of the county was 92.2% White, 0.7% Black or African American, 0.3% American Indian and Alaska Native, 1.1% Asian, <0.1% Native Hawaiian and Pacific Islander, 1.1% from some other race, and 4.5% from two or more races. Hispanic or Latino residents of any race comprised 2.9% of the population.

36.0% of residents lived in urban areas, while 64.0% lived in rural areas.

There were 35,892 households in the county, of which 33.2% had children under the age of 18 living in them. Of all households, 57.4% were married-couple households, 15.7% were households with a male householder and no spouse or partner present, and 19.1% were households with a female householder and no spouse or partner present. About 22.9% of all households were made up of individuals and 9.4% had someone living alone who was 65 years of age or older.

There were 37,369 housing units, of which 4.0% were vacant. Among occupied housing units, 77.4% were owner-occupied and 22.6% were renter-occupied. The homeowner vacancy rate was 0.6% and the rental vacancy rate was 3.2%.

2000 Census Age Pyramid for St. Croix County.

=== 2000 census ===
As of the census of 2000, there were 63,155 people, 23,410 households, and 16,948 families residing in the county. The population density was 88 people per square mile (34 people/km^{2}). There were 24,265 housing units at an average density of 34 units per square mile (13 units/km^{2}). The racial makeup of the county was 97.85% White, 0.28% Black or African American, 0.25% Native American, 0.62% Asian, 0.02% Pacific Islander, 0.22% from other races, and 0.76% from two or more races. 0.76% of the population were Hispanic or Latino of any race. 34.4% were of German, 19.3% Norwegian, 8.2% Irish and 5.4% Swedish ancestry.

There were 23,410 households, out of which 38.00% had children under the age of 18 living with them, 61.60% were married couples living together, and 27.60% were non-families. 21.20% of all households were made up of individuals, and 7.30% had someone living alone who was 65 years of age or older. The average household size was 2.66 and the average family size was 3.12.

In the county, the population was spread out, with 27.90% under the age of 18, 8.20% from 18 to 24, 32.20% from 25 to 44, 21.90% from 45 to 64, and 9.90% who were 65 years of age or older. The median age was 35 years. For every 100 females there were 100.20 males. For every 100 females age 18 and over, there were 98.50 males.

In 2017, there were 988 births, giving a general fertility rate of 59.0 births per 1000 women aged 15–44, the 25th lowest rate out of all 72 Wisconsin counties.

== Communities ==
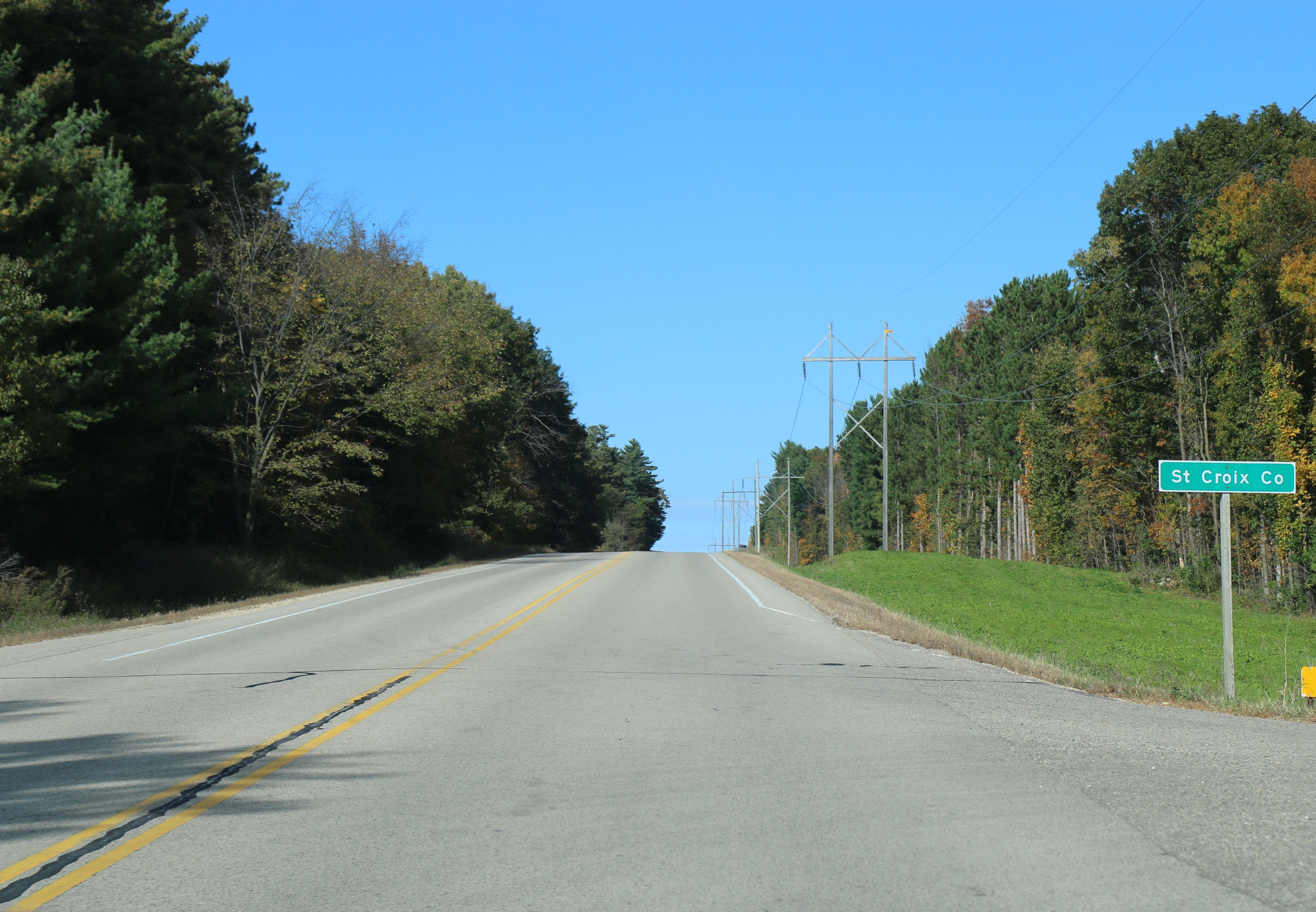
The sign for St. Croix County on US63

=== Cities ===
- Glenwood City
- Hudson (county seat)
- New Richmond
- River Falls (mostly in Pierce County)

=== Villages ===
- Baldwin
- Deer Park
- Hammond
- North Hudson
- Roberts
- Somerset
- Spring Valley (mostly in Pierce County)
- Star Prairie
- Wilson
- Woodville

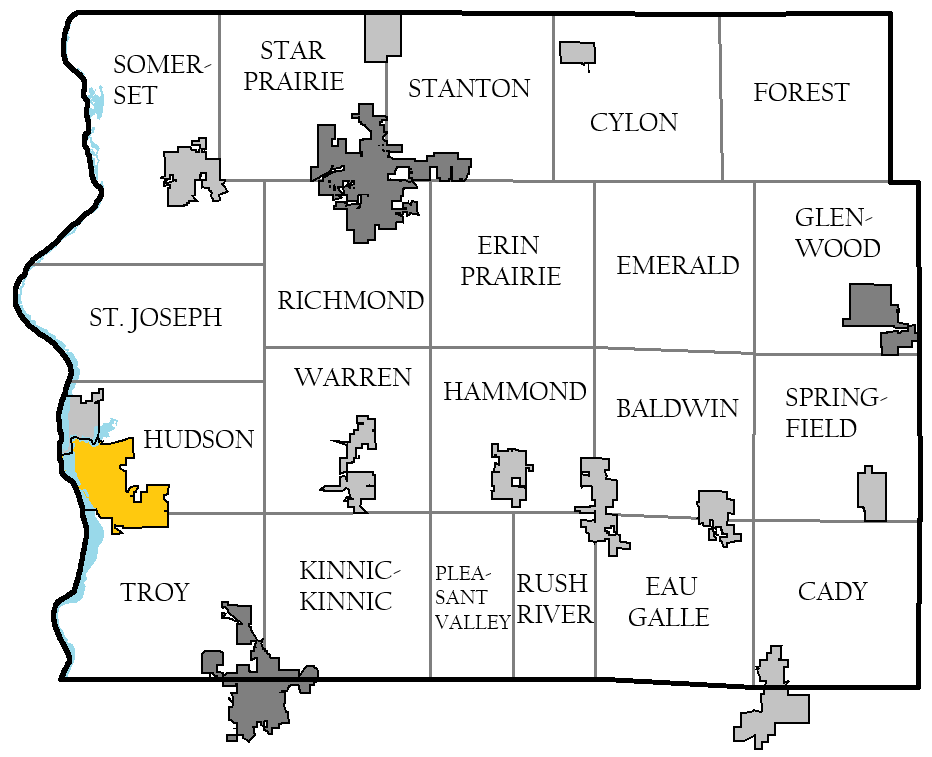
Towns of St. Croix County

=== Towns ===
- Baldwin
- Cady
- Cylon
- Eau Galle
- Emerald
- Erin Prairie
- Forest
- Glenwood
- Hammond
- Hudson
- Kinnickinnic
- Pleasant Valley
- Richmond
- Rush River
- Somerset
- Springfield
- St. Joseph
- Stanton
- Star Prairie
- Troy
- Warren

=== Census-designated places ===
- Emerald
- Houlton

=== Unincorporated communities ===
- Boardman
- Burkhardt
- Burkhardt Station
- Centerville
- Cylon
- Dahl
- Erin Corner
- Forest
- Glover
- Hatchville (partial)
- Hersey
- Huntington
- Jewett
- Johannesburg
- Northline
- Palmer
- Sono Junction
- Stanton
- Viking (partial)
- Wildwood

== Politics ==
Since 2000, St. Croix County has voted consistently Republican, and starting in 2012 it has done so by double-digit margins. Prior to this, it was a swing county.

United States presidential election results for St. Croix County, Wisconsin
Year	Republican		Democratic		Third party(ies)	
Year	No.	%	No.	%	No.	%
1892	2,467	47.04%	2,220	42.33%	557	10.62%
1896	3,462	56.38%	2,475	40.31%	203	3.31%
1900	3,368	58.98%	2,076	36.36%	266	4.66%
1904	3,898	68.33%	1,569	27.50%	238	4.17%
1908	3,228	62.29%	1,773	34.21%	181	3.49%
1912	1,728	37.18%	1,806	38.86%	1,114	23.97%
1916	2,731	51.09%	2,352	44.00%	262	4.90%
1920	5,601	73.34%	1,638	21.45%	398	5.21%
1924	3,600	39.68%	718	7.91%	4,755	52.41%
1928	6,855	62.17%	4,083	37.03%	88	0.80%
1932	4,059	37.94%	6,374	59.58%	265	2.48%
1936	4,316	38.47%	4,679	41.71%	2,223	19.82%
1940	6,857	57.74%	4,898	41.24%	121	1.02%
1944	5,660	53.01%	4,930	46.17%	88	0.82%
1948	4,326	40.43%	6,173	57.69%	202	1.89%
1952	7,607	59.78%	5,094	40.03%	25	0.20%
1956	6,956	55.72%	5,499	44.05%	29	0.23%
1960	7,113	52.77%	6,341	47.05%	24	0.18%
1964	4,565	33.92%	8,864	65.86%	29	0.22%
1968	6,595	46.61%	6,807	48.11%	746	5.27%
1972	8,553	52.50%	7,488	45.96%	250	1.53%
1976	7,685	41.16%	10,601	56.77%	386	2.07%
1980	9,265	42.56%	10,203	46.87%	2,299	10.56%
1984	11,367	52.54%	10,127	46.81%	141	0.65%
1988	9,960	46.25%	11,392	52.90%	181	0.84%
1992	8,114	31.60%	10,281	40.04%	7,281	28.36%
1996	8,253	35.55%	11,384	49.04%	3,576	15.41%
2000	15,240	50.88%	13,077	43.66%	1,637	5.47%
2004	22,679	54.21%	18,784	44.90%	372	0.89%
2008	22,837	50.95%	21,177	47.25%	807	1.80%
2012	25,503	55.17%	19,910	43.07%	812	1.76%
2016	26,222	55.19%	17,482	36.80%	3,804	8.01%
2020	32,199	56.78%	23,190	40.89%	1,318	2.32%
2024	35,537	58.60%	23,870	39.36%	1,235	2.04%

== See also ==
- National Register of Historic Places listings in St. Croix County, Wisconsin
- Citizens for the St. Croix Valley political organization
