= Eau Galle, St. Croix County, Wisconsin =

Eau Galle, Wisconsin
- Town
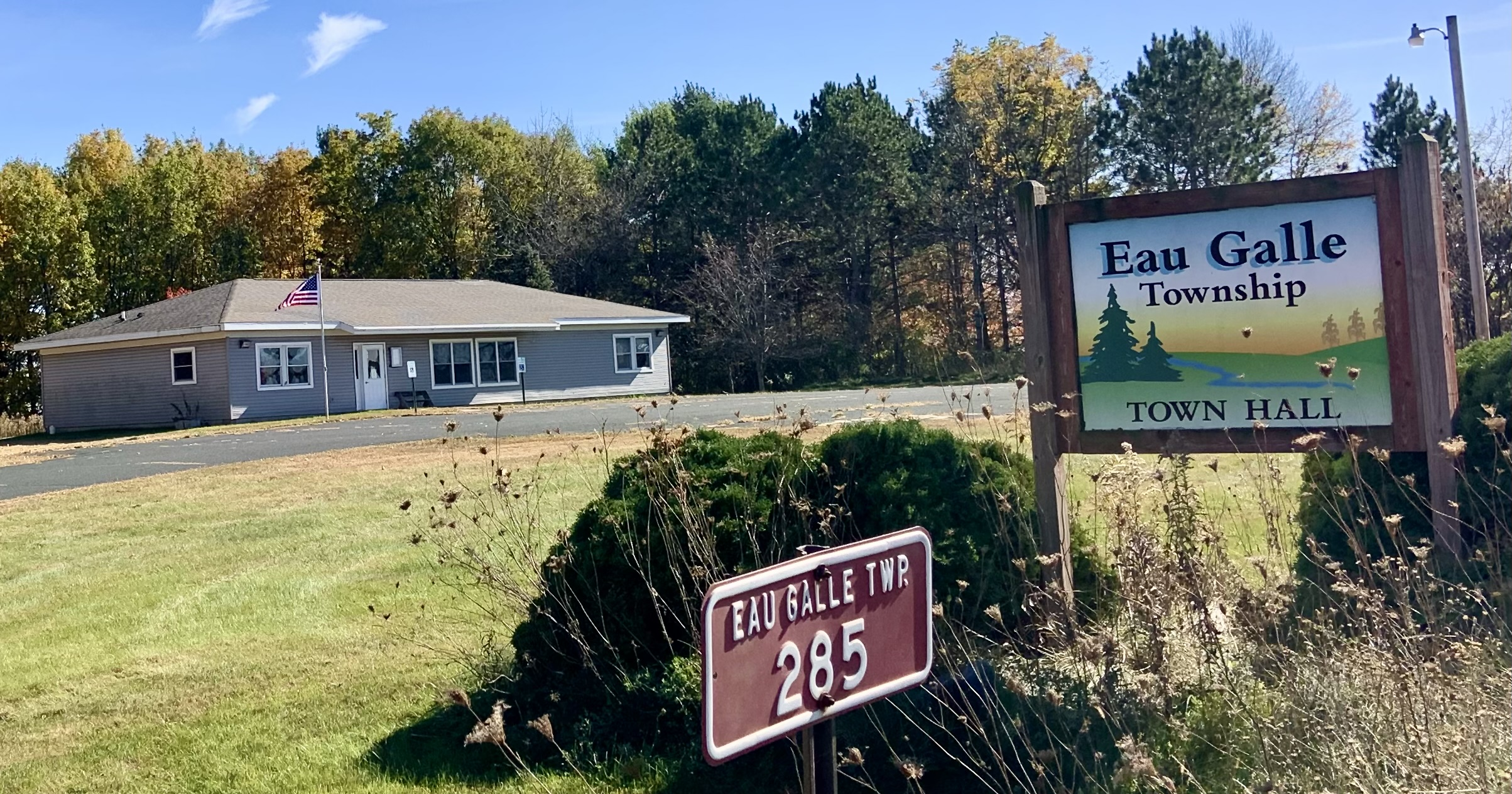
- Town hall

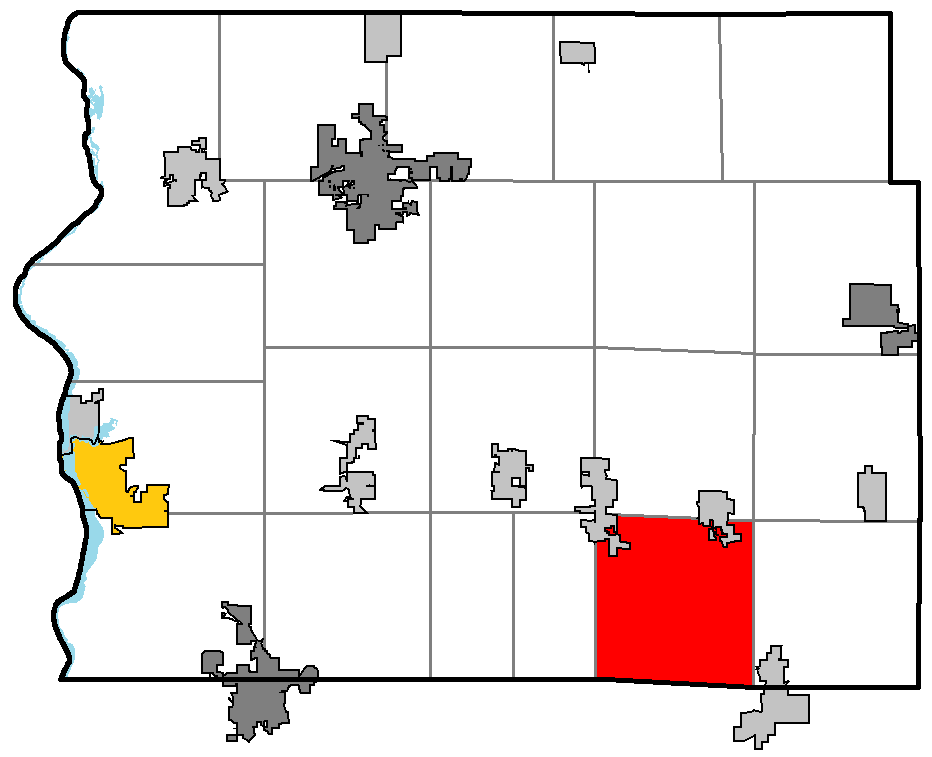
- Location of Eau Galle, within St. Croix County

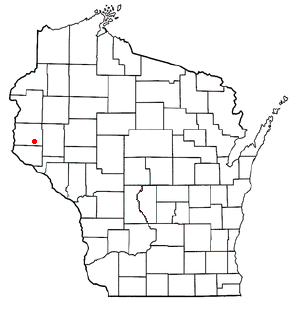
- Location of Eau Galle, St. Croix County, Wisconsin
- Coordinates: 44°53′53″N 92°18′33″W
- Country: United States
- State: Wisconsin
- County: St. Croix

Area
  - Total: 33.8 sq mi (87.5 km^{2})
  - Land: 33.6 sq mi (87.0 km^{2})
  - Water: 0.19 sq mi (0.5 km^{2})
- Elevation: 1,243 ft (379 m)

Population (2020)
  - Total: 1,253
  - Density: 37.3/sq mi (14.4/km^{2})
- Time zone: UTC-6 (Central (CST))
  - Summer (DST): UTC-5 (CDT)
- Area codes: 715 & 534
- FIPS code: 55-22400
- GNIS feature ID: 1583126
- Website: townofeaugallewi.gov

Eau Galle is a town in St. Croix County, Wisconsin, United States. At the 2020 census, the population was 1,253. The unincorporated community of Wildwood is located in the town. The unincorporated community of Viking is also partially located in the town.

It is named after the Eau Galle River, which runs through the town's eastern margin.

== Geography ==
According to the United States Census Bureau, the town has a total area of 33.8 square miles (87.5 km^{2}), of which 33.6 square miles (87.0 km^{2}) is land and 0.2 square mile (0.5 km^{2}) (0.56%) is water.

== Demographics ==
Historical population
Census	Pop.	Note	%±
2010	1,139		—
2020	1,253		10.0%

As of the census of 2000, there were 882 people, 307 households, and 251 families residing in the town. The population density was 26.3 inhabitants per square mile (10.2/km^{2}). There were 320 housing units at an average density of 9.5 per square mile (3.7/km^{2}). The racial makeup of the town was 97.17% White, 0.79% Asian, 1.59% from other races, and 0.45% from two or more races. Hispanic or Latino of any race were 0.91% of the population.

There were 307 households, out of which 39.1% had children under the age of 18 living with them, 74.3% were married couples living together, 3.9% had a female householder with no husband present, and 18.2% were non-families. 15.6% of all households were made up of individuals, and 6.2% had someone living alone who was 65 years of age or older. The average household size was 2.87 and the average family size was 3.18.

In the town, the population was spread out, with 28.9% under the age of 18, 5.4% from 18 to 24, 29.1% from 25 to 44, 25.7% from 45 to 64, and 10.8% who were 65 years of age or older. The median age was 38 years. For every 100 females, there were 108.5 males. For every 100 females age 18 and over, there were 111.8 males.

The median income for a household in the town was $56,250, and the median income for a family was $60,278. Males had a median income of $34,500 versus $29,000 for females. The per capita income for the town was $20,787. About 2.3% of families and 2.6% of the population were below the poverty line, including none of those under age 18 and 6.4% of those age 65 or over.
