= Stanton, St. Croix County, Wisconsin =

Stanton, Wisconsin
- Town
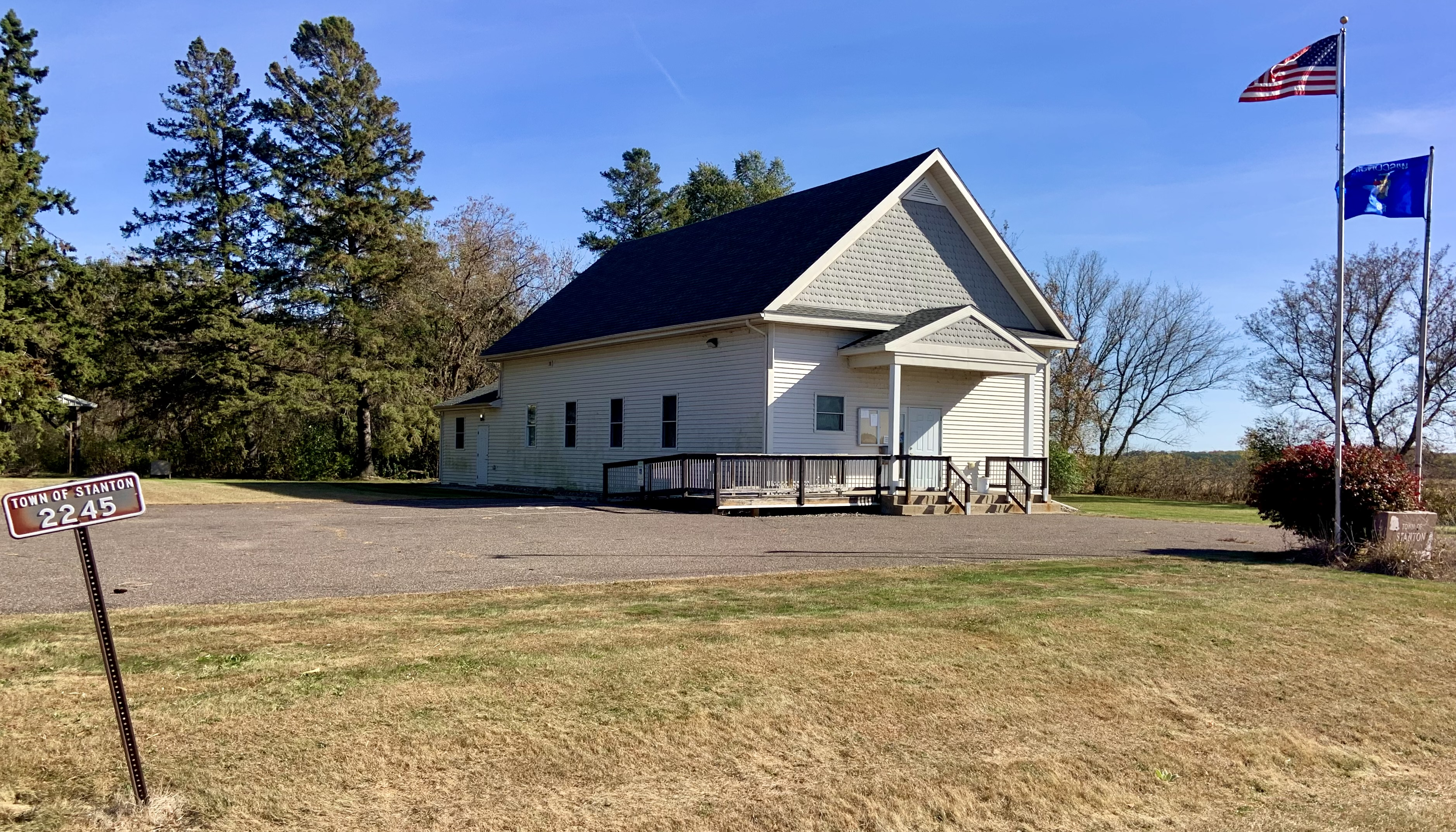
- Town hall

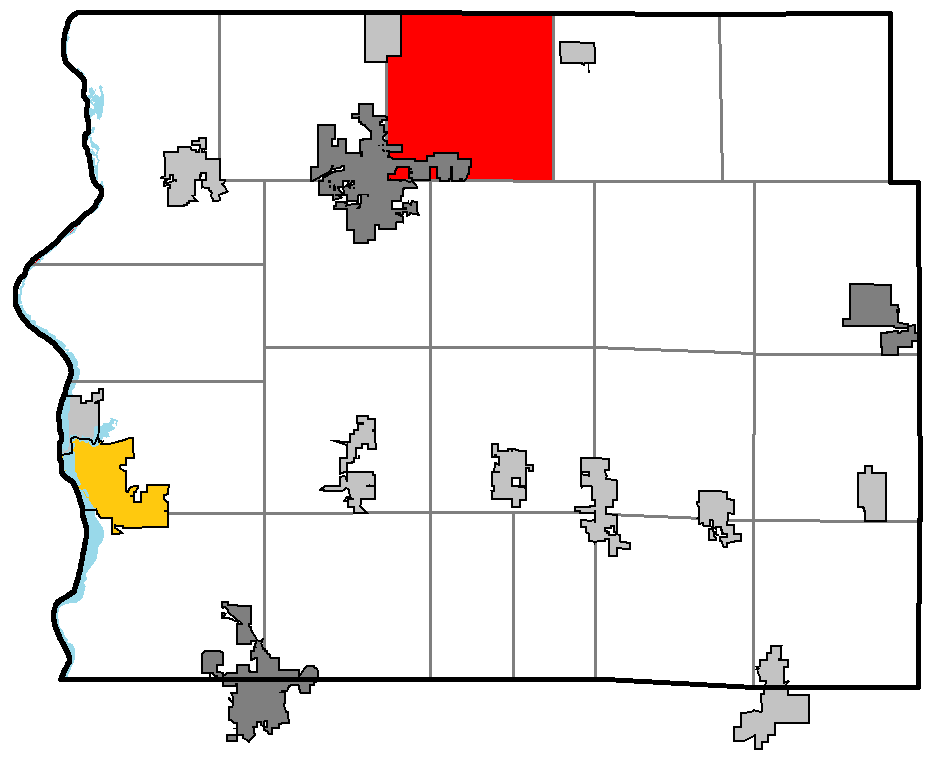
- Location of Stanton, within St. Croix County

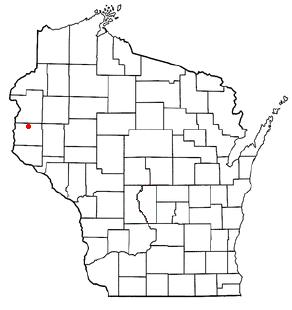
- Location of Stanton, St. Croix County, Wisconsin
- Coordinates: 45°9′22″N 92°29′15″W
- Country: United States
- State: Wisconsin
- County: St. Croix

Area
  - Total: 35.0 sq mi (90.7 km^{2})
  - Land: 34.1 sq mi (88.2 km^{2})
  - Water: 1.0 sq mi (2.6 km^{2})
- Elevation: 1,060 ft (323 m)

Population (2020)
  - Total: 907
  - Density: 26.6/sq mi (10.3/km^{2})
- Time zone: UTC-6 (Central (CST))
  - Summer (DST): UTC-5 (CDT)
- Area codes: 715 & 534
- FIPS code: 55-76675
- GNIS feature ID: 1584212
- Website: https://townofstantonwi.com/

Stanton is a town in St. Croix County, Wisconsin, United States. The population was 907 at the 2020 census. The unincorporated community of Stanton is located in the town. The Stanton Town Hall is located at 2245 County Road T Deer Park.

== History ==
The town was named for Edwin M. Stanton, the United States Secretary of War under Abraham Lincoln.

== Geography ==
According to the United States Census Bureau, the town has a total area of 35.0 square miles (90.8 km^{2}), of which 34.0 square miles (88.2 km^{2}) is land and 1.0 square mile (2.6 km^{2} (2.83%) is water.

== Demographics ==
Historical population
Census	Pop.	Note	%±
2000	1,003		—
2010	900		−10.3%
2020	907		0.8%

As of the census of 2000, there were 1,003 people, 352 households, and 285 families residing in the town. The population density was 29.5 inhabitants per square mile (11.4/km^{2}). There were 363 housing units at an average density of 10.7 per square mile (4.1/km^{2}). The racial makeup of the town was 97.51% White, 0.20% Native American, 0.50% Asian, 0.40% Pacific Islander, 0.20% from other races, and 1.20% from two or more races. Hispanic or Latino of any race were 1.40% of the population.

There were 352 households, out of which 38.9% had children under the age of 18 living with them, 68.2% were married couples living together, 7.4% had a female householder with no husband present, and 19.0% were non-families. 14.2% of all households were made up of individuals, and 3.4% had someone living alone who was 65 years of age or older. The average household size was 2.85 and the average family size was 3.15.

In the town, the population was spread out, with 28.2% under the age of 18, 8.8% from 18 to 24, 29.5% from 25 to 44, 24.9% from 45 to 64, and 8.6% who were 65 years of age or older. The median age was 36 years. For every 100 females, there were 103.0 males. For every 100 females age 18 and over, there were 110.5 males.

The median income for a household in the town was $52,604, and the median income for a family was $54,896. Males had a median income of $39,375 versus $26,908 for females. The per capita income for the town was $20,808. About 2.8% of families and 4.2% of the population were below the poverty line, including 7.1% of those under age 18 and 3.2% of those age 65 or over.
