= Gilman, Pierce County, Wisconsin =

Town in Pierce County, Wisconsin

Gilman, Wisconsin
- Town
- Town of Gilman
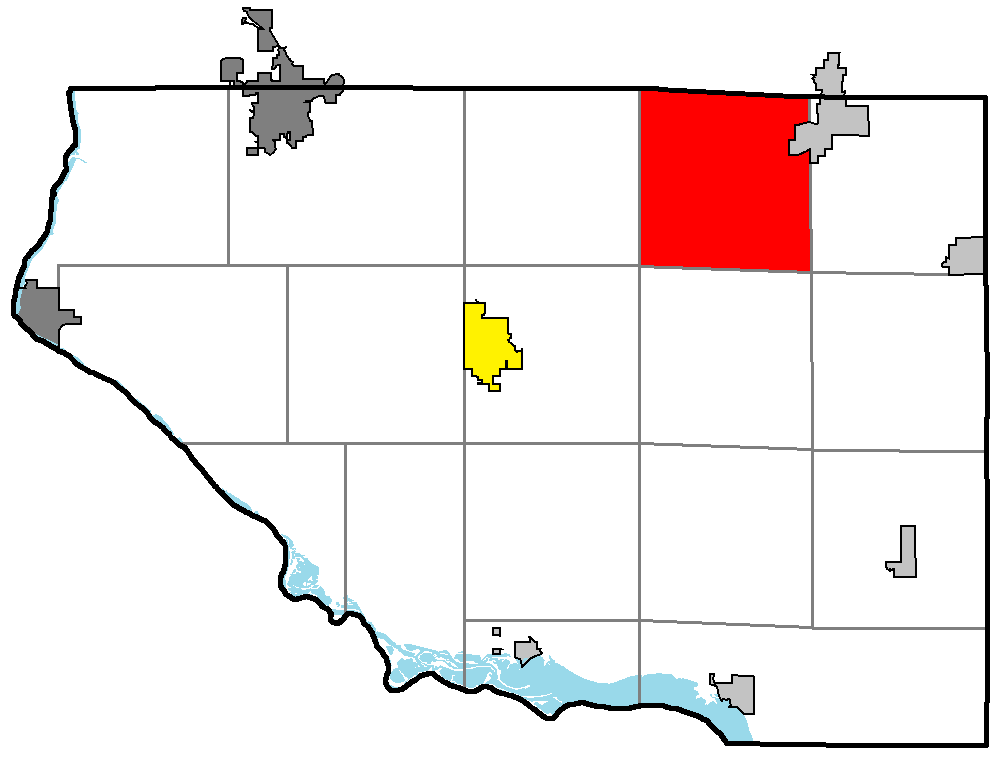
- Location of Gilman, within Pierce County

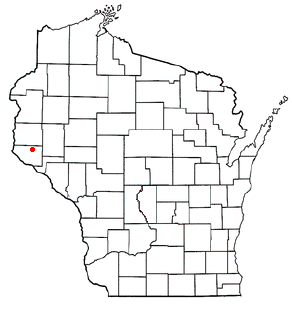
- Coordinates: 44°48′34″N 92°18′28″W
- Country: United States
- State: Wisconsin
- County: Pierce

Area
  - Total: 33.87 sq mi (87.7 km^{2})
  - Land: 33.80 sq mi (87.5 km^{2})
  - Water: 0.07 sq mi (0.18 km^{2})

Population (2020)
  - Total: 1,006
  - Density: 29.76/sq mi (11.49/km^{2})
- Time zone: UTC-6 (Central (CST))
  - Summer (DST): UTC-5 (CDT)
- Area code(s): 715 and 534
- GNIS feature ID: 1583275

Gilman /ˈɡɪlmən/ GHIL-mən) is a town in Pierce County, Wisconsin, United States. The population was 1,006 as of the 2020 census. The unincorporated communities of Olivet and Viking are partially located in the town.

== History ==
The town was organized in 1870 as "Deerfield." It was subsequently renamed after B.F. Gilman, the first settler.

== Geography ==
According to the United States Census Bureau, the town has a total area of 33.8 square miles (87.6 km^{2}), all land.

== Demographics ==
As of the census of 2000, there were 772 people, 283 households, and 228 families residing in the town. The population density was 22.8 inhabitants per square mile (8.8/km^{2}). There were 289 housing units at an average density of 8.5 per square mile (3.3/km^{2}). The racial makeup of the town was 98.06% White, 0.39% African American, 0.26% Native American, 0.13% from other races, and 1.17% from two or more races. Hispanic or Latino of any race were 0.39% of the population.

There were 283 households, out of which 33.6% had children under the age of 18 living with them, 72.8% were married couples living together, 2.5% had a female householder with no husband present, and 19.4% were non-families. 17.0% of all households were made up of individuals, and 7.1% had someone living alone who was 65 years of age or older. The average household size was 2.73 and the average family size was 3.08.

In the town, the population was spread out, with 26.2% under the age of 18, 7.8% from 18 to 24, 31.2% from 25 to 44, 24.2% from 45 to 64, and 10.6% who were 65 years of age or older. The median age was 38 years. For every 100 females, there were 106.4 males. For every 100 females age 18 and over, there were 108.0 males.

The median income for a household in the town was $49,250, and the median income for a family was $54,375. Males had a median income of $35,769 versus $26,607 for females. The per capita income for the town was $18,502. About 2.6% of families and 3.7% of the population were below the poverty line, including 3.8% of those under age 18 and 2.4% of those age 65 or over.
