= Stanton (community), Wisconsin =

Stanton, Wisconsin
- Unincorporated community
- Location within Wisconsin Location within the United States
- Coordinates: 45°10′23″N 92°28′02″W
- Country: United States
- State: Wisconsin
- County: St. Croix
- Elevation: 1,050 ft (320 m)
- Time zone: UTC-6 (Central (CST))
  - Summer (DST): UTC-5 (CDT)
- Area codes: 715 & 534
- GNIS feature ID: 1581734

Stanton is an unincorporated community located in the town of Stanton, St. Croix County, Wisconsin, United States.

== History ==
A post office called Stanton was in operation from 1880 until 1913. The community was named for Edwin M. Stanton, 27th United States Secretary of War.
