= Cady, Wisconsin =

- Town
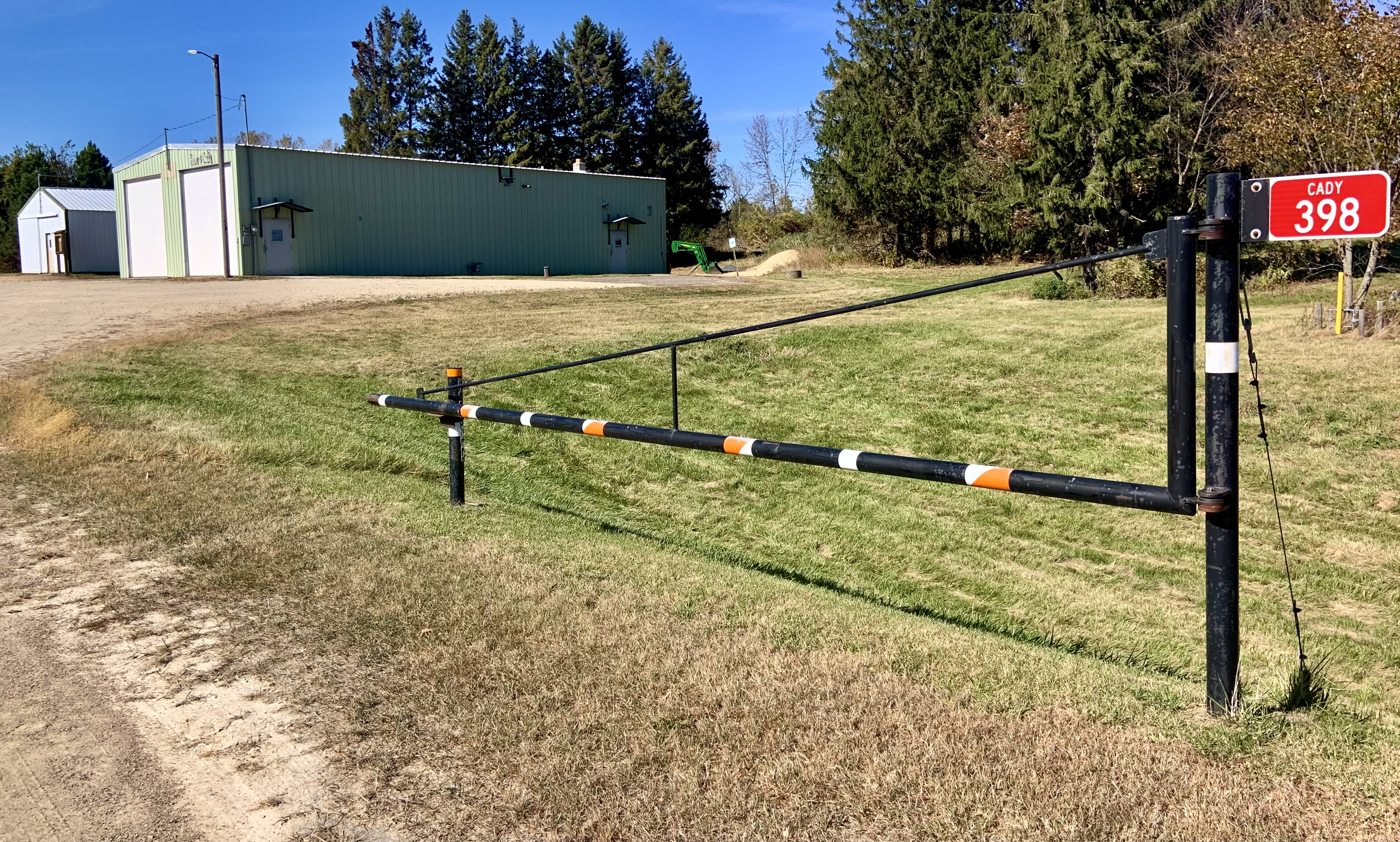
- Town hall

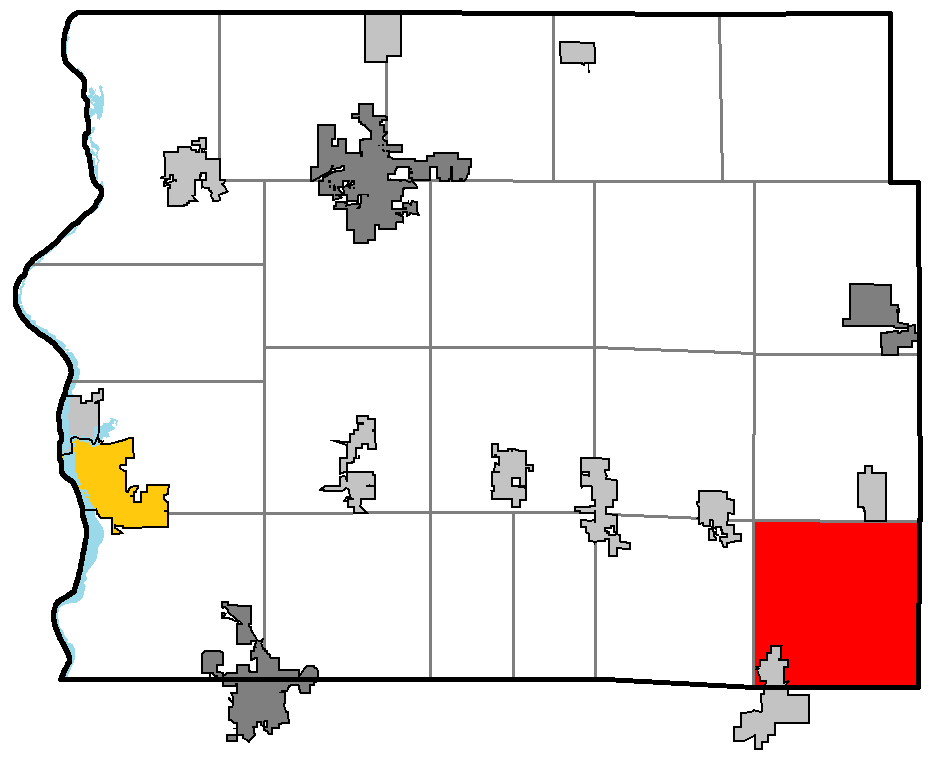
- Location of Cady, within St. Croix County

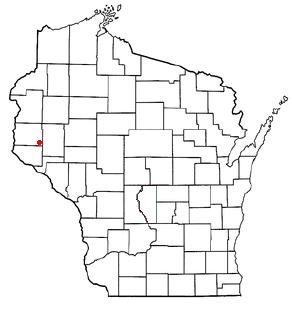
- Location of Cady, Wisconsin
- Coordinates: 44°54′17″N 92°12′6″W
- Country: United States
- State: Wisconsin
- County: St. Croix
- Established: 1870

Area
  - Total: 34.9 sq mi (90.3 km^{2})
  - Land: 34.5 sq mi (89.4 km^{2})
  - Water: 0.35 sq mi (0.9 km^{2})
- Elevation: 1,175 ft (358 m)

Population (United States Census, 2020)
  - Total: 880
  - Density: 20/sq mi (7.9/km^{2})
- Time zone: UTC-6 (Central (CST))
  - Summer (DST): UTC-5 (CDT)
- Area codes: 715 & 534
- FIPS code: 55-11775
- GNIS feature ID: 1582901
- Website: http://townofcady.com

Cady is a town in St. Croix County, Wisconsin, United States. The population was 880 at the 2020 census, up from 821 in the 2010 census and 710 at the 2000 census. The unincorporated community of Hatchville is located partially in the town.

== History ==
The town was named for Jacob Cady, who brought his family from Vermont circa 1850 to establish a saw mill in the area.

== Geography ==
According to the United States Census Bureau, the town has a total area of 34.9 square miles (90.3 km^{2}), of which 34.5 square miles (89.4 km^{2}) is land and 0.3 square mile (0.9 km^{2}) (1.00%) is water.

== Demographics ==
Historical population
| Census | Pop. | Note | %± |
|---|---|---|---|
| 2010 | 821 | | — |
| 2012 (est.) | 833 | | 1.5% |

As of the census of 2000, there were 710 people, 255 households, and 200 families residing in the town. The population density was 20.6 inhabitants per square mile (8.0/km^{2}). There were 264 housing units at an average density of 7.7 per square mile (3.0/km^{2}). The racial makeup of the town was 99.30% White, and 0.70% from two or more races. Hispanic or Latino of any race were 0.28% of the population.

There were 255 households, out of which 34.5% had children under the age of 18 living with them, 66.7% were married couples living together, 4.7% had a female householder with no husband present, and 21.2% were non-families. 16.5% of all households were made up of individuals, and 7.5% had someone living alone who was 65 years of age or older. The average household size was 2.78 and the average family size was 3.16.

In the town, the population was spread out, with 27.6% under the age of 18, 7.9% from 18 to 24, 28.7% from 25 to 44, 24.4% from 45 to 64, and 11.4% who were 65 years of age or older. The median age was 36 years. For every 100 females, there were 105.8 males. For every 100 females age 18 and over, there were 107.3 males.

The median income for a household in the town was $53,250, and the median income for a family was $56,979. Males had a median income of $35,341 versus $24,375 for females. The per capita income for the town was $20,634. About 0.5% of families and 2.4% of the population were below the poverty line, including 1.0% of those under age 18 and 5.6% of those age 65 or over.
