= Eau Galle (community), Dunn County, Wisconsin =

Eau Galle, Wisconsin
- Unincorporated community
- Location within Wisconsin Location within the United States
- Coordinates: 44°41′32″N 92°00′42″W
- Country: United States
- State: Wisconsin
- County: Dunn
- Town: Eau Galle
- Elevation: 761 ft (232 m)
- Time zone: UTC-6 (Central (CST))
  - Summer (DST): UTC-5 (CDT)
- ZIP code: 54737
- Area codes: 715 & 534
- GNIS feature ID: 1564409

Eau Galle is an unincorporated community located in the town of Eau Galle, in Dunn County, Wisconsin, United States. Eau Galle is 5 miles (8.0 km) northwest of Durand and has a post office with ZIP code 54737.

== Etymology ==
Although Eau Galle is sometimes said to mean "bitter water", the name is adapted from the original name for the Eau Galle River: (Rivière) au Galet, meaning "(river) with the gravel-bank".
