= Eau Galle River =

River in Wisconsin, United States

Coordinates: 44.6097°N 92.0008°W

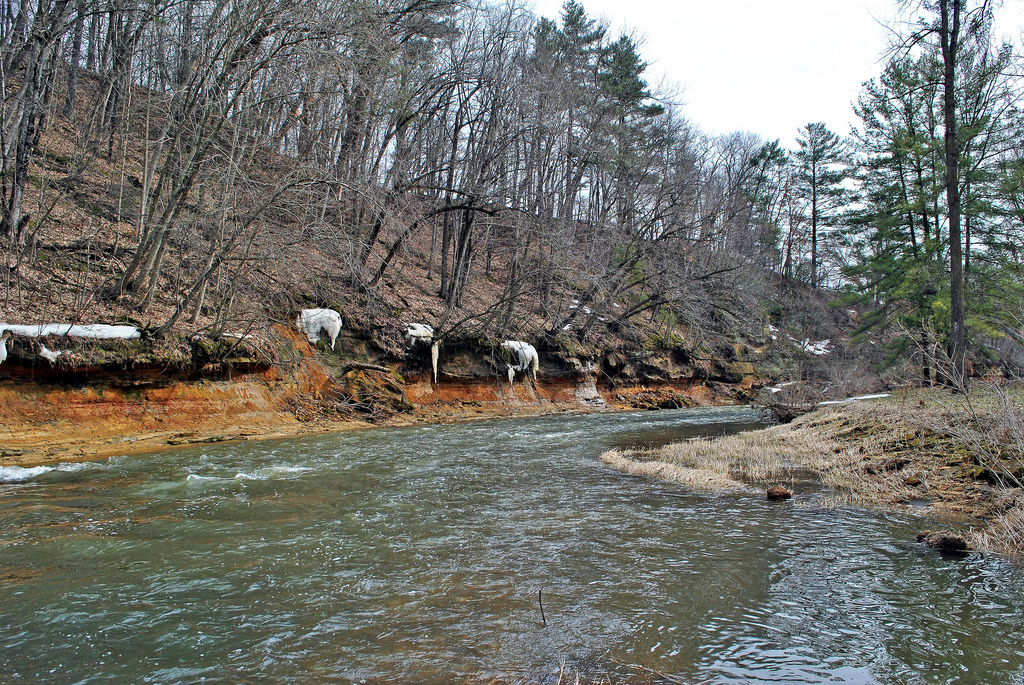
Eau Galle River, downstream from the dam in Eau Galle

The Eau Galle River is a tributary of the Chippewa River in western Wisconsin in the United States. It is about 35 mi (56 km) long. Via the Chippewa River, it is part of the Mississippi River watershed.

The Eau Galle River was named la Rivière au Galet, "river of the gravely/pebbly banks", by French explorers in the late 17th or early 18th century. Over time the spelling of galet changed to galle, thus causing a 1905 mistake in attribution by Henry Gannett, author of a book on place names in the US, who assumed that the river's name meant "bitter water" in French. There is a persistence of the galet pronunciation in spite of the spelling change to galle.

== Course ==
The Eau Galle River rises in southeastern St. Croix County and flows generally southeastwardly through northeastern Pierce, southwestern Dunn and northern Pepin Counties, past the communities of Spring Valley and Elmwood. It joins the Chippewa River in Pepin County, about 3 mi (5 km) southwest of Durand.

At Spring Valley, a U.S. Army Corps of Engineers dam causes the Eau Galle to form Eau Galle Lake, also known as Lake George.

== See also ==
- List of Wisconsin rivers
