= List of killings by law enforcement officers in the United States, June 2023 =

This is a list of people reported killed by non-military law enforcement officers in the United States in June 2023, whether in the line of duty or not, and regardless of reason or method. The listing documents the occurrence of a death, making no implications regarding wrongdoing or justification on the part of the person killed or officer involved. Killings are arranged by date of the incident that caused death. Different death dates, if known, are noted in the description. The table below lists 58 people.

== June 2023 ==
Date	Name (age) of deceased	Race	Location	Description
2023-06-24	Mark Peter (41)	White	Albuquerque, New Mexico	Officers were looking for a man that had multiple felony warrants at an AutoZone parking lot. Peter, an Albuquerque resident, went over to the nearby El Mezquite Market armed with a knife, which caused officers to do a foot pursuit into the store. Two officers attempted to tase Peter but failed. After Peter pulled out a handgun, Peter opened fire on officers, while other officers opened fire back, hitting Peter 45 times. He was taken to a nearby hospital where he died from his injuries.
2023-06-24	Melissa Perez (46)	Latino	San Antonio, Texas	Three officers shot and killed Perez in her own apartment during a mental health crisis. The officers were charged with murder the day after.
2023-06-22	Marc Child (37)	White	San Francisco, California	
2023-06-20	Cornelius S. Ball (45)	Black	Opp, Alabama	Ball allegedly stabbed and injured an officer responding to a call of a mentally ill person with a knife, causing officers to shoot him. He died of his injuries at hospital in Montgomery two days later. A community activist said that Ball was nude and unarmed at the time of the shooting.
2023-06-19	Luis Mateo Jacobo Borja	Hispanic	Phoenix, Arizona	
2023-06-19	Mark Jaggers Jr. (20)	White	Louisville, Kentucky	
2023-06-18	Obed Barba (20)		McCormick, South Carolina	
2023-06-18	Marquis Griffin (26)		Bishopville, South Carolina	
2023-06-18	unidentified adult male		Pineville, Louisiana	
2023-06-17	unidentified adult male		Caldwell, Texas	
2023-06-17	Christian Merchan-Garcia		Doral, Florida	Decedent was apparently unarmed when killed by police.
2023-06-17	Brandon Stine (38)	White	Mifflintown, Pennsylvania	
2023-06-16	unidentified adult male		Genoa, Wisconsin	
2023-06-15	unidentified adult male		Kaibito, Arizona	
2023-06-14	Wayne Edwin Simmons (54)		Lockwood, Missouri	
2023-06-14	James Dockery (45)	White	Terre Haute, Indiana	
2023-06-14	unidentified adult male		Midway City, California	
2023-06-13	Shellabell Tester (46)	White	Lenoir, North Carolina	
2023-06-13	Alex Chase Lopez (23)	Latino	Ogden, Utah	
2023-06-12	Antonio Worthy (40)		Columbia, South Carolina	
2023-06-12	Anthony John Carroll (35)		Greeley, Colorado	
2023-06-12	Dana Paul Roman (45)	Black	Richmond, Virginia	
2023-06-12	Wendell Chastain (58)		Gainesville, Florida	
2023-06-11	Roland Henry Halle (73)		Cape Coral, Florida	
2023-06-11	Adam Timberlake (28)		Selmer, Tennessee	
2023-06-10	unidentified adult male (28)		Georgetown Township, Michigan	Shot by a Ottawa County sheriff’s deputy in a wooded area. The circumstances leading up to the shooting is unknown.
2023-06-10	Murdock Jackson (33)	White	Marietta, Georgia	Jackson, who allegedly assaulted and threatened his girlfriend with a gun, was shot multiple times in a driveway of the home he was at.
2023-06-10	Christopher Wasili (39)		Chefornak, Alaska	
2023-06-09	Kristen Fairchild (42)		Kansas City, Missouri	For reasons unclear, Fairchild and Nelson were shot and killed by police.
2023-06-09	Marcell Nelson (42)	Black	Kansas City, Missouri	For reasons unclear, Fairchild and Nelson were shot and killed by police.
2023-06-09	Lucius Benjamin Gibbs (58)	Black	Salem, Alabama	
2023-06-07	Jeffrey Richardson (18)	Latino	Rantoul, Illinois	
2023-06-07	Jeffrey Neff (41)		Canton, Ohio	
2023-06-07	unidentified adult male		Denver, Colorado	
2023-06-07	unidentified adult male		Conifer, Colorado	
2023-06-06	unidentified adult male (20)		Reedley, California	
2023-06-06	unidentified adult male		Ogden, Utah	The unidentified male died during a shootout. An officer was also injured.
2023-06-06	Calvin Cains III (18)	Black	New Orleans, Louisiana	
2023-06-04	Jack Cimino (52)		Eldersburg, Maryland	
2023-06-04	Tyler Abel (42)	White	Star Prairie, Wisconsin	Abel was shot by two officers after a standoff. Abel was making threats against officers and was also threatening officers with a firearm.
2023-06-04	Anthony Allegrini Jr (18)	White	Philadelphia, Pennsylvania	
2023-06-04	unidentified adult male		Stockton, California	
2023-06-04	unidentified adult male		Kennewick, Washington	
2023-06-04	Bjorn Manycolors (30)	White	Spokane Valley, Washington	Two deputies encountered Manycolors while searching for a man with active warrants. The deputies shot and killed Manycolors after he allegedly shot at them.
2023-06-04	unidentified adult male		San Ysidro, California	
2023-06-04	Brandon Mills (35)		Harrisonburg, Virginia	
2023-06-03	Robert Dillard (51)		Myrtle, Mississippi	
2023-06-03	unidentified adult male		Carroll County, Maryland	
2023-06-03	unidentified adult male (58)		Olathe, Kansas	
2023-06-03	unidentified adult male	White	Ocala, Florida	
2023-06-03	unidentified adult male		Harvard, Illinois	
2023-06-01	Delama Casimir (37)	Black	Nashville, Tennessee	
2023-06-01	Daniel S. Meadow (40)		Amherst, Virginia	
2023-06-01	Gabriel Matthew Wilson (22)	White	Brandon, Mississippi	
2023-06-01	unidentified adult male		Hesperia, California	
2023-06-01	William Burruss (21)	Black	Blue Island, Illinois	
2023-06-01	Jor’Dell Da’Shawn Richardson (14)	Black	Aurora, Colorado	Richardson was shot by Aurora police officer Roch Gruszeczka after he, along with other teenagers, robbed a smoke shop.
2023-06-24	Jarveon Hudspeth (21)	Black	Memphis, Tennessee	Hudspeth was shot and killed by a deputy during a traffic stop June 24 on Rosswood Avenue in Raleigh. The deputy was injured.

== See also ==
- Death in custody § United States
- Henry A. Wallace Police Crime Public Database
- List of cases of police brutality
- List of countries with annual rates and counts for killings by law enforcement officers
- List of law enforcement officers killed in the line of duty in the United States
- List of law enforcement officers convicted for an on-duty killing in the United States
- List of shootings by US immigration agents
- List of police reforms related to the George Floyd protests
- List of unarmed African Americans killed by law enforcement officers in the United States
- Lists of killings by law enforcement officers
- Police brutality in the United States
- Police misconduct § United States
- Police riot § United States
- Police use of deadly force in the United States
