= Trade River =

River in northwestern Wisconsin

Coordinates: 45°34′04″N 92°46′07″W

- Native name: Atanwa (Ojibwe)

Location
- Country: United States
- State: Wisconsin
- Cities: Atlas, WI, Trade Lake, WI, Trade River, WI

Physical characteristics
- Source
  - location: Tunnel Channel Woods near Straight Lake State Park, Polk County, WI
- Mouth: St. Croix River
  - location: near Wolf Creek, WI, Polk County, Pine County, WI
- Length: 50.8 mi (81.8 km)

The Trade River is a 50.8-mile-long (81.8 km) tributary of the St. Croix River in northwestern Wisconsin in the United States. In its history, it has been known by the names "Atanwa" or "Ottoway" River, both of which are Anglicized versions of an Ojibwe language word meaning "trade" (see Ottawa). Beneath the mouth of the Trade River, the St. Croix River was once known as the Grave-marker River.

The Trade River begins in the Straight Lake Tunnel Channel Woods in northern Polk County, Wisconsin, and flows northward before bending westward to meet the South Fork a few miles south of Frederic. The South Fork of the Trade River begins in wetlands north of Luck and flows northward, roughly parallel to State Highway 35, until it meets the main branch. The Trade River then winds its way westward through farmland and a series of lakes in northern Polk and southern Burnett counties. West of State Highway 87, it is joined by the North Fork Trade River, which flows south-southwest from Isaac Lake via Canute Creek Flowage. Shortly thereafter, the river enters Governor Knowles State Forest and flows through pine barrens in the town of Sterling before joining the St. Croix River.

== Cities and towns ==
- Trade River, Wisconsin
- Trade Lake, Wisconsin

== See also ==
- List of rivers of Wisconsin
