= Straight River (Wisconsin) =

Coordinates: 45°31′57″N 92°18′36″W

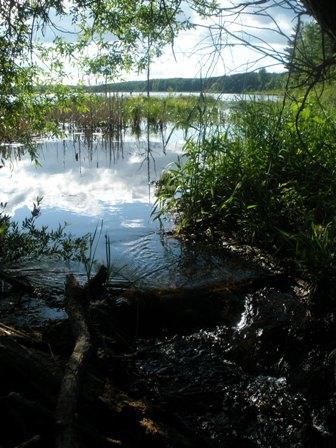
- The river at its source, Straight Lake

Location
- Country: United States

Physical characteristics
- Source
  - location: Wisconsin
- Length: 15.5 mi (24.9 km)
- Basin size: Upper Apple-Lower St. Croix-Mississippi

The Straight River is a 15.5-mile-long (24.9 km) tributary of the Apple River located entirely within Polk County, Wisconsin in the United States. The Straight River rises in wetlands west of Straight Lake in Straight Lake State Park. After exiting Straight Lake, the river flows generally southeastward toward Big Round Lake in the town of Georgetown. From Big Round, the Straight flows through Little and Big Blake lakes, before meeting Fox Creek, the outlet of Bone Lake. Below the confluence, Fox Creek flows southward for 5.2 miles (8.4 km), roughly parallel to County Road I/H, before meeting the Apple River a few miles west of White Ash Lake within the town of Apple River.

The Straight River flows through the Straight River Tunnel Channel, a well-preserved glacial tunnel flanked by the Ice Age National Scenic Trail. This tunnel channel was formed between 15,000-18,000 years ago, near the end of the most recent Ice Age. During this time, melt water from deep beneath the layer of ice on the glacier's surface was forced under extreme pressure towards the glacier's margin. The Straight River Tunnel Channel is considered to be the finest example of this rare glacial phenomenon in Wisconsin.

== See also ==
- Straight Lake State Park
- Tunnel valley
- List of rivers of Wisconsin
