= Lee County, Alabama =

County in Alabama, United States

- County
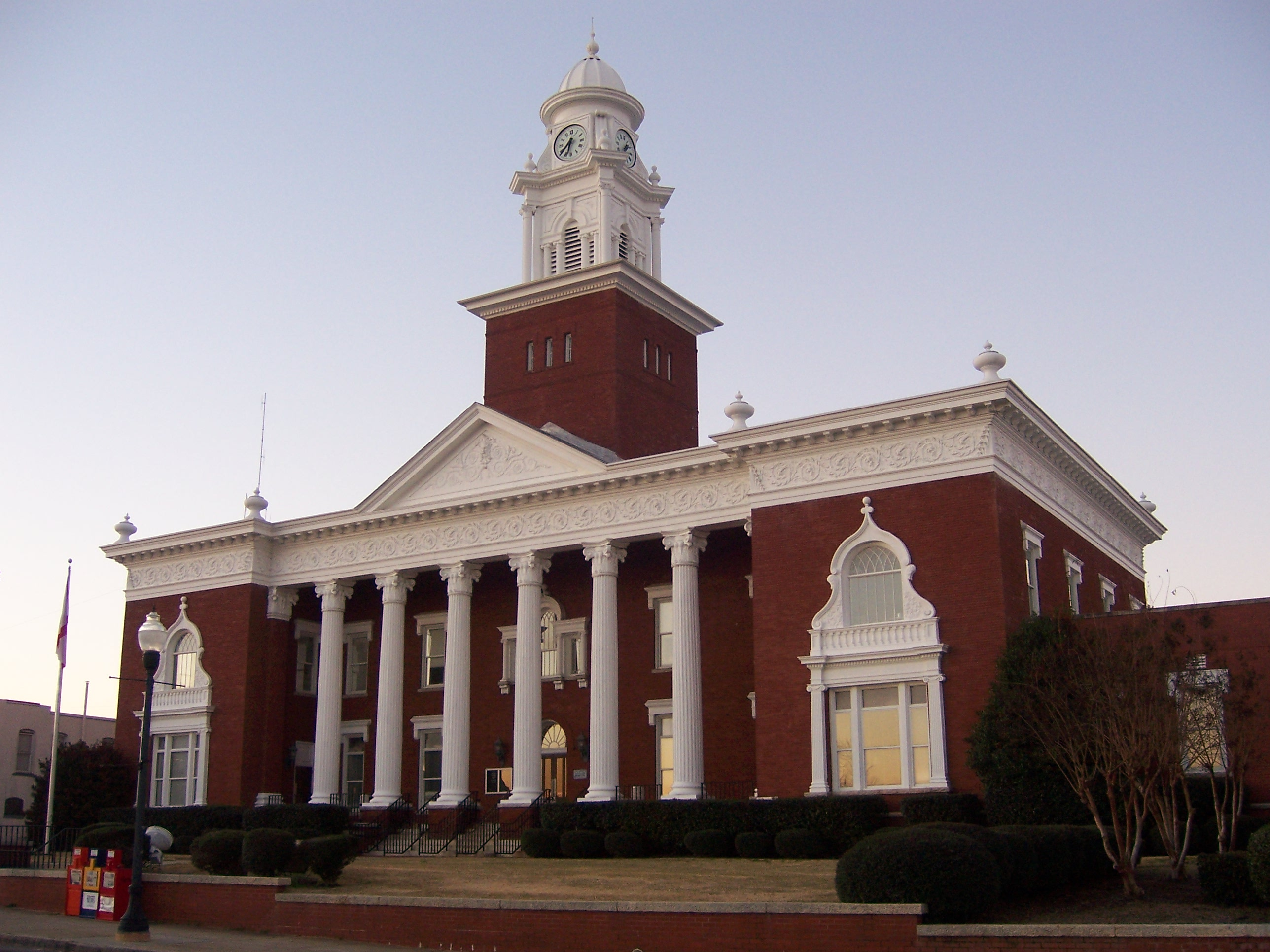
- Main façade of Lee Courthouse, 2009

- Seal
- Motto: "The Heart of Dixie"
- Location within the U.S. state of Alabama
- Coordinates: 32°36′05″N 85°21′13″W
- Country: United States
- State: Alabama
- Founded: December 5, 1866; 159 years ago
- Named for: General Robert E. Lee
- Seat: Opelika
- Largest city: Auburn

Area
  - Total: 616 sq mi (1,600 km^{2})
  - Land: 608 sq mi (1,570 km^{2})
  - Water: 8.3 sq mi (21 km^{2}) 1.3%

Population (2020)
  - Total: 174,241
  - Estimate (2025): 189,881 ▲
  - Density: 287/sq mi (111/km^{2})
- Time zone: UTC−6 (Central)
  - Summer (DST): UTC−5 (CDT)
- Congressional district: 3rd
- Website: www.leeco.us
- County Number 43 on Alabama License Plates; Largest County by population not shuffled to top 08 on Alabama License Plates

Lee County is a county located in east central Alabama. As of the 2020 census the population was 174,241. The county seat is Opelika, and the largest city is Auburn. The county was established in 1866 and is named for General Robert E. Lee (1807–1870), who served as General in Chief of the Armies of the Confederate States in 1865. Lee County comprises the Auburn-Opelika, AL Metropolitan Statistical Area, which is included in the Columbus-Auburn-Opelika, GA-AL Combined Statistical Area.

== History ==
=== 19th century ===
Lee County was established by the State Legislature on December 5, 1866, comprising parts of Macon, Tallapoosa, Chambers, and Russell counties. In an election to determine the county seat, Opelika was chosen over Auburn and Salem.

=== 20th century ===
In 1923, Phenix City, located in the southeastern corner of Lee County, merged with the town of Girard, located in the northeastern corner of Russell County. To prevent the new town of Phenix City from straddling the Lee-Russell line, Lee County ceded to Russell County the 10 square miles (25.9 km^{2}) in the southeastern corner surrounding Phenix City in exchange for 20 square miles (51.8 km^{2}) in the northwest corner of Russell County surrounding the unincorporated community of Marvyn. This territory is what forms the southern "panhandle" of Lee County. Even after the land swap with Russell County, however, the city limits of present-day Phenix City stretch into the southeastern corner of Lee.

=== 21st century ===
On March 3, 2019, a series of tornadoes hit the county, killing 23 people and injuring others. The deaths and injuries occurred in the community of Beauregard, situated southeast of the Auburn-Opelika metropolitan area.

== Geography ==
According to the United States Census Bureau, the county has a total area of 616 square miles (1,600 km^{2}), of which 608 square miles (1,570 km^{2}) is land and 8.3 square miles (21 km^{2}) (1.3%) is water.

The county straddles the fall line between the Piedmont region to the north, and the Gulf coastal plain to the south. Thus, northern areas of the county are hillier compared to southern areas of the county.

=== Major highways ===
- Interstate 85
- U.S. Highway 29 / State Route 15 (unsigned)
- U.S. Highway 80 / State Route 8 (unsigned)
- U.S. Highway 280 / State Route 38 (unsigned)
- U.S. Highway 431 / State Route 1 (unsigned)
- State Route 14
- State Route 51
- State Route 147
- State Route 169

=== Adjacent counties ===
- Chambers County (north)
- Harris County, Georgia (northeast)
- Muscogee County, Georgia (east)
- Russell County (south)
- Macon County (southwest)
- Tallapoosa County (northwest)

=== Railroads ===
- CSX A&WP Subdivision
- Norfolk Southern Central of Georgia District

== Demographics ==
Historical population
Census	Pop.	Note	%±
1870	21,750		—
1880	27,262		25.3%
1890	28,694		5.3%
1900	31,826		10.9%
1910	32,867		3.3%
1920	32,821		−0.1%
1930	36,063		9.9%
1940	36,455		1.1%
1950	45,073		23.6%
1960	49,754		10.4%
1970	61,268		23.1%
1980	76,283		24.5%
1990	87,146		14.2%
2000	115,092		32.1%
2010	140,247		21.9%
2020	174,241		24.2%
2025 (est.)	189,881	▲	9.0%
U.S. Decennial Census; 1790–1960 1900–1990; 1990–2000 2010–2020

=== Racial and ethnic composition ===
Lee County, Alabama – Racial and ethnic composition Note: the US Census treats Hispanic/Latino as an ethnic category. This table excludes Latinos from the racial categories and assigns them to a separate category. Hispanics/Latinos may be of any race.
Race / Ethnicity (NH = Non-Hispanic)	Pop 2000	Pop 2010	Pop 2020	% 2000	% 2010	% 2020
White alone (NH)	84,298	97,900	107,795	73.24%	69.81%	63.01%
Black or African American alone (NH)	25,954	31,674	39,252	22.55%	22.58%	22.53%
Native American or Alaska Native alone (NH)	251	397	365	0.22%	0.28%	0.21%
Asian alone (NH)	1,864	3,615	8,544	1.62%	2.58%	4.90%
Pacific Islander alone (NH)	19	66	108	0.02%	0.05%	0.06%
Other race alone (NH)	99	164	462	0.09%	0.12%	0.27%
Mixed race or Multiracial (NH)	962	1,860	6,580	0.84%	1.33%	3.78%
Hispanic or Latino (any race)	1,645	4,571	9,135	1.43%	3.26%	5.24%
Total	115,092	140,247	174,241	100.00%	100.00%	100.00%

=== 2020 census ===
As of the 2020 census, there were 174,241 people, 68,728 households, and 41,796 families residing in the county. The population density was 286.8 inhabitants per square mile (110.7/km^{2}). The median age was 31.4 years. 21.7% of residents were under the age of 18 and 12.4% of residents were 65 years of age or older. For every 100 females there were 95.8 males, and for every 100 females age 18 and over there were 92.8 males age 18 and over.

The racial makeup of the county was 64.1% White, 22.7% Black or African American, 0.4% American Indian and Alaska Native, 4.9% Asian, 0.1% Native Hawaiian and Pacific Islander, 2.5% from some other race, and 5.3% from two or more races. Hispanic or Latino residents of any race comprised 5.2% of the population.

73.6% of residents lived in urban areas, while 26.4% lived in rural areas.

There were 68,728 households in the county, of which 30.0% had children under the age of 18 living with them and 30.0% had a female householder with no spouse or partner present. About 28.5% of all households were made up of individuals and 7.7% had someone living alone who was 65 years of age or older.

There were 74,856 housing units, of which 8.2% were vacant. Among occupied housing units, 58.1% were owner-occupied and 41.9% were renter-occupied. The homeowner vacancy rate was 1.6% and the rental vacancy rate was 6.1%.

=== 2010 census ===
As of the 2010 census, there were 140,247 people, 55,682 households, and 33,692 families living in the county. The population density was 227.7 people per square mile (87.9 people/km^{2}). There were 62,391 housing units at an average density of 101.3 units per square mile (39.1 units/km^{2}). The racial makeup of the county was 71.3% White, 22.7% Black or African American, 0.3% Native American, 2.6% Asian, 0.1% Pacific Islander, 1.3% from other races, and 1.6% from two or more races. 3.3% of the population were Hispanic or Latino of any race.

Of the 55,682 households 28.0% had children under the age of 18 living with them, 43.1% were married couples living together, 13.0% had a female householder with no husband present, and 39.5% were non-families. 27.9% of households were one person and 6.0% were one person aged 65 or older. The average household size was 2.44 and the average family size was 3.03.

The age distribution was 22.5% under the age of 18, 20.5% from 18 to 24, 26.1% from 25 to 44, 21.8% from 45 to 64, and 9.1% 65 or older. The median age was 28.3 years. For every 100 females, there were 97.2 males. For every 100 females age 18 and over, there were 98.0 males.

The median household income was $40,894 and the median family income was $59,112. Males had a median income of $42,335 versus $31,766 for females. The per capita income for the county was $22,794. About 11.0% of families and 19.2% of the population were below the poverty line, including 19.0% of those under age 18 and 9.0% of those age 65 or over.

=== 2000 Census ===
As of the 2000 census, there were 115,092 people, 45,702 households, and 27,284 families living in the county. The population density was 189 people per square mile (73 people/km^{2}). There were 50,329 housing units at an average density of 83 units per square mile (32 units/km^{2}). The racial makeup of the county was 74.1% White, 22.7% Black or African American, 0.2% Native American, 1.6% Asian, 0.02% Pacific Islander, 0.5% from other races, and 0.9% from two or more races. 1.4% of the population were Hispanic or Latino of any race.

Of the 45,702 households 29.7% had children under the age of 18 living with them, 44.1% were married couples living together, 11.8% had a female householder with no husband present, and 40.3% were non-families. 27.8% of households were one person and 5.7% were one person aged 65 or older. The average household size was 2.42 and the average family size was 3.03.

The age distribution was 23.3% under the age of 18, 22.7% from 18 to 24, 28.1% from 25 to 44, 17.8% from 45 to 64, and 8.1% 65 or older. The median age was 28 years. For every 100 females, there were 96.90 males. For every 100 females age 18 and over, there were 95.20 males.

The median household income was $30,952 and the median family income was $46,781. Males had a median income of $33,598 versus $23,228 for females. The per capita income for the county was $17,158. About 11.1% of families and 21.8% of the population were below the poverty line, including 16.3% of those under age 18 and 12.0% of those age 65 or over.

== Government ==
Among the principal governmental functions vested in Alabama counties are law enforcement; tax assessment, levy and collection; administration of decedent's estates and probate matters; maintenance of real and personal property title records; construction and maintenance of public roads and bridges; and maintenance of the county courthouse, which provides office space for various county officials and departments. Lee County is one of only seven counties in Alabama that has been granted limited home rule. It is governed by a six-member county commission, composed of the Probate Judge and five commissioners. The Probate Judge is elected countywide for a six-year term and serves as chairman of the commission. The other commissioners are elected from single-member districts for four-year terms. Each commissioner must be a registered voter and live within the district they represent. Terms are staggered so that three commissioners are elected in one election cycle, and the other two members are elected in the next election cycle two years later.

The County Commission employs a County Administrator, who serves as its chief administrative officer. It is the responsibility of the County Administrator to carry out the policies and directives of the commission, and for the development and management of the county's annual operating budget. The Administrator serves as the budgetary agent for all county offices. The County Administrator is also responsible for the supervision and management of various department heads, and for ensuring that all agreements, leases and other contractual obligations of the commission are properly performed. The County Administrator works with Lee County Commissioners and other elected county officials to facilitate the delivery of quality and effective services to the citizens of Lee County.

Lee County is very conservative for a county dominated by a college town. While other such counties have swung heavily to the Democrats since the 1990s, Lee County has not supported a Democrat for president since 1960. The last Democrat to garner over 40 percent of the county's vote was Jimmy Carter in both of his election campaigns in 1976 and 1980. However, Bill Clinton tallied over 38 percent of the county's vote in both of his successful runs for president, as did Barack Obama in both of his campaigns.

United States presidential election results for Lee County, Alabama
Year	Republican		Democratic		Third party(ies)	
Year	No.	%	No.	%	No.	%
1888	1,432	41.80%	1,991	58.11%	3	0.09%
1892	318	7.14%	2,760	61.99%	1,374	30.86%
1896	1,491	43.83%	1,737	51.06%	174	5.11%
1900	1,026	36.04%	1,718	60.34%	103	3.62%
1904	40	2.80%	1,348	94.40%	40	2.80%
1908	64	5.02%	1,126	88.38%	84	6.59%
1912	43	3.25%	1,179	88.98%	103	7.77%
1916	42	2.90%	1,369	94.67%	35	2.42%
1920	155	8.19%	1,620	85.58%	118	6.23%
1924	98	6.52%	1,290	85.77%	116	7.71%
1928	1,016	41.38%	1,436	58.49%	3	0.12%
1932	103	4.90%	1,988	94.53%	12	0.57%
1936	93	4.07%	2,183	95.62%	7	0.31%
1940	103	3.85%	2,566	95.96%	5	0.19%
1944	134	6.23%	2,011	93.49%	6	0.28%
1948	258	12.86%	0	0.00%	1,749	87.14%
1952	1,626	36.67%	2,803	63.22%	5	0.11%
1956	1,586	31.40%	3,302	65.37%	163	3.23%
1960	2,301	37.73%	3,759	61.63%	39	0.64%
1964	5,914	78.69%	0	0.00%	1,602	21.31%
1968	2,366	18.01%	2,803	21.34%	7,967	60.65%
1972	11,571	74.94%	3,622	23.46%	248	1.61%
1976	9,884	52.75%	8,427	44.98%	426	2.27%
1980	10,982	49.98%	9,606	43.72%	1,384	6.30%
1984	16,757	64.05%	9,077	34.70%	327	1.25%
1988	17,180	64.39%	9,078	34.02%	425	1.59%
1992	16,885	47.58%	13,770	38.80%	4,835	13.62%
1996	17,985	54.15%	12,919	38.90%	2,310	6.95%
2000	22,433	58.63%	14,574	38.09%	1,257	3.29%
2004	27,972	62.70%	16,227	36.38%	411	0.92%
2008	32,230	59.33%	21,498	39.57%	597	1.10%
2012	32,194	59.08%	21,381	39.23%	921	1.69%
2016	34,617	58.48%	21,230	35.87%	3,344	5.65%
2020	42,221	59.09%	27,860	38.99%	1,368	1.91%
2024	46,020	62.93%	25,798	35.28%	1,309	1.79%

United States Senate election results for Lee County, Alabama2
Year	Republican		Democratic		Third party(ies)	
Year	No.	%	No.	%	No.	%
2020	41,154	57.76%	29,986	42.08%	114	0.16%

United States Senate election results for Lee County, Alabama3
Year	Republican		Democratic		Third party(ies)	
Year	No.	%	No.	%	No.	%
2022	26,966	66.45%	12,458	30.70%	1,158	2.85%

Alabama Gubernatorial election results for Lee County
Year	Republican		Democratic		Third party(ies)	
Year	No.	%	No.	%	No.	%
2022	27,242	67.11%	11,803	29.08%	1,548	3.81%

== Education ==
Lee County is home to Auburn University, a large comprehensive public university, and Southern Union State Community College, a two-year degree and technical college.

There are four school districts in the County:

- Auburn City Schools
- Lee County Schools
- Opelika City Schools
- Phenix City Public Schools

== Communities ==
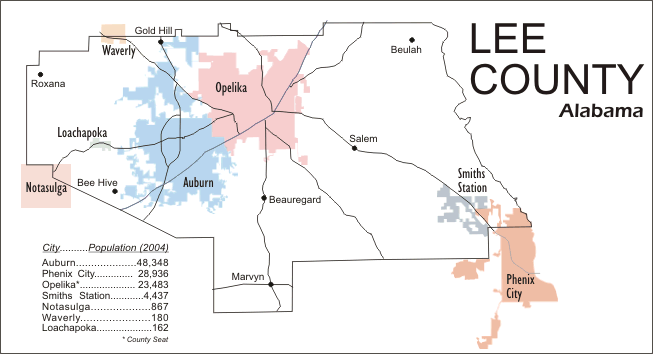

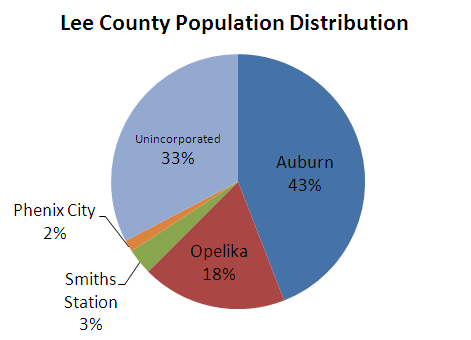
Population distribution in Lee County by municipality, 2010

=== Cities ===
- Auburn
- Opelika (county seat)
- Phenix City (partly in Russell County)
- Smiths Station

=== Towns ===
- Loachapoka
- Notasulga (partly in Macon County)
- Waverly (partly in Chambers County)

=== Unincorporated communities ===
- Beans Mill
- Beauregard
- Bee Hive
- Beulah
- Chewacla
- Gold Hill
- Hopewell
- Marvyn
- Roxana
- Salem
- The Bottle

== Places of interest ==
Lee County is home to Auburn University Museum of Natural History, Chewacla State Park, the Jule Collins Smith Museum of Fine Art, Bean's Mill, the Salem-Shotwell Covered Bridge and the Grand National Golf course which is part of the Robert Trent Jones Golf Trail.

== Gallery ==
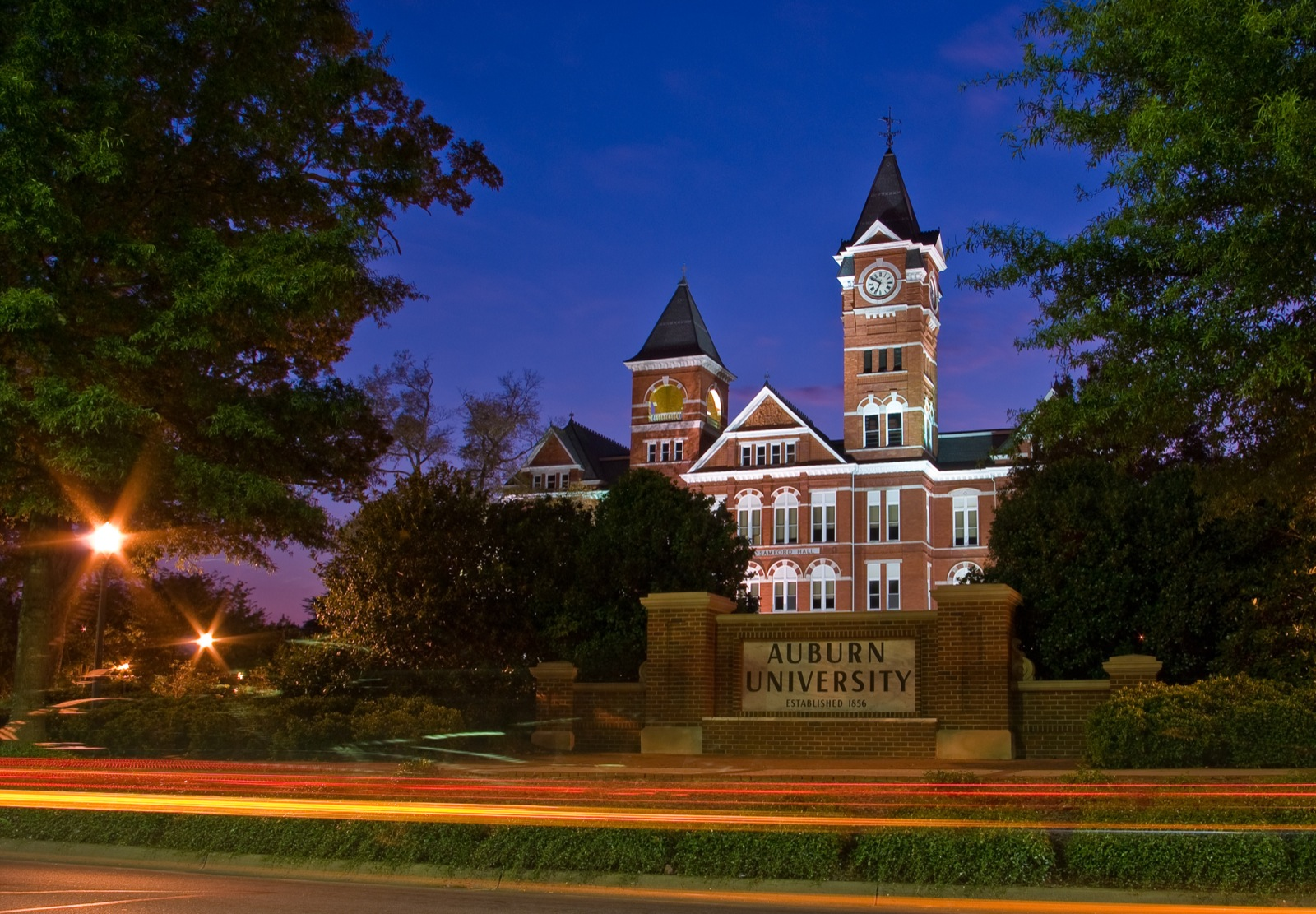
Samford Hall at the Auburn University, 2008.

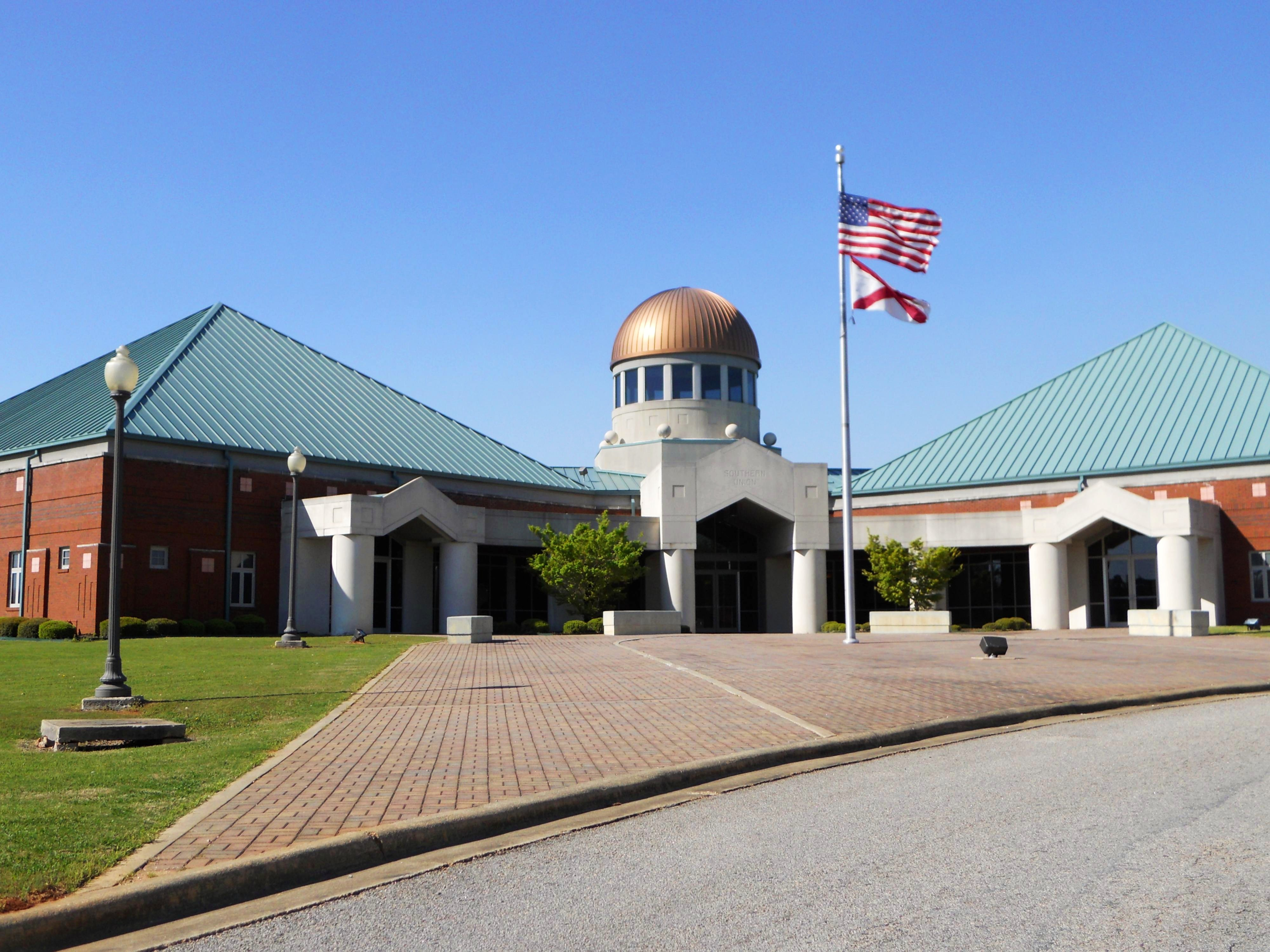
Southern Union SCC's Opelika Campus, 2011.

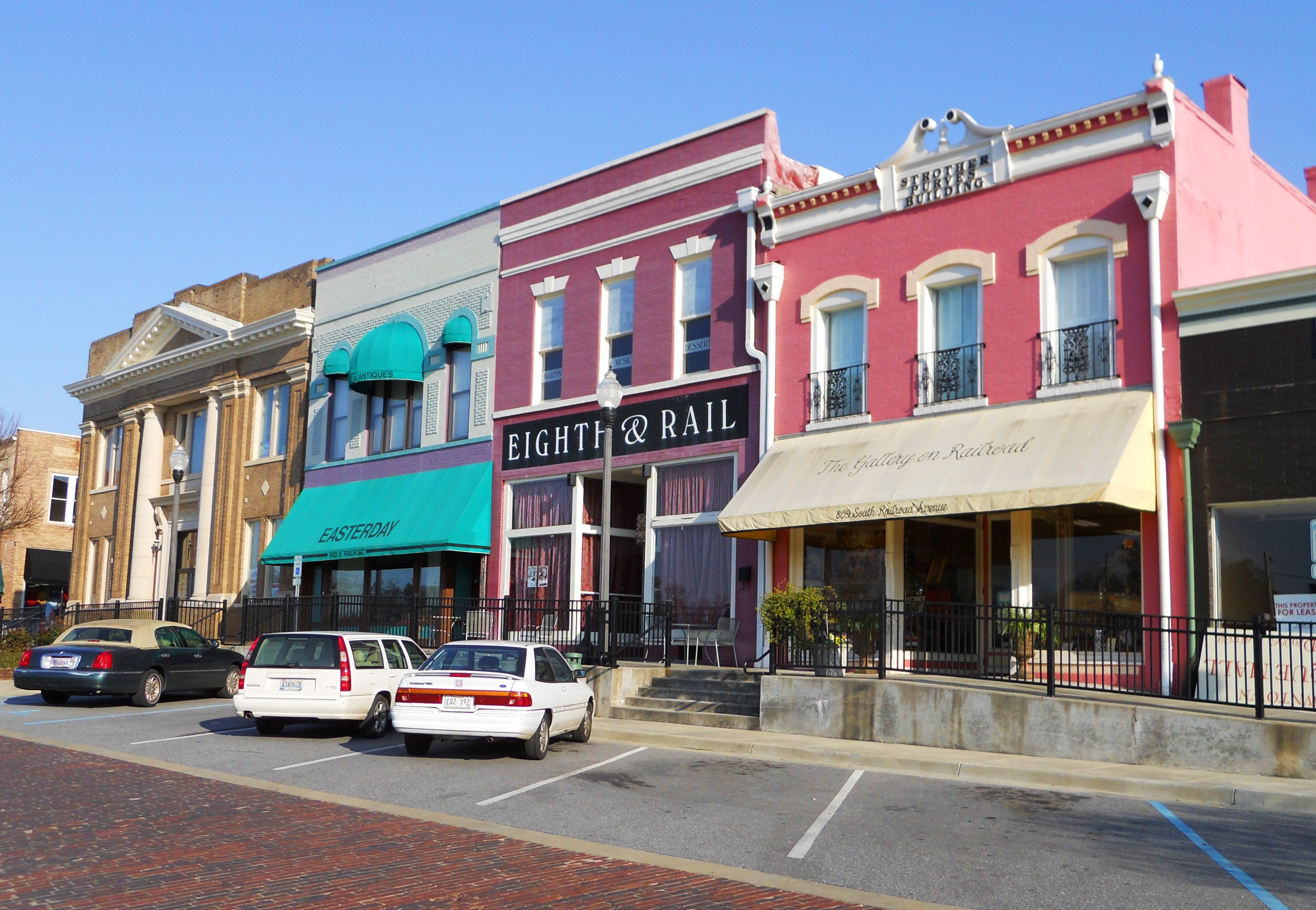
Opelika's Historic Railroad Avenue, 2011.

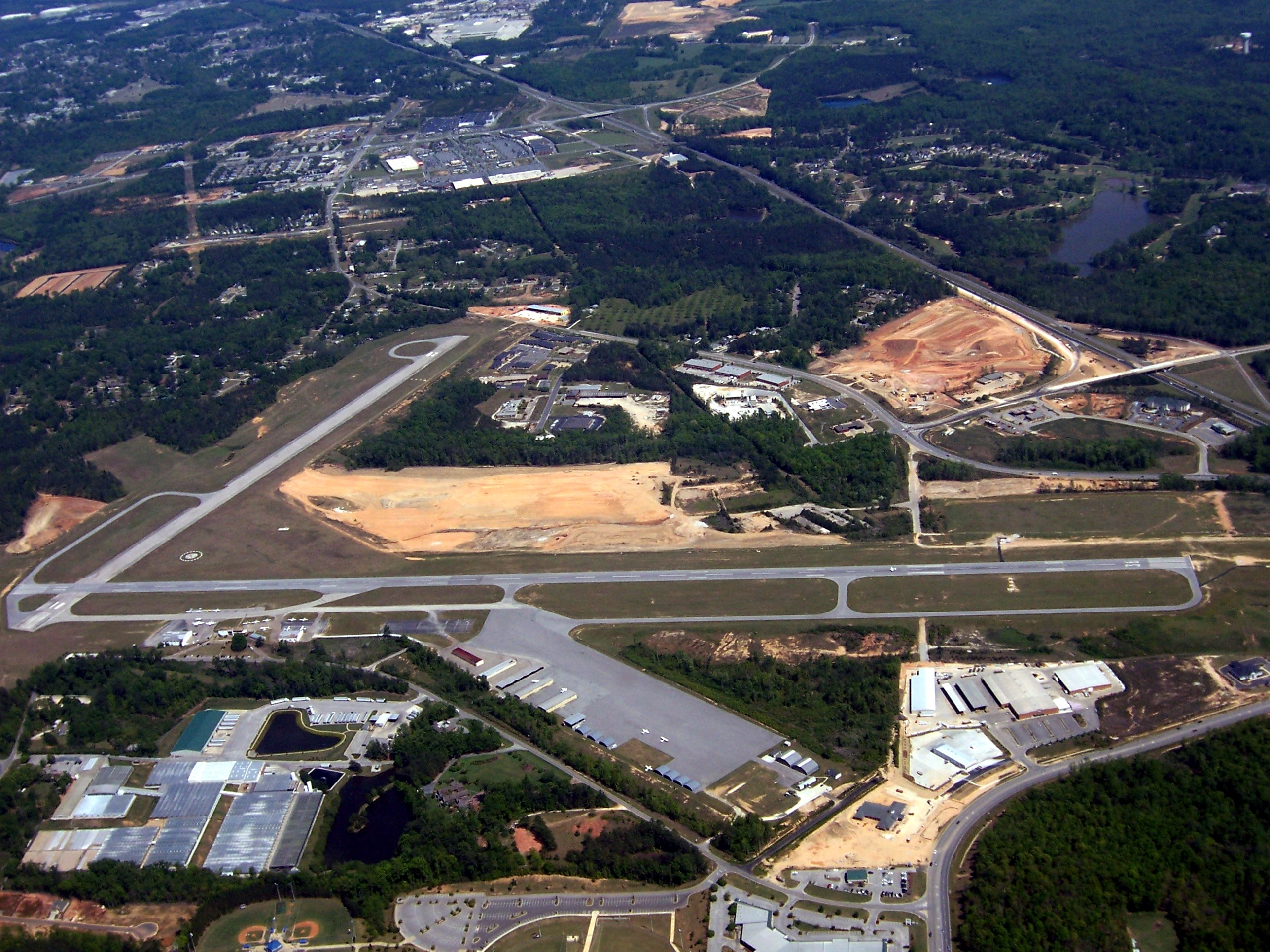
Auburn University Regional Airport, 2007.

== See also ==
- List of memorials to Robert E. Lee
- National Register of Historic Places listings in Lee County, Alabama
- Properties on the Alabama Register of Landmarks and Heritage in Lee County, Alabama
