= Beans Mill, Alabama =

Beans Mill is a grist mill in Lee County, Alabama, United States. Originally called Floyd's Mill, it is now named after George W. Bean who purchased the mill from John W. Floyd in 1903 and also operated a sawmill at the site.
