= Chewacla, Alabama =

Unincorporated community in Alabama, United States

- Unincorporated community
- Location within Alabama Location within the United States
- Coordinates: 32°37′12″N 85°20′14″W
- Country: United States
- State: Alabama
- County: Lee
- Elevation: 771 ft (235 m)
- Time zone: UTC-6 (CST)
  - Summer (DST): UTC-6 (EDT)
- GNIS feature ID: 156176

Chewacla, /tʃuˈwɑːklə/ choo-ahk-lə also known as Yongesborough /jɔːŋɡʊsbɔːrɔː/ yawn-guus-baw-raw, is an unincorporated community in the northeast corner of Lee County, Alabama, United States.

== History ==
The name Chewacla is derived from the Hitchiti word sawackla, with sawi meaning "racoon" and ukli meaning "town". Chewacla was located on the Central of Georgia Railway. It was once home to the Chewacla Lime Works, which operated a quarry. A specific type of marble, known as Chewacla marble, was mined in this quarry. Chewacla marble was described as "a highly crystalline dolomite, for most part a beautiful pearly white stone". Gneiss was also mined in the quarry and used to make millstones.

Chewacla was the location of one of the first Rosenwald schools in Alabama.

A post office operated under the name Yongesborough from 1859 to 1886 and under the name Chewacla from 1886 to 1907.

== Gallery ==
Below are photographs taken in Chewacla as part of the Historic American Buildings Survey:

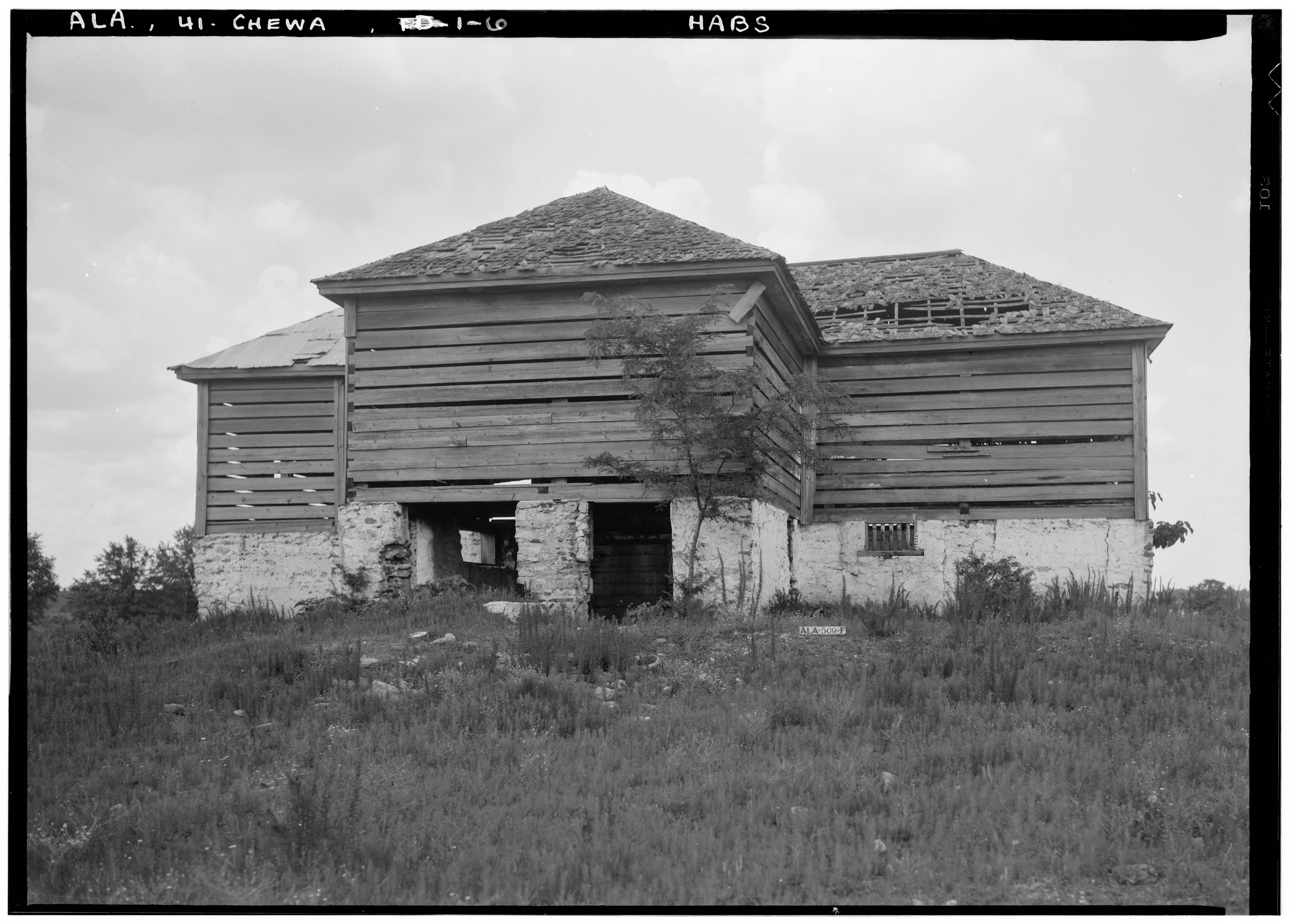
Convict quarters, Chewacla Lime Works

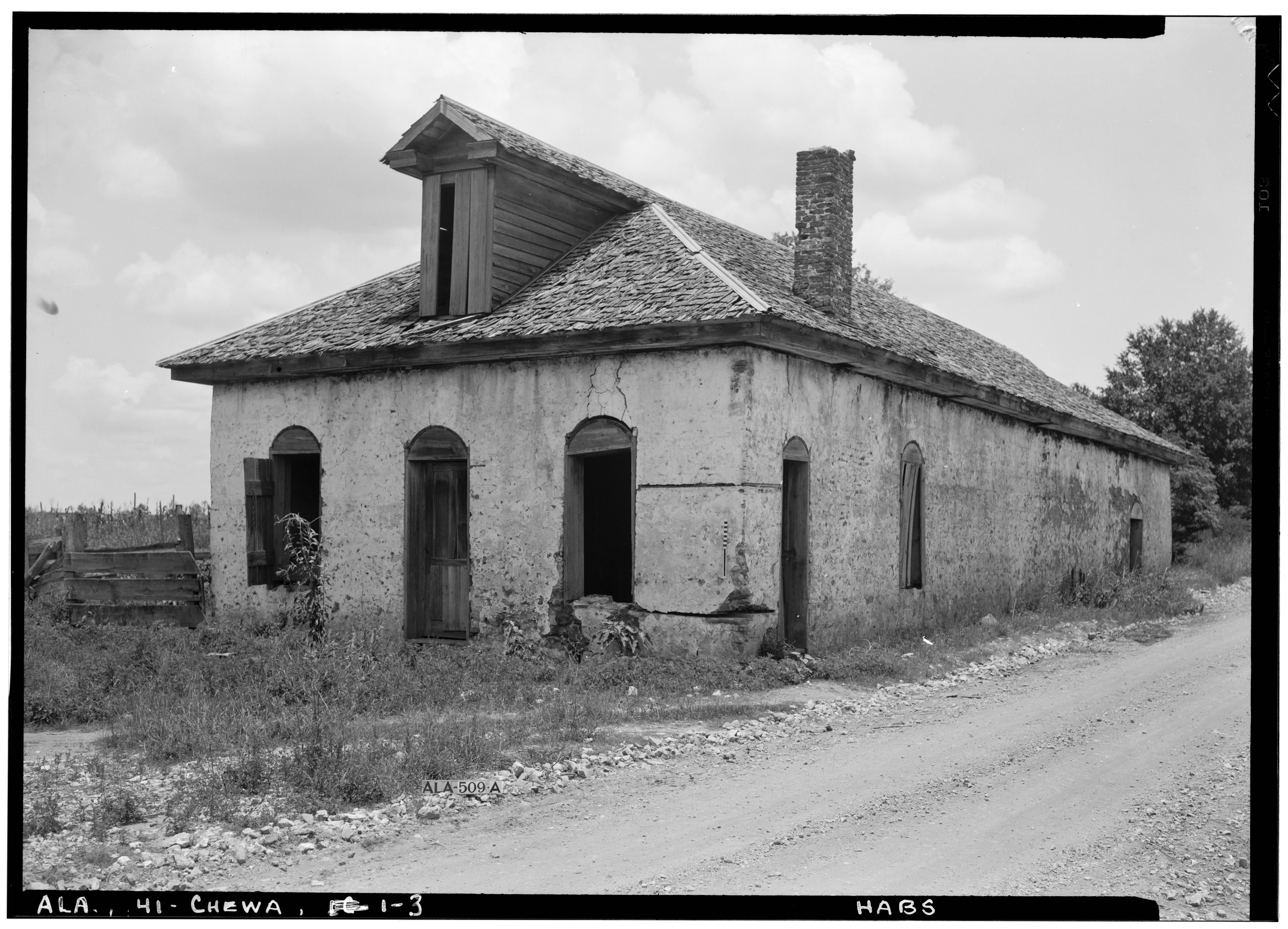
Old commissary building, Chewacla Lime Works

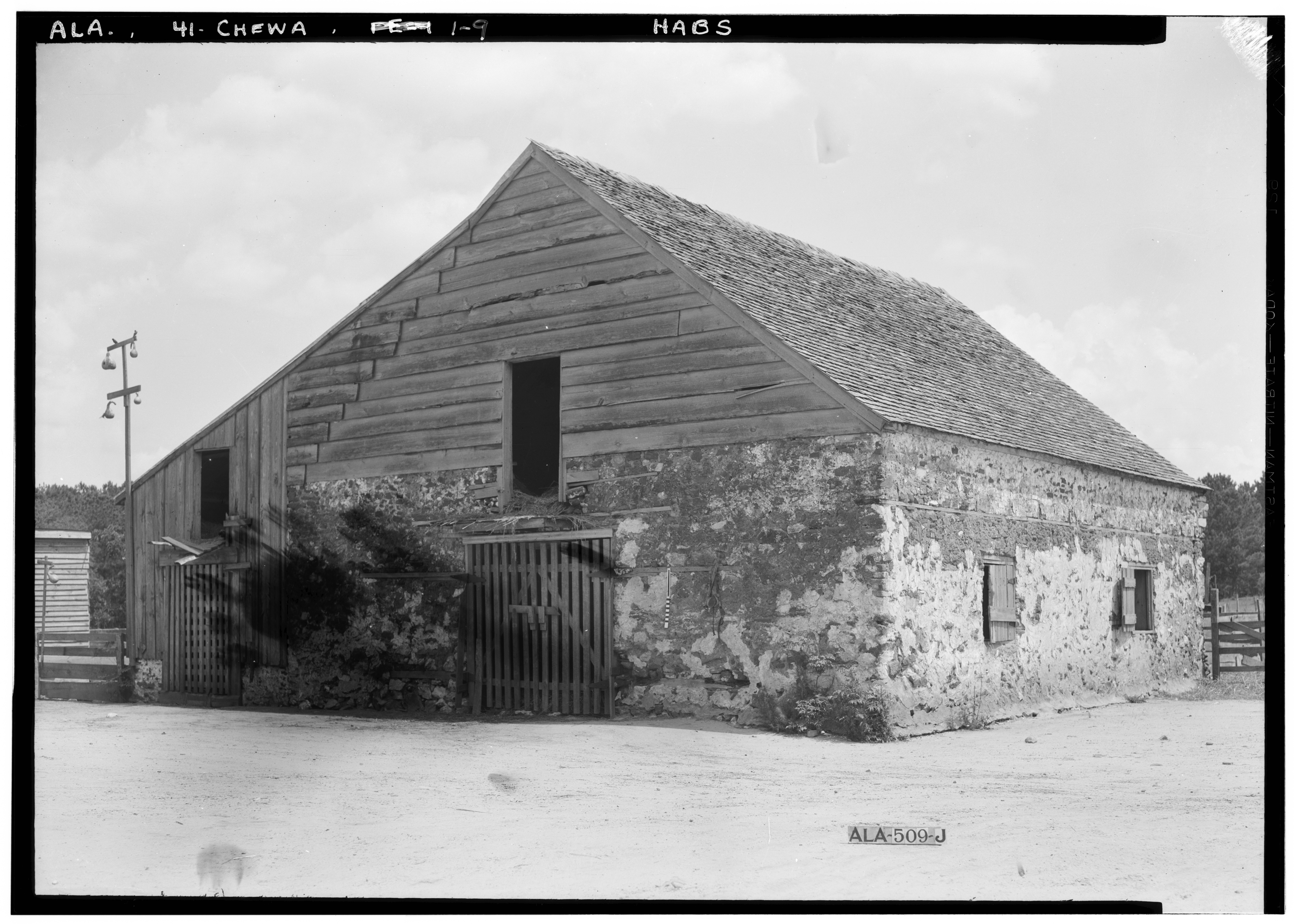
Old mule stable, Chewacla Lime Works

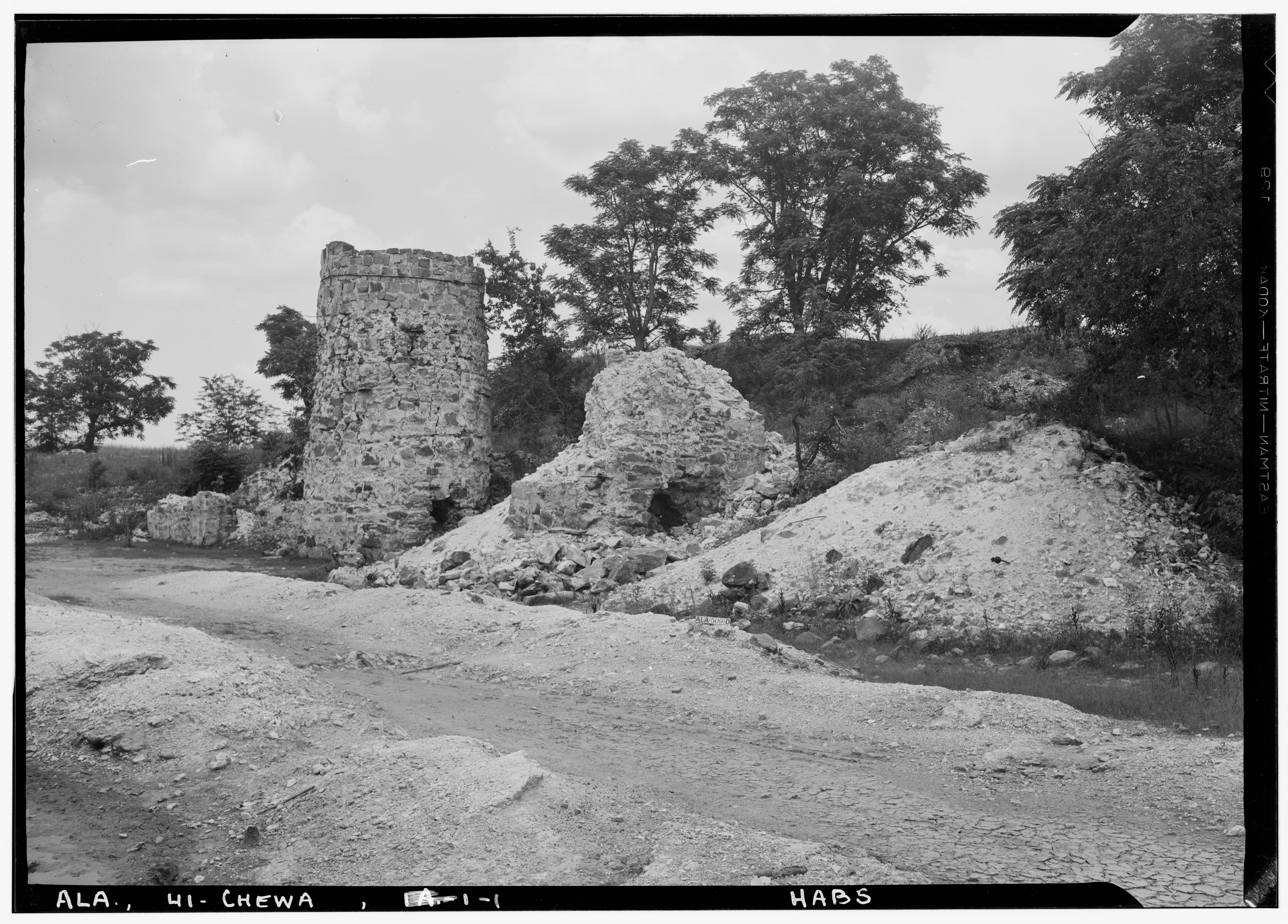
Remains of old lime kilns

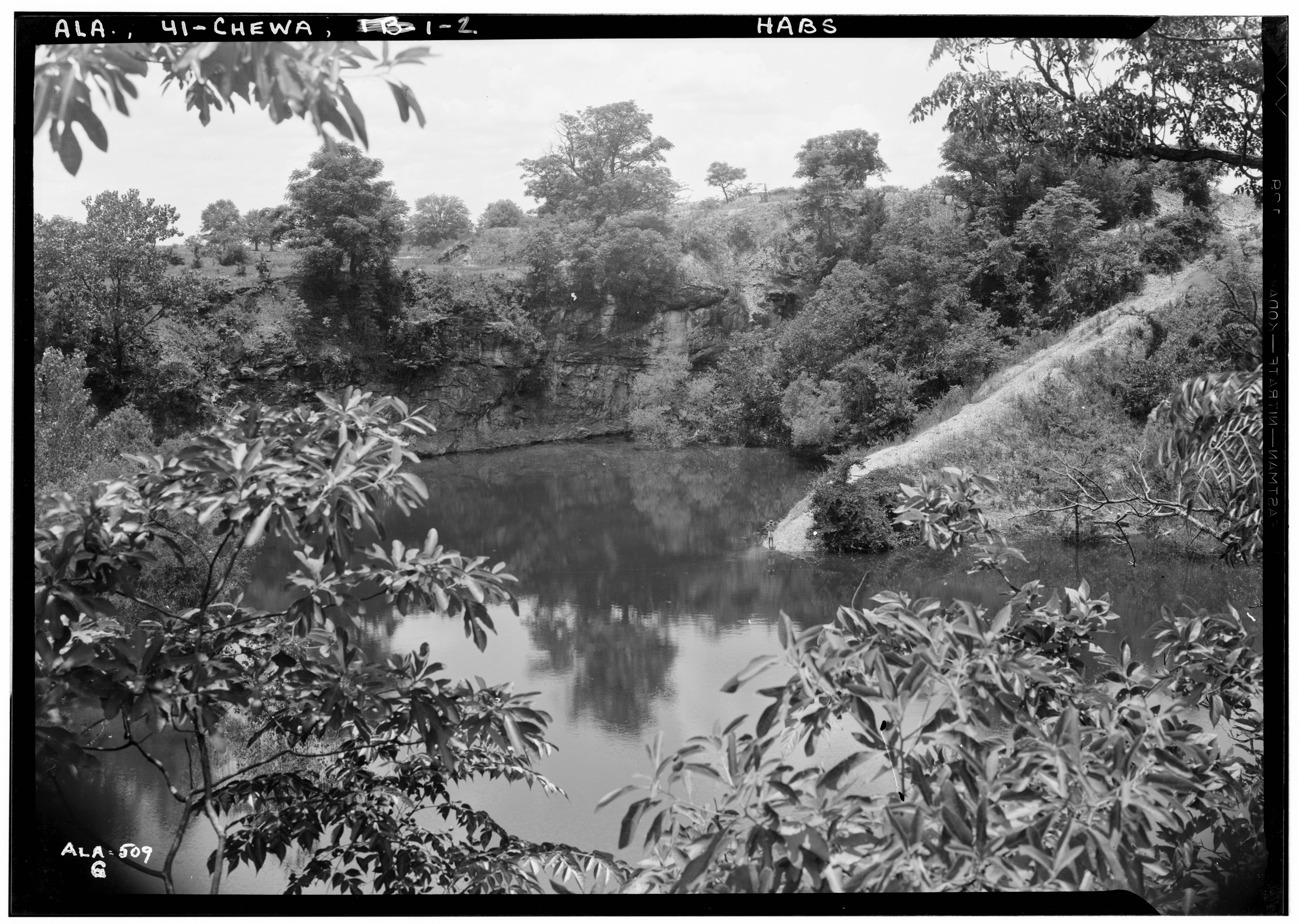
Old lime pit
