= Salem-Shotwell Covered Bridge =

Salem-Shotwell CB
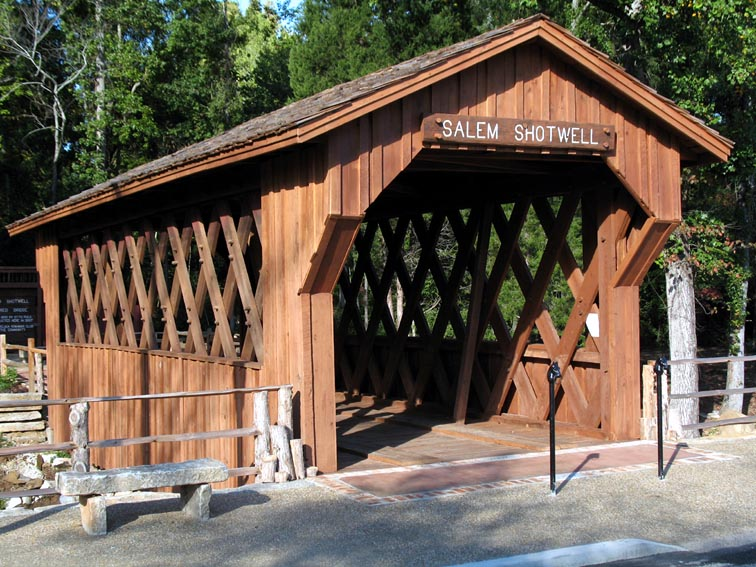
- The reconstructed Salem-Shotwell Covered Bridge in Opelika, Alabama.
- Coordinates: 32°39′33.46″N 85°22′52.94″W
- Carries: pedestrian traffic
- Crosses: Rocky Brook
- Locale: Opelika, Alabama
- Maintained by: City of Opelika
- ID number: 01-41-B (WGCB)

Characteristics
- Design: Town Lattice truss
- Total length: 43 ft (13 m)

History
- Construction end: 1900 (rebuilt 2007)

Alabama Register of Landmarks and Heritage
- Designated: January 25, 1997

Location
- Interactive map of Salem-Shotwell CB

The Salem-Shotwell Covered Bridge, also known as the Pea Ridge Covered Bridge, is a locally owned wooden covered bridge that spans Rocky Brook in Lee County, Alabama, United States. It is located halfway down Park Road (formerly the east end of 7th Avenue) at Opelika Municipal Park, which is off North 5th Street in the city of Opelika. Coordinates are 32°39′33.46″N 85°22′52.94″W (32.659294, -85.381372).

Originally built in 1900, the 43-foot (13-meter) bridge is a Town Lattice truss construction over a single span. Its WGCB number is 01-41-B, formerly 01-41-04. The bridge was listed on the Alabama Register of Landmarks and Heritage on January 25, 1977. It was destroyed by a fallen tree in 2005 at its original location near Salem, then rebuilt in 2007 at Opelika Municipal Park. The bridge is maintained by the Opelika Kiwanis Club and the City of Opelika.

== History ==
The Salem-Shotwell Covered Bridge was first built by Otto Puls, originally located over Wacoochee Creek on what is now Shotwell Road (CR 252) just north of the community of Salem (Coordinates 32°36′35.09″N 85°12′30.33″W (32.609747, -85.208425)). This was about 10 miles (16 kilometers) east of its current location. At that time, the bridge was 76 feet (23 m) in length...constructed using longleaf heart pine, cedar roof shakes and hand-hewn white oak pegs which joined the latticework, roof trusses and substructure. The bridge shortened the travel time between the communities of Salem and Shotwell. Occasional repairs were made over the years, along with a restoration of the bridge by the Lee County Commission in 1973, but high water and erosion from various storms had once again taken a toll on the bridge supports. Eventually, the Salem-Shotwell Covered Bridge was closed to motor traffic in 1994 and left to survive the elements.

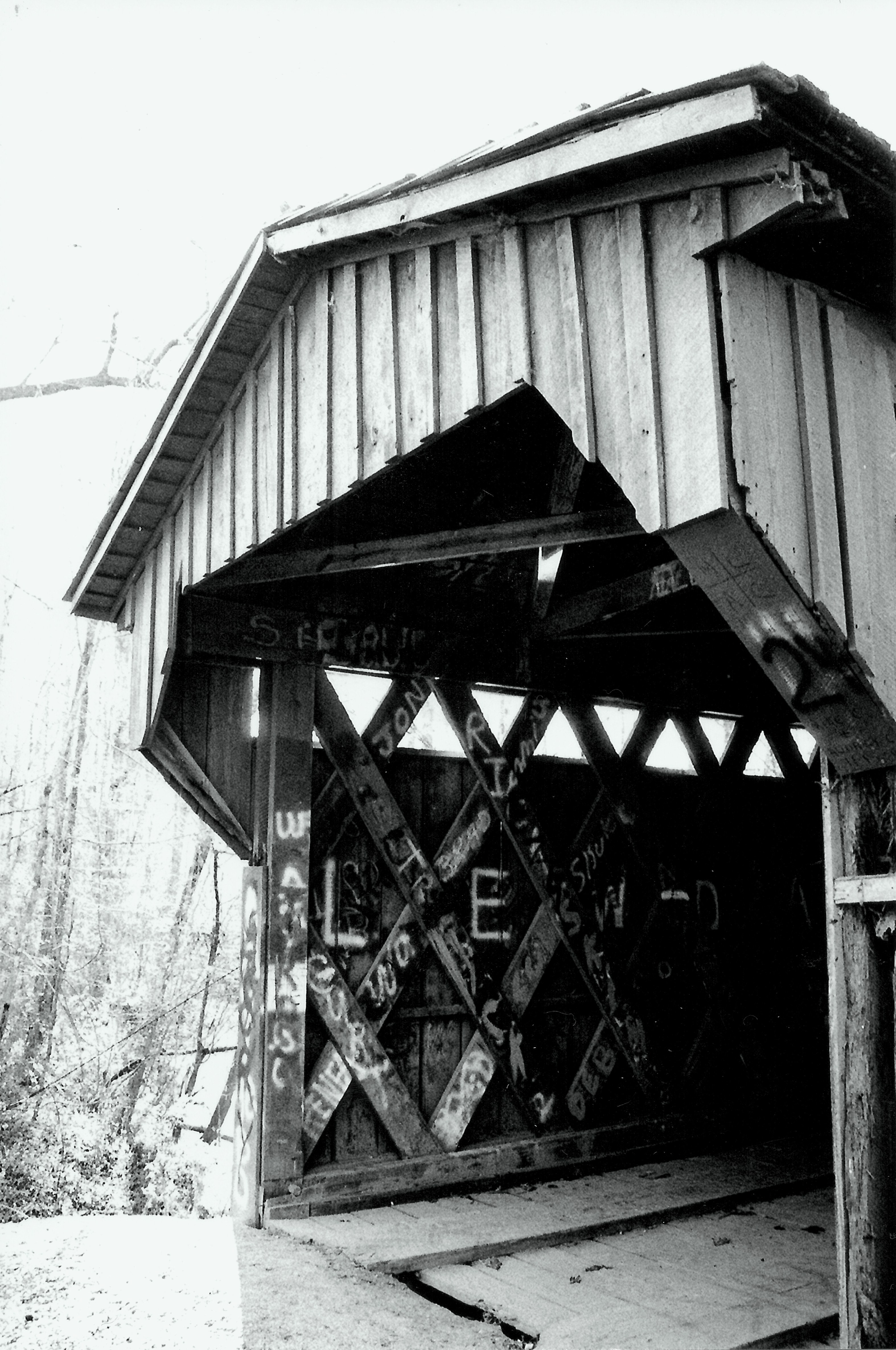
The Salem-Shotwell Covered Bridge in Salem, Alabama as it appeared in 2003

In the early morning hours of June 4, 2005, a severe thunderstorm passed through the Lee County area. High winds caused a tree to fall on the Salem-Shotwell Covered Bridge, causing major damage. The added weight collapsed the bridge into Wacoochee Creek later that day. Being the only historic covered bridge remaining in southeastern Alabama, the loss was heartbreaking. Most of the pieces were able to be recovered over the next few weeks and were stored at a vacant commercial building in Opelika until plans could be made regarding the future of the bridge.

After months of negotiations, the Lee County Commission approved to transfer ownership of what remained of the Salem-Shotwell Covered Bridge to the City of Opelika during a meeting held on October 31, 2005. An agreement was reached by the Lee County Historical Society and the Opelika Kiwanis Club to reconstruct the bridge over Rocky Brook at Opelika Municipal Park. A resolution was unanimously passed on April 4, 2006, by the Opelika City Council to assist with the bridge relocation and renovations. The project was spearheaded by the Opelika Kiwanis Club, who had already begun a donation drive to raise funds needed in order to proceed with the move. A number of individuals, businesses and organizations donated money for the greatly valued cause.

Reconstruction of Salem-Shotwell Covered Bridge eventually began on February 2, 2007, over a section of Rocky Brook which had already been cleared, graded and landscaped for foundation settlement. Due to the amount of usable original materials and in order to fit the new span, the bridge was shortened from 76 feet to 43 feet in length. The Town Lattice truss setup was kept, using many of the pieces which were recovered from Wacoochee Creek. A change was made to the exterior wooden sides covering the lattices, now just draping the bottom section so park visitors can view the brook and other surroundings from inside the bridge. On the original construction, in order to prevent damage from high water, most of the lattices were covered and only the top sections exposed for light. Two lights have been placed inside the bridge for nighttime illumination. The reconstruction project and final landscaping took about six months to complete at a cost of roughly $60,000.

On August 14, 2007, a ribbon-cutting ceremony was held at Opelika Municipal Park to re-open the Salem-Shotwell Covered Bridge to the public. A piece of history once again stands in Lee County. Current photos of the bridge as well as its reconstruction can be viewed on the Opelika Kiwanis Club website (linked below).

== Covered Bridge Hauntings ==
During its time over Wacoochee Creek, the Salem-Shotwell Covered Bridge was said to have been haunted by children who were killed in a motor vehicle accident near the bridge a number of years ago. Many locals state though that no such incident ever happened. There was a girl who was strangled on the bridge, confirmed by local police officers who had worked the crime scene.

== See also ==
- List of Alabama covered bridges
