= Apple River (Wisconsin) =

Coordinates: 45.14774°N 92.74798°W

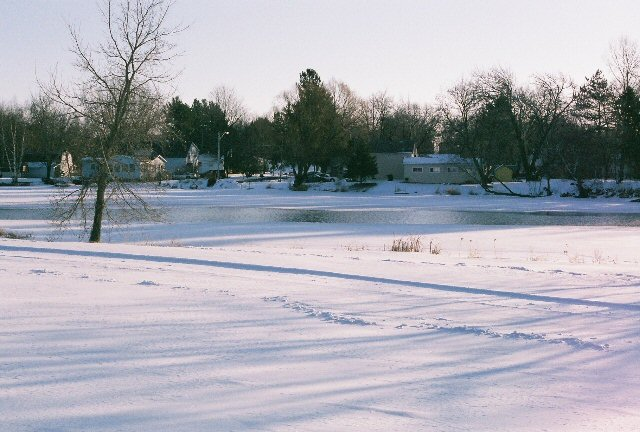
- Apple River in Amery, Wisconsin

Location
- Country: United States

Physical characteristics
- Source
  - location: Wisconsin
- Length: 77.5 mi (124.7 km)
- Basin size: St. Croix–Mississippi

The Apple River is a 77.5-mile-long (124.7 km) tributary of the St. Croix River in northwestern Wisconsin in the United States. Via the St. Croix, it is part of the watershed of the Mississippi River.

== Etymology ==
In the Ojibwe language, the Apple River is called Waabiziipiniikaan-ziibi, meaning "River Abundant with Swan Potatoes". This name was translated into French, but only pomme (apple) of the French word for "potato" (pomme de terre—"apple from the earth") was translated into English.

== Geography ==
It issues from Staples Lake in Barron County and flows generally southwestwardly through Polk and St. Croix counties. In northern Polk County, it gathers the Fox Creek near White Ash Lake and traverses several lakes throughout its course. The river flows through the city of Amery and the villages of Star Prairie and Somerset. It joins the St. Croix River 7 miles (11 km) northeast of Stillwater, Minnesota.

== History ==
The Apple River was once an important route of trade for the logging industry; timber was floated downstream from logging camps in the north to a sawmill in Amery, Wisconsin where it was cut, loaded onto trains and transported throughout the region. Today, the river generates tourism revenue through recreation and resorts, attracting 500,000 visitors a year. Its relatively gentle rapids make it very popular for canoeing, tubing, camping, concerts, and is a popular fishing spot through all seasons.

In 2022, five people were stabbed in the Town of Somerset along the river, with one person, 17-year-old Isaac Schuman being killed. The perpetrator, Nicolae Miu, was sentenced to 20 years imprisonment for Schuman’s murder.

== See also ==
- List of Wisconsin rivers
