= Straight Lake State Park =

Lake and State Park in Polk County, Wisconsin

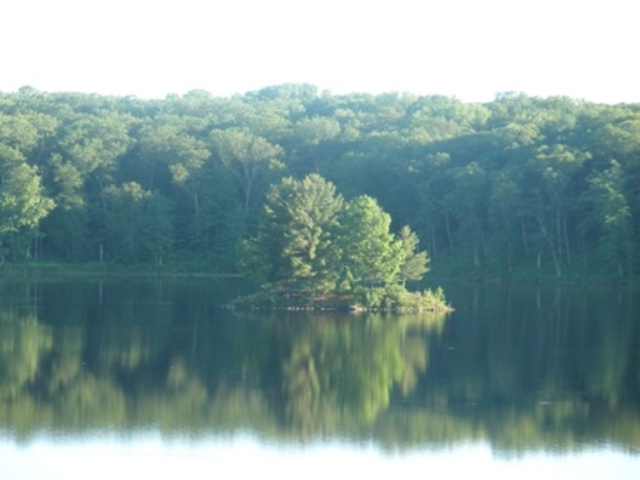
- Wooded island on Straight Lake

- Location within Wisconsin Location within the United States
- Interactive map of Straight Lake State Park
- Location: Polk County, Wisconsin, United States
- Coordinates: 45°36′17″N 92°24′47″W
- Area: 2,780 acres (1,130 ha)
- Elevation: 1,211 ft (369 m)
- Established: 2002
- Administrator: Wisconsin Department of Natural Resources
- Website: Official website
- Wisconsin State Parks

Straight Lake State Park is a 2,780-acre (1,130 ha) Wisconsin state park north of the village of Luck, Wisconsin. Straight Lake State Park was established in 2002. The park is traversed by the Ice Age National Scenic Trail, which runs along the northern shore of Straight Lake before following the course of the Straight River through the Straight River Tunnel Channel. The Clam Falls Trail, an abandoned road that served as an important thoroughfare during the logging era, also traverses the park roughly parallel to the Ice Age Trail.

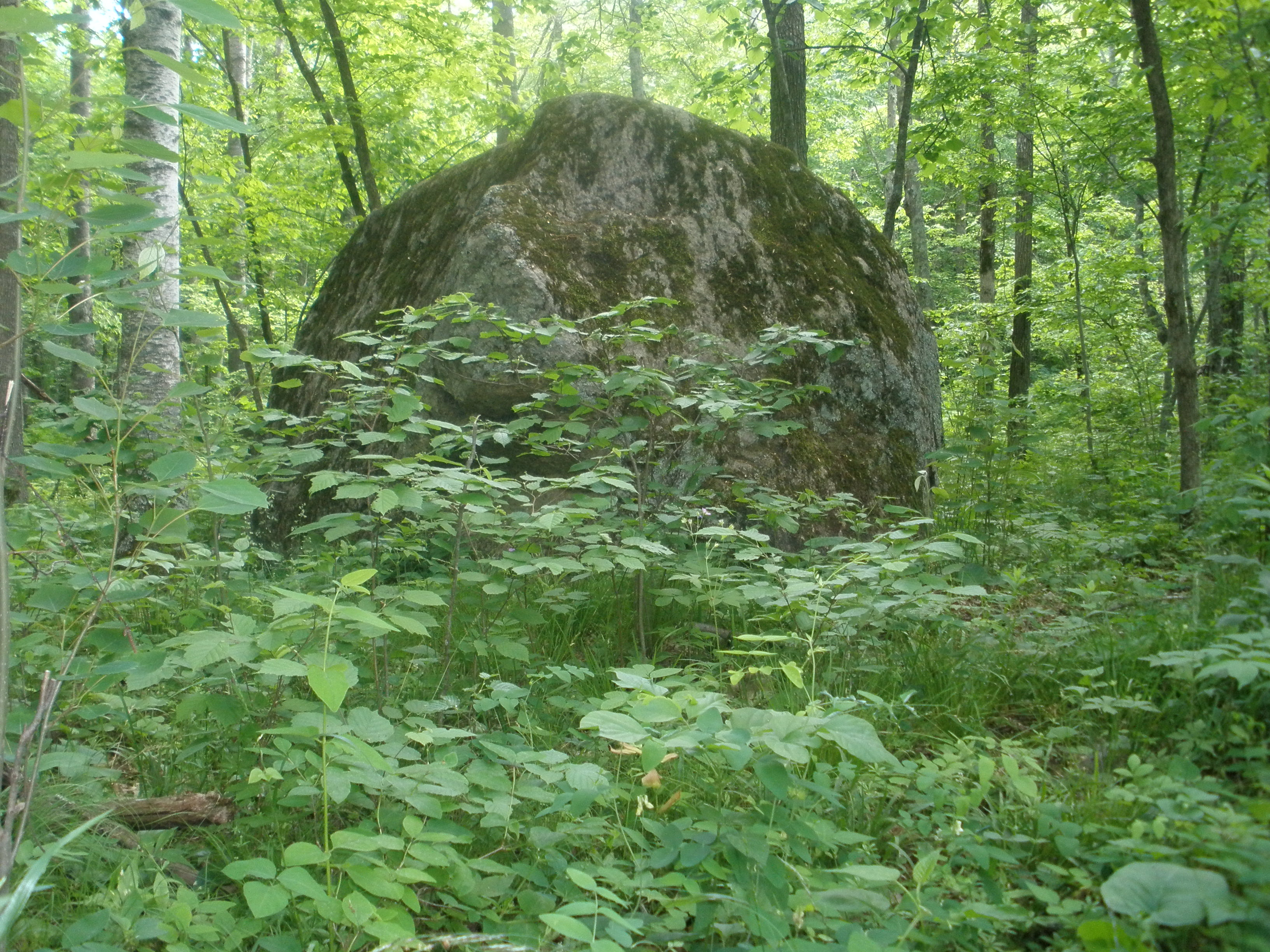
Large glacial erratics can be found throughout the park
