= Star Prairie, Wisconsin =

- Village
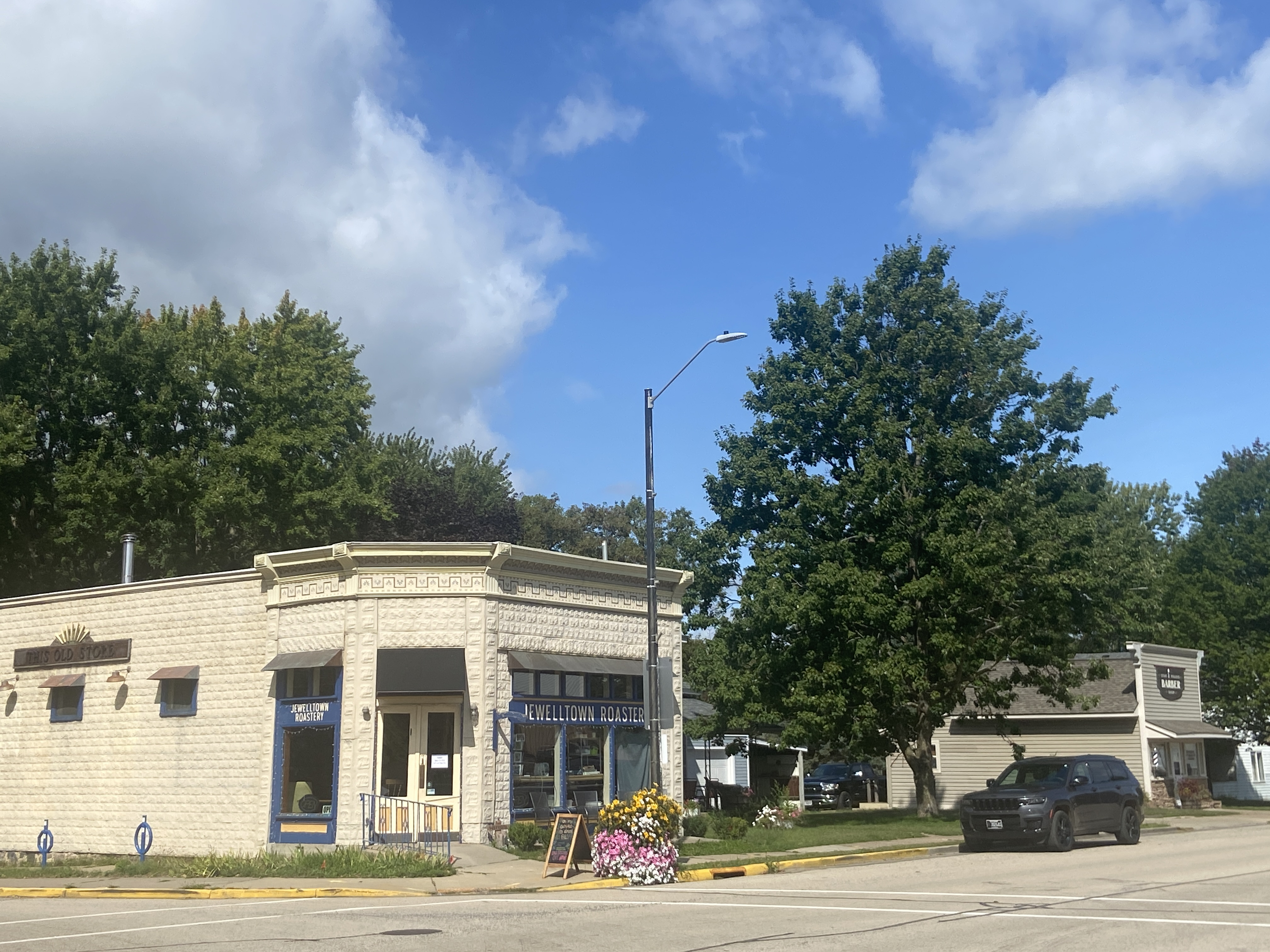
- Businesses on Main Street

- Location of Star Prairie in St. Croix County, Wisconsin
- Coordinates: 45°11′53″N 92°31′55″W
- Country: United States
- State: Wisconsin
- County: St. Croix

Area
  - Total: 2.14 sq mi (5.55 km^{2})
  - Land: 2.14 sq mi (5.55 km^{2})
  - Water: 0 sq mi (0.00 km^{2})
- Elevation: 879 ft (268 m)

Population (2020)
  - Total: 678
  - Density: 316/sq mi (122/km^{2})
- Time zone: UTC-6 (Central (CST))
  - Summer (DST): UTC-5 (CDT)
- Area codes: 715 & 534
- FIPS code: 55-76850
- GNIS feature ID: 1581735
- Website: villageofstarprairie.com

Star Prairie is a village in St. Croix County in the U.S. state of Wisconsin. The population was 678 at the 2020 census. The village is located along the Apple River on the boundary between the Town of Star Prairie and the Town of Stanton.

== Geography ==
Star Prairie is located at 45°11′53″N 92°31′55″W (45.198274, -92.531987).

According to the United States Census Bureau, the village has a total area of 2.16 square miles (5.59 km^{2}), all land. The Apple River flows through the center of town, where it is joined by a small stream called Saratoga Spring.

Wisconsin Highway 65, County Road H, and County Road M are main routes in the community. County Road C passes nearby.

== Demographics ==
Historical population
| Census | Pop. | Note | %± |
|---|---|---|---|
| 1910 | 253 | | — |
| 1920 | 265 | | 4.7% |
| 1930 | 250 | | −5.7% |
| 1940 | 250 | | 0.0% |
| 1950 | 288 | | 15.2% |
| 1960 | 331 | | 14.9% |
| 1970 | 362 | | 9.4% |
| 1980 | 420 | | 16.0% |
| 1990 | 507 | | 20.7% |
| 2000 | 574 | | 13.2% |
| 2010 | 561 | | −2.3% |
| 2020 | 678 | | 20.9% |
U.S. Decennial Census

=== 2010 census ===
At the 2010 census there were 561 people, 230 households, and 155 families in the village. The population density was 259.7 inhabitants per square mile (100.3/km^{2}). There were 248 housing units at an average density of 114.8 per square mile (44.3/km^{2}). The racial makup of the village was 96.6% White, 1.4% Native American, 0.9% Asian, and 1.1% from two or more races. Hispanic or Latino of any race were 1.6%.

Of the 230 households 33.5% had children under the age of 18 living with them, 47.4% were married couples living together, 12.2% had a female householder with no husband present, 7.8% had a male householder with no wife present, and 32.6% were non-families. 27.8% of households were one person and 7.8% were one person aged 65 or older. The average household size was 2.44 and the average family size was 2.95.

The median age in the village was 36.1 years. 26.7% of residents were under the age of 18; 6.9% were between the ages of 18 and 24; 27.5% were from 25 to 44; 26.4% were from 45 to 64; and 12.5% were 65 or older. The gender makeup of the village was 50.8% male and 49.2% female.

=== 2000 census ===
At the 2000 census there were 574 people, 212 households, and 145 families in the village. The population density was 273.3 inhabitants per square mile (105.5/km^{2}). There were 215 housing units at an average density of 102.4 per square mile (39.5/km^{2}). The racial makup of the village was 97.74% White, 0.17% Black or African American and 2.09% Asian. 0.17%. were Hispanic or Latino of any race.

Of the 212 households 38.2% had children under the age of 18 living with them, 56.1% were married couples living together, 9.0% had a female householder with no husband present, and 31.6% were non-families. 23.6% of households were one person and 9.0% were one person aged 65 or older. The average household size was 2.71 and the average family size was 3.28.

The age distribution was 28.0% under the age of 18, 11.3% from 18 to 24, 35.0% from 25 to 44, 17.1% from 45 to 64, and 8.5% 65 or older. The median age was 32 years. For every 100 females, there were 98.6 males. For every 100 females age 18 and over, there were 102.5 males.

The median household income was $48,750 and the median family income was $49,000. Males had a median income of $36,583 versus $22,679 for females. The per capita income for the village was $19,414. About 2.9% of families and 4.0% of the population were below the poverty line, including 3.9% of those under age 18 and 4.9% of those age 65 or over.

== Gallery ==
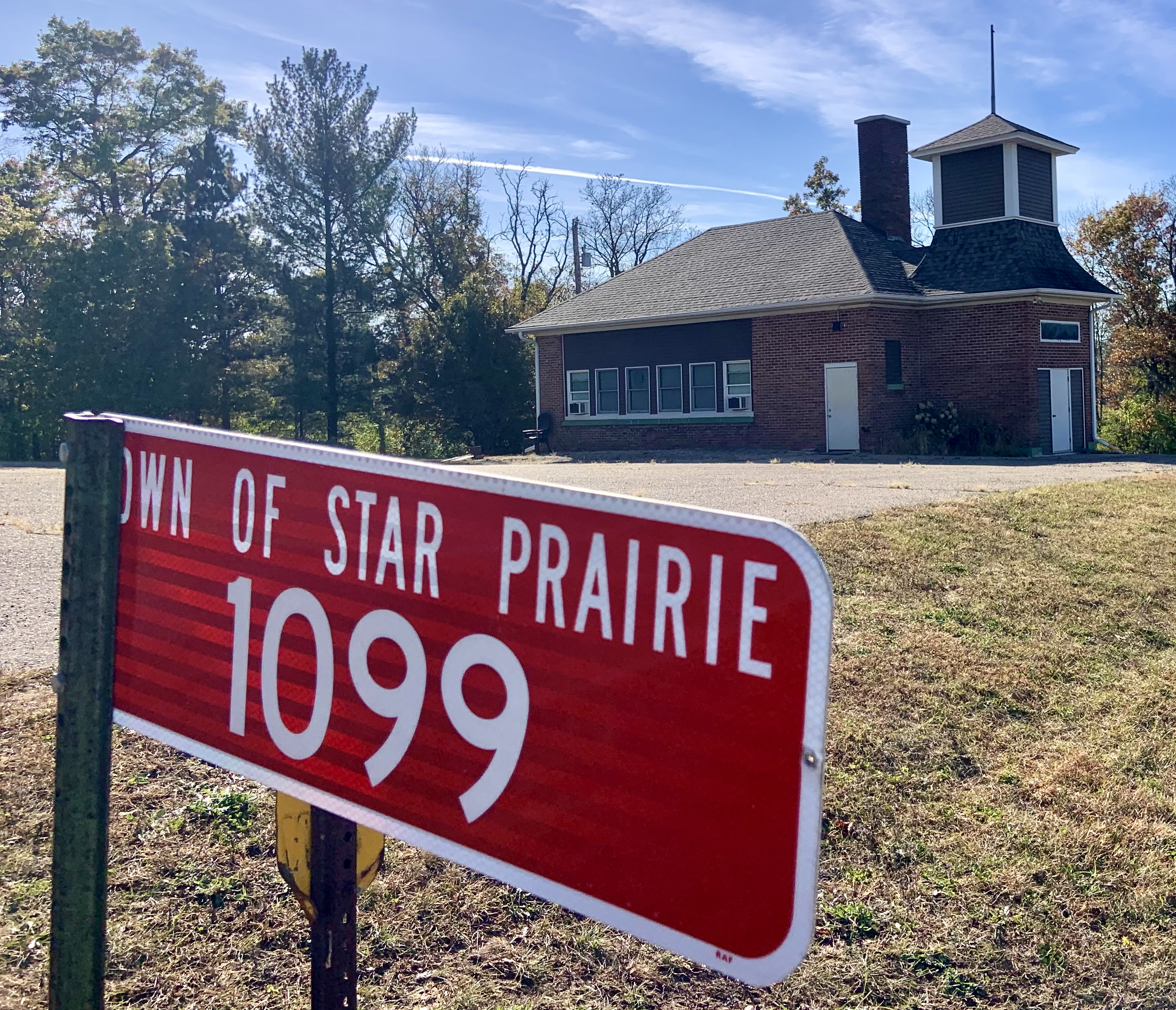
Town Hall

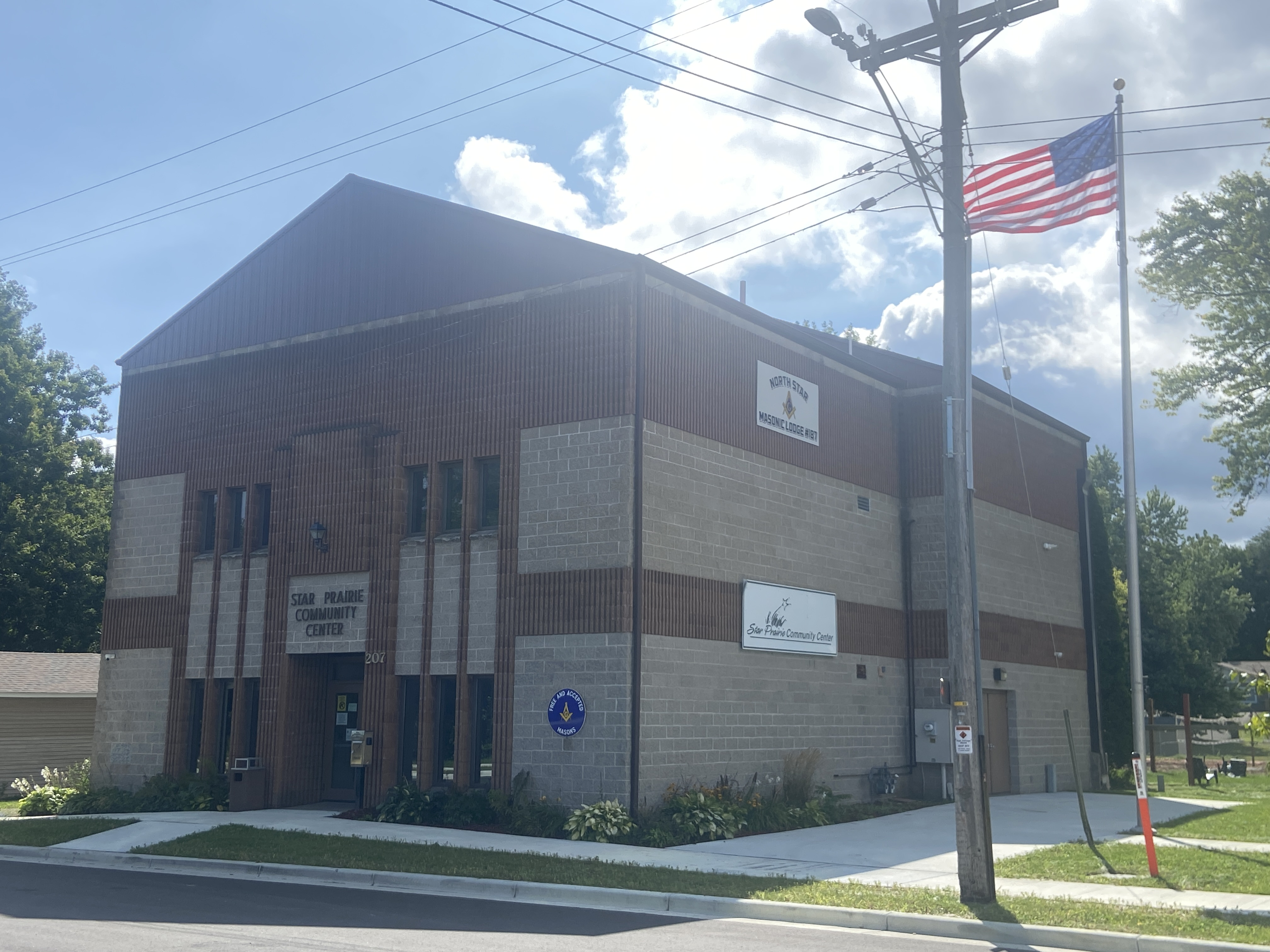
Community Center

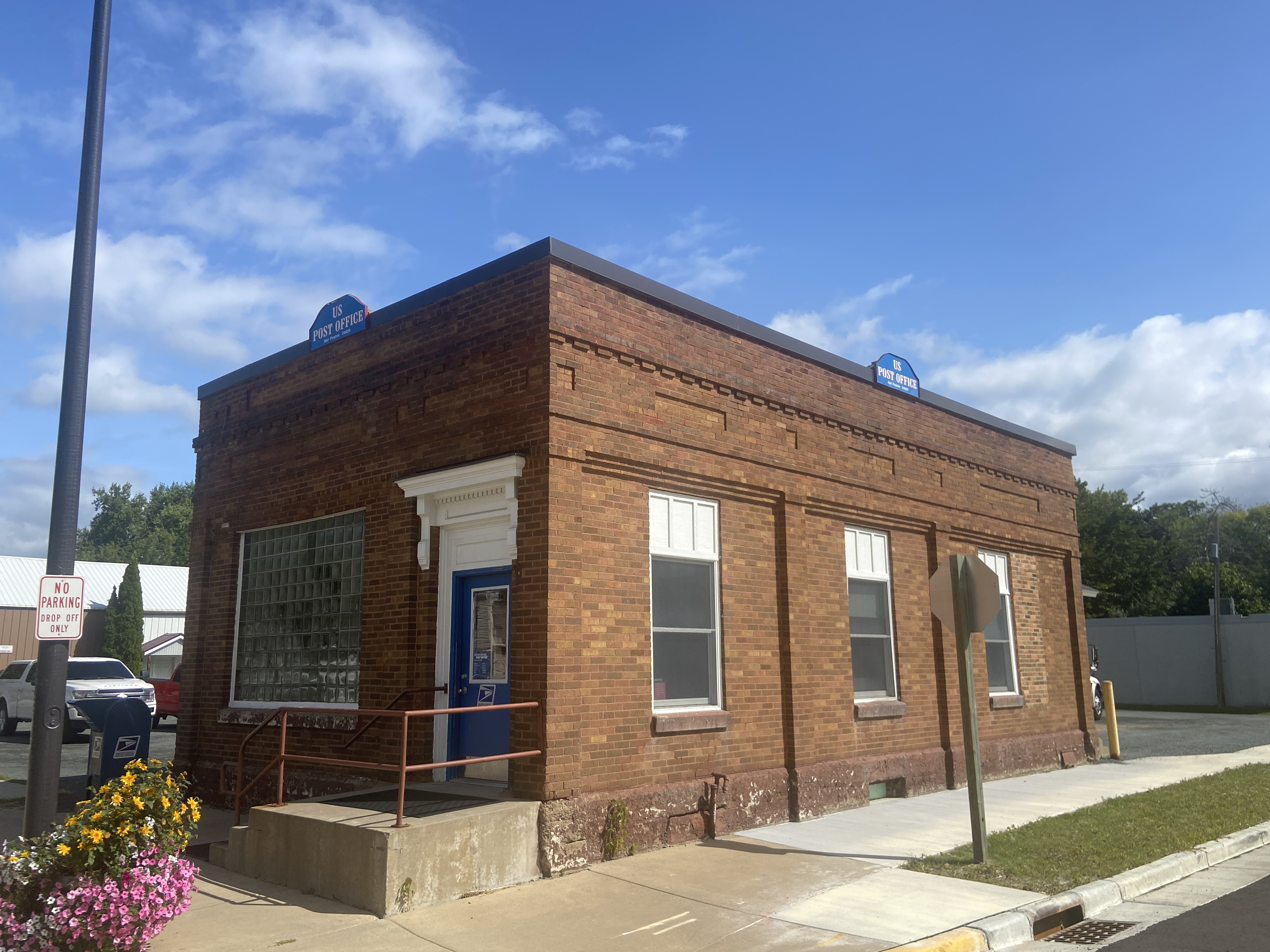
Post Office

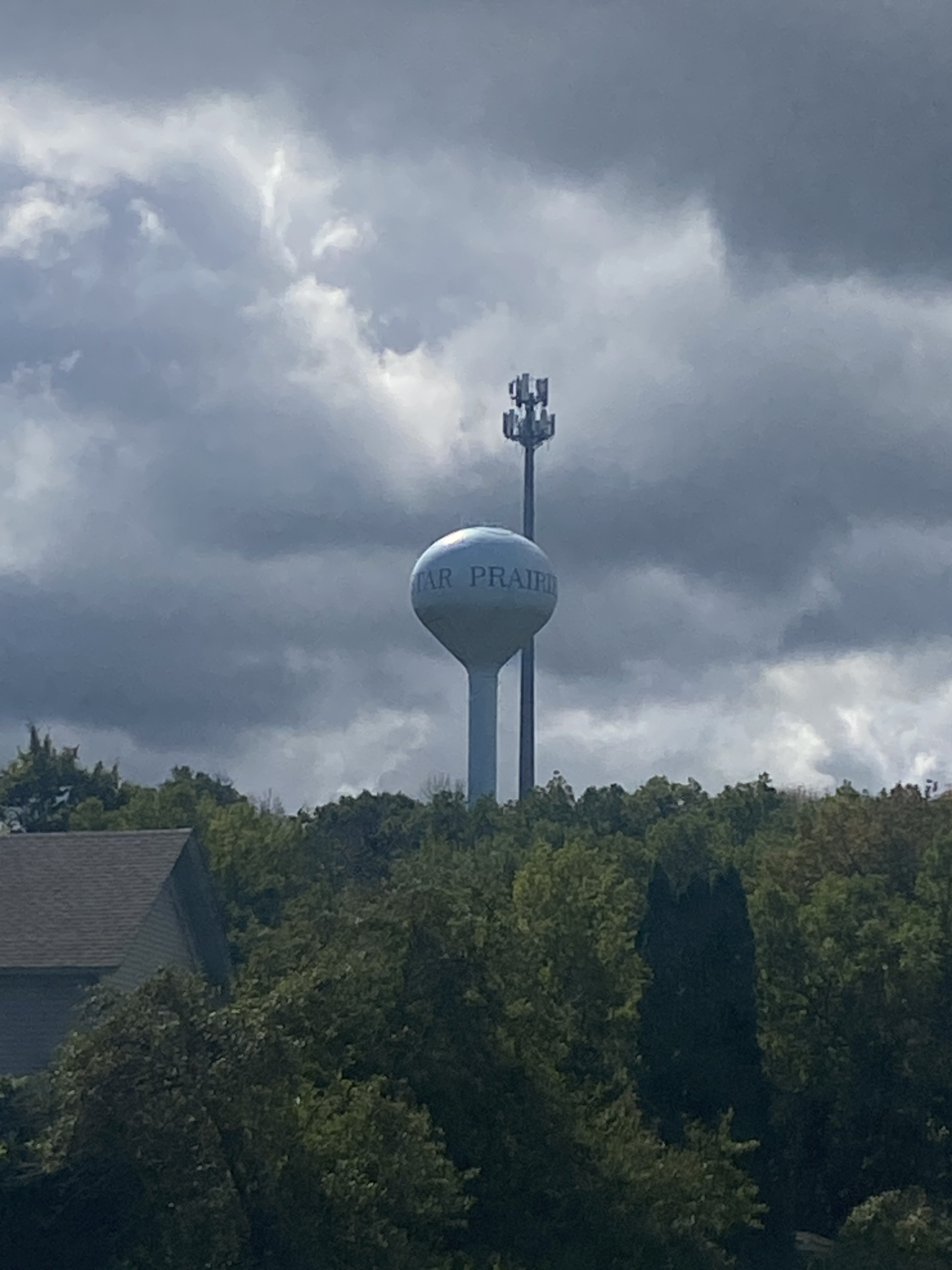
Water tower
