= Bone Lake (Wisconsin) =

- Location: Polk County, Wisconsin
- Coordinates: 45°32′02″N 92°23′34″W
- Type: Lake
- Primary outflows: Fox Creek
- Managing agency: Bone Lake Management District
- Surface area: 6.75 km^{2} (2.61 sq mi)
- Shore length^{1}: 20.11 km (12.50 mi)

Location
- ^{1} Shore length is not a well-defined measure.

Bone Lake is a 1,667-acre (675 ha) drainage lake located in Polk County, Wisconsin. The lake has a maximum depth of 43 ft (13 m) with an average depth of 20 ft (6.1 m) and drains into Fox Creek. The lake and its surrounding area provide habitat to a number of species, and recent efforts have been taken to control potentially invasive species. The lake is managed by the Bone Lake Management District, while fisheries laws are enforced by the Wisconsin Department of Natural Resources.

== History ==
The modern lake is a product of the Last Ice Age and is located in an area historically controlled by the Ojibwe (Chippewa) who called the lake "Onondogacona". The natives in this area maintained numerous mound sites, some of which are preserved today by the Wisconsin Historical Society. Following the Treaty of July 29, 1837 (7 Stat. 536) which was proclaimed on June 15, 1838, the land was ceded to the United States of America. The treaty included phrases ensuring that this land could be used by European settlers for hunting, trapping, and fishing.

By the 20th century, Polk County was settled by a new wave of European immigrants. These migrants, mostly from Germany, Switzerland, Austria, and Italy, focused on industry related to agriculture and timber. By the 20th century, the area surrounding the lake had been privatized, with the lake's shoreline slated to become highly desirable real estate. By 2000, nearly all of the 12.5 mi (20.1 km) of shoreline was privately owned. Between May and November 2014, officials conducted a targeted herbicide treatment, aimed at reducing issues caused by curly-leaf pondweed. In 2024, zebra mussels, a highly invasive species from Asia, were first spotted in the lake, and ongoing efforts are under way to control their population.

== Habitat ==
Bone Lake's watershed is predominantly forests (48%) and agriculture (20%). The lake and its surrounding area provide habitat to a number of species of flora and fauna, including:

- Muskellunge
- Largemouth bass
- Smallmouth bass
- Northern pike
- Bluegill
- Pumpkinseed
- Crappie
- Yellow perch
- White sucker
- Bullhead
- Golden shiner
- Green frog
- Wood frog
- American toad
- Spotted salamander
- Blue-spotted salamander
- Eastern newt
- Mallard duck
- Canada goose
- Great blue heron
- Green heron
- Red-tailed hawk
- Osprey
- Dogwood
- Sugar maple
- Red maple
- Basswood
- Elderberry
