= Salem, Alabama =

Unincorporated community in Alabama, United States

- Unincorporated community
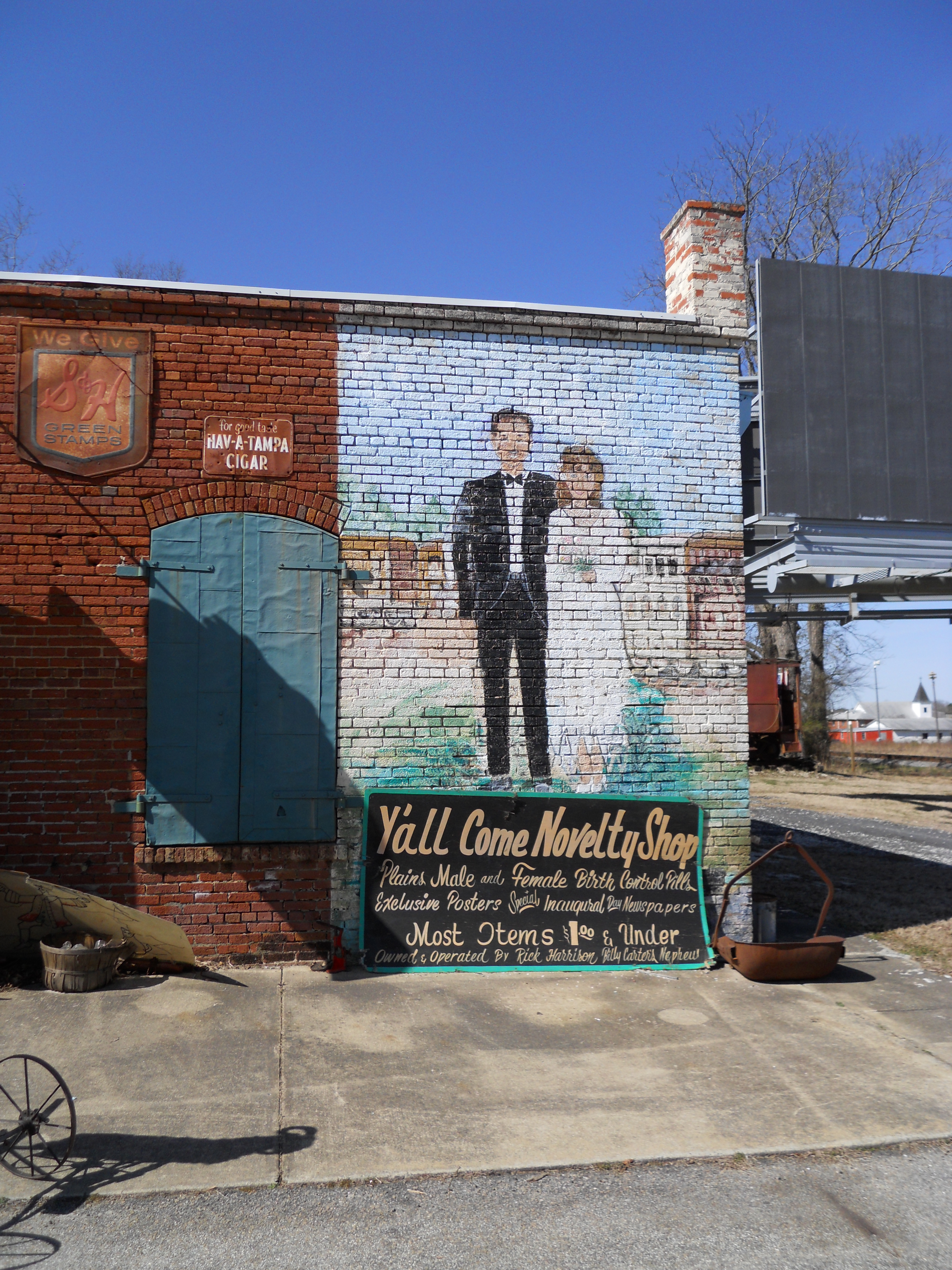
- The Y'all Come Novelty Shop in Salem's business district

- Location within Alabama Location within the United States
- Coordinates: 32°35′48″N 85°14′19″W
- Country: United States
- State: Alabama
- Counties: Lee

Area
  - Total: 115.3 sq mi (299 km^{2})

Population (July 2007)
  - Total: 6,428
  - Density: 66/sq mi (25/km^{2})
- Time zone: UTC-6 (CST)
  - Summer (DST): UTC-5 (CDT)
- ZIP code: 36874
- Area code: 334
- GNIS feature ID: 126233

Salem is an unincorporated community east-centrally located in Lee County, Alabama, United States. It lies along U.S. Routes 280 and 431 between Opelika and Phenix City. It is part of the Auburn Metropolitan Area.

== History ==
Salem was first settled in 1835, and grew rapidly for the next two decades. Salem incorporated in 1846 and quickly became one of the area's largest cities. However, a fire which engulfed the town in 1854 and the subsequent Civil War resulted in the collapse of the town's government, and rapid depopulation. Salem lost a bid to be the county seat of the newly formed Lee County in 1865, and then saw its charter become inactive in the following decades. Today, Salem is a small unincorporated community of a few hundred.

By the late 20th century Salem was the location of Lee County's only covered bridge, the Salem-Shotwell Covered Bridge. A symbol of the area, the bridge was destroyed by a fallen tree following a storm on June 4, 2005 . It was rebuilt in 2007 at Opelika Municipal Park in nearby Opelika.

A post office operating under the name Salem was first opened in 1839.

== Tornado of 2009 ==
On February 28, 2009, at about 8:30 a.m., an EF2 tornado touched down in Salem, destroying Salem Chapel AME church, several homes and part of Wacoochee Junior High School. It also destroyed the Anglican Church of the Resurrection, ACA Mission in the middle of downtown Salem. The church was completed in 2008 in the building that most people knew as the old McLain Museum. This building had been used for several other businesses over many years. The tornado ran east-northeast across part of U.S. Highway 280, which runs through the small community, before lifting up two miles to the east. There were no fatalities and no major injuries reported.

== Gallery ==
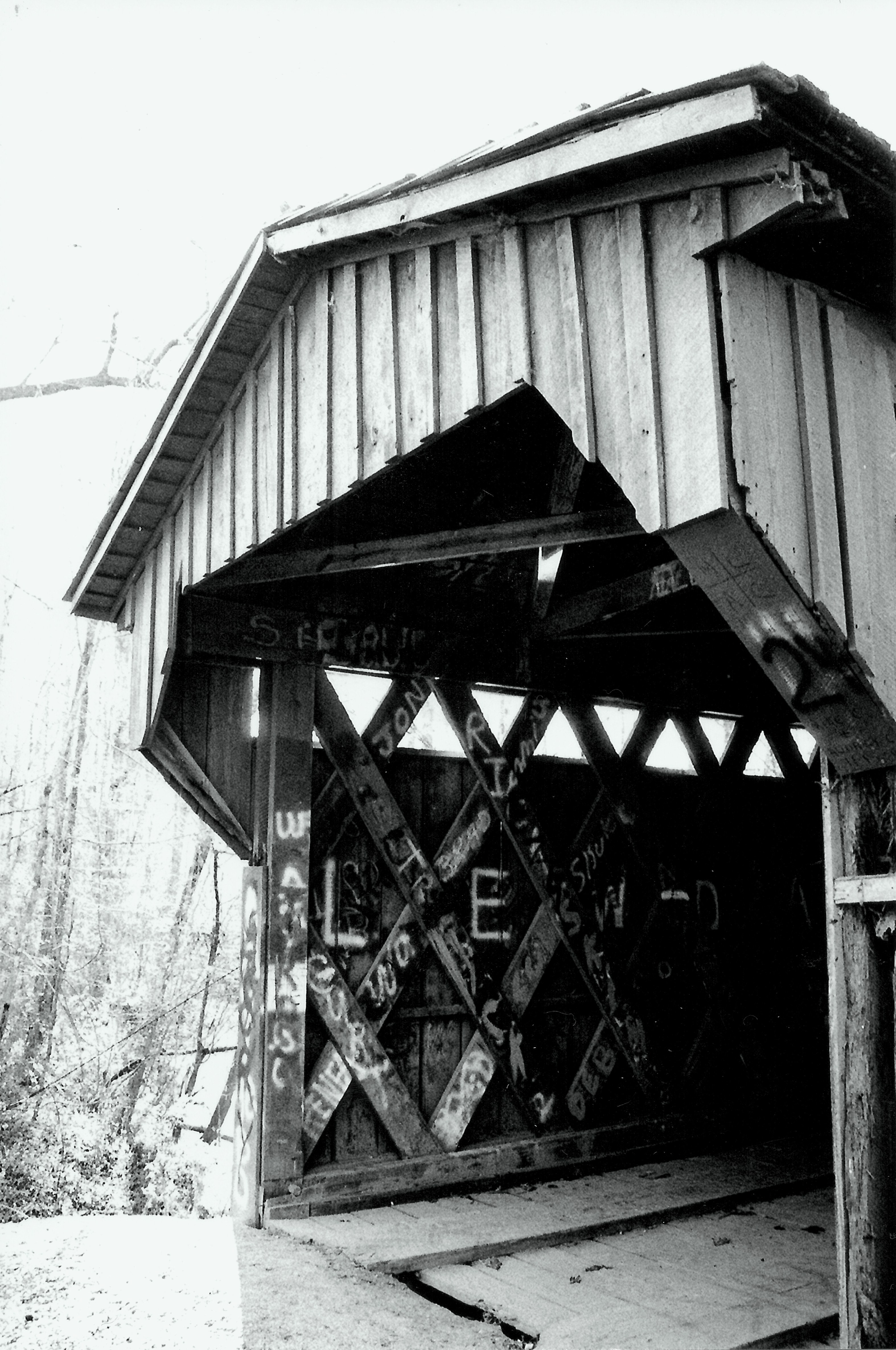
The Salem-Shotwell Covered Bridge in Salem, Alabama as it appeared in 2003

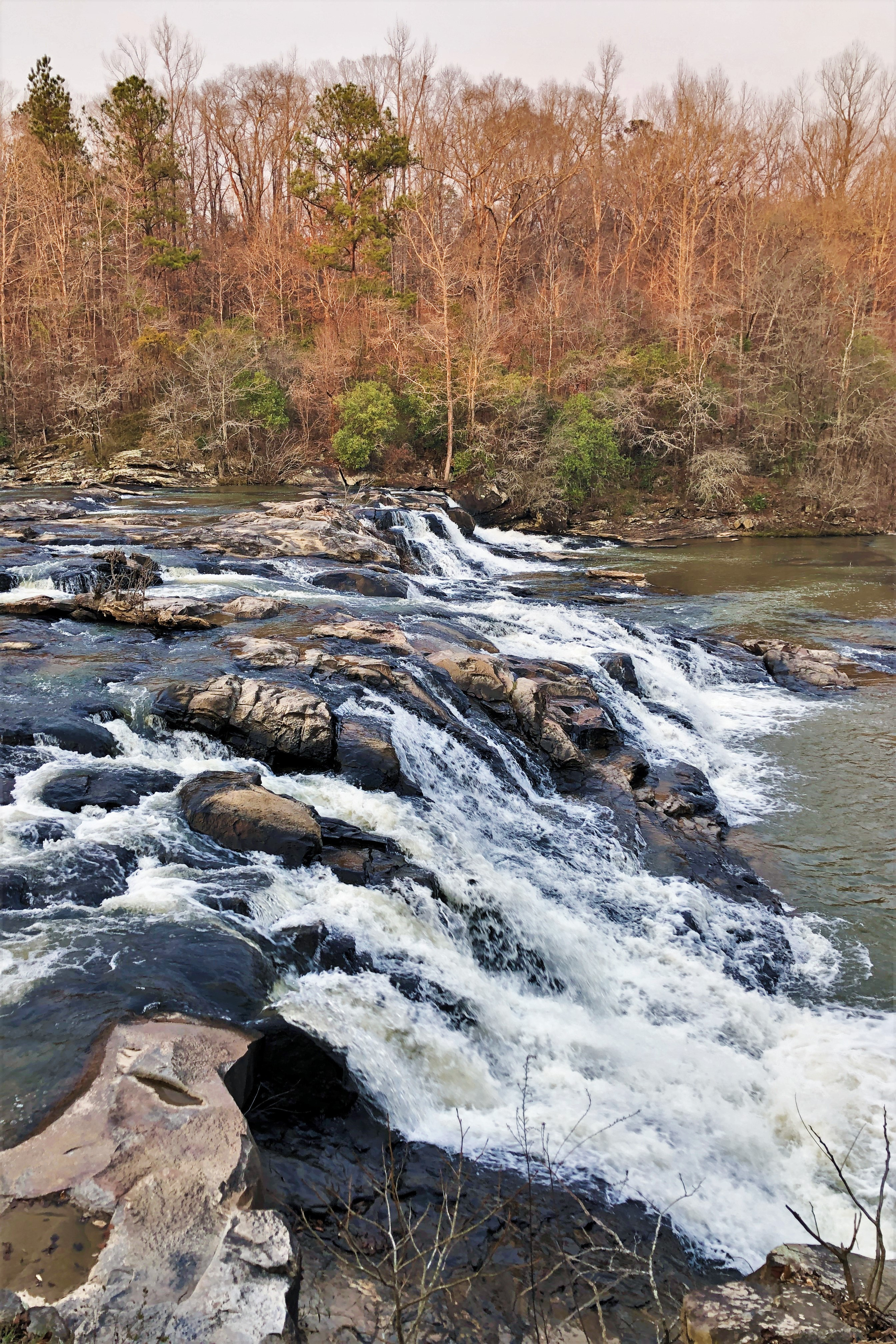
The falls at Moffit's Mill on Uchee Creek near Salem

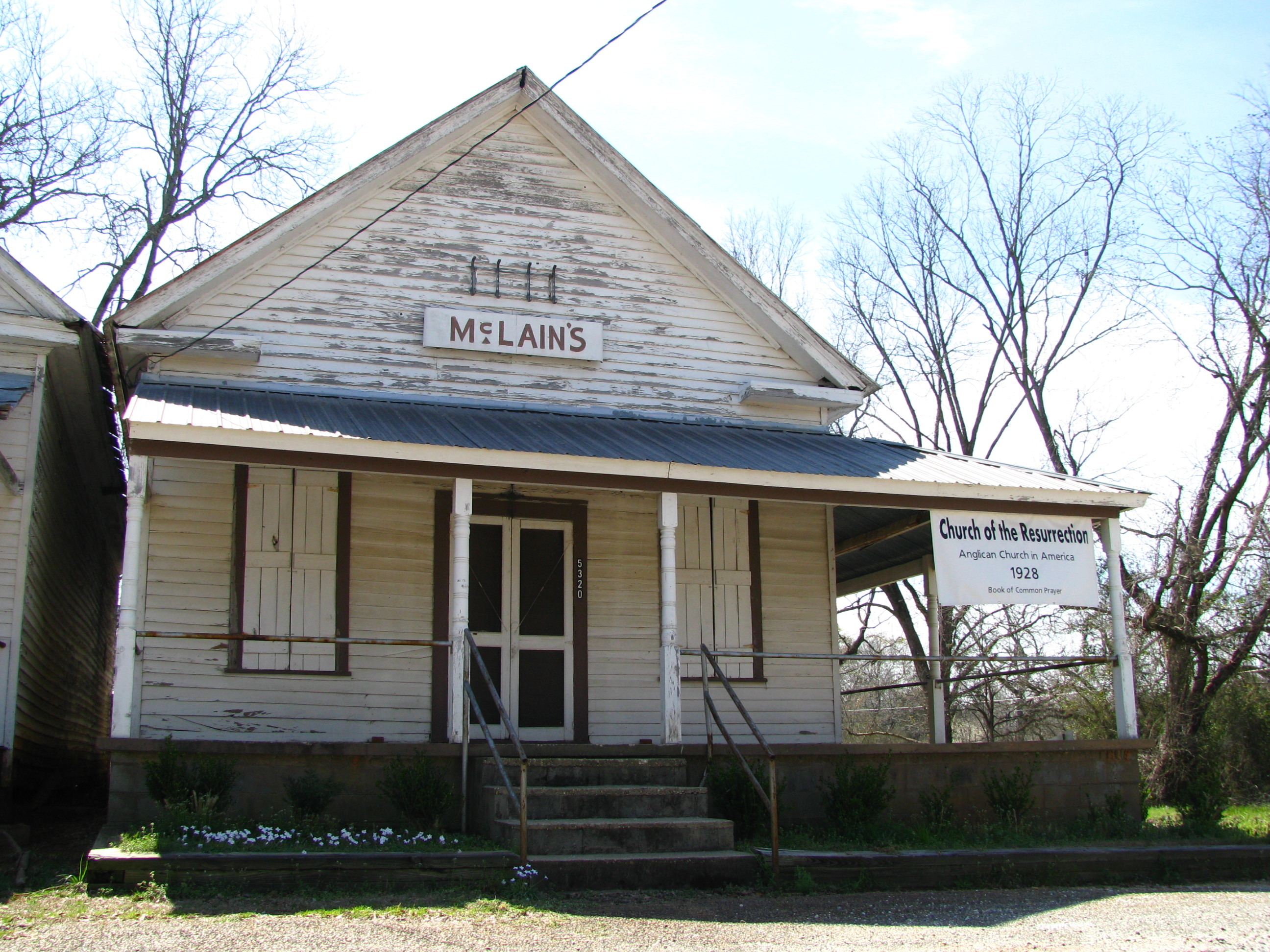
Dr. Andrew McLain's Office & Drug Store, destroyed by a tornado in 2009, was listed on the National Register of Historic Places.

== Notable people ==
- Lil Cory, Rapper
