= Wisconsin's 29th Senate district =

American legislative district in north-central Wisconsin

Wisconsin's 29th State Senate district
- 2024 map defined in 2023 Wisc. Act 94; 2022 map defined in Johnson v. Wisconsin Elections Commission; 2011 map was defined in 2011 Wisc. Act 43 composed of Assembly districts 85, 86, and 87
Senator
Cory Tomczyk; R–Mosinee
since January 2, 2023 (3 years, 55 days)
- Demographics: 90.4% White; 1.04% Black; 2.05% Hispanic; 4.38% Asian; 1.57% Native American; 0.1% Hawaiian/Pacific Islander
- Population (2020) • Voting age: 178,059; 138,817
- Website: Official website
- Notes: North-central Wisconsin

The 29th Senate district of Wisconsin is one of 33 districts in the Wisconsin Senate. Located in north-central Wisconsin, the district comprises most of Marathon County, along with northern Wood County, and parts of northern Portage County, northwest Waupaca County, and western Shawano County. The district includes the cities of Wausau, Marathon City, Marshfield, and Mosinee.

== Current elected officials ==
Cory Tomczyk is the senator representing the 29th district since January 2023.

Each Wisconsin State Senate district is composed of three Wisconsin State Assembly districts. The 29th Senate district comprises the 85th, 86th, and 87th Assembly districts. The current representatives of those districts are:

- Assembly District 85: Patrick Snyder (R–Weston)
- Assembly District 86: John Spiros (R–Marshfield)
- Assembly District 87: Brent Jacobson (R–Mosinee)

The district, in its current boundaries, crosses three congressional districts. The portion of the district in Waupaca and Shawano counties falls within Wisconsin's 8th congressional district, which is represented by U.S. Representative Mike Gallagher. The portion of the district in Portage and eastern Wood counties falls within Wisconsin's 3rd congressional district, represented by Derrick Van Orden. The remainder of the district falls within Wisconsin's 7th congressional district, represented by Tom Tiffany.

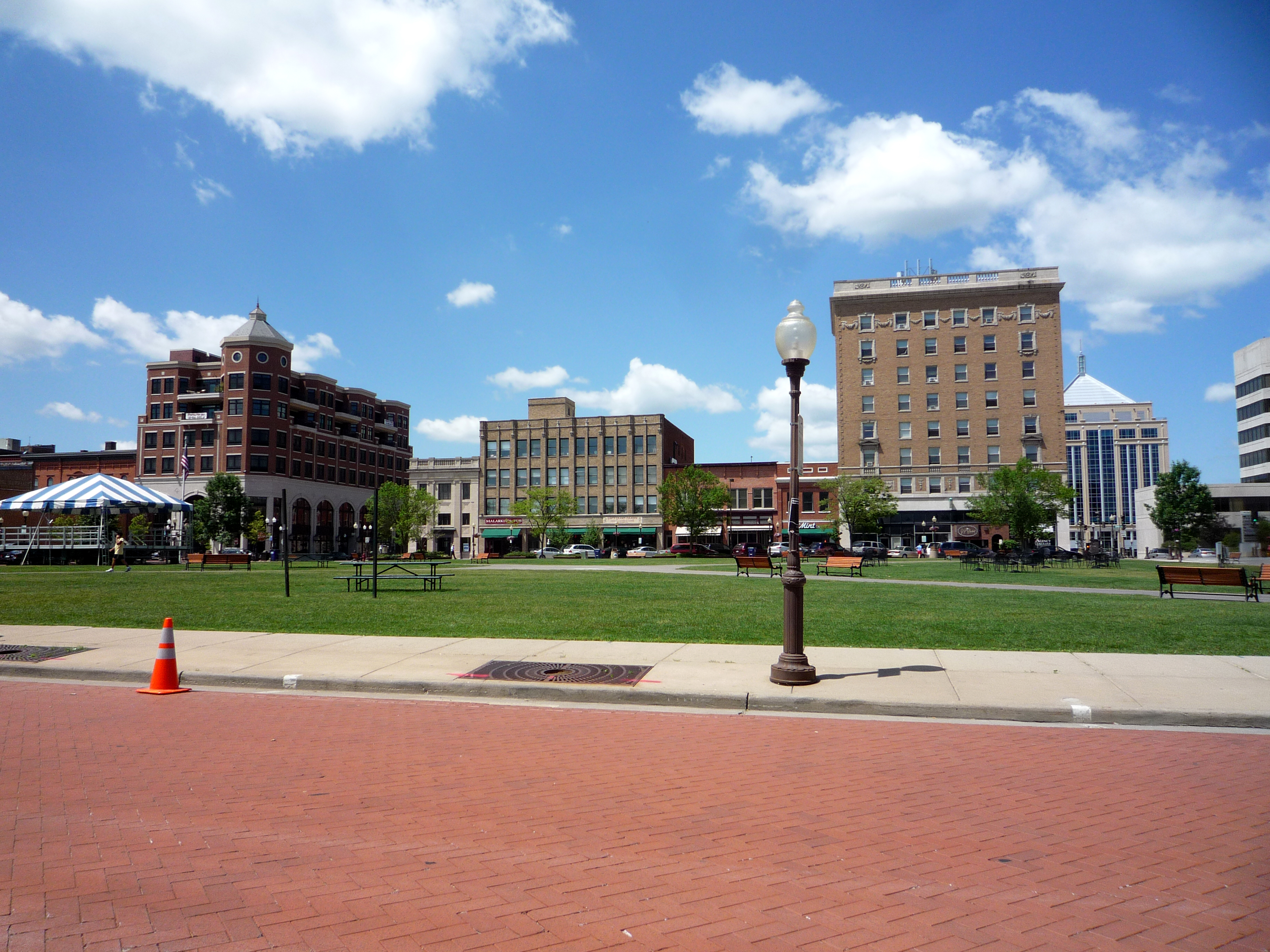
Downtown Wausau

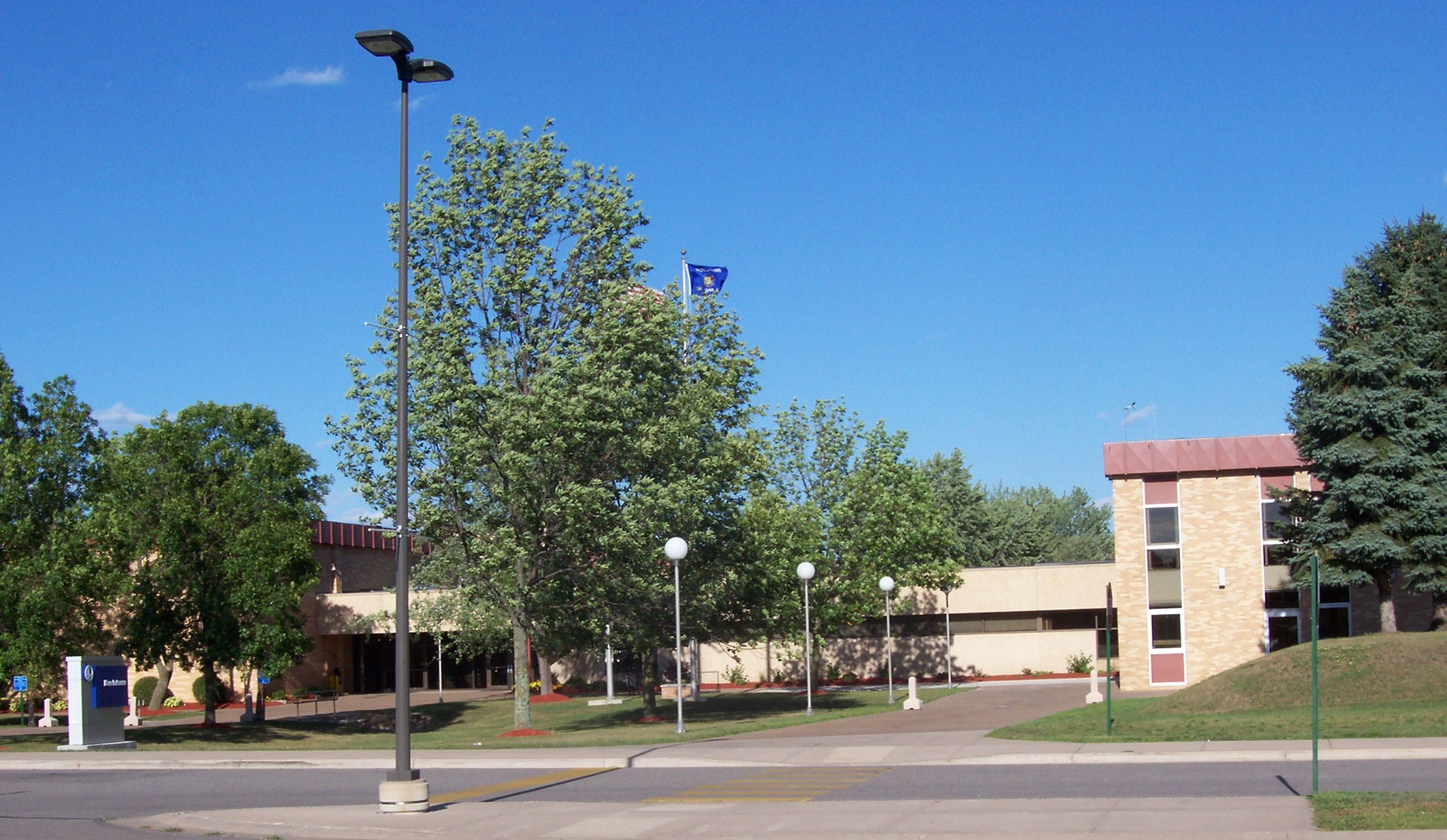
Northcentral Technical College in Wausau

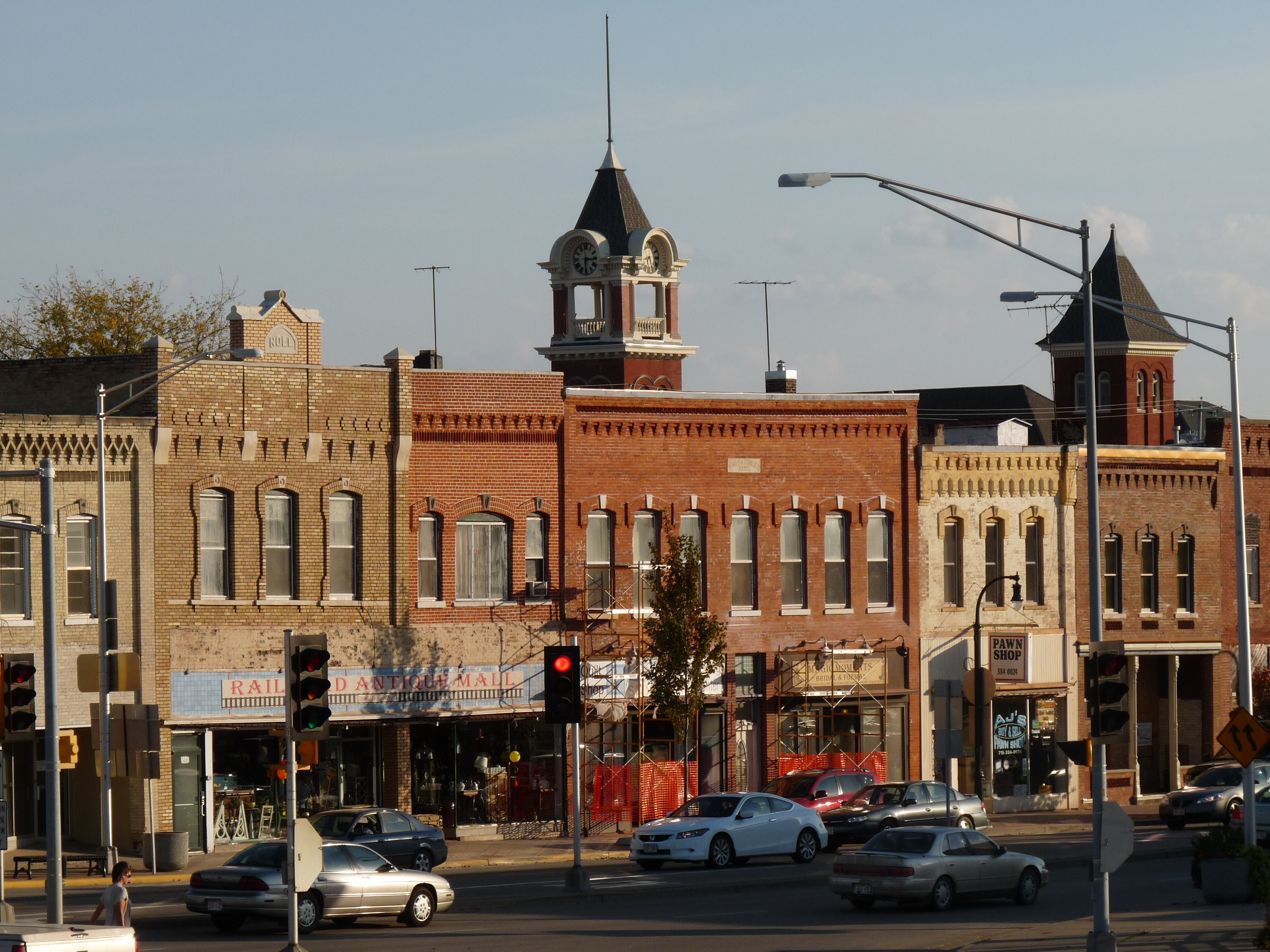
Marshfield Central Avenue Historic District

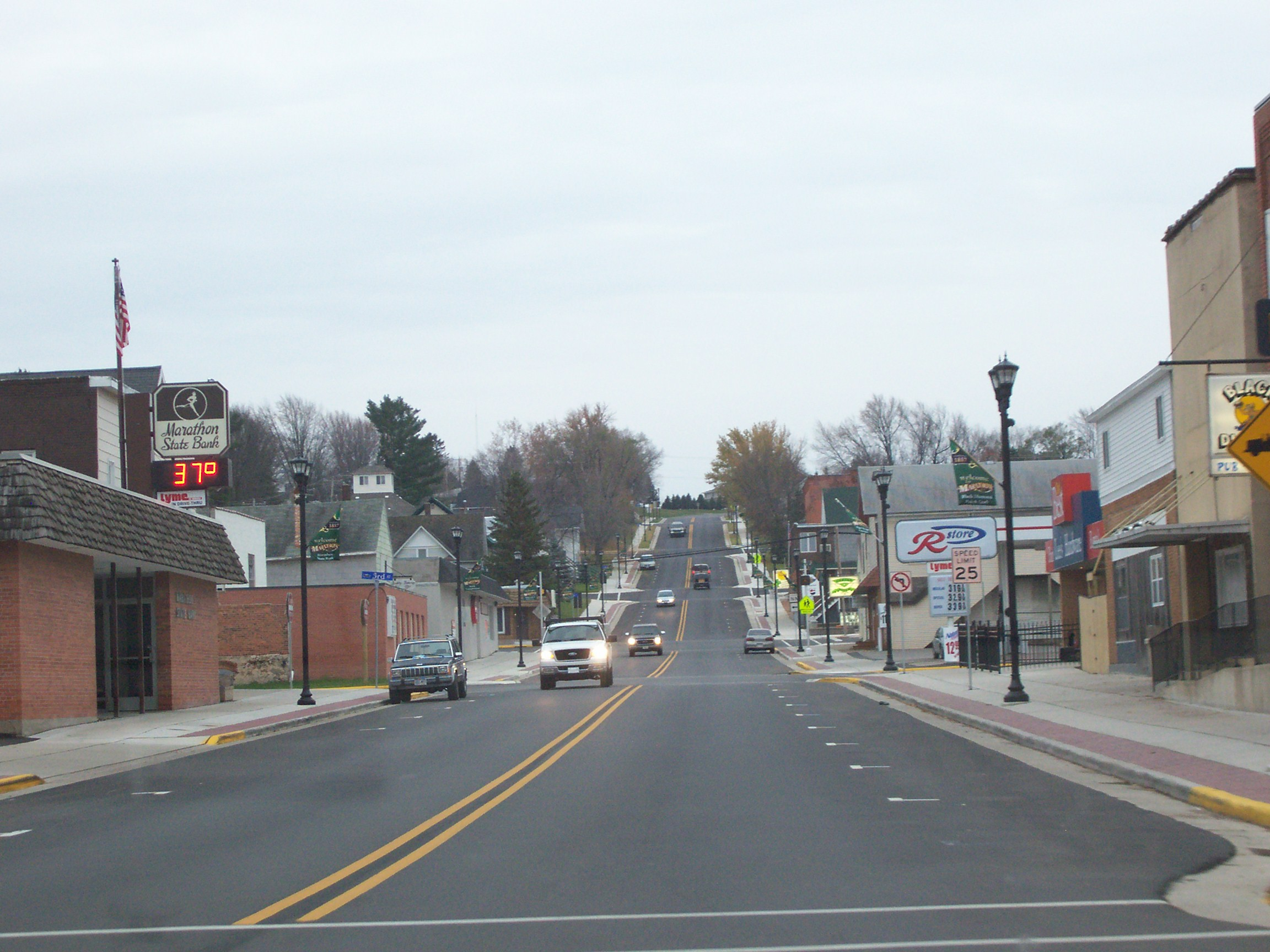
Downtown Marathon City

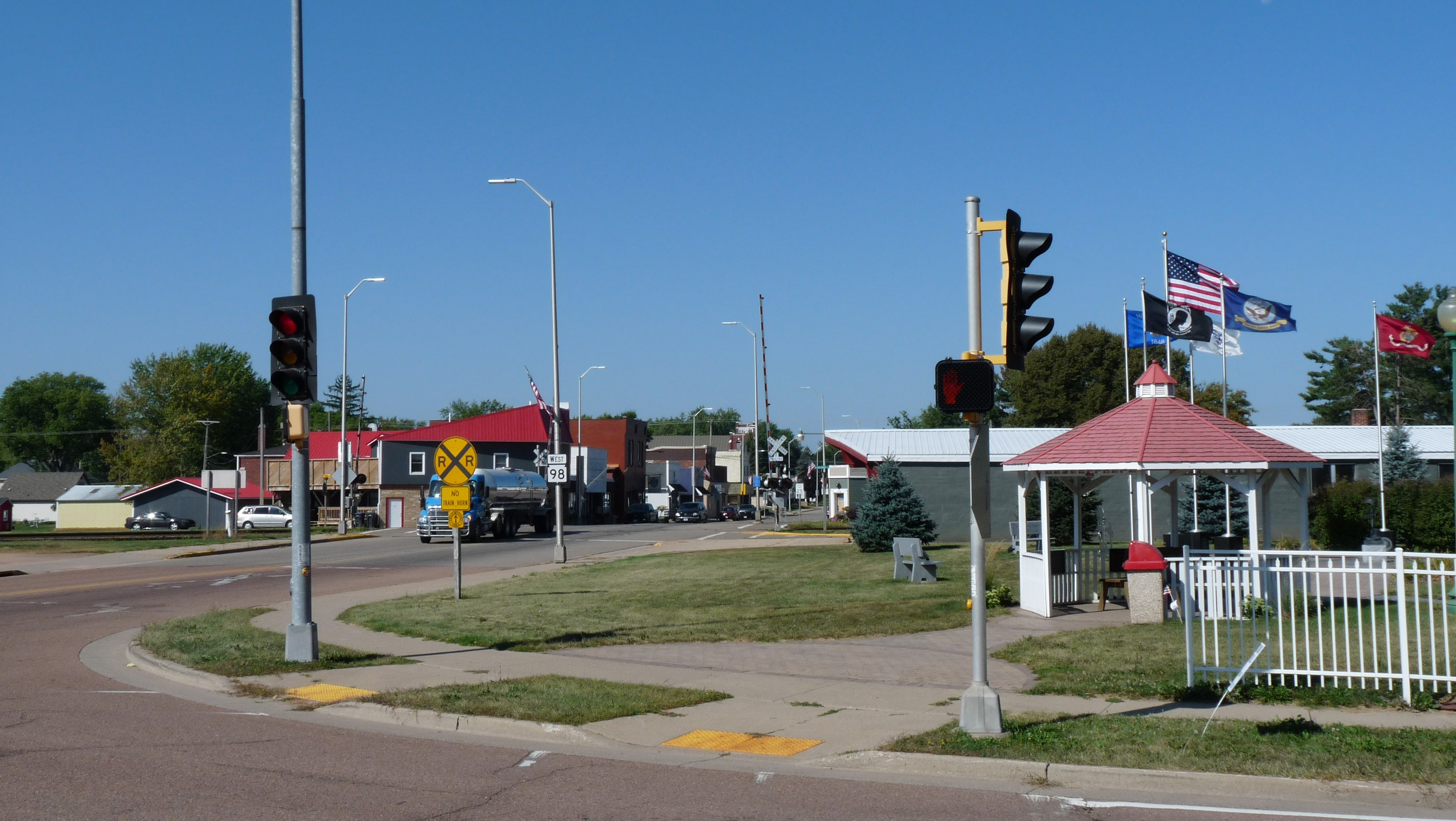
Spencer, Wisconsin

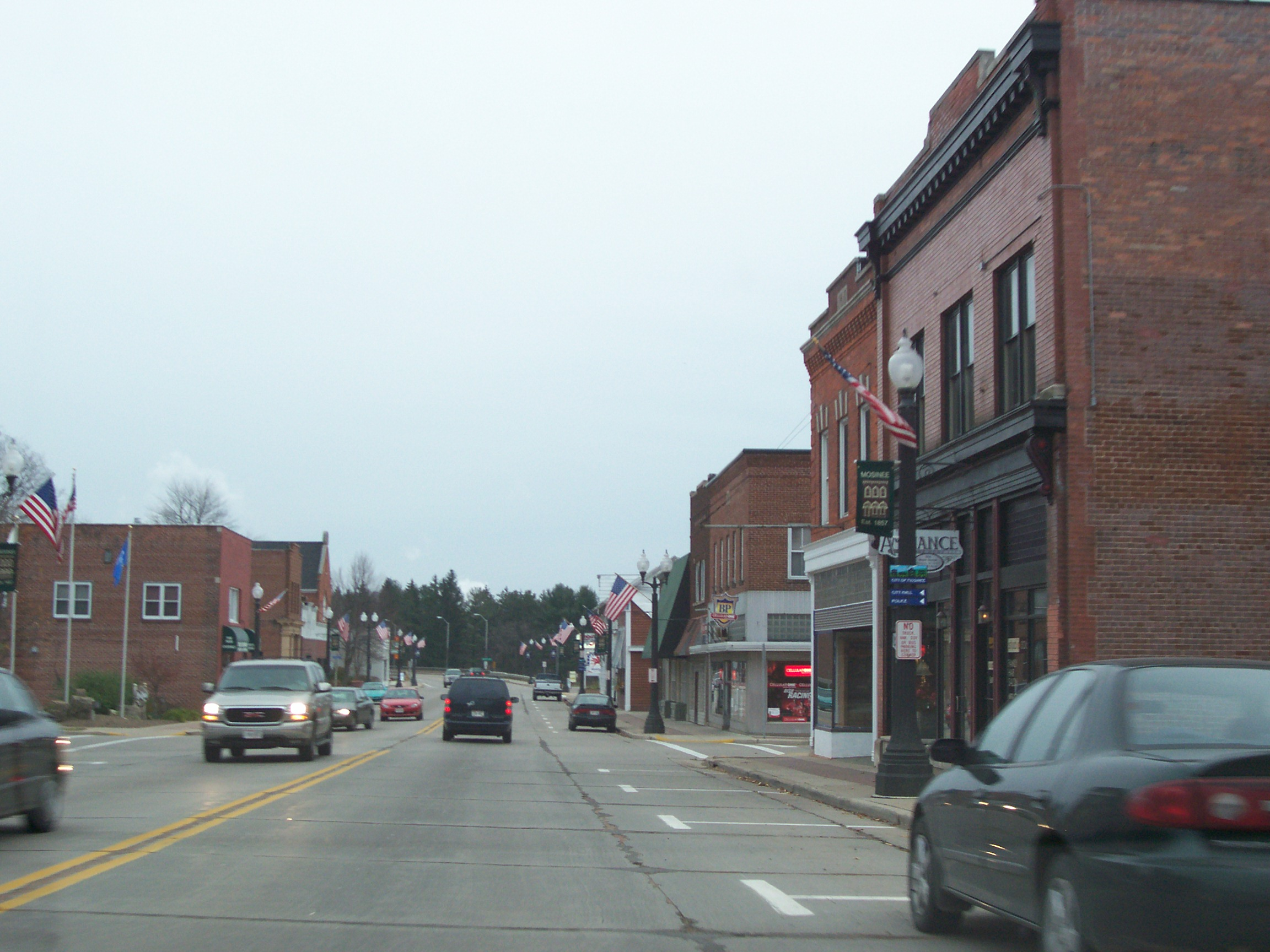
Downtown Mosinee

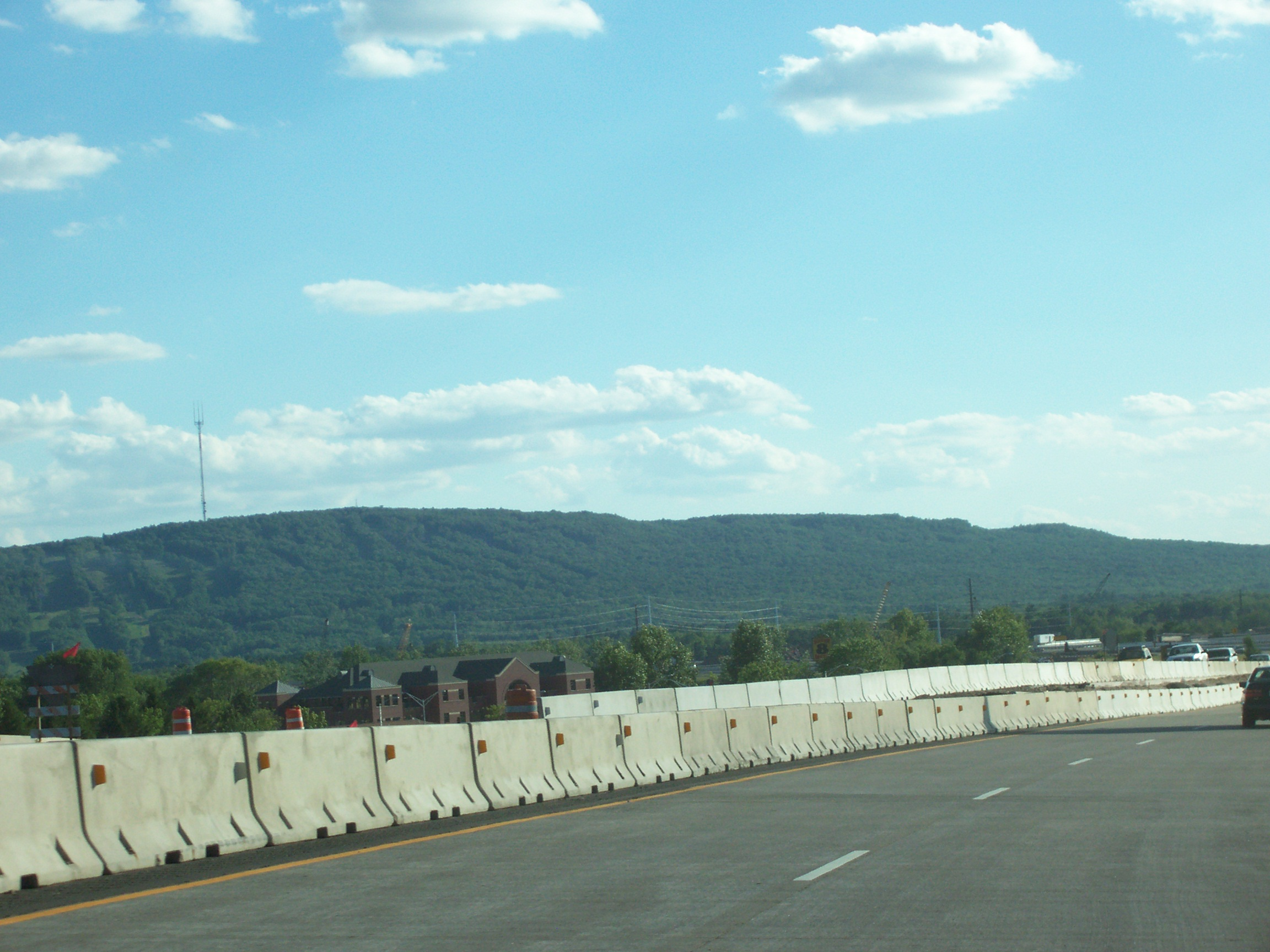
Rib Mountain State Park

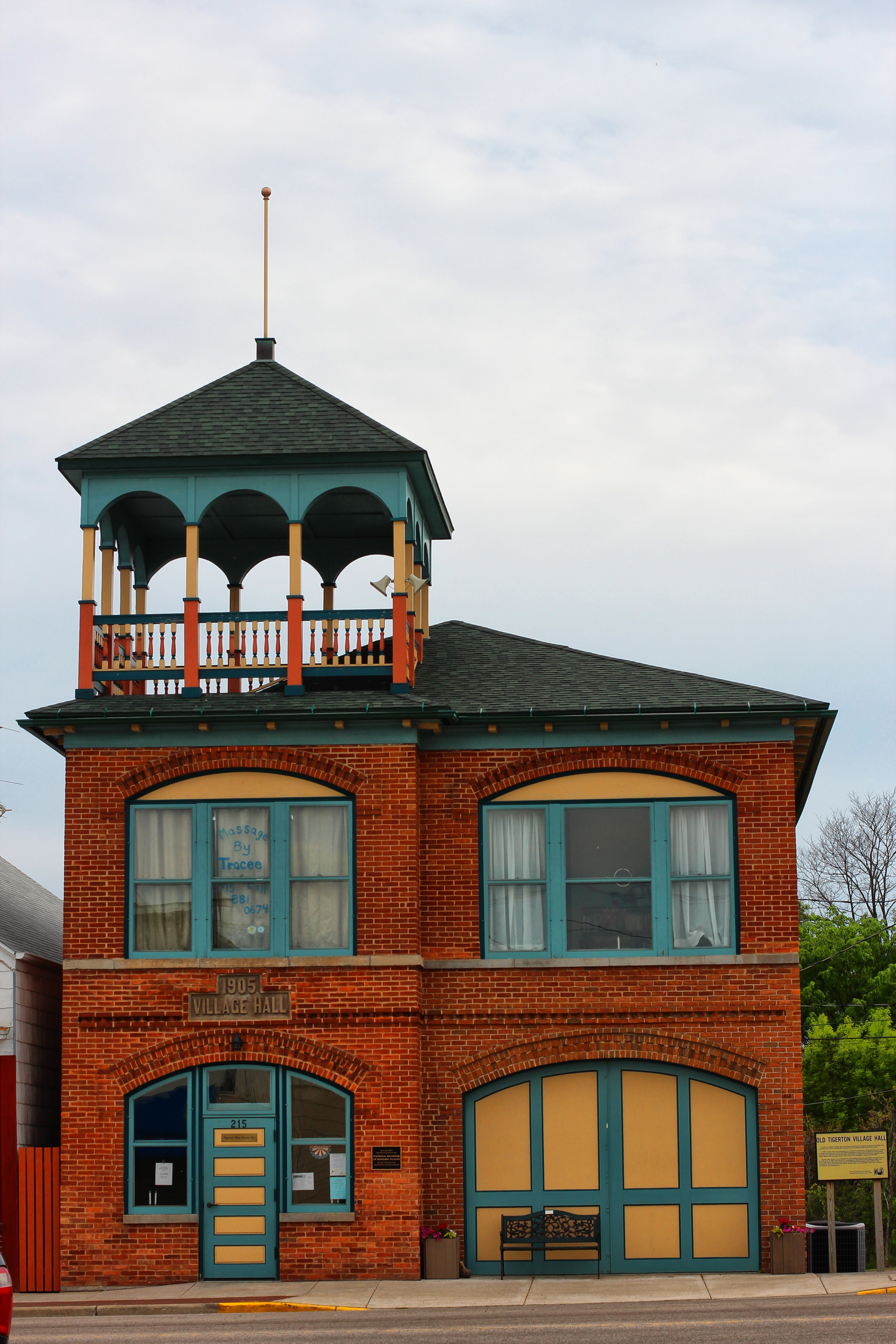
Tigerton village hall

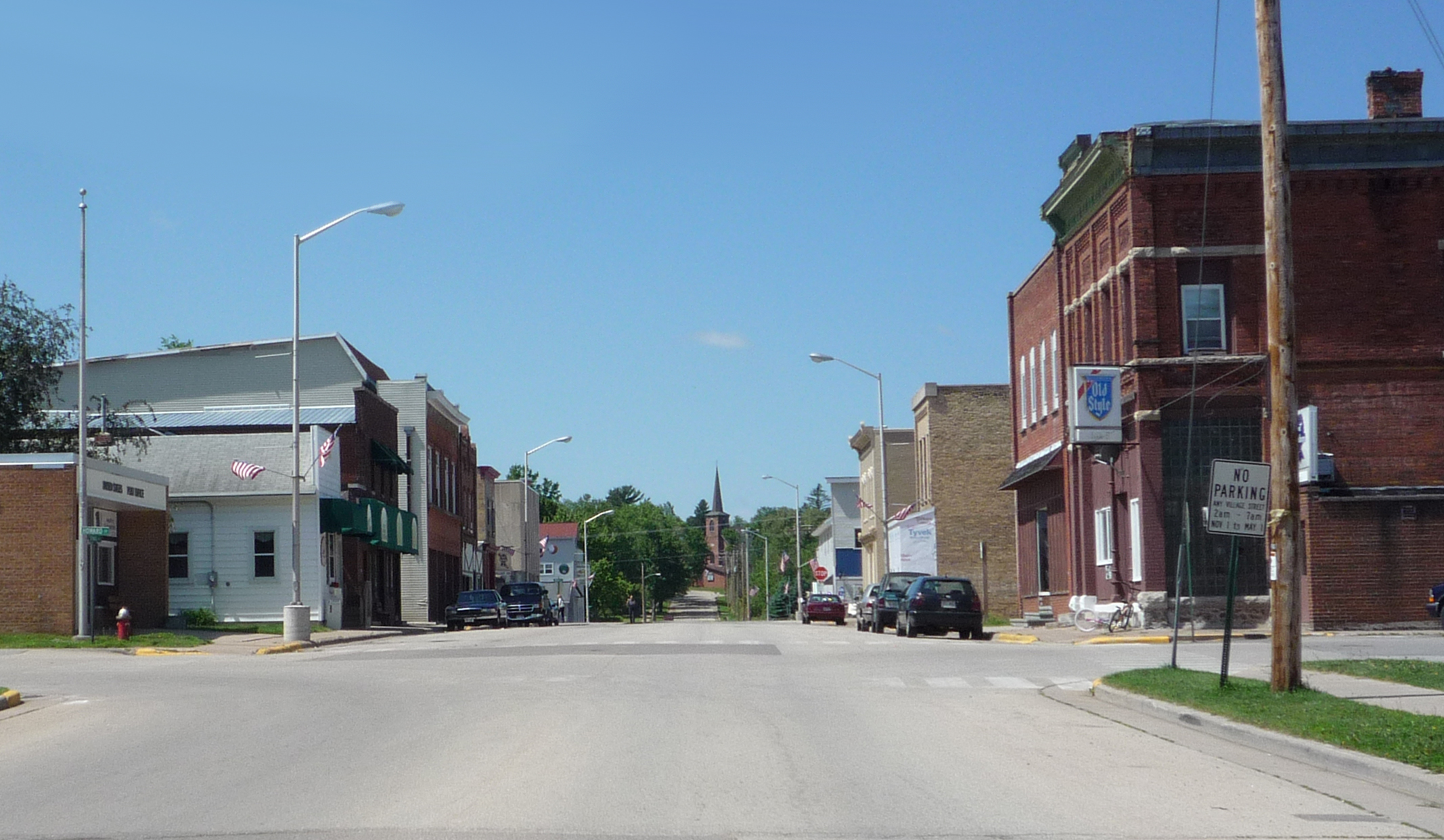
Wittenberg, Wisconsin

== Past senators ==
Previous senators include:

Note: the boundaries of districts have changed repeatedly over history. Previous politicians of a specific numbered district have represented a completely different geographic area, due to redistricting.

Senator	Party	Notes	Session	Years	District Definition
District created by 1856 Wisc. Act 109.				1856	Green Lake and Marquette counties
Martin L. Kimball	Rep.		10th	1857	Green Lake and Marquette counties
Martin L. Kimball	Rep.		11th	1858	Green Lake and Marquette counties
M. W. Seely	Rep.		12th	1859	Green Lake and Marquette counties
M. W. Seely	Rep.		13th	1860	Green Lake and Marquette counties
Charles S. Kelsey	Rep.		14th	1861	Green Lake and Marquette counties
Charles S. Kelsey	Rep.		15th	1862	Green Lake and Marquette counties
Charles S. Kelsey	Natl. Union		16th	1863	Green Lake and Marquette counties
Charles S. Kelsey	Natl. Union		17th	1864	Green Lake and Marquette counties
G. DeWitt Elwood	Natl. Union		18th	1865	Green Lake and Marquette counties
G. DeWitt Elwood	Natl. Union		19th	1866	Green Lake and Marquette counties
Henry G. Webb	Natl. Union		20th	1867	Green Lake, Marquette, and Waushara counties
Henry G. Webb	Natl. Union		21st	1868	Green Lake, Marquette, and Waushara counties
George D. Waring	Rep.		22nd	1869	Green Lake, Marquette, and Waushara counties
George D. Waring	Rep.		23rd	1870	Green Lake, Marquette, and Waushara counties
Waldo Flint	Rep.	Redistricted to 25th district.	24th	1871	Green Lake, Marquette, and Waushara counties
Eliphalet S. Miner	Rep.	Redistricted from 9th district.	25th	1872	Adams, Juneau, Portage, and Wood counties 1870 population: 33,519
Thomas B. Scott	Rep.		26th	1873	Adams, Juneau, Portage, and Wood counties 1870 population: 33,519
Thomas B. Scott	Rep.		27th	1874	Adams, Juneau, Portage, and Wood counties 1870 population: 33,519
Thomas B. Scott	Rep.		28th	1875	Adams, Juneau, Portage, and Wood counties 1870 population: 33,519
Thomas B. Scott	Rep.		29th	1876	Adams, Juneau, Portage, and Wood counties 1870 population: 33,519
Alexander A. Arnold	Rep.		30th	1877	Buffalo, Pepin, and Trempealeau counties 1875 population: 35,023
Alexander A. Arnold	Rep.		31st	1878	Buffalo, Pepin, and Trempealeau counties 1875 population: 35,023
Horace E. Houghton	Rep.		32nd	1879	Buffalo, Pepin, and Trempealeau counties 1875 population: 35,023
Horace E. Houghton	Rep.		33rd	1880	Buffalo, Pepin, and Trempealeau counties 1875 population: 35,023
Augustus F. Finkelnburg	Rep.		34th	1881	Buffalo, Pepin, and Trempealeau counties 1875 population: 35,023
Augustus F. Finkelnburg	Rep.		35th	1882	Buffalo and Trempealeau counties 1880 population: 32,717; 1885 population: 35,595
Noah D. Comstock	Ind. Rep.		36th	1883–1884	Buffalo and Trempealeau counties 1880 population: 32,717; 1885 population: 35,595
Noah D. Comstock	Rep.		37th	1885–1886	Buffalo and Trempealeau counties 1880 population: 32,717; 1885 population: 35,595
John W. DeGroff	Rep.		38th	1887–1888	Buffalo and Trempealeau counties 1880 population: 32,717; 1885 population: 35,595
John W. DeGroff	Rep.		39th	1889–1890	Buffalo, Pepin, and Trempealeau counties 1885 population: 42,567
Robert Lees	Dem.		40th	1891–1892	Buffalo, Pepin, and Trempealeau counties 1885 population: 42,567
Robert Lees	Dem.		41st	1893–1894	Barron, Buffalo, Dunn, and Pepin counties 1890 population: 61,009
James Huff Stout	Rep.		42nd	1895–1896	Barron, Buffalo, Dunn, and Pepin counties 1890 population: 61,009
James Huff Stout	Rep.		43rd	1897–1898	Chippewa and Dunn counties 1895 population: 53,733
James Huff Stout	Rep.		44th	1899–1900	Chippewa and Dunn counties 1895 population: 53,733
James Huff Stout	Rep.		45th	1901–1902	Chippewa and Dunn counties 1895 population: 53,733
James Huff Stout	Rep.		46th	1903–1904	Barron, Buffalo, Dunn, and Pepin counties 1900 population: 73,390
James Huff Stout	Rep.		47th	1905–1906	Barron, Buffalo, Dunn, and Pepin counties 1900 population: 73,390
James Huff Stout	Rep.		48th	1907–1908	Barron, Buffalo, Dunn, and Pepin counties 1900 population: 73,390
James Huff Stout	Rep.		49th	1909–1910	Barron, Buffalo, Dunn, and Pepin counties 1900 population: 73,390
George E. Scott	Rep.	Died Nov. 1915.	50th	1911–1912	Barron, Buffalo, Dunn, and Pepin counties 1900 population: 73,390
George E. Scott	Rep.	Died Nov. 1915.	51st	1913–1914	Barron, Dunn, and Polk counties 1910 population: 75,741
George E. Scott	Rep.	Died Nov. 1915.	52nd	1915–1916	Barron, Dunn, and Polk counties 1910 population: 75,741
--Vacant--			52nd	1915–1916	Barron, Dunn, and Polk counties 1910 population: 75,741
Algodt C. Anderson	Rep.	Won 1916 special election.	53rd	1917–1918	Barron, Dunn, and Polk counties 1910 population: 75,741
Algodt C. Anderson	Rep.	Won 1916 special election.	54th	1919–1920	Barron, Dunn, and Polk counties 1910 population: 75,741
Algodt C. Anderson	Rep.	Won 1916 special election.	55th	1921–1922	Barron, Dunn, and Polk counties 1910 population: 75,741
Carl B. Casperson	Rep.		56th	1923–1924	Barron, Dunn, and Polk counties 1910 population: 75,741
Carl B. Casperson	Rep.		57th	1925–1926	Barron, Dunn, and Polk counties 1910 population: 75,741
Carl B. Casperson	Rep.		58th	1927–1928	Barron, Dunn, and Polk counties 1910 population: 75,741
Carl B. Casperson	Rep.		59th	1929–1930	Barron, Dunn, and Polk counties 1910 population: 75,741
John A. Anderson	Rep.		60th	1931–1932	Barron, Dunn, and Polk counties 1910 population: 75,741
John A. Anderson	Rep.		61st	1933–1934	Barron, Dunn, and Polk counties 1910 population: 75,741
John A. Anderson	Prog.		62nd	1935–1936	Barron, Dunn, and Polk counties 1910 population: 75,741
John A. Anderson	Prog.		63rd	1937–1938	Barron, Dunn, and Polk counties 1910 population: 75,741
A. J. Connors	Prog.		64th	1939–1940	Barron, Dunn, and Polk counties 1910 population: 75,741
A. J. Connors	Prog.		65th	1941–1942	Barron, Dunn, and Polk counties 1910 population: 75,741
Charles D. Madsen	Prog.	Resigned Jan. 1949 after appointed County Judge.	66th	1943–1944	Barron, Dunn, and Polk counties 1910 population: 75,741
Charles D. Madsen	Prog.	Resigned Jan. 1949 after appointed County Judge.	67th	1945–1946	Barron, Dunn, and Polk counties 1910 population: 75,741
Charles D. Madsen	Rep.	Resigned Jan. 1949 after appointed County Judge.	68th	1947–1948	Barron, Dunn, and Polk counties 1910 population: 75,741
—Vacant--			69th	1949–1950	Barron, Dunn, and Polk counties 1910 population: 75,741
John E. Olson	Dem.	Won 1949 special election.	69th	1949–1950	Barron, Dunn, and Polk counties 1910 population: 75,741
William E. Owen	Rep.		70th	1951–1952	Barron, Dunn, and Polk counties 1910 population: 75,741
William E. Owen	Rep.		71st	1953–1954	Barron, Dunn, and Polk counties 1910 population: 75,741
Hugh M. Jones	Rep.		72nd	1955–1956	Marathon and Shawano counties
Hugh M. Jones	Rep.		73rd	1957–1958	Marathon and Shawano counties
Robert W. Dean	Dem.		74th	1959–1960	Marathon and Shawano counties
Robert W. Dean	Dem.		75th	1961–1962	Marathon and Shawano counties
Charles F. Smith Jr.	Rep.		76th	1963–1964	Marathon and Shawano counties
Charles F. Smith Jr.	Rep.		77th	1965–1966	Marathon, Menominee, and Shawano counties
Walter Chilsen	Rep.		78th	1967–1968	Marathon, Menominee, and Shawano counties
Walter Chilsen	Rep.		79th	1969–1970	Marathon, Menominee, and Shawano counties
Walter Chilsen	Rep.		80th	1971–1972	Marathon, Menominee, and Shawano counties
Walter Chilsen	Rep.		81st	1973–1974	Menominee County and Most of Marathon County; Most of Shawano County; Part of Langlade County; Part of Oconto County
Walter Chilsen	Rep.		82nd	1975–1976	Menominee County and Most of Marathon County; Most of Shawano County; Part of Langlade County; Part of Oconto County
Walter Chilsen	Rep.		83rd	1977–1978	Menominee County and Most of Marathon County; Most of Shawano County; Part of Langlade County; Part of Oconto County
Walter Chilsen	Rep.		84th	1979–1980	Menominee County and Most of Marathon County; Most of Shawano County; Part of Langlade County; Part of Oconto County
Walter Chilsen	Rep.		85th	1981–1982	Menominee County and Most of Marathon County; Most of Shawano County; Part of Langlade County; Part of Oconto County
Walter Chilsen	Rep.		86th	1983–1984	Price and Rusk counties and Most of Marathon County; Most of Taylor County; Part of Barron County
Walter Chilsen	Rep.		87th	1985–1986	Price County and Most of Marathon County; Most of Rusk County; Most of Taylor County; Part of Barron County; Part of Chippewa County; Part of Shawano County; Part of Waupaca County
Walter Chilsen	Rep.		88th	1987–1988	Price County and Most of Marathon County; Most of Rusk County; Most of Taylor County; Part of Barron County; Part of Chippewa County; Part of Shawano County; Part of Waupaca County
Walter Chilsen	Rep.		89th	1989–1990	Price County and Most of Marathon County; Most of Rusk County; Most of Taylor County; Part of Barron County; Part of Chippewa County; Part of Shawano County; Part of Waupaca County
Russ Decker	Dem.		90th	1991–1992	Price County and Most of Marathon County; Most of Rusk County; Most of Taylor County; Part of Barron County; Part of Chippewa County; Part of Shawano County; Part of Waupaca County
Russ Decker	Dem.		91st	1993–1994	Price, Rusk, and Taylor counties and Most of Marathon County
Russ Decker	Dem.		92nd	1995–1996	Price, Rusk, and Taylor counties and Most of Marathon County
Russ Decker	Dem.		93rd	1997–1998	Price, Rusk, and Taylor counties and Most of Marathon County
Russ Decker	Dem.		94th	1999–2000	Price, Rusk, and Taylor counties and Most of Marathon County
Russ Decker	Dem.		95th	2001–2002	Price, Rusk, and Taylor counties and Most of Marathon County
Russ Decker	Dem.		96th	2003–2004	Price and Rusk counties and Most of Marathon County; Most of Taylor County; Part of Portage County; Part of Sawyer County; Part of Shawano County
Russ Decker	Dem.		97th	2005–2006	Price and Rusk counties and Most of Marathon County; Most of Taylor County; Part of Portage County; Part of Sawyer County; Part of Shawano County
Russ Decker	Dem.		98th	2007–2008	Price and Rusk counties and Most of Marathon County; Most of Taylor County; Part of Portage County; Part of Sawyer County; Part of Shawano County
Russ Decker	Dem.		99th	2009–2010	Price and Rusk counties and Most of Marathon County; Most of Taylor County; Part of Portage County; Part of Sawyer County; Part of Shawano County
Pam Galloway	Rep.	Resigned March 2012.	100th	2011–2012	Price and Rusk counties and Most of Marathon County; Most of Taylor County; Part of Portage County; Part of Sawyer County; Part of Shawano County
—Vacant--			100th	2011–2012	Price and Rusk counties and Most of Marathon County; Most of Taylor County; Part of Portage County; Part of Sawyer County; Part of Shawano County
Jerry Petrowski	Rep.	Won 2012 special election.	100th	2011–2012	Price and Rusk counties and Most of Marathon County; Most of Taylor County; Part of Portage County; Part of Sawyer County; Part of Shawano County
Jerry Petrowski	Rep.	Won 2012 special election.	101st	2013–2014	Rusk and Taylor counties and Most of Marathon County; Most of Sawyer County; Part of Clark County; Part of Wood County
Jerry Petrowski	Rep.	Won 2012 special election.	102nd	2015–2016	Rusk and Taylor counties and Most of Marathon County; Most of Sawyer County; Part of Clark County; Part of Wood County
Jerry Petrowski	Rep.	Won 2012 special election.	103rd	2017–2018	Rusk and Taylor counties and Most of Marathon County; Most of Sawyer County; Part of Clark County; Part of Wood County
Jerry Petrowski	Rep.	Won 2012 special election.	104th	2019–2020	Rusk and Taylor counties and Most of Marathon County; Most of Sawyer County; Part of Clark County; Part of Wood County
Jerry Petrowski	Rep.	Won 2012 special election.	105th	2021–2022	Rusk and Taylor counties and Most of Marathon County; Most of Sawyer County; Part of Clark County; Part of Wood County
Cory Tomczyk	Rep.	Elected 2022.	106th	2023–2024	Rusk and Taylor counties and most of Marathon County, most of Sawyer County, part of Wood County
Cory Tomczyk	Rep.	Elected 2022.	107th	2025–2026	
