= John Olson (Wisconsin politician) =

20th century American politician

John E. Olson

Member of the Wisconsin Senate from the 29th district
- In office April 19, 1949 – January 1, 1951
- Preceded by: Charles D. Madsen
- Succeeded by: William E. Owen

Chairman of the Board of Supervisors of Barron County, Wisconsin
- In office April 15, 1947 – April 19, 1949
- Preceded by: George Mireau
- Succeeded by: Neil McDonald

Personal details
- Born: Johan Edward Olsen; June 15, 1892 Sioux Creek, Barron County, Wisconsin, U.S.
- Died: June 20, 1982 (aged 90) Chetek, Wisconsin, U.S.
- Resting place: Lake View Cemetery, Chetek, Wisconsin
- Party: Democratic
- Spouse: Olga Lydia Moe (m. 1915–1982)
- Children: 3
- Occupation: Farmer

John Edward Olson (born Johan Edward Olsen; June 15, 1892 – June 20, 1982) was an American farmer and Democratic politician from Barron County, Wisconsin. He served in the Wisconsin Senate during the 1949 session, after winning a special election in the 29th Senate district. He played an important role in bringing electricity to the rural communities of northwest Wisconsin, working with the Rural Electrification Administration.

His name was incorrectly listed as "John F. Olson" in the 1950 Wisconsin Blue Book, and that error has propagated to later editions.

== Biography ==
John E. Olson was born Johan Edward Olsen on his father's farm on June 15, 1892, in what is now the town of Sioux Creek, Barron County, Wisconsin. His mother died when he was eight, so he was largely raised by his father and older sisters. He attended public schools and then took the agriculture short course at River Falls State Normal School. He returned to Sioux Creek, where he took over his father's farm.

He quickly became involved in local affairs and served as a director of the Barron County Farm Loan association from 1920 to 1942. When the town of Sioux Creek was first organized, in 1929, Olson was elected one of the first members of the town board of supervisors. Two years later, he was elected chairman of the town board and held that position until 1953. While town chairman, he was ex oficio a member of the Barron County board of supervisors, and, in 1947, he was elected chairman of the county board.

While serving in local office, he was also active in the state implementation of the Rural Electrification Administration and his farm was the first in Barron County to sign up for electrification. He became one of the organizers of the Barron County Electric Cooperative and the Wisconsin Electric Cooperative. Before running for state senate, he was president of the Barron County Electric Cooperative and Treasurer of the Wisconsin Electric Cooperative.

During his second year as county board chairman, their district's state senator, Charles D. Madsen, resigned his seat to accept a judicial appointment. Since it was just the start of the 1949 legislative session, a special election was called for April. Democrats in the district quickly rallied around Olson as their candidate, and he was nominated without opposition in the special primary in March. He went on to win the special election with 56% of the vote, and served for the 20 months remaining in that term. He ran for a full term in the 1950 general election, but was defeated by Republican William E. Owen.

After leaving office, Olson resumed his interest in rural electrification. Following the 1950 merger of the Wisconsin Electric Cooperative and the Dairyland Cooperative, he became president of the new merged organization, the Dairyland Power Cooperative. He served in that role until retiring in 1974, at age 82.

Olson died at his home in Chetek on January 20, 1982, just a few days after his 90th birthday.

== Personal life and family ==
John E. Olson was the 11th of 13 children born to Norwegian American immigrants Hans Christian "H.C." and Pauline (née Jensen) Olsen.

He married Olga Lydia Moe on February 22, 1915, in Chetek. They had one son and two daughters, though only one daughter survived him. At the time of his death in 1982, he had seven grandchildren and seven great-grandchildren.

Wisconsin Senate}
Preceded by Charles D. Madsen	Member of the Wisconsin Senate from the 29th district April 5, 1949 – January 1, 1951	Succeeded by William E. Owen
