= Robert Lees (politician) =

19th century American politician

County Judge of Buffalo County, Wisconsin
- In office January 2, 1882 – September 21, 1908
- Preceded by: Conrad Moser Jr.
- Succeeded by: Martin L. Fugina

Member of the Wisconsin Senate from the 29th district
- In office January 5, 1891 – January 7, 1895
- Preceded by: John W. DeGroff
- Succeeded by: James Huff Stout

Member of the Wisconsin State Assembly from the Buffalo district
- In office January 6, 1873 – January 5, 1874
- Preceded by: George Cowie
- Succeeded by: Augustus F. Finkelnburg

Personal details
- Born: July 3, 1842 Coatbridge, Scotland, UK
- Died: September 21, 1908 (aged 66) La Crosse, Wisconsin, U.S.
- Cause of death: Stroke
- Resting place: Alma Cemetery, Alma, Wisconsin
- Party: Democratic
- Spouse: Mary Baertsch (m. 1865–1908)
- Children: Edward Lees^{(b. 1865; died 1928)}; May Mary Lees^{(b. 1868; died 1930)}; Isabel (Fetter)^{(b. 1871; died 1944)}; Andrew Lees^{(b. 1872; died 1943)}; Alice Lees^{(b. 1875; died 1913)}; Cora (Gesell)^{(b. 1883; died 1976)}
- Parent: Edward Lees (father)

Military service
- Allegiance: United States
- Branch/service: United States Volunteers; Union Army
- Years of service: 1861–1864
- Rank: 1st Sergeant, USV
- Unit: 6th Reg. Wis. Vol. Infantry
- Battles/wars: American Civil War: Northern Virginia campaign; First Battle of Rappahannock Station; Second Battle of Bull Run; Maryland campaign; Battle of South Mountain; Battle of Antietam; Fredericksburg campaign; Battle of Fredericksburg; Mud March; Chancellorsville campaign; Battle of Chancellorsville; Gettysburg campaign; Battle of Gettysburg (WIA/POW)

Robert Lees (July 3, 1842 – September 21, 1908) was a Scottish American immigrant, lawyer, judge, and Democratic politician. He served four years in the Wisconsin State Senate and one year in the State Assembly, and served as county judge of Buffalo County, Wisconsin, for the last 27 years of his life. During the American Civil War, he served in the famous Iron Brigade of the Army of the Potomac and was badly wounded at the Battle of Gettysburg.

== Biography ==
Lees was born on July 3, 1842, in Coatbridge, Scotland, near Glasgow, in July 1842. As a child, he emigrated with his parents to the United States in 1848, settling first at Waukesha County, Wisconsin, then moving to Cross township in Buffalo County in 1855. At the time, Buffalo County was a pioneer community with limited educational opportunities, but studied law under his father, Edward Lees.

== Civil War service ==
At the outbreak of the American Civil War in 1861, he joined up as a private with a company of volunteers for the Union Army. His company was enrolled as Company H, in the 6th Wisconsin Infantry Regiment. The 6th Wisconsin Infantry was sent to the eastern theater of the war and organized into a brigade which soon became known as the Iron Brigade of the Army of the Potomac. Lees served with the regiment through its participation in the major battles of the eastern theater, including Second Bull Run, South Mountain, Antietam, Fredericksburg, Chancellorsville, and Gettysburg, and was promoted to first sergeant in the company. At Gettysburg, he was severely wounded and taken prisoner by the enemy. He was subsequently paroled and sent to a Union Army hospital, where he remained until mustered out of federal service in July 1864.

== Political career ==
After being discharged, Lees returned to Buffalo County and established a home in Gilmantown. His wounds left him incapable of farm work, so he devoted the next several years to teaching at rural schools and was subsequently elected superintendent of schools for Buffalo County.

Lees became active with the Democratic Party of Wisconsin. In 1872, he won election to the Wisconsin State Assembly, representing Buffalo County's Assembly district. He continued studying law and was admitted to the bar shortly after his Assembly term. In 1881, he was elected county judge of Buffalo County, and was subsequently re-elected in 1885, 1889, 1893, 1897, 1901, and 1905. While serving as judge, he was elected to the Wisconsin State Senate in 1890 in Wisconsin's 29th State Senate district, then-comprising Buffalo, Barron, Dunn, and Pepin counties. He was not a candidate for re-election to the Senate in 1894. He served as county judge for the rest of his life.

Lees suffered a Stroke in September 1908, and died a few days later at his home in Alma, Wisconsin.

== Personal life and family ==
Robert Lees was the son of Edward Lees. Edward Lees was also a self-taught lawyer and served four terms in the Wisconsin State Assembly. On March 4, 1865, Robert Lees married Mary Baertsch, the daughter of another family of Buffalo County pioneers. They had six children together.

Their eldest son, Edward, became a lawyer in Winona, Minnesota, and served as court commissioner of the Minnesota Supreme Court for 10 years. Another son, Andrew, became a prominent attorney in La Crosse, Wisconsin.

Robert Lees was described as a friend of Edward S. Bragg, who had been colonel of the 6th Wisconsin Infantry and later served as a U.S. congressman and a leader of the Democratic Party of Wisconsin. In Bragg's final bid for election to the United States Senate in 1893, Lees was the sole vote for Bragg in the official tabulation.

== Electoral history ==
=== Wisconsin Assembly (1872) ===
Wisconsin Assembly, Buffalo District Election, 1872
Party	Candidate	Votes	%	±%
General Election, November 5, 1872
Democratic	Robert Lees	930	54.26%	
Republican	Robert Henry	784	45.74%	
Plurality		146	8.52%	
Total votes		1,714	100.0%	+10.72%
Democratic hold				

=== Wisconsin Senate (1890) ===
Wisconsin Senate, 29th District Election, 1890
Party	Candidate	Votes	%	±%
General Election, November 4, 1890
Democratic	Robert Lees	3,414	55.27%	+20.75%
Republican	J. L. Lindeman	2,763	44.73%	−14.64%
Plurality		651	10.54%	-14.31%
Total votes		6,177	100.0%	+9.50%
Democratic gain from Republican				

Wisconsin State Assembly
Preceded by George Cowie	Member of the Wisconsin State Assembly from the Buffalo district January 6, 1873 – January 5, 1874	Succeeded by Augustus F. Finkelnburg
Wisconsin Senate
Preceded by John W. DeGroff	Member of the Wisconsin Senate from the 29th district January 5, 1891 – January 7, 1895	Succeeded by James Huff Stout
Legal offices
Preceded by Conrad Moser Jr.	County Judge of Buffalo County, Wisconsin; January 2, 1882 – September 21, 1908	Succeeded by Martin L. Fugina
