= Augustus F. Finkelnburg =

19th century American politician

Augustus Finkelnburg

Member of the Wisconsin Senate from the 29th district
- In office January 3, 1881 – January 1, 1883
- Preceded by: Horace E. Houghton
- Succeeded by: Noah D. Comstock

Member of the Wisconsin State Assembly from the Buffalo district
- In office January 5, 1874 – January 4, 1875
- Preceded by: Robert Lees
- Succeeded by: Edward Lees

District Attorney of Buffalo County, Wisconsin
- In office January 3, 1876 – January 7, 1878
- Preceded by: Edward Lees
- Succeeded by: John W. McKay
- In office January 3, 1870 – January 1, 1872
- Preceded by: John W. McKay
- Succeeded by: Edward Lees

County Judge of Buffalo County, Wisconsin
- In office January 1, 1866 – January 3, 1870
- Preceded by: Ferdinand Fetter
- Succeeded by: Ferdinand Fetter

Personal details
- Born: May 6, 1830 Rhine Province, Prussia
- Died: January 1, 1889 (aged 58) San Antonio, Texas, U.S.
- Resting place: Fountain City Cemetery, Fountain City, Wisconsin
- Party: Republican
- Spouse: Maria Amalia Busch (m. 1855; died 1872)
- Children: Wilhelmina (Allen)^{(b. 1859; died 1936)}; Marie Francesca (Allen)^{(b. 1865; died 1946)}

Augustus Friedrich Finkelnburg (May 6, 1830 – January 1, 1889) was a German American immigrant, lawyer, Republican politician, and pioneer of Buffalo County, Wisconsin. He served two years in the Wisconsin State Senate and one year in the State Assembly, representing Buffalo County, and served as county judge and district attorney.

== Biography ==
Born in Rhenish Prussia, Finkelnburg emigrated to the United States and settled in Missouri. He then moved to California. In 1855, Finkelnburg settled in Fountain City, Buffalo County, Wisconsin and practiced law. Finkelnburg served as county clerk, Wisconsin circuit court clerk for Buffalo County, and district attorney. He also served as county judge for Buffalo County. In 1874, Finkelnburg served in the Wisconsin State Assembly as a Republican. In 1882 and 1883, Finkelnburg served in the Wisconsin State Senate. He died in San Antonio, Texas, where he had gone to recover from ill health.

== Electoral history ==
=== Wisconsin Assembly (1874) ===
Wisconsin Assembly, Buffalo District Election, 1873
| Party | Candidate | Votes | % | ±% |
|---|---|---|---|---|
General Election, November 4, 1873
| Republican | Augustus Finkelnburg | 927 | 53.15% | +7.41% |
| Liberal Republican | Harvey Brown | 817 | 46.85% | |
| Plurality | | 110 | 6.31% | |
| Total votes | | 1,744 | 100.0% | +1.75% |
| Republican gain from Democratic | | | | |

=== Wisconsin Senate (1880) ===
Wisconsin Senate, 29th District Election, 1880
| Party | Candidate | Votes | % | ±% |
|---|---|---|---|---|
General Election, November 2, 1880
| Republican | Augustus Finkelnburg | 5,247 | 81.97% | +14.25% |
| Democratic | Edward Lees | 1,154 | 18.03% | |
| Plurality | | 4,093 | 63.94% | +28.50% |
| Total votes | | 6,401 | 100.0% | +14.59% |
| Republican hold | | | | |

Wisconsin State Assembly
| Preceded by Robert Lees | Member of the Wisconsin State Assembly from the Buffalo district January 5, 1874 – January 4, 1875 | Succeeded by Edward Lees |
Wisconsin Senate
| Preceded by Horace E. Houghton | Member of the Wisconsin Senate from the 29th district January 3, 1881 – January 1, 1883 | Succeeded by Noah D. Comstock |
Legal offices
| Preceded by Ferdinand Fetter | County Judge of Buffalo County, Wisconsin; January 1, 1866 – January 3, 1870 | Succeeded by Ferdinand Fetter |
| Preceded by John W. McKay | District Attorney of Buffalo County, Wisconsin; January 3, 1870 – January 1, 1872 | Succeeded by Edward Lees |
| Preceded by Edward Lees | District Attorney of Buffalo County, Wisconsin; January 3, 1876 – January 7, 1878 | Succeeded by John W. McKay |
