= Axel Johnson (politician) =

American politician (1870-1924)

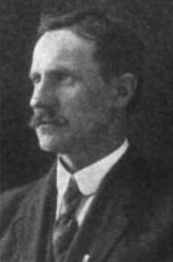

Member of the Wisconsin State Assembly
- In office January 6, 1919 – January 3, 1921
- Preceded by: Carl B. Casperson
- Succeeded by: George A. Nelson
- Constituency: Polk County district
- In office January 6, 1913 – January 1, 1917
- Preceded by: District re-established
- Succeeded by: Carl B. Casperson
- Constituency: Polk County district
- In office January 4, 1909 – January 6, 1913
- Preceded by: Jens P. Peterson
- Succeeded by: District abolished
- Constituency: Burnett–Polk district

Personal details
- Born: May 22, 1870 Denmark
- Died: September 25, 1924 (aged 54)
- Resting place: Mount Hope Cemetery, Turtle Lake, Wisconsin
- Party: Republican
- Spouse: Carrie Lizzie Pederson (m. 1894–1924)
- Children: 6
- Occupation: Dairy farmer, rancher

Axel Johnson (May 22, 1870 – September 25, 1924) was a Danish American immigrant, dairy farmer, and progressive Republican politician from Polk County, Wisconsin. He represented Polk County for five terms in the Wisconsin State Assembly (1909, 1911, 1913, 1915, 1919). He was a key figure in Wisconsin's ratification of the Eighteenth Amendment to the United States Constitution (Prohibition).

== Biography ==
Axel Johnson was born in Denmark on May 22, 1870, and was raised and educated there. He emigrated to the United States as a young man, he lived in Minneapolis, Minnesota, and took night classes studying agriculture. He went to work as a farm hand on a dairy farm in Kandiyohi County, Minnesota. After that, he traveled the west, working in Colorado and Wyoming for two years, then spent three years in Traill County, North Dakota, working as a farm foreman.

He settled in Polk County, Wisconsin, in 1892, and purchased 40 acres of land in the town of Apple River. He subsequently purchased another 140 acres in the neighboring town of Beaver. He operated his land as a dairy farm and cattle ranch.

He became active in local affairs and was elected to several terms as town clerk, member of the school board, and justice of the peace. He helped organize the Apple River and Beaver Creamery and served as secretary and manager of that organization, and was also a stockholder and director of the Polk County Cooperative Association.

He was elected to the Wisconsin State Assembly in 1908, running on the Republican Party ticket, and was re-elected in 1910. In his first two terms, he represented the district that comprised both Burnett and Polk counties. Following the redistricting act of 1911, Polk County became its own Assembly district. Johnson was elected to represent that district again in 1912, 1914, and 1918.

In 1916, Johnson ran for Wisconsin Senate in the vacant 29th State Senate district, but lost in the primary to Algodt C. Anderson. There was also some discussion at the beginning of 1916 that the La Follette faction of the Republican party might want to run Johnson as a candidate in a primary challenge against congressman Irvine Lenroot, but that challenge was ultimately abandoned in favor of the Senate race.

During his final term in the Assembly in 1919–1920, he was chairman of the committee on State Affairs, and was one of the leaders of the prohibition movement. He led the effort in the Wisconsin Legislature to ratify the Eighteenth Amendment to the United States Constitution, and then worked on the passage of Wisconsin's legislation for the enforcement of prohibition.

During that session, he was also the author of the so-called "dog tax", which created a licensing requirement for owning a dog—each dog required a license, the owner would have to pay a fee for each license. The new fees created an uproar, beginning in Johnson's home county of Polk, with hundreds of dog owners declaring their refusal to pay.

Johnson did not stand for re-election in 1920.

== Personal life and family ==
Axel Johnson was a son of Christ and Johanna (née Peterson) Johnson.

He married Carrie "Lizzie" Peterson, a daughter of Danish immigrants, on December 5, 1894. They had six children.

== Electoral history ==
=== Wisconsin Assembly, Polk–Burnett district (1908, 1910) ===
Year	Election	Date	Elected				Defeated				Total	Plurality
1908	General	Nov. 3	Axel Johnson	Republican	4,155	81.81%	F. A. Partlow	Dem.	924	18.19%	5,079	3,231
1910	General	Nov. 8	Axel Johnson (inc)	Republican	2,414	83.53%	C. W. Staples	Soc. Dem.	476	16.47%	2,890	1,938

=== Wisconsin Assembly, Polk district (1912, 1914) ===
Year	Election	Date	Elected				Defeated				Total	Plurality
1912	General	Nov. 5	Axel Johnson	Republican	2,187	86.75%	C. W. Staples	Soc. Dem.	332	13.17%	2,521	1,855
1912	General	Nov. 5	Axel Johnson	Republican	2,187	86.75%	Ole S. Lee (write-in)	Dem.	2	0.08%	2,521	1,855
1914	General	Nov. 3	Axel Johnson (inc)	Republican	1,012	69.46%	Ole S. Lee	Dem.	445	30.54%	1,457	567

=== Wisconsin Senate (1916) ===
Year	Election	Date	Elected				Defeated				Total	Plurality
1916	Primary	Sep. 5	Algodt C. Anderson	Republican	2,851	46.68%	Axel Johnson	Rep.	1,706	27.93%	6,108	1,145
1916	Primary	Sep. 5	Algodt C. Anderson	Republican	2,851	46.68%	Frank Pierce	Rep.	1,551	25.39%	6,108	1,145

=== Wisconsin Assembly, Polk district (1918) ===
Year	Election	Date	Elected				Defeated				Total	Plurality
1918	General	Nov. 3	Axel Johnson	Republican	1,617	68.00%	O. W. Lund	Dem.	761	32.00%	2,378	856

Wisconsin State Assembly
Preceded by Jens P. Peterson	Member of the Wisconsin State Assembly from the Burnett–Polk district January 4, 1909 – January 6, 1913	District abolished
District established	Member of the Wisconsin State Assembly from the Polk County district January 6, 1913 – January 1, 1917	Succeeded by Carl B. Casperson
Preceded by Carl B. Casperson	Member of the Wisconsin State Assembly from the Polk County district January 6, 1919 – January 3, 1921	Succeeded by George A. Nelson
