= Algodt C. Anderson =

20th century American politician

Al C. Anderson
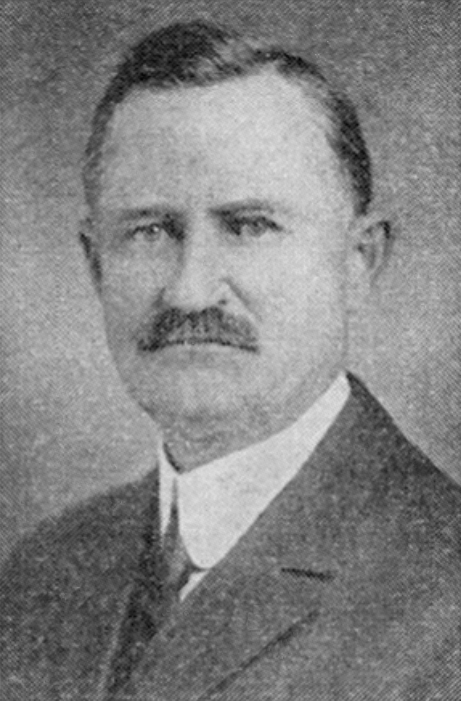

Chairman of the Wisconsin Highway Commission
- In office March 1925 – February 1, 1927
- Preceded by: W. O. Hotchkiss
- Succeeded by: Joseph T. Nemachek

Member of the Wisconsin Senate from the 29th district
- In office January 1, 1917 – January 1, 1923
- Preceded by: George E. Scott
- Succeeded by: Carl B. Casperson

Personal details
- Born: September 24, 1860 Skövde, Sweden–Norway
- Died: May 31, 1949 (aged 88) Menomonie, Wisconsin, US
- Resting place: Evergreen Cemetery, Menomonie, Wisconsin
- Party: Republican
- Spouses: Josephine Wisher (m. 1884; died 1892); Mary F. Scanlan (m. 1895; died 1939)

Algodt "Al" C. Anderson (September 24, 1860 – May 31, 1949) was a Swedish American immigrant, businessman, and progressive Republican politician. He was a member of the Wisconsin Senate, representing the 29th Senate district from 1917 through 1923.

== Early life and career ==
Algodt C. Anderson was born in Skövde, Sweden, in September 1860. As a child, he emigrated to the United States with his parents in 1872, settling on a farm just outside Menomonie Junction—the settlement later incorporated as the city of Menomonie, Wisconsin. Through the remainder of his childhood, he worked on his father's farm and attended school in the winters.

In 1877, he learned the barber trade and started a barber shop the next year in Clear Lake, Wisconsin. In 1879, he moved to River Falls, Wisconsin, where he operated a successful barber shop until 1892. In 1893, he returned to Menomonie and went into business with his brother in a cigar manufacturing business. The business flourished into a significant wholesaler and dealer of cigars and other tobacco products, known as Anderson Bros, Inc. He continued the business for most of the rest of his life.

== Public offices ==
One of his most lasting contributions to the state occurred before he entered state office. In 1914, he convinced then-governor Francis E. McGovern to build the Stout Home Economics building on the campus of the Stout Institute in Menomonie, which was a significant factor in establishing the state relationship with the school which later became the University of Wisconsin–Stout.

In 1916, Anderson decided to enter the special election to replace deceased state senator George E. Scott. He faced a competitive Republican primary against state representative Axel Johnson and bank president Frank Pierce. Anderson ultimately prevailed in the primary with 47% of the vote and went on to easily win the general election in the heavily Republican district. He was re-elected to a full four-year term in the Senate in 1918, not facing any opposition in the primary or general election. In the 1919 session of the legislature, he served on the influential Joint Finance Committee.

During his final term in the Senate, he was appointed to the Wisconsin Highway Commission for a six-year term, and was then elected chairman of the Highway Commission, serving from 1925 until the end of his term in 1927.

In 1929, he moved into another government post when he was chosen as a trustee of the Dunn County Asylum, where he remained until 1936. He was then elected a trustee of the Mabel Tainter Memorial Society and, the following year, trustee of the Evergreen Cemetery Association. He also served several years on the board of directors of the Kraft State Bank.

== Personal life and family ==
Anderson was active in Freemasonry and was master of the Menomonie lodge for several years.

Algodt Anderson married twice. His first wife was Josephine Wisher of Menomonie, who he married in 1884. She died in 1892. He subsequently married Mary Francis "Minnie" Scanlan on June 20, 1895. Their marriage lasted 44 years before her death on October 18, 1939.

Algodt Anderson died on May 31, 1949, at his home in Menomonie, Wisconsin. He was interred at Menomonie's Evergreen Cemetery.

== Electoral history ==
=== Wisconsin Senate (1916, 1918) ===
Wisconsin Senate, 29th District Special Election, 1916
| Party | Candidate | Votes | % | ±% |
|---|---|---|---|---|
Republican Primary, September 5, 1916
| Republican | Algodt C. Anderson | 2,851 | 46.68% | |
| Republican | Axel Johnson | 1,706 | 27.93% | |
| Republican | Frank Pierce | 1,551 | 25.39% | |
| Plurality | | 1,145 | 18.75% | |
| Total votes | | 6,108 | 100.0% | |
General Election, November 7, 1916
| Republican | Algodt C. Anderson | 8,339 | 72.89% | |
| Democratic | John D. Hogan | 3,102 | 27.11% | |
| Plurality | | 5,237 | 45.77% | |
| Total votes | | 11,441 | 100.0% | |
| Republican hold | | | | |

Wisconsin Senate
| Preceded by George E. Scott | Member of the Wisconsin Senate from the 29th district January 1, 1917 – January 1, 1923 | Succeeded by Carl B. Casperson |
Government offices
| Preceded by W. O. Hotchkiss | Chairman of the Wisconsin Highway Commission; March 1925 – February 1, 1927 | Succeeded by Joseph T. Nemachek |
