= John W. DeGroff =

19th century American politician

John DeGroff

Member of the Wisconsin Senate from the 29th district
- In office January 3, 1887 – January 5, 1891
- Preceded by: Noah D. Comstock
- Succeeded by: Robert Lees

Member of the Wisconsin State Assembly from the Buffalo district
- In office January 6, 1879 – January 5, 1880
- Preceded by: John J. Senn
- Succeeded by: Franklin Gilman

Personal details
- Born: October 12, 1843 Mentz, New York, U.S.
- Died: December 26, 1895 (aged 52) Buffalo County, Wisconsin, U.S.
- Party: Republican
- Spouse(s): Frances H. Newman , and had three known children, a daughter: Winifred (1869–1942 (Cole)); and two sons:
- Children: Winifred (Cole)^{(b. 1869; died 1942)}; Frederick O. DeGroff^{(b. 1878; died 1938)}; Robert Roy DeGroff^{(b. 1878)}
- Relatives: Allen H. DeGroff (brother)

Military service
- Allegiance: United States
- Branch/service: United States Volunteers; Union Army
- Years of service: 1862–1865
- Rank: Private, USV
- Unit: 25th Reg. Wis. Vol. Infantry
- Battles/wars: American Civil War: Atlanta campaign; Savannah Campaign

John W. DeGroff (October 12, 1843 – December 26, 1895) was an American politician, newspaper publisher, and businessman. He was a member of the Wisconsin State Senate and Assembly, representing Buffalo and Trempealeau counties. As a young man, he also served in the Union Army through most of the American Civil War.

== Biography ==
DeGroff was born on October 12, 1843, in Mentz, New York. He moved to Juneau, Wisconsin in 1848 and to Alma, Wisconsin in 1858. During the American Civil War, DeGroff served in the 25th Wisconsin Volunteer Infantry Regiment of the Union Army. He took part in the Battle of Atlanta and Sherman's March to the Sea.

DeGroff edited the Buffalo County Journal and the Marshfield Times. Additionally, he was a deputy state factory inspector at the time of his death.

DeGroff was elected to the Wisconsin State Assembly in 1879. In 1886, he was elected to the Senate representing the 29th District. He remained a member until 1891. Additionally, he was president of Alma and Clerk of Buffalo County, Wisconsin, as well as chairman of the Buffalo County Board. DeGroff was a Republican.

He died in Buffalo County, Wisconsin, of heart disease on December 26, 1895.

Wisconsin State Assembly
Preceded by John J. Senn	Member of the Wisconsin State Assembly from the Buffalo district January 6, 1879 – January 5, 1880	Succeeded by Franklin Gilman
Wisconsin Senate
Preceded by Noah D. Comstock	Member of the Wisconsin Senate from the 29th district January 3, 1887 – January 5, 1891	Succeeded by Robert Lees
