= Noah D. Comstock =

19th century American politician

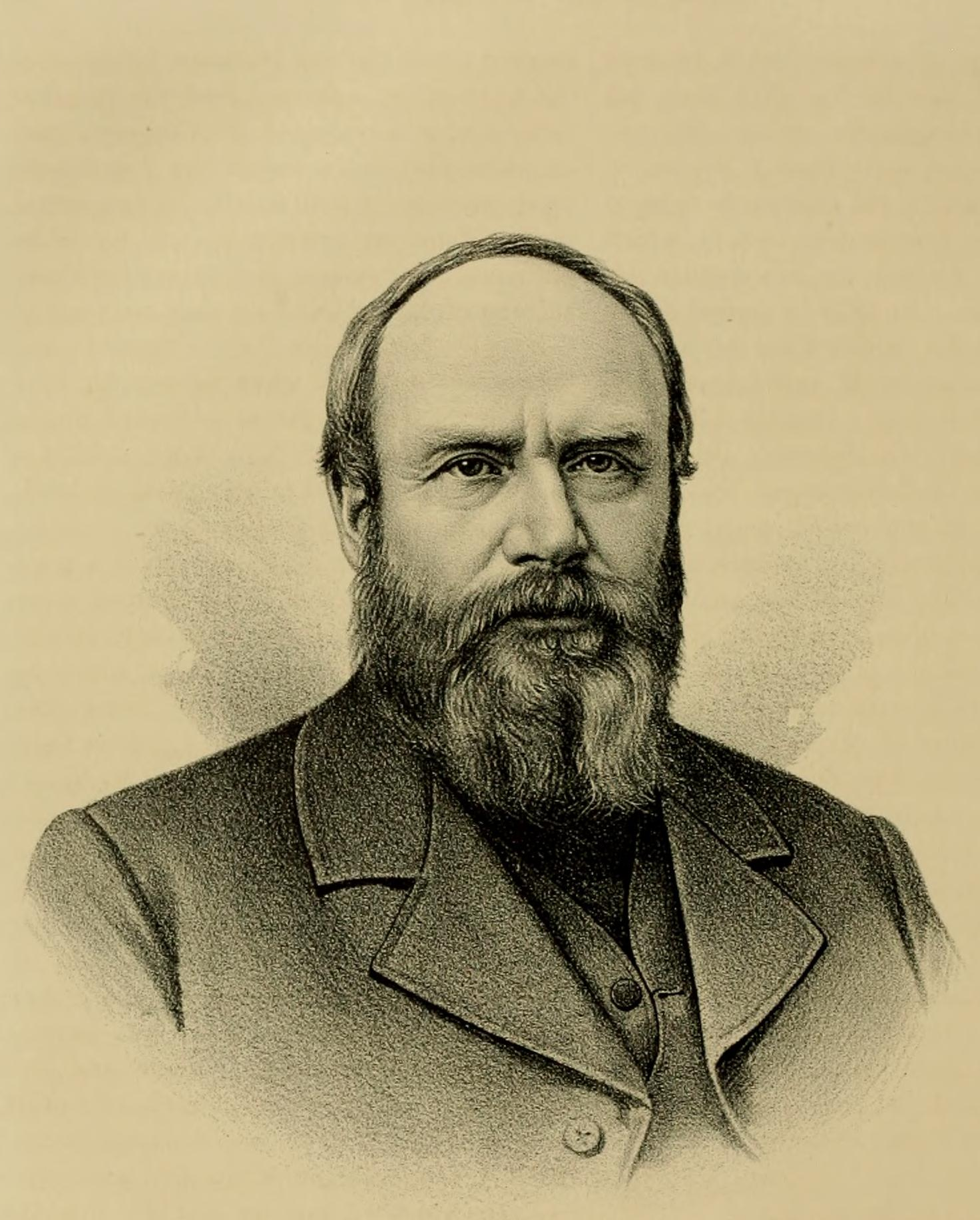
- Portrait from Biographical History of La Crosse, Trempealeau and Buffalo Counties, Wisconsin (1894)

Member of the Wisconsin Senate from the 29th district
- In office January 1, 1883 – January 3, 1887
- Preceded by: Augustus F. Finkelnburg
- Succeeded by: John W. DeGroff

Member of the Wisconsin State Assembly from the Trempealeau district
- In office January 5, 1874 – January 1, 1877
- Preceded by: Seth W. Button
- Succeeded by: James L. Linderman
- In office January 1, 1872 – January 6, 1873
- Preceded by: Alexander A. Arnold
- Succeeded by: Seth W. Button

Personal details
- Born: November 22, 1832 Lowville, New York, U.S.
- Died: June 6, 1890 (aged 57) Arcadia, Wisconsin, U.S.
- Resting place: Arcadia Cemetery, Arcadia, Wisconsin
- Party: Republican
- Spouse: Ellen Comstock (m. 1868–1890)
- Children: Henry Samuel Comstock^{(b. 1858; died 1936)}; Adam Comstock^{(b. 1871; died 1898)}; Nathan Comstock^{(b. 1873; died 1951)}

Noah Durham Comstock (November 22, 1832 – June 6, 1890) was an American farmer and Republican politician. He served four years in the Wisconsin State Senate and four years in the State Assembly, representing Trempealeau County.

== Biography ==
Born in Lowville, New York, Comstock moved to Calhoun County, Michigan, in 1850. In 1851, he moved to Indiana and then in 1853, Comstock moved to California. In 1855, Comstock settled in the town of Arcadia, Trempealeau County, Wisconsin and was a farmer. Comstock served as the Arcadia Town Treasurer in 1858 and Trempealeau County Treasurer in 1860, 1862, and 1864. He also served on the Trempealeau County Board of Supervisors in 1868. In 1872, 1874, 1876, and 1876, Comstock served in the Wisconsin State Assembly and was a Republican. From 1883 to 1887, Comstock also served in the Wisconsin State Senate. Comstock died of heart disease in Arcadia, Wisconsin.

Wisconsin State Assembly
Preceded by Alexander A. Arnold	Member of the Wisconsin State Assembly from the Trempealeau district January 1, 1872 – January 6, 1873	Succeeded by Seth W. Button
Preceded by Seth W. Button	Member of the Wisconsin State Assembly from the Trempealeau district January 5, 1874 – January 1, 1877	Succeeded by James L. Linderman
Wisconsin Senate
Preceded by Augustus F. Finkelnburg	Member of the Wisconsin Senate from the 29th district January 1, 1883 – January 3, 1887	Succeeded by John W. DeGroff
