= James Huff Stout =

American politician (1848–1910)

James H. Stout
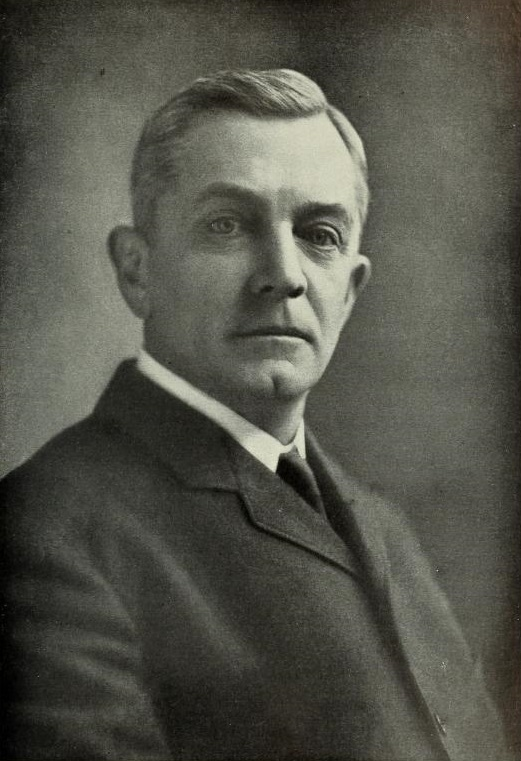

Member of the Wisconsin Senate from the 29th district
- In office January 7, 1895 – January 2, 1911
- Preceded by: Robert Lees
- Succeeded by: George E. Scott

Personal details
- Born: September 25, 1848 Dubuque, Iowa, U.S.
- Died: December 8, 1910 (aged 62) Menomonie, Wisconsin, U.S.
- Resting place: Evergreen Cemetery, Menomonie
- Party: Republican
- Spouse: Angelina W. Wilson (m. 1899–1910)
- Children: James Huff Stout Jr.^{(b. 1890; died 1911)}; Evaline Deming Stout^{(b. 1895; died 1903)}; William Wilson Stout^{(b. 1898; died 1958)}
- Education: Old University of Chicago
- Occupation: Businessman

James Huff Stout (September 25, 1848 – December 8, 1910) was an American businessman and Republican politician from Dunn County, Wisconsin. He served sixteen years in the Wisconsin Senate, representing Wisconsin's 29th Senate district from 1895 to 1911.

His father, Henry Lane Stout, was one of the major owners of the successful Knapp, Stout & Co. lumber company. As one of Henry Stout's heirs, James used his wealth for extensive philanthropy and was the founder of the self-named "Stout Institute" school in Menomonie, Wisconsin, which later became the University of Wisconsin–Stout.

== Biography ==
Born in Dubuque, Iowa, Stout became involved with his father's lumber business. After working in the District of Columbia and Read's Landing, Minnesota, Stout settled in Menomonie, Wisconsin. From 1895 to 1910, he served in the Wisconsin Senate. While in the Wisconsin Senate he worked in opening libraries and improving highways. He also started a manual school in Menomonie, Wisconsin that became the University of Wisconsin–Stout.

Wisconsin Senate
Preceded by Robert Lees	Member of the Wisconsin Senate from the 29th district January 7, 1895 – January 2, 1911	Succeeded by George E. Scott
