= Charles W. Gilman =

American lawyer and politician (1862–1938)

Member of the Wisconsin State Assembly
- In office 1901–1905

Personal details
- Born: October 20, 1862 Gilmanton, Wisconsin, U.S.
- Died: August 26, 1938 (aged 75) Seattle, Washington, U.S.
- Party: Republican
- Education: University of Wisconsin
- Occupation: Politician, lawyer

Charles W. Gilman (October 20, 1862 – August 26, 1938) was an American lawyer and politician.

Born in the town of Gilmanton, Buffalo County, Wisconsin, Gilman went to Madison High School. On June 24, 1885, Gilman graduated from University of Wisconsin. Then on June 23, 1886, he graduated from University of Wisconsin Law School and was admitted to the Wisconsin bar. Gilman served as district attorney of Buffalo County, Wisconsin for six years. Gilman also served as mayor of Mondovi, Wisconsin and was a Republican. From 1901 to 1905, Gilman served in the Wisconsin State Assembly. Gilman died in Seattle, Washington from a heart ailment.
