= Elmer A. Kenyon =

American politician

Elmer A. Kenyon (September 14, 1870 – March 11, 1922) was an American businessman, farmer, and politician.

Born in the town of Gilmanton, Buffalo County, Wisconsin, Kenyon was a farmer and also in general merchandising. He was also involved with the bank and telephone businesses and the creamery. Kenton served as clerk of the school district and on the county board of education. He was also clerk of the town of Gilmanton and served as postmaster of Gilmanton. In 1921, Kenyon served in the Wisconsin State Assembly and was a Republican. He died while still in office following an appendicitis operation.
