= William E. Owen =

American politician

Member of the Wisconsin Senate from the 29th district
- In office January 1, 1951 – January 3, 1955
- Preceded by: John E. Olson
- Succeeded by: Hugh M. Jones

Member of the Wisconsin State Assembly from the Dunn County district
- In office January 2, 1961 – January 4, 1965
- Preceded by: Einer P. Lund
- Succeeded by: Francis L. Peterson
- In office January 7, 1957 – January 5, 1959
- Preceded by: G. H. Bakke
- Succeeded by: Einer P. Lund

Personal details
- Born: November 28, 1888 New Haven, Dunn County, Wisconsin, U.S.
- Died: July 16, 1976 (aged 87) Menomonie, Wisconsin, U.S.
- Resting place: Saint Pauls Cemetery, Menomonie, Wisconsin
- Party: Republican
- Spouse: Freda G. Owen (m. 1911; died 1974)

William Esthon Owen (November 28, 1888 – July 16, 1976) was an American farmer and Republican politician from Dunn County, Wisconsin. He served six years in the Wisconsin State Assembly and four years in the Wisconsin Senate.

== Biography ==
Owen was born on November 28, 1888, in New Haven, Dunn County, Wisconsin. Owen graduated from Connorsville, Wisconsin High School and went to the Dunn County Agriculture School. He was a farmer and was involved with the rural electric cooperative. Owen also served as president of the school board. Owen died on July 16, 1976, in Menomonie, Wisconsin.

== Career ==
Owen was a member of the Senate from 1951 to 1954 and of the Assembly from 1957 to 1958. In 1954, he ran for the United States House of Representatives from Wisconsin's 9th congressional district, losing to Lester Johnson. He was a Republican.
