= Harold R. W. Benjamin =

American educator and writer

Harold Raymond Wayne Benjamin (1893–1969) was an American educator and writer; known for his publications The Saber-Tooth Curriculum (1939) and Higher Education in the American Republics (1965) (Guthrie 168).

== Biography ==
=== Early life and education ===
Harold Raymond Wayne Benjamin was born March 27, 1893, in Gilmanton, Wisconsin, to Harold and Harriet Benjamin. He moved to Oregon with his family in 1904, and graduated from Tualatin Academy in 1910. Benjamin earned degrees from both the Oregon Normal School and the University of Oregon. He later received a Ph.D. from the Stanford Graduate School of Education in 1927 (Ohles 112).

=== Career ===
Benjamin’s professional career was extremely long and illustrious. He began his teaching career at Salem Heights Elementary School in 1915. Benjamin then became the superintendent of schools in Umatilla, Oregon, until 1922. He moved on to become an assistant professor of education at the University of Oregon until 1925. Benjamin decided to take a job at Stanford University as a teaching fellow before deciding to enroll in their student teaching program in 1927. After completion of the program in 1931, he moved on to the University of Minnesota where he was a professor of education and the assistant dean of the college of education until 1936. Benjamin decided to take a job at the University of Colorado as the director of the college of education for two years. After two years in Colorado, he took a position as the dean of the college of education at the University of Maryland, College Park where he served for twelve years. In 1951, Benjamin became the chairman of social foundations of education at Peabody College in Tennessee where he ended his career in education in 1958 (Ohles 112).

In his career, Benjamin was also a noted figure in comparative international education. He traveled to many Latin countries comparing the way the U.S. and other countries ran their higher education systems, which led him to writing a well-known book Higher Education in the American Republic (Guthrie 169).

Harold R.W. Benjamin’s main purpose in his work was to preserve the democratic processes in American schooling and for an awakening of instructional consciousness toward individual differences. This belief led him to writing another well known book, The Saber-Tooth Curriculum. The Saber-Tooth Curriculum was written by Benjamin under the pseudonym J. Abner Peddiwell. Published in 1939, The Saber-Tooth Curriculum is a satirical commentary explaining how unexamined traditions of schooling can result in resisting needed changes (Guthrie 169). He believed education needs to be responsive to the emerging needs of the life experience and he felt education in his time was sticking to teachings of old rather than of present times.

=== Personal life ===
Benjamin married Dr. Georgia Kessi, a researcher and leading voice of global educational systems, in 1920. Together they had three children.
