= Cross, Wisconsin =

- Town
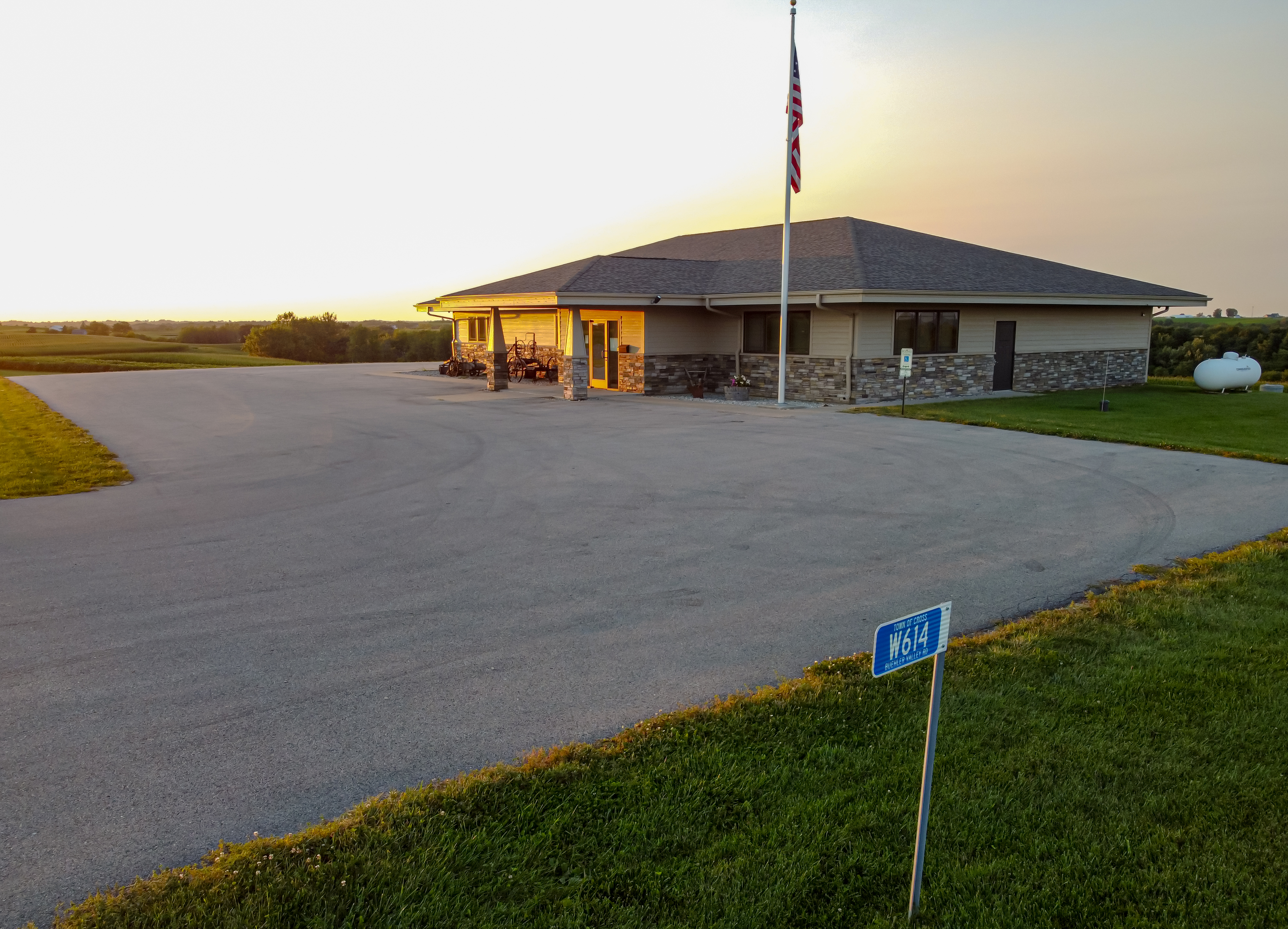
- Town hall

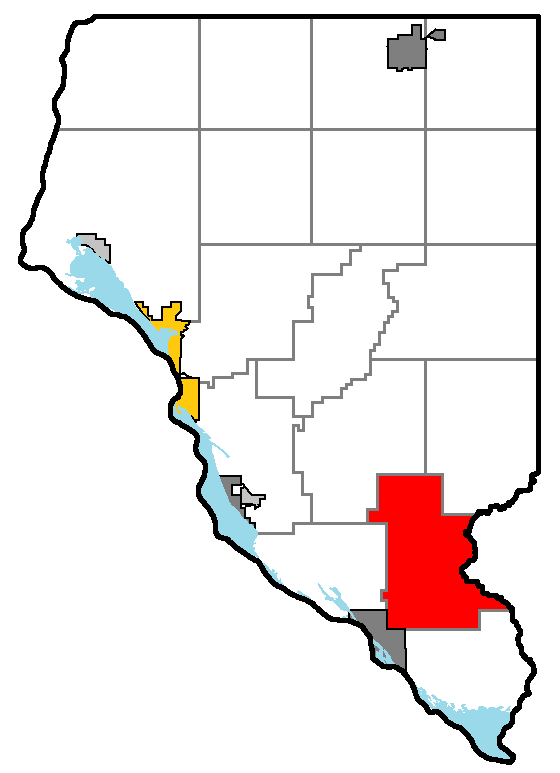
- Location of Cross, Buffalo County

- Location of Buffalo County, Wisconsin
- Coordinates: 44°12′11″N 91°37′59″W
- Country: United States
- State: Wisconsin
- County: Buffalo

Area
  - Total: 37.7 sq mi (97.7 km^{2})
  - Land: 37.5 sq mi (97.2 km^{2})
  - Water: 0.15 sq mi (0.4 km^{2})
- Elevation: 1,155 ft (352 m)

Population (2020)
  - Total: 368
  - Density: 9.81/sq mi (3.79/km^{2})
- Time zone: UTC-6 (Central (CST))
  - Summer (DST): UTC-5 (CDT)
- FIPS code: 55-17737
- GNIS feature ID: 1583028
- Website: townofcross.com

Cross is a town in Buffalo County in the U.S. state of Wisconsin. The population was 368 at the 2020 census. The ghost town of Bohri was located in the town.

Cross is located in southern Buffalo County and is bordered by Trempealeau County to the east. The city of Fountain City touches the town's southwestern corner.

According to the United States Census Bureau, the town has a total area of 37.7 square miles (97.7 km^{2}), of which 37.5 square miles (97.2 km^{2}) is land and 0.15 square miles (0.4 km^{2}), or 0.44%, is water.

== Demographics ==
As of the census of 2000, there were 366 people, 127 households, and 105 families residing in the town. The population density was 9.7 people per square mile (3.8/km^{2}). There were 141 housing units at an average density of 3.7 per square mile (1.4/km^{2}). The racial makeup of the town was 99.18% White, 0.27% Native American, and 0.55% from two or more races. Hispanic or Latino of any race were 1.37% of the population.

There were 127 households, out of which 41.7% had children under the age of 18 living with them, 74.0% were married couples living together, 3.1% had a female householder with no husband present, and 17.3% were non-families. 15.7% of all households were made up of individuals, and 4.7% had someone living alone who was 65 years of age or older. The average household size was 2.88 and the average family size was 3.12.

In the town, the population was spread out, with 30.6% under the age of 18, 6.6% from 18 to 24, 29.5% from 25 to 44, 24.3% from 45 to 64, and 9.0% who were 65 years of age or older. The median age was 34 years. For every 100 females, there were 101.1 males. For every 100 females age 18 and over, there were 106.5 males.

The median income for a household in the town was $50,500, and the median income for a family was $52,708. Males had a median income of $32,188 versus $21,667 for females. The per capita income for the town was $19,625. About 6.4% of families and 4.1% of the population were below the poverty line, including none of those under the age of eighteen or sixty-five or over.

== Notable people ==
- Edward Lees, Wisconsin State Representative
- Robert Lees, Wisconsin State Senator
