= Martin L. Kimball =

19th century American politician

District Attorney of Green Lake County, Wisconsin
- In office January 4, 1875 – January 3, 1881
- Preceded by: George D. Waring
- Succeeded by: Henry S. Comstock

Member of the Wisconsin Senate from the 29th district
- In office January 5, 1857 – January 3, 1859
- Preceded by: District established
- Succeeded by: M. W. Seely

District Attorney of Marquette County, Wisconsin
- In office January 1, 1854 – January 1, 1856

Personal details
- Born: September 24, 1826 Leyden, New York, U.S.
- Died: March 18, 1891 (aged 64) Oshkosh, Wisconsin, U.S.
- Resting place: Oakwood Cemetery, Berlin, Wisconsin
- Party: Republican; Free Soil (before 1854)
- Spouses: Mary Buttrick (m. 1852; died 1862); Frances Ann Richards (m. 1863–1891)
- Children: 8
- Relatives: Alonzo Kimball (brother)
- Education: Hamilton College
- Profession: Lawyer

Martin Luther Kimball (September 24, 1826 – March 18, 1891) was an American lawyer, Republican politician, and Wisconsin pioneer. He was a member of the Wisconsin Senate, and was the first representative of the 29th State Senate district, serving in the 1857 and 1858 sessions. His name is often abbreviated as M. L. Kimball.

== Biography ==
M. L. Kimball was born in September 1826, in Leyden, New York. He was raised on his father's farm and then sent to Williston Seminary in Easthampton, Massachusetts, to prepare for college. He attended Hamilton College, in Clinton, New York, graduating in 1849.

That same year, he moved to the new state of Wisconsin. He studied law for a year under James M. Keep in Beloit, Wisconsin, and finished his legal education in the law office of Finch and Synde in Milwaukee. He was admitted to the bar in Milwaukee in 1851.

He then moved north to the city of Berlin, Wisconsin, where he established a law practice. At the time, this was part of Marquette County, but this area would later be detached as Green Lake County. Just a few years after settling in Berlin, Kimball was elected district attorney of Marquette County, serving for two years.

Politically, Kimball was originally a member of the Free Soil Party, but joined the Republican Party when it was created in 1854.

In the fall of 1856, he was elected to the Wisconsin Senate from the 29th State Senate district—the 29th State Senate district had just been created in the 1856 redistricting act and comprised the counties of Marquette and Green Lake. He served a two-year term and did not run for re-election in 1858. He was the youngest member of the Senate at the time, being 30 years old when sworn in, but nevertheless was appointed to the judiciary committee.

After leaving the Senate, he served several years on the Green County board of supervisors and was chairman of the board of supervisors for more than a decade. He was a delegate to the 1864 National Union National Convention. Later, he was elected to three consecutive terms as district attorney of Green Lake County, serving from 1875 through 1881.

== Personal life and family ==
Martin L. Kimball was the eleventh of twelve children born to Reuel and Hannah (née Mather) Kimball. Reuel Kimball was a Presbyterian minister and had served as a paymaster for the United States Army during the War of 1812. One of Martin Kimball's older brothers, Alonzo Kimball, also came to Wisconsin and became a prominent citizen and mayor of Green Bay, Wisconsin.

Martin Kimball married Mary Buttrick of Clinton, New York, in 1852, but the marriage lasted only ten years and produced no children. Mary Buttrick died in 1862. Less than a year later, Kimball married Frances Ann Richards, a daughter of Reverend William Mason Richards, of Berlin, Wisconsin. This second marriage produced eight children and lasted until the end of Kimball's life.

In addition to his legal and political work, Kimball was a member of the Congregational church, and was active in the Temperance movement in Wisconsin.

Martin L. Kimball died suddenly on March 18, 1891, in Oshkosh, Wisconsin.

Wisconsin Senate
| District created | Member of the Wisconsin Senate from the 29th district January 5, 1857 – January 3, 1859 | Succeeded by M. W. Seely |
Legal offices
| Preceded by George D. Waring | District Attorney of Green Lake County, Wisconsin; January 4, 1875 – January 3, 1881 | Succeeded by Henry S. Comstock |
