= Bohri, Wisconsin =

- Ghost town
- Location within Wisconsin
- Coordinates: 44°08′42″N 91°36′10″W
- Country: United States
- State: Wisconsin
- County: Buffalo
- Town: Cross
- Elevation: 732 ft (223 m)
- GNIS feature ID: 1837496

Bohri is a ghost town in Buffalo County, Wisconsin, United States. Bohri was located in the town of Cross, 5.8 miles (9.3 km) east of Fountain City.
