= Allen H. DeGroff =

19th century American politician

Member of the Wisconsin State Assembly from the Buffalo–Pepin district
- In office January 7, 1895 – January 4, 1897
- Preceded by: Duncan McKenzie
- Succeeded by: Samuel F. Plummer

Personal details
- Born: September 12, 1848 Dodge County, Wisconsin, U.S.
- Died: July 21, 1932 (aged 83) Oakland, California, U.S.
- Resting place: Evergreen Cemetery, Oakland, California
- Party: Republican
- Spouses: Mary Evans (died 1880); Anna Walker
- Children: Arthur DeGroff
- Relatives: John W. DeGroff (brother)

Military service
- Allegiance: United States
- Branch/service: United States Volunteers; Union Army
- Years of service: 1864–1865
- Rank: Private, USV
- Unit: 25th Reg. Wis. Vol. Infantry; 12th Reg. Wis. Vol. Infantry
- Battles/wars: American Civil War: Atlanta campaign; Savannah Campaign

Allen H. DeGroff (September 12, 1848 – July 21, 1932) was an American merchant and politician. He was a member of the Wisconsin State Assembly, representing Buffalo and Pepin counties during the 1895 session.

== Biography ==
Allen H. DeGroff was born September 12, 1848, in Dodge County, Wisconsin. His family had settled there in 1844. When he was about nine years old, the family moved to a farm in the town of Nelson, in Buffalo County.

On January 23, 1864, he enlisted for service in the Union Army, joining Company G of the 25th Wisconsin Infantry Regiment, where his brother had been serving since 1862. At age 15, he was one of the youngest volunteers for the Union Army from the state of Wisconsin. He served with the regiment until it mustered out of service in June 1865, at which time he transferred to the 12th Wisconsin Infantry Regiment and served another month until that regiment disbanded in July.

After the war, he returned to his father's farm in Buffalo County and attended school for two more years. For several years after, he worked on his father's farm in the summers and taught school in the winters.

In 1880 he went into the merchandising business and became involved with the Republican Party of Wisconsin. He was appointed postmaster at Misha Mokwa, Wisconsin, in 1883, and served for most of the next decade in that role. He served as chairman of the town board for eight years, and was town clerk, and town treasurer. He was elected to two terms as chairman of the Buffalo County Board of Supervisors and served as chairman of the Buffalo County Republican Party from 1888 to 1890.

In 1894, he was elected to the Wisconsin State Assembly, representing Buffalo and Pepin counties. He served in the 1895 session and was not a candidate for re-election in 1896.

After his term in the Legislature, DeGroff moved to North Dakota, and subsequently relocated to California, where he died in 1932.

== Personal life and family ==
Allen H. DeGroff was one of eight children born to John Smith DeGroff and his wife his wife Eliza (née Barner). John Smith DeGroff was a Wisconsin pioneer and a successful farmer. Allen's elder brother, John W. DeGroff, also served in the 25th Wisconsin Infantry Regiment and represented Buffalo County in the Wisconsin State Assembly.

Allen H. DeGroff married twice. He had one son, Arthur, with his first wife, Mary Evans, before her death in 1880. He subsequently married Anna Walker, whose family moved to Buffalo County in the 1870s.

Aside from political matters, Allen DeGroff was active in the veterans organization the Grand Army of the Republic and the fraternal organization the Knights of Pythias.

Wisconsin State Assembly
Preceded by Duncan McKenzie	Member of the Wisconsin State Assembly from the Buffalo–Pepin district January 7, 1895 – January 4, 1897	Succeeded by Samuel F. Plummer
