= M. W. Seely =

19th century American politician

Member of the Wisconsin Senate from the 29th district
- In office January 3, 1859 – January 7, 1861
- Preceded by: Martin L. Kimball
- Succeeded by: Charles S. Kelsey

Personal details
- Born: August 22, 1813 Bainbridge, New York, U.S.
- Died: August 25, 1889 (aged 76) Canton, Dakota Territory, U.S.
- Cause of death: Stroke
- Resting place: Forest Hill Cemetery, Canton, South Dakota
- Party: Republican
- Spouses: Charlotte Byington (died before 1851); Susan Helen Akin (m. 1851–1889)
- Children: Harriet M. (Baldwin)^{(b. 1855)}; Charles Merritt Seely^{(b. 1857; died 1915)}

Merritt W. Seely (August 22, 1813 – August 25, 1889) was an American lawyer, Republican politician, and Wisconsin pioneer. He was a member of the Wisconsin Senate, representing Green Lake and Marquette counties during the 1859 and 1860 sessions. His name was often abbreviated M. W. Seely, and his last name was sometimes spelled Seeley.

== Biography ==
M. W. Seely was born in Bainbridge, New York. He was raised and educated in that area, and in 1839 served as village clerk of Bainbridge.

Sometime before 1843, he moved west to Peru, Indiana, where he was a prominent lawyer in the community. After a fire destroyed many of the court records in Miami County, Seely was appointed by an act of the Indiana General Assembly as commissioner to try to collect any remaining evidence and testimony to attempt to restore the records as much as possible, but he was mostly unsuccessful.

In the mid-1840s, he moved west to the Wisconsin Territory and settled in what is now the town of Brooklyn, Green Lake County, Wisconsin. At the time, this was part of Marquette County. His home was located between the villages of Green Lake and Ripon, but he was mostly associated with Ripon. He was one of the founding members of the St. Peter's Episcopal Church in Ripon, and was one of the first officers of the church.

In 1858, Seely was elected to the Wisconsin Senate, running on the Republican Party ticket. He represented the 29th State Senate district during the 1859 and 1860 legislative sessions. At the time, his district comprised Marquette and Green Lake counties.

After his term in the legislature, Seely served as a county commissioner for the Union Army draft in Fond du Lac County. He was assigned to examine the evidence of people who claimed exemption from military service. He also served three years as municipal judge of the city and town of Ripon, Wisconsin, holding office from July 1862 to May 1865. He subsequently moved to St. Louis, Missouri, where he resumed his legal career.

Later in life, he went to live with his son, Charles, in Canton, Dakota Territory, where he died of a stroke in August 1889.

== Personal life and family ==
Seely was the second of at least six children born to Henry "Harry" and Clarissa "Clara" (née Lyon) Seely, of Bainbridge, New York. His paternal grandfather, Eli Seely, served in the American Revolutionary War. The Seely family were descendants of Robert Seeley, an early Puritan settler at Massachusetts Bay Colony. Merritt Seely's younger brother, Josiah, also came to Wisconsin and settled in Waupun.

M. W. Seely married twice, his first wife was Charlotte Byington, of Cairo, New York. She died while they were living in Peru, Indiana. Seely subsequently married Susan Helen Akin, of Ontario County, New York, in 1851. With his second wife, he had at least two children. Their son Charles Merritt Seely was a successful businessman in Canton, South Dakota, served two terms as mayor, and was appointed financial clerk of the federally-administered Hiawatha Asylum.

Wisconsin Senate
Preceded by Martin L. Kimball	Member of the Wisconsin Senate from the 29th district January 3, 1859 – January 7, 1861	Succeeded by Charles S. Kelsey
