= Alice Houghton =

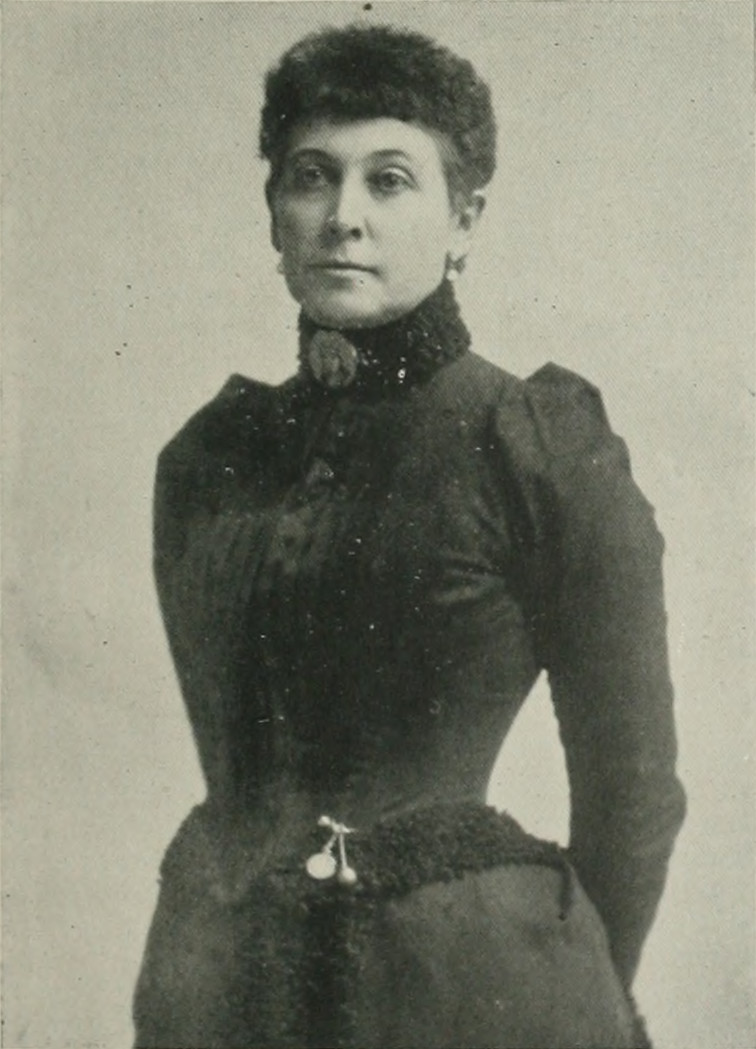
- "A Woman of the Century"
- Born: Alice A. Ide; August 18, 1849; Montreal, Canada
- Died: August 19, 1920 (aged 71); Chicago, Illinois, U.S.
- Other name: Alice Brownlee
- Occupation: broker
- Spouses: Horace Eaton Houghton (m. 1864; died 1897); Archibald Graham Brownlee (m. 1900; died 1912)

Alice Houghton (née, Ide; after first marriage, Houghton; after second marriage, Brownlee; August 18, 1849 – August 19, 1920) was a Canadian-born American broker and clubwoman. In her era, she had the distinction of being the only women in Spokane, Washington who was actively engaged as a real estate dealer.

== Early life and education ==
Alice A. Ide was born in Montreal, Canada, August 18, 1849. Her father was Frederick Ide, an architect. Alice was the fourth in a family of five daughters. In 1853, the family moved to Mondovi, Wisconsin, and then to Durand, Wisconsin.

In Durand, she received a liberal education.

== Career ==
In 1864, in Durand, she married Horace Eaton Houghton (1835–1897), an attorney of Mondovi, who would later serve in the Washington State Senate. They had two children, Harry and Idell.

In September 1884, after suffering financial losses, the Houghtons removed to Spokane Falls, Washington. With her husband's health shattered, in the spring of 1887, she commenced speculating in real estate in Spokane. The following year, she opened a real estate office. It was in the days when everywhere in the Western United States, real estate was "booming", and Houghton achieved a remarkable success, at one time owning property valued at considerably more than a US$100,000.

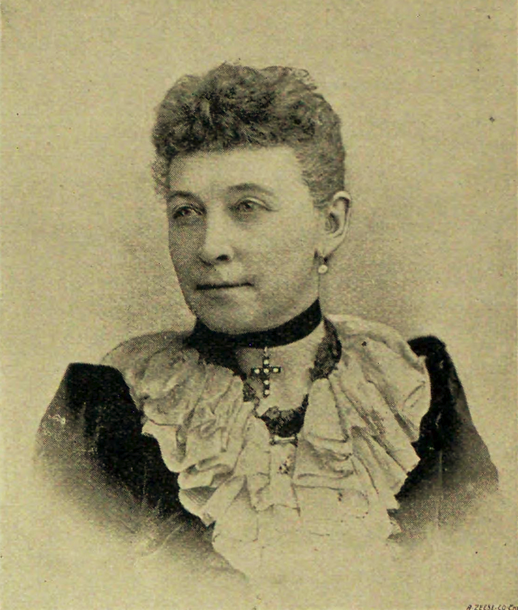
Alice Houghton (1893)

Her business talents led her into active business life, and she became the head of the successful real estate, insurance, and investment brokerage house, Mrs. Alice Houghton & Co., in 1888. Her management was practical and progressive, and her brokerage house was known throughout Washington. She was a prudent financier, her business methods were good, and her tact enabled her to compete with men in the arduous field of brokerage. Then came the panic of 1893, and Houghton's wealth was wiped out almost in a day.

For some time prior to the panic, she had been in Chicago, representing Washington as chair of its board of lady managers and superintendent of the woman's department of her State at the World's Columbian Exposition (1893). Here she had made many friends who had learned to appreciate her business talent, while she took an active and conspicuous part in preparing various novel displays for the exposition, her work as Lady Manager being characteristic of her usual progressive spirit.

She at once found a place as manager of the emigration bureau conducted by the Great Northern and Northern Pacific railroads, the first woman who held such a position in the U.S. or any other country. At the same time, she turned her attention to mining, in which she had previously had some success. After a year and a half, she fitted up an office in Chicago and derived a good income from her mining investments while she devoted herself to the sale of farm lands, mines, and other properties in Washington, Oregon, and Idaho.

After Mr. Houghton's death in 1897, she made two trips into the Klondike, where again she was financially fortunate. Having once more achieved financial independence, she chose Denver, Colorado for her new home, not only for its many advantages as a residence city, but regarding it as the mining center of the West. She had interests at several points of Colorado, California, and in the Klondike, while she was instrumental in enlisting large sums of money for mining investment.

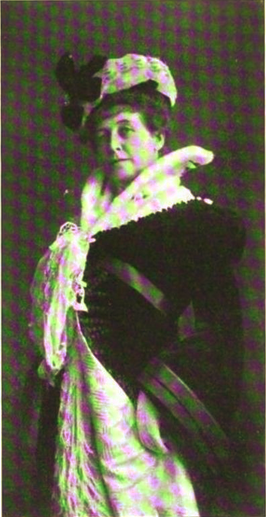
Alice Brownlee (1902)

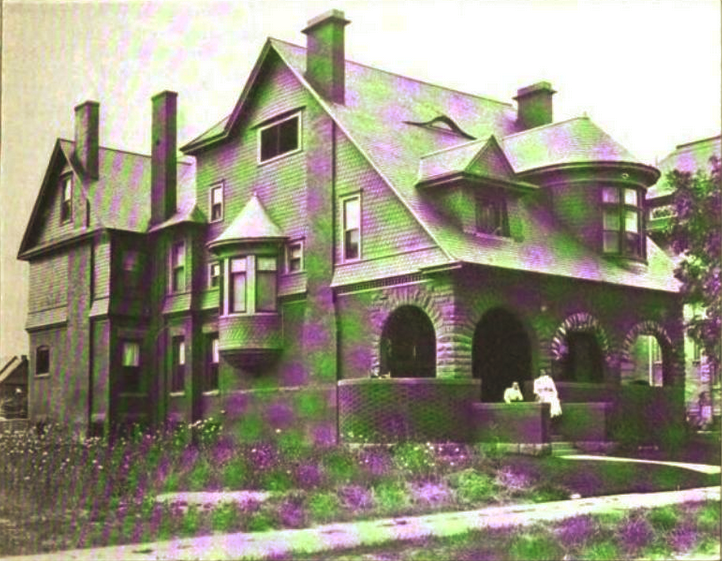
Brownlee residence, Denver, Colorado

On April 10, 1900, in Milwaukee, Wisconsin, she married Col. Archibald Graham Brownlee (1857–1912), a wealthy miner of Denver. Since this marriage, Houghton appeared somewhat less prominently in active business. She was widowed again in 1912.

== Personal life ==
Houghton was also a clubwoman with large social connections. She was a charter member and first president (1892–93) of the Sorosis of Spokane.

Alice A. Ide Houghton Brownlee died in Chicago, August 19, 1920.
