= Orlando Brown (Wisconsin politician) =

American politician (1828–1910)

Orlando Brown (December 29, 1828 – December 22, 1910) was an American farmer from Modena, Wisconsin who spent one year as a member of the Wisconsin State Assembly and two years as a member of the Wisconsin State Senate.

== Background ==
Brown was born in the town of Collins in Erie County, New York on December 29, 1828; he received a public school education, and became a farmer. He came to Wisconsin in 1842, first settling in Elkhorn. He left Wisconsin for Oregon and California in 1852 and remained two years before returning to Wisconsin, and in 1855 became a resident of Buffalo County. He became the first white settler of the Modena valley area in 1856.

== Legislative service ==
Brown was elected for the 1862 Assembly session as a Republican from a district encompassing all of the sparsely populated Buffalo, Pepin and Trempealeau counties, succeeding fellow Republican Calvin R. Johnson. The Wisconsin Farmer magazine characterized him as among the "Straight Republicans" as opposed to "Independent or Union Republicans". He was succeeded in the next session by Republican Alfred W. Newman.

In the election of 1871, he was elected to Wisconsin Senate, District 32 (Buffalo, Clark, Jackson and Trempealeau counties) as a Liberal Republican, with 2,112 votes to 1626 for the regular Republican, former State Representative Conrad Moser, Jr. and 647 for Democrat Jacob Spaulding. (Republican incumbent William T. Price was not a candidate for re-election.) He was assigned to the standing committees on military affairs and on contingent expenses. In the next year's session, he was shifted to the committees on agriculture and on town and county organization. He was not a candidate for re-election in 1873, and was succeeded by regular Republican Robert C. Field.

== After the legislature ==
In August 1900, he bought four farms in Lake County, Illinois near Waukegan, Illinois, reportedly to be run by his four sons. He died December 22, 1910.
