= Calvin R. Johnson =

American politician

Calvin R. Johnson (May 22, 1822 – January 30, 1897) was a member of the Wisconsin State Assembly.

== Biography ==
Johnson was born on May 22, 1822, in Foxborough, Massachusetts. In 1846, he moved to Black River Falls, Wisconsin. On February 5, 1852, he married Lucy A. Marsh. They had six children, one of whom became Register of Deeds and Judge of Jackson County, Wisconsin. Johnson died on January 30, 1897, in Black River Falls.

== Military career ==
During the American Civil War, Johnson was a captain with the 14th Wisconsin Volunteer Infantry Regiment. Previously, he had served in the United States Army during the Mexican–American War under Winfield Scott.

== Political career ==
Johnson represented the counties of Buffalo, Jackson and Trempealeau in the Assembly. He was succeeded by Orlando Brown, who represented an altered district. Additionally, Johnson was Register of Deeds and District Attorney of Jackson County. He was a Republican.
