= Conrad Moser Jr. =

American politician

Conrad Moser

Member of the Wisconsin State Assembly from the Buffalo district
- In office January 7, 1867 – January 4, 1869
- Preceded by: William H. Thomas (Buffalo–Pepin–Trempealeau)
- Succeeded by: Robert Henry

Personal details
- Born: April 28, 1835 Switzerland
- Died: July 4, 1903 (aged 68) Fruitvale, California, U.S.
- Resting place: Holy Cross Catholic Cemetery, Colma, California
- Party: Republican; Natl. Union (1863–1867)
- Spouse(s): Verena Dunkel (died 1869) Margaret Theisen (m. 1870; died 1899)
- Children: with Dunkel; 4 children; with Theisen; 5 children

Conrad Moser, Jr., (April 28, 1835 – July 4, 1903) was a Swiss American immigrant, lawyer, and Republican politician. He served two years in the Wisconsin State Assembly, representing Buffalo County.

== Biography ==
Moser was born on April 28, 1835, in Switzerland' Canton of Zurich. He moved to Alma, Wisconsin in 1855.

He was first married to Verena Dunkel. They had four children before her death in 1869. Moser later married Margaret Theisen. They had five children. After moving to California, he was arrested for burglary in 1900, but the charge was reduced to disturbing the peace. Moser died in Fruitvale, California, on July 4, 1903.

== Career ==
Moser was appointed Clerk of Buffalo County, Wisconsin, in 1861 and was elected to the position in 1862 and 1864. He served in the Assembly from 1867 to 1868. In 1871, Moser ran for the Wisconsin State Senate, losing to Orlando Brown. Later, he was elected Buffalo County Judge in 1877 and 1879. He was a Republican.
