= Sioux Creek, Barron County, Wisconsin =

Town in Barron County, Wisconsin

Sioux Creek, Wisconsin
- Town
- Town of Sioux Creek
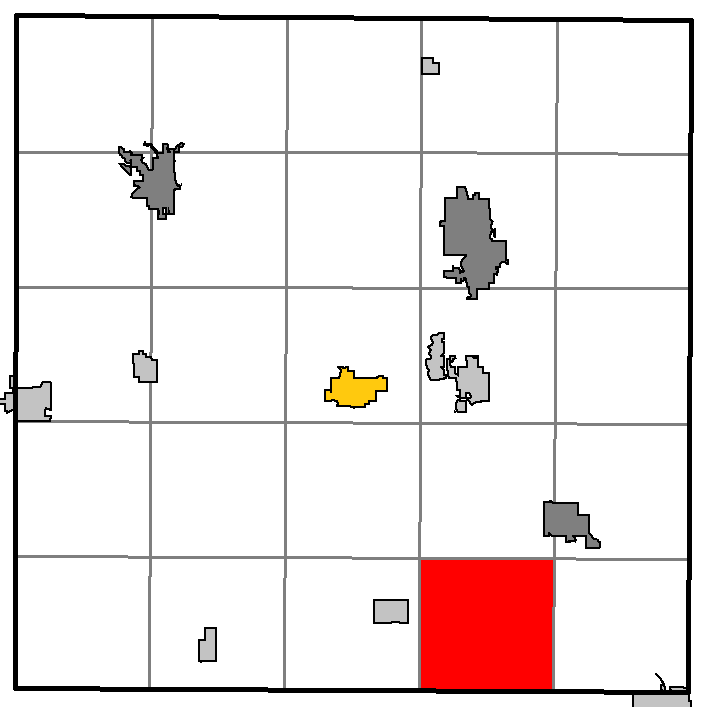
- Location of Sioux Creek, within Barron County, Wisconsin

- Location of Barron County, Wisconsin
- Coordinates: 45°15′03″N 91°44′21″W
- Country: United States
- State: Wisconsin
- County: Barron

Area
  - Total: 35.26 sq mi (91.3 km^{2})
  - Land: 34.94 sq mi (90.5 km^{2})
  - Water: 0.32 sq mi (0.83 km^{2})

Population (2020)
  - Total: 667
  - Density: 19.1/sq mi (7.37/km^{2})
- Time zone: UTC-6 (Central (CST))
  - Summer (DST): UTC-5 (CDT)
- ZIP Code: 54728
- Area code(s): 715 & 534
- GNIS feature ID: 1584163
- Website: townofsiouxcreek.gov

Sioux Creek is a town in Barron County in the U.S. state of Wisconsin. The population was 667 at the 2020 census, up from 655 at the 2010 census.

== Geography ==
Sioux Creek is located in southeastern Barron County, with the Dunn County line forming its southern border. The Red Cedar River, a tributary of the Chippewa River, crosses the town from north to south.

According to the United States Census Bureau, the town has a total area of 35.3 square miles (91.3 km^{2}), of which 34.9 square miles (90.5 km^{2}) is land and 0.31 square miles (0.8 km^{2}), or 0.90%, is water.

== Demographics ==
As of the census of 2000, there were 689 people, 225 households, and 186 families residing in the town. The population density was 19.7 people per square mile (7.6/km^{2}). There were 244 housing units at an average density of 7 per square mile (2.7/km^{2}). The racial makeup of the town was 99.27% White, 0.29% Native American, and 0.44% from two or more races.

There were 225 households, out of which 41.3% had children under the age of 18 living with them, 69.8% were married couples living together, 8% had a female householder with no husband present, and 17.3% were non-families. 13.3% of all households were made up of individuals, and 4% had someone living alone who was 65 years of age or older. The average household size was 3.06 and the average family size was 3.39.

In the town, the population was spread out, with 31.5% under the age of 18, 10% from 18 to 24, 27.1% from 25 to 44, 22.1% from 45 to 64, and 9.3% who were 65 years of age or older. The median age was 32 years. For every 100 females, there were 106.9 males. For every 100 females aged 18 and over, there were 105.2 males.

The median income for a household in the town was $47,083, and the median income for a family was $51,125. Males had a median income of $31,944 versus $19,605 for females. The per capita income for the town was $14,746. About 3.4% of families and 5.7% of the population were below the poverty line, including 4.9% of those under age 18 and 14.3% of those age 65 or over.
