= James L. Linderman =

American politician

James L. Linderman was a member of the Wisconsin State Assembly.

== Biography ==
Linderman was born on April 4, 1827, in Ithaca, New York. On February 8, 1849, he married Abigail Williams. Linderman settled in Osseo, Wisconsin, in 1872. He died on October 6, 1906, in Osseo and was buried there.

== Legislative career ==
Linderman was a member of the Assembly during the 1877 session. In 1890, he was a candidate for the Wisconsin State Senate. He was a Republican.
