= Gilmanton, Wisconsin =

- Town
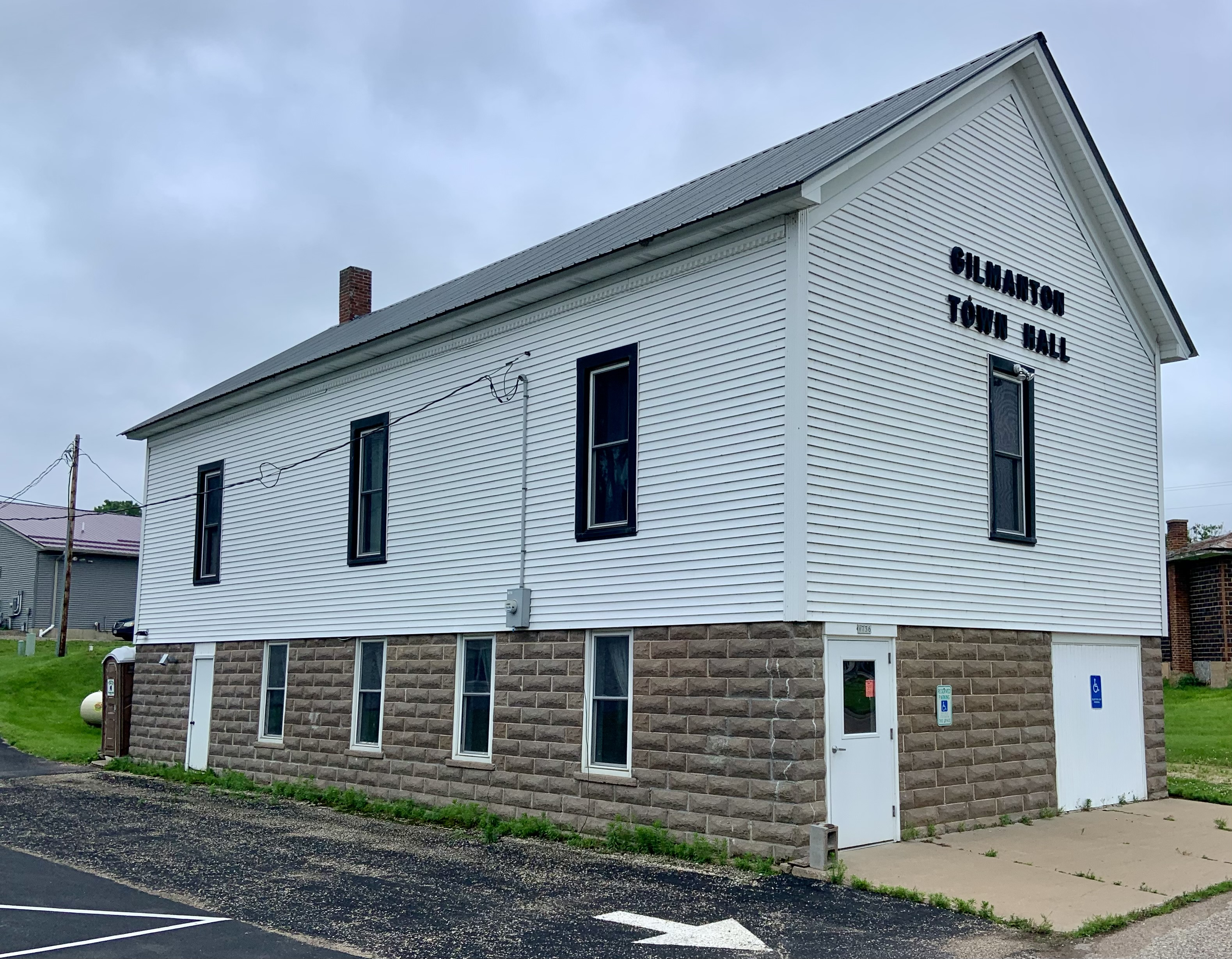
- Town hall
- Motto: Home of Wisconsin's Biggest Little Fair!
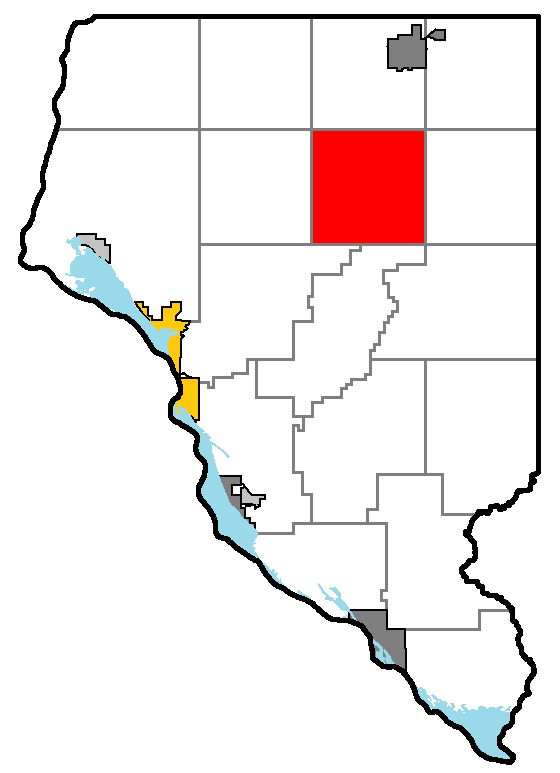
- Location of Gilmanton, Buffalo County

- Location of Buffalo County, Wisconsin
- Coordinates: 44°28′17″N 91°41′40″W
- Country: United States
- State: Wisconsin
- County: Buffalo

Area
  - Total: 36.3 sq mi (94.0 km^{2})
  - Land: 35.9 sq mi (92.9 km^{2})
  - Water: 0.42 sq mi (1.1 km^{2})
- Elevation: 801 ft (244 m)

Population (2020)
  - Total: 425
  - Density: 11.8/sq mi (4.57/km^{2})
- Time zone: UTC-6 (Central (CST))
  - Summer (DST): UTC-5 (CDT)
- Postal code: 54743
- Area codes: 715 & 534
- FIPS code: 55-29225
- GNIS feature ID: 1583277

Gilmanton (/ˈɡɪlməntən/ GHIL-mən-tən) is a town in Buffalo County, Wisconsin, United States. The population was 425 at the 2020 census. The unincorporated community of Gilmanton is located in the town.

== History ==
Gilmanton was first settled by Samuel Gilman in 1855. He and his four sons started to live upon the land, building cabins and cutting hay for their animal stock. The same year the first child, a girl, was born in Gilman Valley. The first religious meeting was held in a house of one of the settlers, overseen by Rev. B.F. Morse. In 1858 the first post office was established, with William Loumis as the first postmaster. Gilmanton Township was initially called the "Loomis Settlement." The name was changed to Gilmanton May 25, 1858.

== Geography ==
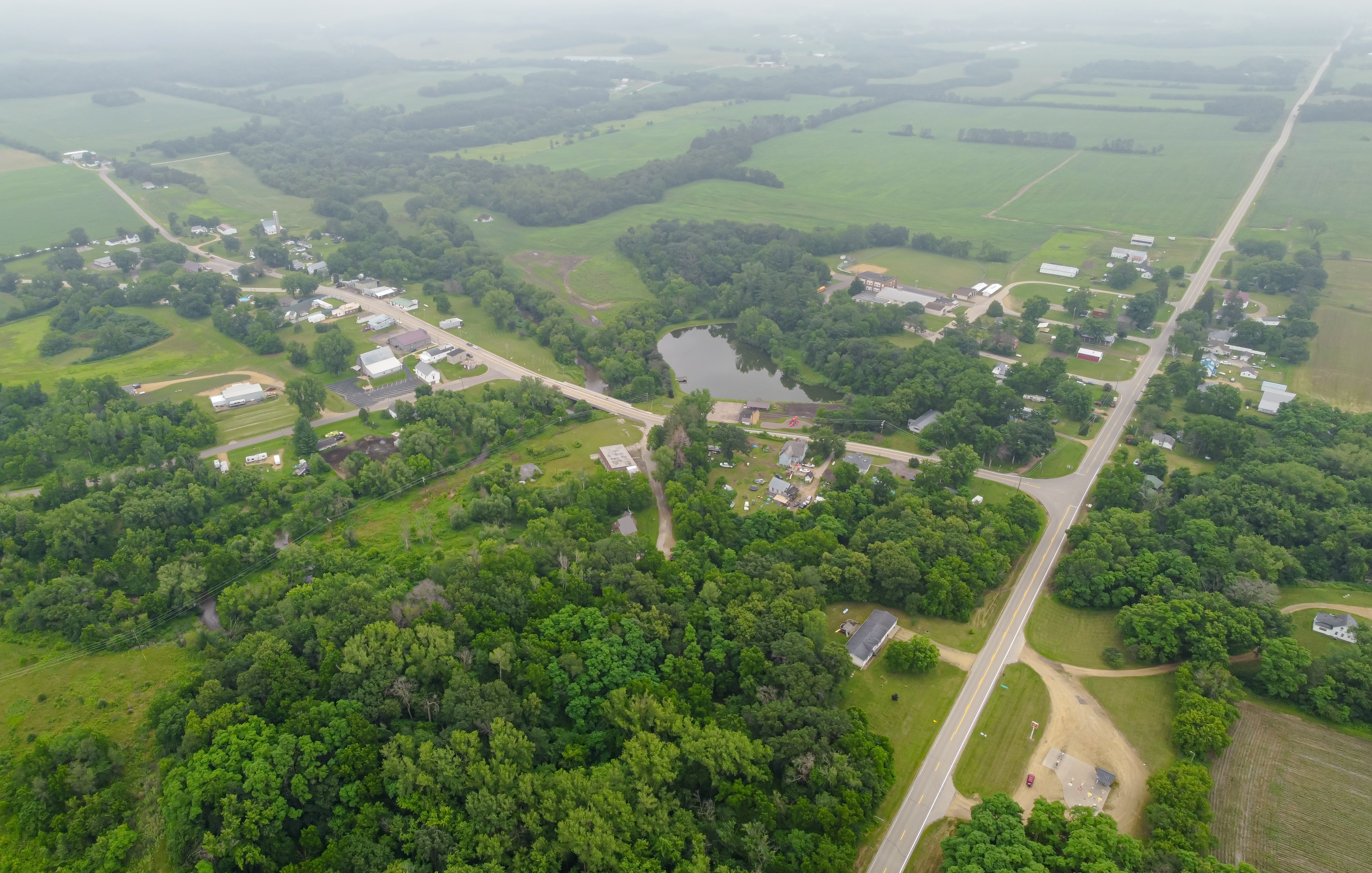
Wis-88 and Wis-121 junction in town

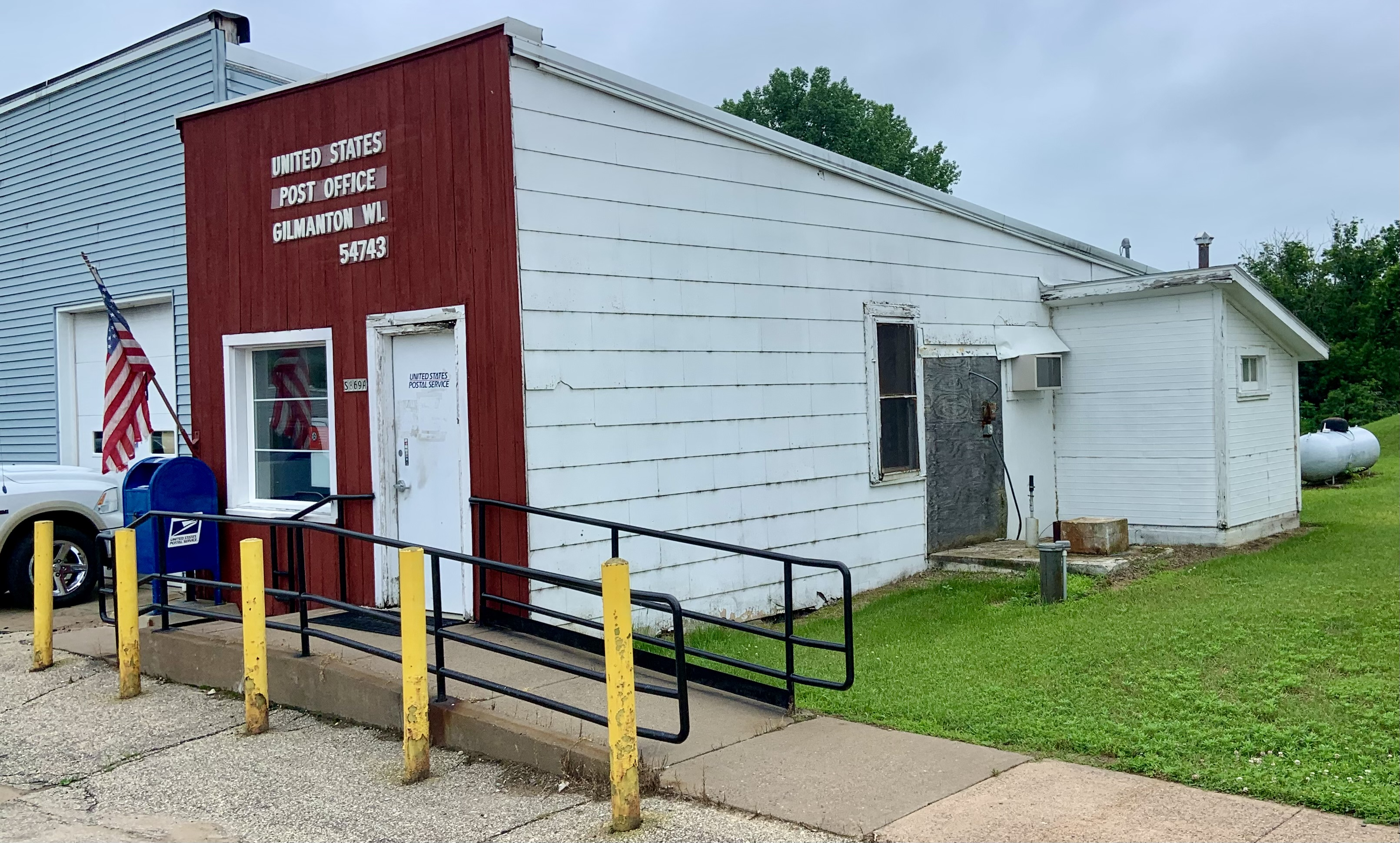
Gilmanton Post Office

According to the United States Census Bureau, the town has a total area of 36.3 square miles (94.0 km^{2}), of which 35.9 square miles (92.9 km^{2}) is land and 0.42 square miles (1.1 km^{2}), or 1.20%, is water.

== Demographics ==
As of the census of 2000, there were 470 people, 173 households, and 126 families residing in the town. The population density was 13.0 people per square mile (5.0/km^{2}). There were 180 housing units at an average density of 5.0 per square mile (1.9/km^{2}). The racial makeup of the town was 99.57% White, and 0.43% from two or more races.

There were 173 households, out of which 35.3% had children under the age of 18 living with them, 68.2% were married couples living together, 2.9% had a female householder with no husband present, and 26.6% were non-families. 20.8% of all households were made up of individuals, and 6.9% had someone living alone who was 65 years of age or older. The average household size was 2.72 and the average family size was 3.20.

In the town, the population was spread out, with 28.5% under the age of 18, 4.3% from 18 to 24, 29.6% from 25 to 44, 22.3% from 45 to 64, and 15.3% who were 65 years of age or older. The median age was 37 years. For every 100 females, there were 101.7 males. For every 100 females age 18 and over, there were 114.0 males.

The median income for a household in the town was $30,156, and the median income for a family was $35,469. Males had a median income of $25,000 versus $20,268 for females. The per capita income for the town was $14,769. About 4.6% of families and 7.3% of the population were below the poverty line, including 11.1% of those under age 18 and none of those age 65 or over.

== Arts and culture ==
The Gilmanton Free Fair has been held annually since 1947. Activities include a tractor pulling contest, a barbecue cook-off, a bean bag tournament, a softball tournament, and more. The event raises funds for school and community projects.

== Notable people ==
- Harold R. W. Benjamin (1893–1969), American educator and writer; wrote "The Saber-Tooth Curriculum" (1939), was born in the town
- Charles W. Gilman (1862–1938), Wisconsin State Representative and lawyer, was born in the town
- Franklin Gilman (1825–1880), Wisconsin State Representative and farmer, lived in the town
- Elmer A. Kenyon (1870–1922), Wisconsin State Representative, farmer, and businessman, was born in the town
- Edward Lees (c. 1819–1893), politician, lived in the town
- Edwin J. Peterson (born 1930), Oregon Supreme Court Chief Justice, was born and lived in the town
