= John J. Senn =

American politician from Wisconsin

John Jacob Senn (March 28, 1828 – May 20, 1893) was a member of the Wisconsin State Assembly.

== Biography ==
Senn was born in Toggenburg, Switzerland in March 1828, sources have differed on the exact date. He became a bugler in the Swiss military. In 1855, he settled in Fountain City, Wisconsin. Jobs Senn held up to that point include that of teacher. On May 8, 1861, he married Elsbeth Weibel. They had three children. During the American Civil War, Senn enlisted with the 9th Wisconsin Volunteer Infantry Regiment of the Union Army. Later, he became involved in the insurance industry, including working as an agent.

== Political career ==
Senn was a member of the Assembly in 1877 and 1878. Other positions he held include County Treasurer and a member and President of the Board of Supervisors of Buffalo County, Wisconsin. He was a Republican.
