= Franklin Gilman =

American politician (1825–1880)

Franklin Gilman (April 21, 1825 – December 1, 1880) was an American farmer and politician.

Born in Lisbon, Grafton County, New Hampshire, Gilman moved to Wisconsin, in 1854, and settled in Buffalo County, Wisconsin. He was a farmer and served as president of the Buffalo County Agricultural Society. In 1857, the town of Gilmanton was organized and named after him. Gilman served as the first chairman of the Gilman Town Board and was a Republican. In 1880, Gilman served in the Wisconsin State Assembly and died while still in office in 1880.
