= Edward Lees =

Wisconsin politician

Edward Lees (c. 1819 - November 6, 1893) was a member of the Wisconsin State Assembly.

== Biography ==
A Scottish immigrant, Lees first settled in Ottawa, Wisconsin in 1848. His son, Robert Lees, became a member of the Assembly and the Wisconsin State Senate. He died at his home in Gilmanton, Wisconsin on November 6, 1893.

== Career ==
Lees was a member of the Assembly in 1853 and again from 1875 to 1876. In addition, he was chairman of Belvidere, Wisconsin and Cross, Wisconsin and district attorney of Buffalo County, Wisconsin.
