= Charles D. Madsen =

American politician

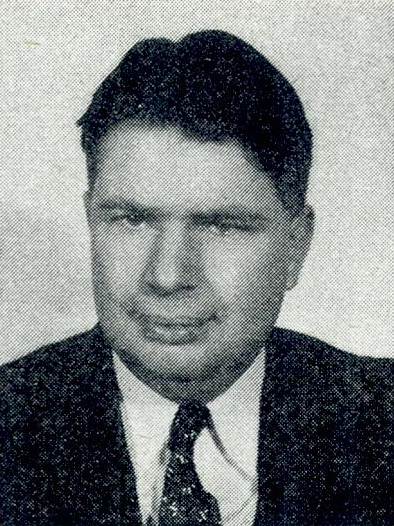
Madsen c. 1944

Charles D. Madsen (November 6, 1906 – February 21, 1975) was a politician in Wisconsin. He was elected to the Wisconsin State Senate. He was also a candidate for the United States House of Representatives twice. He lost to Charles W. Henney as a member of the Socialist Party of America in 1932 for the seat representing Wisconsin's 2nd congressional district and to incumbent Alvin O'Konski in 1948 in the Republican primary for the seat representing Wisconsin's 10th congressional district.

Madsen was born in Durham, Connecticut. He received his bachelor's degree from Harvard University, went to University of Chicago, and received his law degree from University of Wisconsin Law School. He lived in Luck, Wisconsin and served as municipal judge, justice of the peace, district attorney of Polk County, Wisconsin, and on the Luck Village Board. He was a Progressive.
