= Horace E. Houghton =

American politician

Member of the Wisconsin State Assembly

Member of the Wisconsin State Senate
- In office 1879–1880

Member of the Washington State Senate from the 1st district
- In office 1889–1891
- Preceded by: office established
- Succeeded by: F. H. Luce

Member of the Washington State Senate from the 4th district
- In office 1897 – August 25, 1897
- Preceded by: C. W. Ide
- Succeeded by: Herman D. Crow

Personal details
- Born: April 6, 1835 Alexander, New York
- Died: August 25, 1897 (aged 62) Spokane, Washington
- Party: Republican; Populist
- Spouse: Alice Ide

Horace E. Houghton (April 6, 1835 – August 25, 1897) was an American politician and lawyer.

Born in Alexander, Genesee County, New York, Houghton moved to East Troy, Wisconsin in 1857. In 1862, Houghton moved to Durand, Wisconsin. He served as district attorney for Pepin County, Wisconsin for eight years. In 1873, Houghton served in the Wisconsin State Assembly and was a Republican. Then, he served in the Wisconsin State Senate in 1879 and 1880. Houghton moved to Spokane, Washington Territory, 1884, and served as corporation counsel for the City of Spokane. In 1889 and 1897, Houghton served in the Washington State Senate. Houghton died in Augustana Hospital in Spokane after suffering a stroke.
