= George E. Scott =

American politician

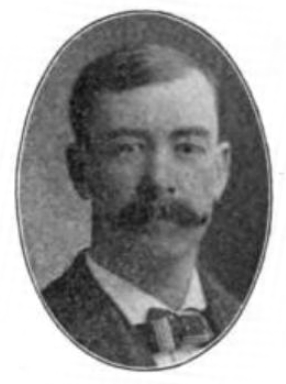

Member of the Wisconsin State Senate
- In office 1910–1918

Member of the Wisconsin State Assembly
- In office 1904–1910
- Constituency: Barron County

Personal details
- Born: July 3, 1860 Durand, Wisconsin
- Died: November 9, 1915 (aged 55) Prairie Farm, Wisconsin
- Party: Republican
- Occupation: Merchant, miller, politician

George E. Scott (July 3, 1860 – November 9, 1915) was a member of the Wisconsin State Assembly and the Wisconsin State Senate.

== Biography ==
Scott was born on July 3, 1860, in Durand, Wisconsin. He died at his home in Prairie Farm, Wisconsin, on November 9, 1915.

== Career ==
Scott was elected to the Assembly in 1904 and was re-elected in 1906 and 1908. Later, he was elected to the Senate in 1910 and re-elected in 1914. He was a Republican.
