= Carl B. Casperson =

American politician

Carl B. Casperson (August 17, 1877 – July 7, 1953) was a member of the Wisconsin State Senate from 1923 to 1930. He was also a delegate to the 1924 Republican National Convention. He was born in Laketown, Wisconsin, and died in Frederic, Wisconsin.

Casperson was in the lumber business. He was also involved with the banking and telephone businesses. In 1917, he served in the Wisconsin State Assembly. Casperson also served on the Polk County Board of Supervisors. He served on the school board and was the board clerk.
