= List of unincorporated communities in Dunn County, Wisconsin =

There are a number of unincorporated communities in Dunn County, Wisconsin. These fall into four basic types:

- Historical communities (no longer in existence) (†), some remain as ghost towns (‡)
- Former communities since annexed into larger municipalities (*)
- Modern-day small communities, too small to consider incorporation (§)
- Modern-day areas recognized as census-designated places by the United States Census Bureau (°)

This incomplete list, arranged here as they fall within present-day divisions of Dunn County, these are:

- Town of Dunn
  - Downsville §
  - Dunnville §
- Town of Eau Galle
  - Eau Galle §
  - Welch Point
- Town of Hay River
  - Baxter
- City of Menomonie
  - Menomonie Junction, Wisconsin *
  - North Menomonie, Wisconsin *
- Town of Menomonie
  - Cedar Falls §
  - Irvington §
- Town of New Haven
  - Connorsville §
  - Graytown § (partial)
- Town of Peru
  - Meridean §
  - Old Tyrone ‡
  - Red Cedar
- Town of Red Cedar
  - Rusk §
- Town of Rock Creek
  - Caryville §
  - Rock Falls §
  - Old Meridean ‡
- Town of Sand Creek
  - Sand Creek §
- Town of Spring Brook
  - Elk Lake §
  - Falls City §
- Town of Tainter
  - Norton
  - Tainter Lake °
- Town of Weston
  - Comfort §
  - Hatchville §
  - Weston §

== See also ==
- List of unincorporated communities in Wisconsin
