= George Harris Chamberlin =

19th century American politician

George H. Chamberlin

Member of the Wisconsin State Assembly from the Dunn County district
- In office January 3, 1881 – January 2, 1882
- Preceded by: John McGilton
- Succeeded by: Edward L. Everts

Personal details
- Born: January 12, 1827 Canaan, New Hampshire, U.S.
- Died: July 16, 1921 (aged 94) Fairbanks Township, St. Louis County, Minnesota, U.S.
- Resting place: Rock Falls Cemetery, Rock Falls, Dunn County, Wisconsin
- Party: Republican
- Spouse: Antoinette Weston (m. 1852; died 1909)
- Children: Daniel Preston Chamberlin^{(b. 1853; died 1901)}; Jehiel Weston Chamberlin^{(b. 1857; died 1921)}; Laura Chamberlin^{(b. 1859; died 1861)}; Frank H. Chamberlin^{(b. 1861; died 1926)}; George Harris Chamberlin^{(b. 1865; died 1909)}; Nettie C. (McNeel)^{(b. 1869; died 1962)}

George Harris Chamberlin (January 12, 1827 – July 16, 1921) was an American farmer, Republican politician, and Wisconsin pioneer. He served one term as a member of the Wisconsin State Assembly, representing Dunn County during the 1881 term. He and his family were some of the earliest American settlers in the Chippewa Valley, and are considered the founders of Rock Falls, Dunn County, Wisconsin. He served fifty years as postmaster at Rock Falls, from 1857 to 1907.

== Biography ==
George H. Chamberlin was born January 12, 1827, in Grafton County, New Hampshire. As a child, he moved with his parents to Brunswick, New York, and shortly after moved to Newbury, Vermont, where Chamberlin received most of his education. After completing his basic education, he went to work at a meat market in Manchester, New Hampshire, for two years, then took a similar job in Clinton, Massachusetts.

In 1851, he went west to the new state of Wisconsin, initially settling at Briggsville, in Marquette County. After four years there, he continued west to Dunn County, Wisconsin, purchasing 400 acres of land in the town of Rock Creek. Shortly after his arrival, he worked with his father-in-law in establishing the first mill in the area. Later, his brother, Hiram, joined him and helped to run the mill. With his father-in-law, they also started a general merchandise store in the new community. Chamberlin would sell the mill in 1868, but would continue operating the store for 46 years. Chamberlin also ordered the a survey and plat of the settlement in 1875.

In 1857, Chamberlin was also appointed the first postmaster at Rock Falls. He ultimately served fifty years as postmaster, retiring in 1907 as the oldest postmaster in the country.

Chamberlin was elected to the Wisconsin State Assembly in the 1880 election, running on the Republican Party ticket. He served only one term in the Assembly, in the 34th Wisconsin Legislature.

== Personal life and family ==
George H. Chamberlin was the second of at least nine children born to Dr. Preston Chamberlin and his wife Laura (née Huntley). The Chamberlins were descendants of the colonist Richard Chamberlin, who emigrated from England to the Massachusetts Bay Colony about 1640.

George Chamberlin married Antoinette Weston on June 29, 1852, at Briggsville, Wisconsin. They had six children, though one daughter died in infancy. Ultimately, Chamberlin outlived all but two of his children, living to age 94.

He died at the home of his daughter, in Fairbanks Township, St. Louis County, Minnesota, on July 16, 1921.

Wisconsin State Assembly
Preceded by John McGilton	Member of the Wisconsin State Assembly from the Dunn County district January 3, 1881 – January 2, 1882	Succeeded by Edward L. Everts
