= Caryville =

Caryville may refer to some places in the United States:

- Caryville, Florida
- Caryville, Massachusetts
- Caryville, Tennessee
- Caryville, Wisconsin
