= Red Cedar State Trail =

State trail in Dunn County, Wisconsin

- Length: 14.5 miles (23.3 km)
- Location: Dunn County, Wisconsin, United States
- Website: dnr.wisconsin.gov/topic/parks/redcedar

The Red Cedar State Trail is a 14.5-mile (23.3 km) rail trail which runs along the Red Cedar River in Dunn County, Wisconsin. The trail runs north-south from Wisconsin Highway 29 in Menomonie to the Chippewa River State Trail in Red Cedar, passing through the communities of Irvington and Downsville along the way. The northern end of the trail has a visitor center in a former railroad station where trail passes can be purchased.

The Wisconsin Department of Natural Resources opened the trail in 1982. The trail follows the route of a former Milwaukee Road railway line which was last used in 1973. It crosses eleven converted railroad bridges, including two trestle bridges.
