= Murder of Alex Woodworth =

2018 murder in Wisconsin, US

- Spring Brook (Wisconsin)
- Location: Spring Brook, Wisconsin, United States
- Date: March 22, 2018
- Attack type: Homicide
- Weapon: Knife
- Victim: Alex Woodworth
- Perpetrator: Ezra J. McCandless

Alex Woodworth
- Born: January 1, 1994; St. Croix Falls, Wisconsin, U.S.
- Died: March 22, 2018 (aged 24)
- Cause of death: Murder
- Body discovered: March 23, 2018

Ezra J. McCandless
- Born: Monica Kay; October 6, 1997 (age 29); Stanley, Wisconsin, U.S.
- Other name: Monica Karlen
- Status: Incarcerated
- Conviction: First degree intentional homicide
- Penalty: Life imprisonment (minimum of 50 years)

Details
- Victims: Alex Woodworth
- Date apprehended: April 6, 2018
- Imprisoned at: Taycheedah Correctional Institution in Fond du Lac, Wisconsin

On March 22, 2018, Alex Woodworth was stabbed 16 times in the head, neck, groin, and torso in Ezra McCandless' car in Spring Brook, Wisconsin, United States. McCandless was tried, convicted, and sentenced to life imprisonment in 2020 for the murder.

== Murder ==
On March 22, 2018, 20-year-old McCandless turned up unannounced and saw ex-boyfriend, 24-year-old Alex Woodworth, at Racy D'Lenes Coffee Lounge in Eau Claire. She was seen on the coffee shop's security footage. McCandless' ex-boyfriend Jason Mengel later mentioned that McCandless had seemed agitated. McCandless left the coffee shop and went to visit Woodworth at his house, as she claimed she had some items to return to him. Mengel said that he felt there was something odd about the way she was acting and things she had said.

Mengel rode his bike to Woodworth's house in an attempt to find McCandless and spotted her 2003 Chevy Impala outside, the car's engine still running. While waiting for McCandless, he was seen outside pacing back and forth by a passerby, who thought it looked suspicious and phoned the police. After waiting for around 45 minutes, Mengel went inside the house without knocking. He stated that he found McCandless and Woodworth in the middle of a conversation. He walked back outside to wait for them to finish talking and was met by the Eau Claire police. Mengel explained to the officers that he was there because he was concerned about McCandless, as “she was not acting like herself”. In police dash cam footage, an officer can then be seen speaking to Woodworth outside of his house, who is standing next to McCandless's car. McCandless was sitting in her car in the drivers seat, but is not visible in the video. At about 1:05 pm, satisfied that there was not a problem, the officers and Mengel left. This was the last time he saw Woodworth alive.

A few hours later, about 4:15 pm, McCandless knocked on the door of dairy farmer Don Sipple, in Spring Brook, near Eau Claire. She was covered in mud, blood and bruises, and barefoot. She asked for a doctor, claiming she was a victim of an assault.

She was taken to a local hospital, where she asked for Jason Mengel. She initially told officers, paramedics and hospital staff that she could not remember what had happened.

Detectives were unable to find Woodworth that night. The next day while searching around the dairy farm, officers saw footprints in the mud on the ground. They then found Woodworth's body hanging out of the back of McCandless's 2003 Chevy Impala on a dirt road, near the farmhouse. He had suffered 16 stab wounds to his head, neck, groin and torso. The car was stuck in the dirt.

== Arrest and trial ==
Two weeks after Alex Woodworth was found dead, on April 6, 2018, McCandless was arrested and charged with first-degree intentional homicide.

The trial started on October 15, 2019, at the Dunn County Judicial Center, 18 months after the stabbing. At the trial, the prosecution highlighted the inconsistencies in McCandless's stories and the crime scene. She was unable to recall what had happened when first interviewed, and told officers and paramedics that arrived at the farm that she could not remember. In a recorded interview, after Dunn County officers told her that they had found her car and Alex's body, she eventually said that he had attacked her, and said she had not been able to get it out of her head. She claimed he had also carved ‘BOY’ into her arm, which she later admitted was her own doing. She changed her story of the attack from when she was first interviewed, to the trial. She initially stated "And I cut my hand, because I kept trying to grab him. And then I finally got free, and I finally got the knife away from him". She later said at the trial, "I decided then to knee him in the groin, and he drops the knife at that point. Instantly, I grab the knife. I started stabbing him anywhere and everywhere I could". McCandless claimed that Woodworth had attacked her in the back seat of her car, however most of the blood evidence at the scene was found outside of the car. In an interview, prior to Alex's body being found, she had said that the incident happened at Owen Park, in Eau Claire, which the prosecution says was to direct authorities away from the real scene.

The knife used to kill Woodworth was confirmed to be from McCandless's father's house. Her father, Joshane, stated at the trial he had previously given his daughter knives.

Dr. Tillotson, who had treated McCandless in the ER and assessed her injuries, testified that her knife wounds appeared to have the characteristics of self-inflicted wounds. He also said she had trouble recalling what had happened, and had asked for Jason Mengel.

McCandless took Woodworth's phone when she left the scene. The prosecution alleged this was to leave him no means of being able to contact anyone, had he been able to. They also said McCandless had stabbed Woodworth in hopes of preventing him getting in the way of her rekindling her relationship with Mengel.

The defense claimed that Woodworth was angry that McCandless did not want to be with him. Her defense attorney stated that she was fighting for her life after Woodworth forced himself upon her, and then attacked her.

She testified that she had stabbed him – 16 times – in self-defense, and she just wanted to try and get away.

== Conviction and sentencing ==
On November 1, 2019, McCandless was convicted of first degree intentional homicide in the stabbing death of 24-year-old Woodworth. She was held at Dunn County Jail in Menomonie, Wisconsin, until her sentencing date.

On February 7, 2020, then-22-year-old McCandless was sentenced to life in prison, with eligibility for parole after 50 years, for the first-degree intentional homicide of Alex Woodworth. McCandless’s mother, Roselenna Gunelson, pleaded with the court to grant her daughter the possibility to petition for parole after 20 years. Woodworth’s aunt, Crystal Hall, said in her impact statement at the sentencing, “throughout the trial we never saw any sign of sadness, shame, compassion, or the slight bit of remorse for what you had done”.

McCandless tried multiple times to overturn her conviction, and her third petition was filed October 3, 2025.

As of 2026, she is incarcerated at Taycheedah Correctional Institution in Fond du Lac, Wisconsin.
