= Rock Falls, Dunn County, Wisconsin =

Rock Falls, Wisconsin
- Unincorporated community
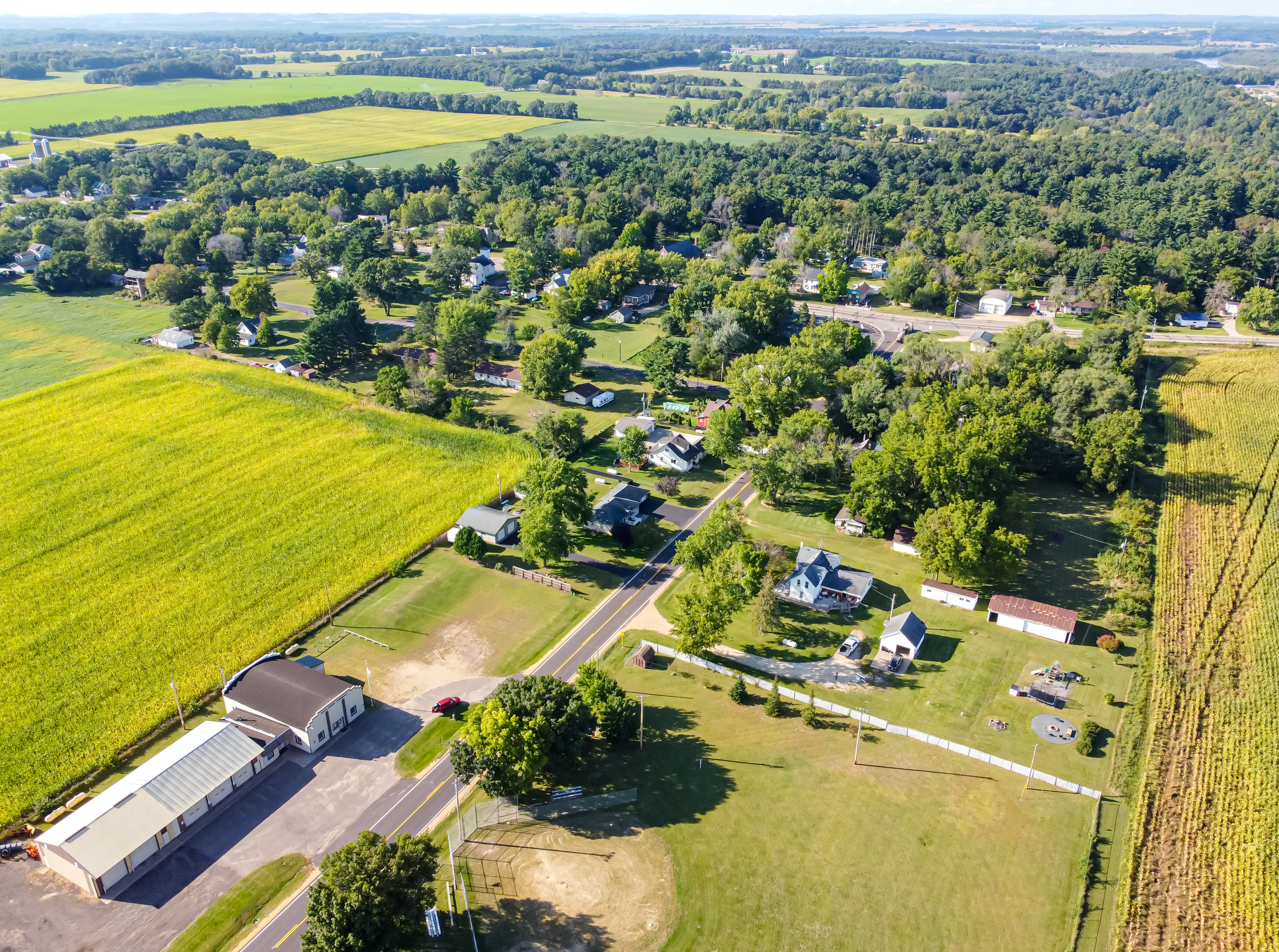

- Location within Wisconsin Location within the United States
- Coordinates: 44.71861°N 91.68972°W
- Country: United States
- State: Wisconsin
- County: Dunn
- Elevation: 860 ft (260 m)
- Time zone: UTC-6 (Central (CST))
  - Summer (DST): UTC-5 (CDT)
- Area codes: 715 & 534
- GNIS feature ID: 1572444

Rock Falls is an unincorporated community in the town of Rock Creek, Dunn County, Wisconsin, United States. The community is located approximately 3 miles (4.8 km) south-southwest of Caryville and 7 miles (11 km) southeast of Meridean, on Wisconsin State Highway 85.

One of the community's attractions is the nearby Rock Falls Raceway, a drag racing track. Rock Falls' ZIP Code is 54764.
