= Dunn, Wisconsin =

Dunn may refer to:

- Dunn, Dane County, Wisconsin
- Dunn, Dunn County, Wisconsin
