= Ashlee Martinson =

American murderer

- Born: March 6, 1998 (age 28); United States
- Other name: Vampchick
- Citizenship: United States
- Parent: Jennifer Ayers
- Status: Incarcerated
- Motive: Childhood abuse
- Conviction: Second degree intentional homicide (2 counts)
- Penalty: 23 years imprisonment
- Capture status: Incarcerated

Details
- Victims: Thomas "Tony" Ayers, 37; Jennifer Ayers, 40
- Date: March 7, 2015
- Locations: Piehl, Wisconsin
- Weapons: Shotgun; Knife
- Date apprehended: March 8, 2015

Ashlee Anne Rose Martinson (born March 6, 1998) is an American woman convicted of the 2015 murders of her mother and stepfather, which she committed the day after her 17th birthday. Martinson's case received international attention. Martinson later pleaded guilty to two counts of second degree intentional homicide and was sentenced to 23 years in prison.

== Background ==
Ashlee remained estranged from her biological father and lived with her mother, stepfather, two stepsisters and a half sister. She had moved to Rhinelander, Wisconsin with her family at age sixteen.

Martinson was allegedly verbally abused by Thomas "Tony" Ayers, in the events leading up to his murder. He had also verbally and physically abused both his wife and his biological daughters in the household. These details were confirmed by her younger siblings. Martinson also claimed she had been physically abused and raped for a period of two years by a former boyfriend of her mother. Martinson said the man had raped her and burned her with cigarettes when she was nine. She also said her mother was aware of the abuse, but did nothing.

During her interviews, experts believed she has post-traumatic stress disorder and depression.

Thomas Ayers had previous convictions of kidnapping, sexual assault, domestic abuse and various other charges. Although he was forbidden from owning firearms, he owned a variety, which were kept loaded, and reportedly easily accessible in the home. Martinson admitted that Ayers never physically or sexually abused her, but said he verbally and emotionally abused her and beat her mother.

== Crime ==
On March 7, 2015, at their home in Piehl, Wisconsin, Martinson got into an argument with her mother and stepfather after they discovered she was in a relationship with a 22-year-old man, Ryan Sisco. They had sent messages to Sisco and threatened to seek legal consequences against him. Her car and phone privileges were revoked after the argument. The night the disturbance occurred, she wrote on her Facebook page, "He's gonna kill her if she doesn't leave soon [...] I want to kill him so fucking bad, take one of his guns and blow his fucking brains out." Police acknowledged that the murder may not have been premeditated, as that morning she had witnessed Ayers beating her mother.

Martinson then ran to her room. When Thomas banged on her door, afterwards, she shot and killed her stepfather with a shotgun. Her mother Jennifer Ayers came to investigate the gunshots. During this confrontation, Martinson killed her mother with a knife. After the killings, Martinson had locked her younger siblings in a closet with a supply of food. One of the children had seen Thomas' body and doubted Martinson's denial that she had killed him.

When first interviewed, Martinson claimed it was not her, but her mother, who had killed Thomas Ayers and she was attacked upon finding her mother standing over the corpse of her stepfather and killed her mother in self-defense. Her younger sibling's statements to police disputed these claims. Martinson later said she had taken the gun to commit suicide, but was interrupted by Thomas Ayers.

Martinson claimed she had taken one of Ayers' guns to her room after the argument with the intention of killing herself. He began knocking on her door and she feared the consequences of him finding her with it. She then made the decision to kill him, as she felt he "deserved to die more," and began firing, striking him in the neck. She then shot him in the head, killing him.

Police were called to the scene on March 8 by the oldest stepsister of Martinson and they immediately suspected Martinson was responsible, due to the fact that she had fled the scene. After police announced the details of the crime and their vehicle information, she and Sisco were captured in Boone County, Indiana. It is believed the pair were actually planning to meet relatives of Sisco in Tennessee. Sisco was never considered a suspect in the case, but was charged for a parole violation.

Martinson "fought" extradition from Indiana to Wisconsin, but was eventually brought back to the state.

== Trial and conviction ==
Martinson was charged as an adult, with two accounts of first-degree intentional homicide and false imprisonment. She later pleaded not guilty by reason of insanity. She later accepted a plea deal of second-degree murder in March 2016 and was sentenced to twenty-three years in prison along with seventeen years of supervision in June. The prosecutors pursued a forty-year sentence, where her defense argued for eight, citing her mother's negligence of subjecting the family to the abuse of Thomas Ayers. Judge Michael Bloom stated he felt Martinson's history was not enough to justify murder and her life was not in danger at the time.

Martinson is detained at Taycheedah Correctional Institution, located in Fond du Lac, Wisconsin. Since her imprisonment, she states she feels "happy" and "safe." She also received her high school diploma.

In June 2017, Martinson argued for a reduced sentence with the aid of her lawyer, who cited the defendant was incapable of making a rational choice due to her living conditions. The motion was denied by judge Michael Bloom in September. In 2019, an appeals court denied her a new trial.
