= Grant, Dunn County, Wisconsin =

Grant, Wisconsin
- Town
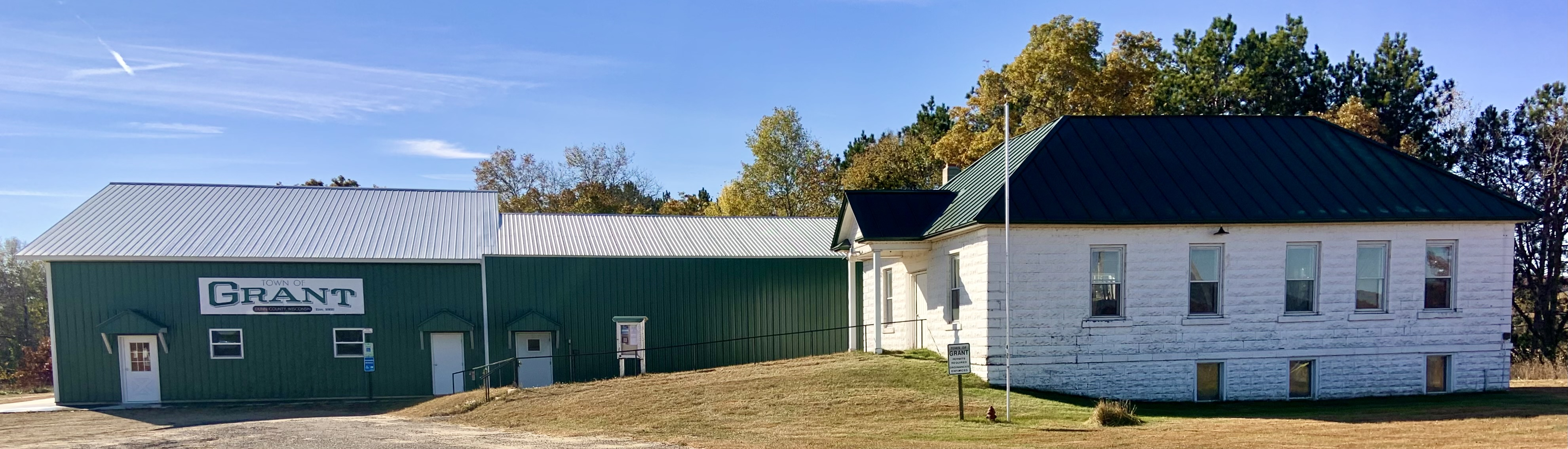
- Town hall

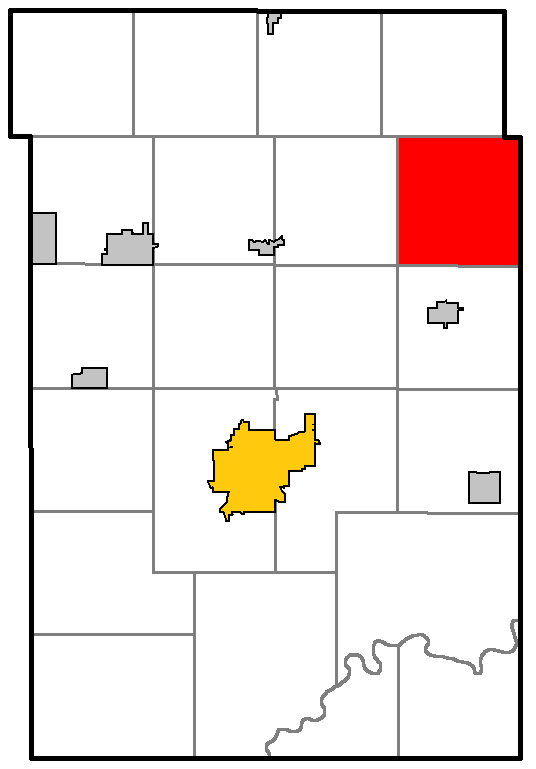
- Location of Grant, within Dunn County

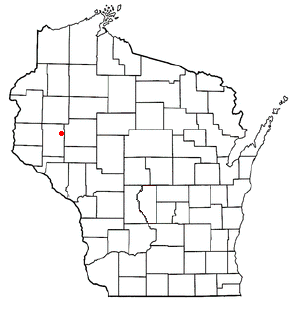
- Location of Grant, Wisconsin
- Coordinates: 45°4′31″N 91°42′55″W
- Country: United States
- State: Wisconsin
- County: Dunn

Area
  - Total: 37.3 sq mi (96.7 km^{2})
  - Land: 36.9 sq mi (95.5 km^{2})
  - Water: 0.50 sq mi (1.3 km^{2})
- Elevation: 965 ft (294 m)

Population (2020)
  - Total: 395
  - Density: 10.7/sq mi (4.14/km^{2})
- Time zone: UTC-6 (Central (CST))
  - Summer (DST): UTC-5 (CDT)
- Area codes: 715 & 534
- FIPS code: 55-30300
- GNIS feature ID: 1583299
- Website: https://townofgrant-dunn.com/

Grant is a town in Dunn County, Wisconsin, United States. The population was 395 at the 2020 census.

== Geography ==
According to the United States Census Bureau, the town has a total area of 37.3 square miles (96.7 km^{2}), of which 36.9 square miles (95.5 km^{2}) is land and 0.5 square mile (1.2 km^{2}) (1.29%) is water.

== Demographics ==
Historical population
Census	Pop.	Note	%±
1990	412		—
2000	426		3.4%
2010	385		−9.6%
2020	395		2.6%

As of the census of 2000, there were 426 people, 147 households, and 115 families residing in the town. The population density was 11.6 people per square mile (4.5/km^{2}). There were 160 housing units at an average density of 4.3 per square mile (1.7/km^{2}). The racial makeup of the town was 99.53% White, and 0.47% from two or more races. Hispanic or Latino of any race were 0.23% of the population.

There were 147 households, out of which 36.7% had children under the age of 18 living with them, 72.1% were married couples living together, 3.4% had a female householder with no husband present, and 21.1% were non-families. 17.0% of all households were made up of individuals, and 5.4% had someone living alone who was 65 years of age or older. The average household size was 2.90 and the average family size was 3.27.

In the town, the population was spread out, with 28.2% under the age of 18, 7.7% from 18 to 24, 27.2% from 25 to 44, 28.4% from 45 to 64, and 8.5% who were 65 years of age or older. The median age was 38 years. For every 100 females, there were 113.0 males. For every 100 females age 18 and over, there were 115.5 males.

The median income for a household in the town was $38,409, and the median income for a family was $41,250. Males had a median income of $26,607 versus $20,714 for females. The per capita income for the town was $15,669. About 4.9% of families and 9.9% of the population were below the poverty line, including 7.6% of those under age 18 and 8.7% of those age 65 or over.
