= Taycheedah Correctional Institution =

Prison in Wisconsin, USA

Coordinates: 43°47′52″N 88°23′08″W

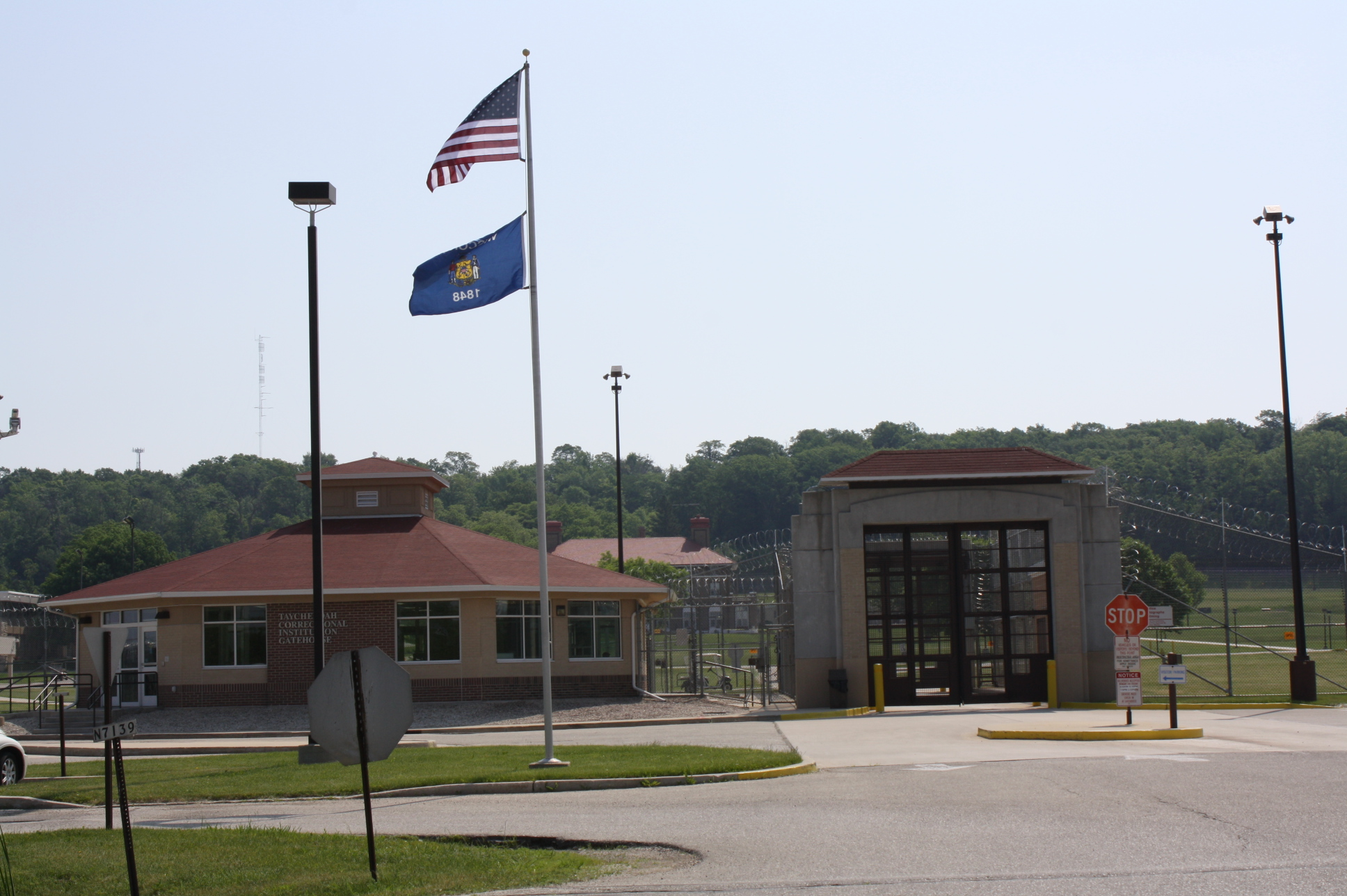
- Entrance
- Interactive map of Taycheedah Correctional Institution
- Location: Fond du Lac, Wisconsin (near Taycheedah, Wisconsin)
- Status: Operational
- Security class: Maximum/Medium
- Capacity: 752 females (operating as of 2019)
- Population: 1,036 females (FY 2026)
- Opened: 1921
- Managed by: Wisconsin Department of Corrections; Division of Adult Institutions
- Warden: Michael Gierach

Taycheedah Correctional Institution is a prison in Fond du Lac, Wisconsin, near the Town of Taycheedah. Established in 1921, it was known until 1975 as the Wisconsin Home for Women. The facility houses maximum-security and medium-security adult females, with a population of 1,036 as of 2026.

== History ==
Before the Wisconsin Industrial Home was opened in 1921, female inmates were held in the Wisconsin State Prison in Waupun (now known as Waupun Correctional Institution). After it opened, women who committed "crimes against morality" were transferred to the Wisconsin Industrial Home, while women who had committed more serious crimes or were repeat offenders remained at Waupun. In 1931, construction began on a new facility, the Wisconsin Prison for Women, adjoining the Wisconsin Industrial Home. All women were transferred to this new facility. In 1945 Wisconsin Industrial Home and Wisconsin Prison for Women were combined and given the name Wisconsin Home for Women. The prison received its current name, Taycheedah Correctional Institution, in 1975 by order of the legislature.

=== Work ===
Inmates at the Wisconsin Prison for Women typically did laundry, sewing, gardening, kitchen and farm work. Beginning in 1943, they put their sewing skills to work by making dresses for the Russian War Relief. In 1952, the farm program was discontinued. During the 1980s, inmates worked taking phone calls for the Department of Transportation and the Lottery Board. The year 1997 marked the beginning of the Computer Recycling program, which involved the rebuilding, selling, or donation of used computers. This program is still in existence and is run at six different sites, employing nearly 100 inmates.

=== Today ===
In 1995, a new housing unit opened, doubling inmate capacity. Two years later, a barracks unit for 150 inmates was added. By 2002, two more buildings had been opened. The first contained a mental health unit with 64 beds and a segregation unit with 68 beds. The second, a general population facility, and had the largest capacity, with 240 beds. The Taycheedah Correctional Institution became part of the Wisconsin Women's Correctional System in August 2005, putting Warden Boatwright in control of all female institutions and centers.

== Programs ==
Taycheedah provides its inmates with several social services, including anger management training, Alcoholics/Narcotics Anonymous, and a pre-release program. The pre-release program helps inmates produce résumés, develop interviewing skills, and learn to use community resources before they are released from the institution.

Taycheedah provides inmates with religious services and programs. Worship services are held regularly, with average monthly attendance in 2006–2007 at 998. Twenty study groups and programs supplement worship services. More than 500 inmates participated in these programs during 2006–2007. As of June 30, 2007, 80% of the inmate population was Protestant, 15% Catholic, 5% Native American, 4% Wiccan, 4% Islamic, 1% Buddhist, and less than 1% were other or had no preference. The racial breakdown of the population as of June 2007 was White 57%, Black 38%, American Indian 4.5%, and Asian 0.5%.

Taycheedah offers adult education, special education, and English as a second language classes to inmates. Inmates can also earn certificates from the nearby Moraine Park Technical College in one of three programs. Credits can be transferred to the Wisconsin Technical College System for continuing education.

The prison also offers vocational training. Some of these include; dental laboratory technician, construction, office software, and cosmetology. Inmates are provided jobs within the prison, such as kitchen duties, maintenance around the facility, recycling, and laundry.

== Inmate suicide and settlement ==
In 2005, Angela Enoch, an 18-year-old inmate at Taycheedah, killed herself by using pieces of her pillow to strangle herself, after several days of pleading for psychiatric attention. After her death, Enoch's family filed a lawsuit against the correctional institution. In August 2008, the state settled the lawsuit, paying $635,000 to her family. In the settlement, the state did not assume liability for Enoch's death.

== Notable inmates ==
- Diane Borchardt - a teacher who hired students to kill her husband
- Laurie Bembenek - Milwaukee security officer convicted of murder. She escaped from the institution in 1990 and fled to Canada
- Ezra McCandless - an amateur artist convicted of stabbing and murdering her ex-boyfriend in March 2018, in an attempt to win back another ex-boyfriend
- Ashlee Martinson - a woman who, at the age of 17, had murdered her mother and stepfather in retaliation for years of being abused and neglected as a child
- Taylor Schabusiness - married mother convicted of murder after she confessed to the meth-fueled decapitation of her lover while the two were having sex
- Chrystul Kizer - a victim of juvenile sex trafficking convicted of manslaughter in the death of her trafficker

== See also ==
- List of Wisconsin state prisons
