= Sand Creek (community), Wisconsin =

Sand Creek, Wisconsin
- Unincorporated community
- Location within Wisconsin Location within the United States
- Coordinates: 45°10′01″N 91°41′11″W
- Country: United States
- State: Wisconsin
- County: Dunn
- Town: Sand Creek
- Elevation: 988 ft (301 m)
- Time zone: UTC-6 (Central (CST))
  - Summer (DST): UTC-5 (CDT)
- ZIP code: 54765
- Area codes: 715 & 534
- GNIS feature ID: 1573657

Sand Creek is an unincorporated community located in the town of Sand Creek, in Dunn County, Wisconsin, United States. Sand Creek is 6.5 miles (10.5 km) west-southwest of New Auburn. Sand Creek has a post office with ZIP code 54765.

== Business ==
Sand Creek is a small business district that contains a restaurant, Sand Creek Cafe, a Chrysler, Dodge, Jeep and Ram dealership, Gilberts of Sand Creek, and a branch of a local bank. The former Sand Creek School building is located on the north end of the business district and contains a few small businesses and the local U.S. Post Office. At the south end of the business district is the local branch Lakeland Co-Op with a feed mill (the feed mill was torn down by the local Amish in 2012) and gas and convenience store. The main economic drive for Sand Creek is, however, the local farming community.

== Religion ==
Sand Creek is served by two churches, one Lutheran with the other being an independent Bible church.

== Public Services ==
Sand Creek maintains a small library in the former school building which is part of the MORE consortium, giving library users access to over 1.4 million items in the shared catalog. (www.more.lib.wi.us)

The community and surrounding township is protected by a part-time constable and the Dunn County Sheriff's Department.

The Sand Creek Fire Department provides fire and EMS protection to the community and surrounding township. They also serve parts of Sioux Creek township, immediately north in Barron County.

Residents are also served by a municipal sewer system; however, water is supplied by private wells.

Sand Creek maintains three park areas. The riverside park has a park shelter, band stage, playground equipment, and a boat landing for the Red Cedar River. The second park is along Sand Creek and has sports courts and playground equipment. The third park, Myron Park, is a campground north of the business district along County Road I. It contains a number of camp sites and restroom and bath facilities and is situated along the banks of the Red Cedar River. Campers often use the Red Cedar River to float during the summer months ending their trip down river in the business district of Sand Creek about a two-hour float.
