= Menomonie (town), Wisconsin =

Menomonie, Wisconsin
- Town
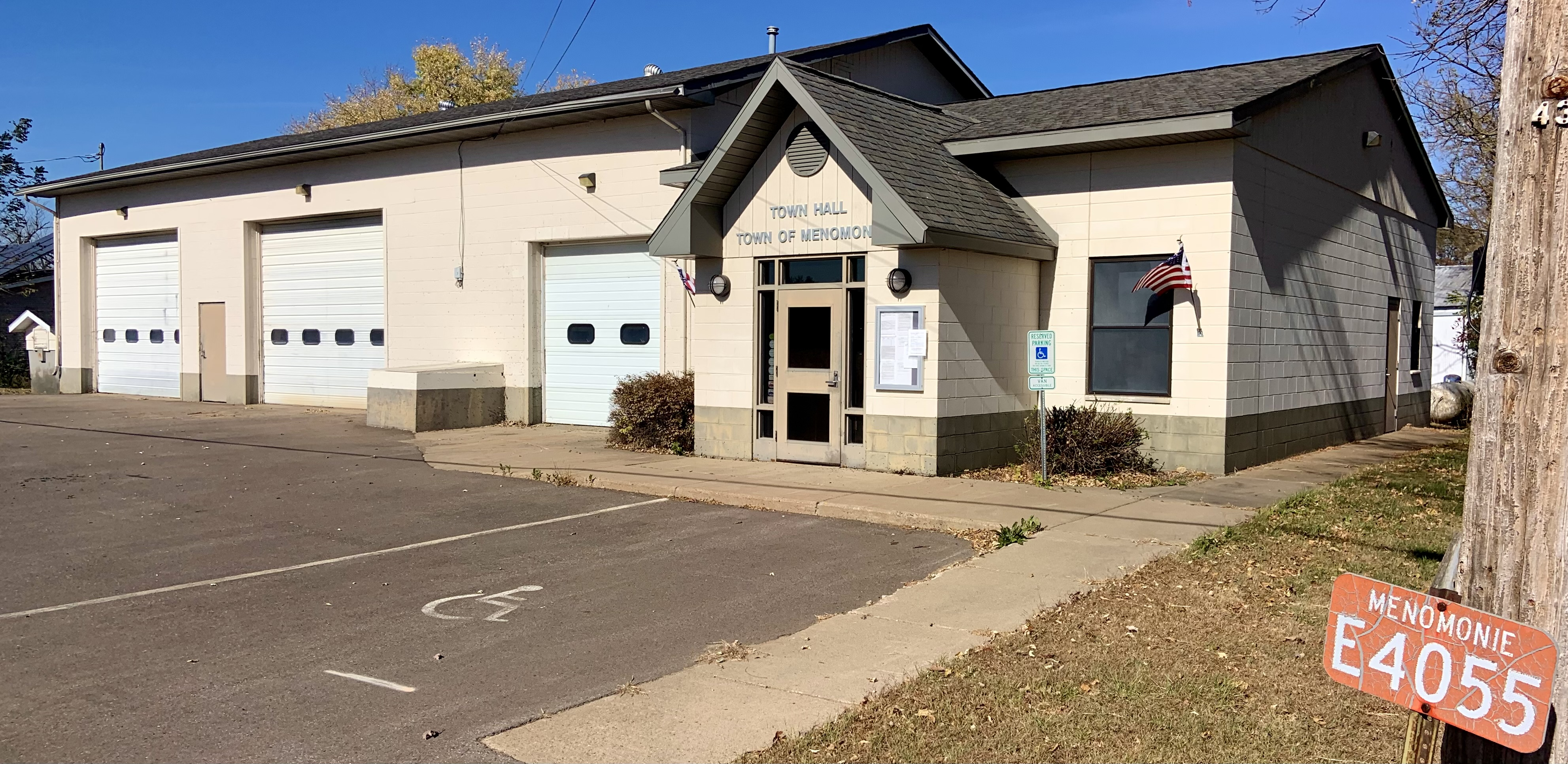
- Town hall

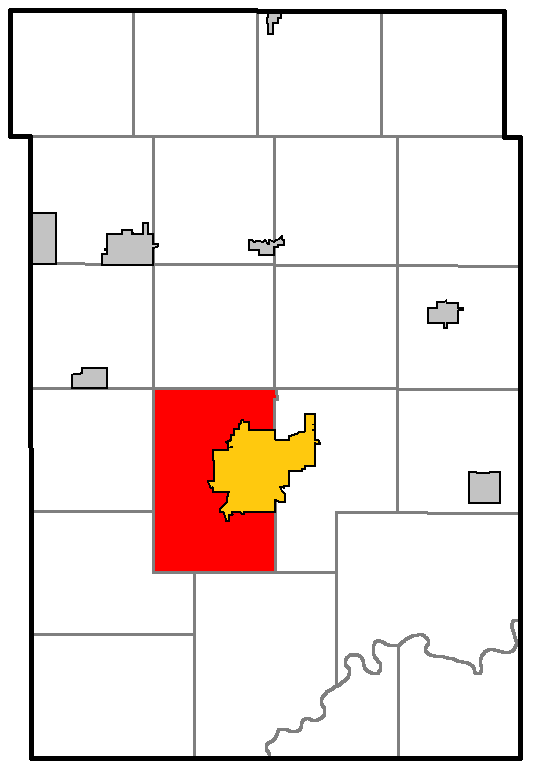
- Location of Menomonie, within Dunn County

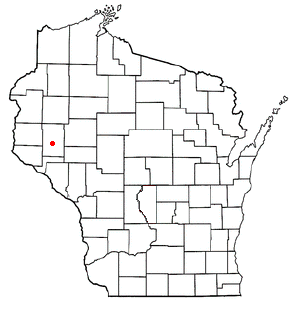
- Location of Menomonie, Wisconsin
- Coordinates: 44°52′53″N 91°57′38″W
- Country: United States
- State: Wisconsin
- County: Dunn

Area
  - Total: 42.0 sq mi (108.8 km^{2})
  - Land: 41.8 sq mi (108.3 km^{2})
  - Water: 0.19 sq mi (0.5 km^{2})
- Elevation: 860 ft (262 m)

Population (2020)
  - Total: 3,415
  - Density: 81.67/sq mi (31.53/km^{2})
- Time zone: UTC-6 (Central (CST))
  - Summer (DST): UTC-5 (CDT)
- Area codes: 715 & 534
- FIPS code: 55-51050
- GNIS feature ID: 1583697
- Website: http://www.townofmenomonie.com

Menomonie is a town in Dunn County, Wisconsin, United States. The population was 3,415 at the 2020 census. The unincorporated community of Irvington lies within the town, as does most of the City of Menomonie.

== Geography ==
According to the United States Census Bureau, the town has a total area of 42.0 square miles (108.8 km^{2}), of which 41.8 square miles (108.3 km^{2}) is land and 0.2 square mile (0.5 km^{2}) (0.50%) is water.

== Demographics ==
Historical population
Census	Pop.	Note	%±
1990	2,732		—
2000	3,174		16.2%
2010	3,366		6.0%
2020	3,415		1.5%

As of the census of 2000, there were 3,174 people, 1,129 households, and 871 families residing in the town. The population density was 75.9 people per square mile (29.3/km^{2}). There were 1,166 housing units at an average density of 27.9 per square mile (10.8/km^{2}). The racial makeup of the town was 92.25% White, 0.09% Black or African American, 0.13% Native American, 6.81% Asian, 0.19% from other races, and 0.54% from two or more races. 0.54% of the population were Hispanic or Latino of any race.

There were 1,129 households, out of which 37.5% had children under the age of 18 living with them, 67.1% were married couples living together, 6.6% had a female householder with no husband present, and 22.8% were non-families. 17.1% of all households were made up of individuals, and 5.8% had someone living alone who was 65 years of age or older. The average household size was 2.81 and the average family size was 3.18.

In the town, the population was spread out, with 30.5% under the age of 18, 6.7% from 18 to 24, 27.8% from 25 to 44, 25.9% from 45 to 64, and 9.1% who were 65 years of age or older. The median age was 36 years. For every 100 females, there were 99.2 males. For every 100 females age 18 and over, there were 101.6 males.

The median income for a household in the town was $43,547, and the median income for a family was $52,931. Males had a median income of $35,240 versus $23,950 for females. The per capita income for the town was $20,814. About 4.7% of families and 8.1% of the population were below the poverty line, including 16.1% of those under age 18 and 5.4% of those age 65 or over.
