= Sand Creek, Wisconsin =

- Town
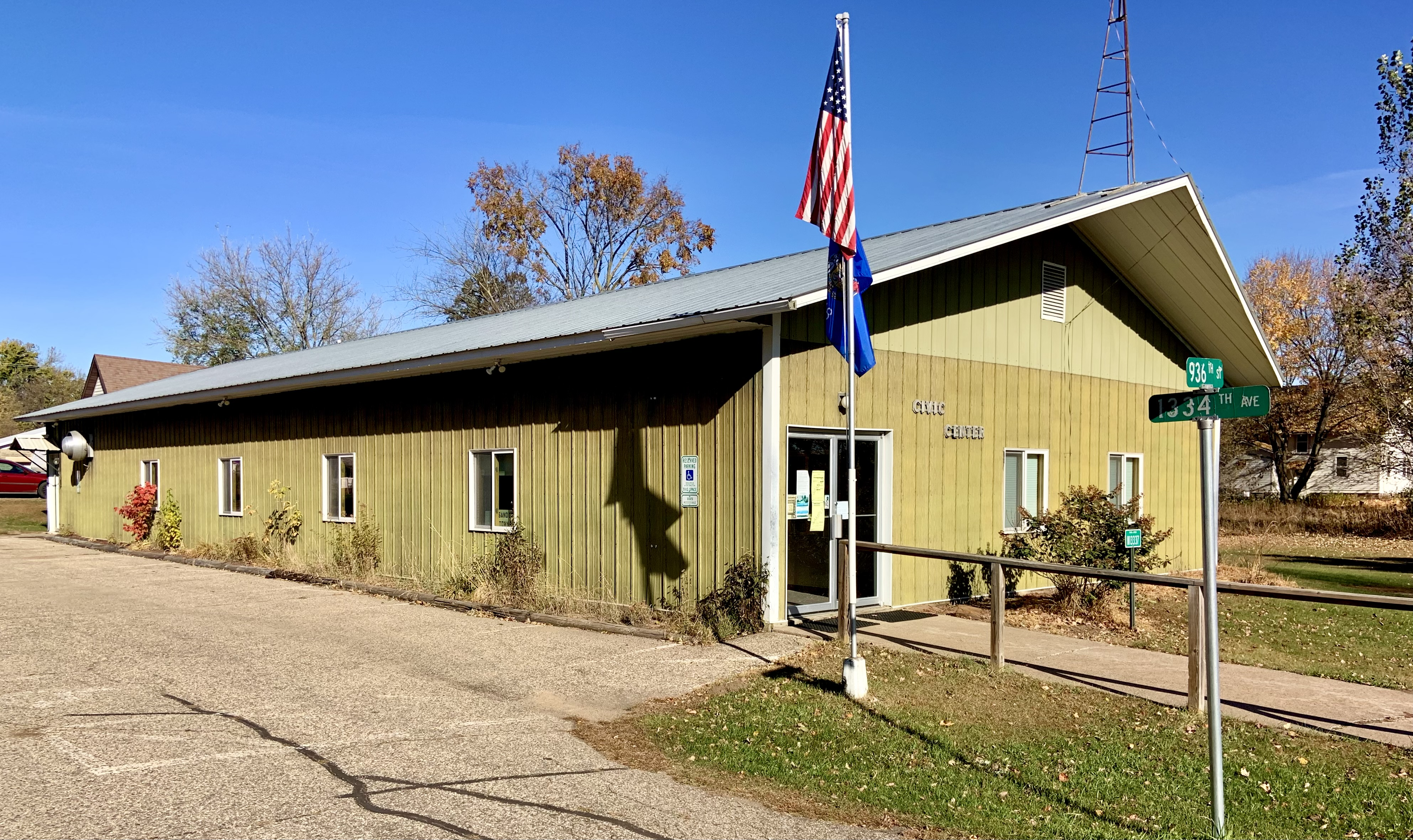
- Town hall

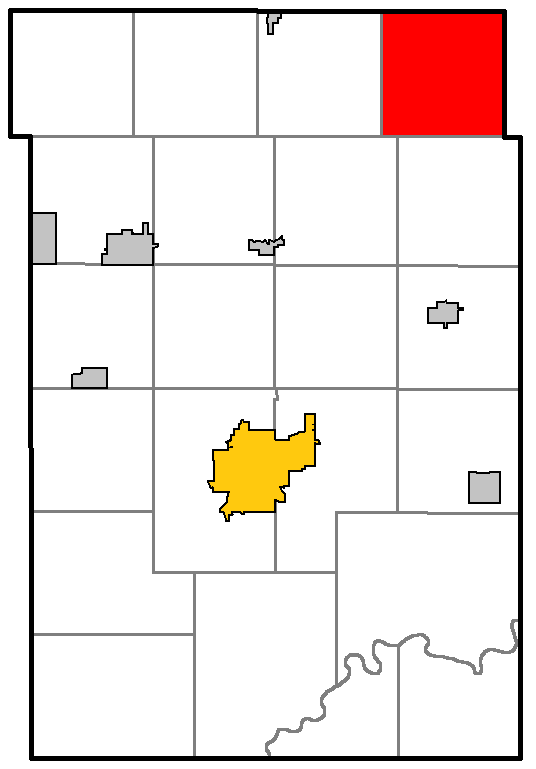
- Location of Sand Creek, within Dunn County

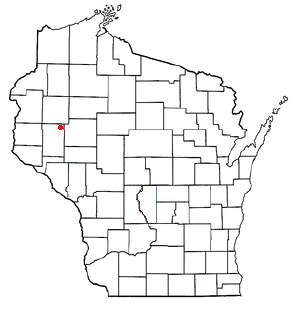
- Location of Sand Creek, Wisconsin
- Coordinates: 45°9′42″N 91°42′44″W
- Country: United States
- State: Wisconsin
- County: Dunn

Area
  - Total: 36.1 sq mi (93.6 km^{2})
  - Land: 35.8 sq mi (92.6 km^{2})
  - Water: 0.39 sq mi (1.0 km^{2})
- Elevation: 1,020 ft (311 m)

Population (2020)
  - Total: 603
  - Density: 16.9/sq mi (6.51/km^{2})
- Time zone: UTC-6 (Central (CST))
  - Summer (DST): UTC-5 (CDT)
- Area codes: 715 & 534
- FIPS code: 55-71425
- GNIS feature ID: 1584097

Sand Creek is a town in Dunn County, Wisconsin, United States. The population was 603 at the 2020 census. The unincorporated community of Sand Creek lies within the town, on the Red Cedar River.

== Geography ==
According to the United States Census Bureau, the town has a total area of 36.2 square miles (93.6 km^{2}), of which 35.8 square miles (92.6 km^{2}) is land and 0.4 square mile (1.0 km^{2}) (1.11%) is water.

== Demographics ==
Historical population
Census	Pop.	Note	%±
1990	568		—
2000	586		3.2%
2010	570		−2.7%
2020	603		5.8%

As of the census of 2000, there were 586 people, 230 households, and 161 families residing in the town. The population density was 16.4 people per square mile (6.3/km^{2}). There were 244 housing units at an average density of 6.8 per square mile (2.6/km^{2}). The racial makeup of the town was 98.63% White, 0.17% Native American, 0.51% Asian, and 0.68% from two or more races. Hispanic or Latino of any race were 0.17% of the population.

There were 230 households, out of which 28.7% had children under the age of 18 living with them, 63.5% were married couples living together, 4.3% had a female householder with no husband present, and 30.0% were non-families. 24.3% of all households were made up of individuals, and 12.2% had someone living alone who was 65 years of age or older. The average household size was 2.55 and the average family size was 3.08.

In the town, the population was spread out, with 23.7% under the age of 18, 7.2% from 18 to 24, 28.0% from 25 to 44, 26.1% from 45 to 64, and 15.0% who were 65 years of age or older. The median age was 40 years. For every 100 females, there were 107.1 males. For every 100 females age 18 and over, there were 102.3 males.

The median income for a household in the town was $40,197, and the median income for a family was $42,132. Males had a median income of $26,667 versus $20,313 for females. The per capita income for the town was $16,937. About 4.6% of families and 8.2% of the population were below the poverty line, including 16.3% of those under age 18 and 5.9% of those age 65 or over.
