= Rock Creek, Wisconsin =

- Town
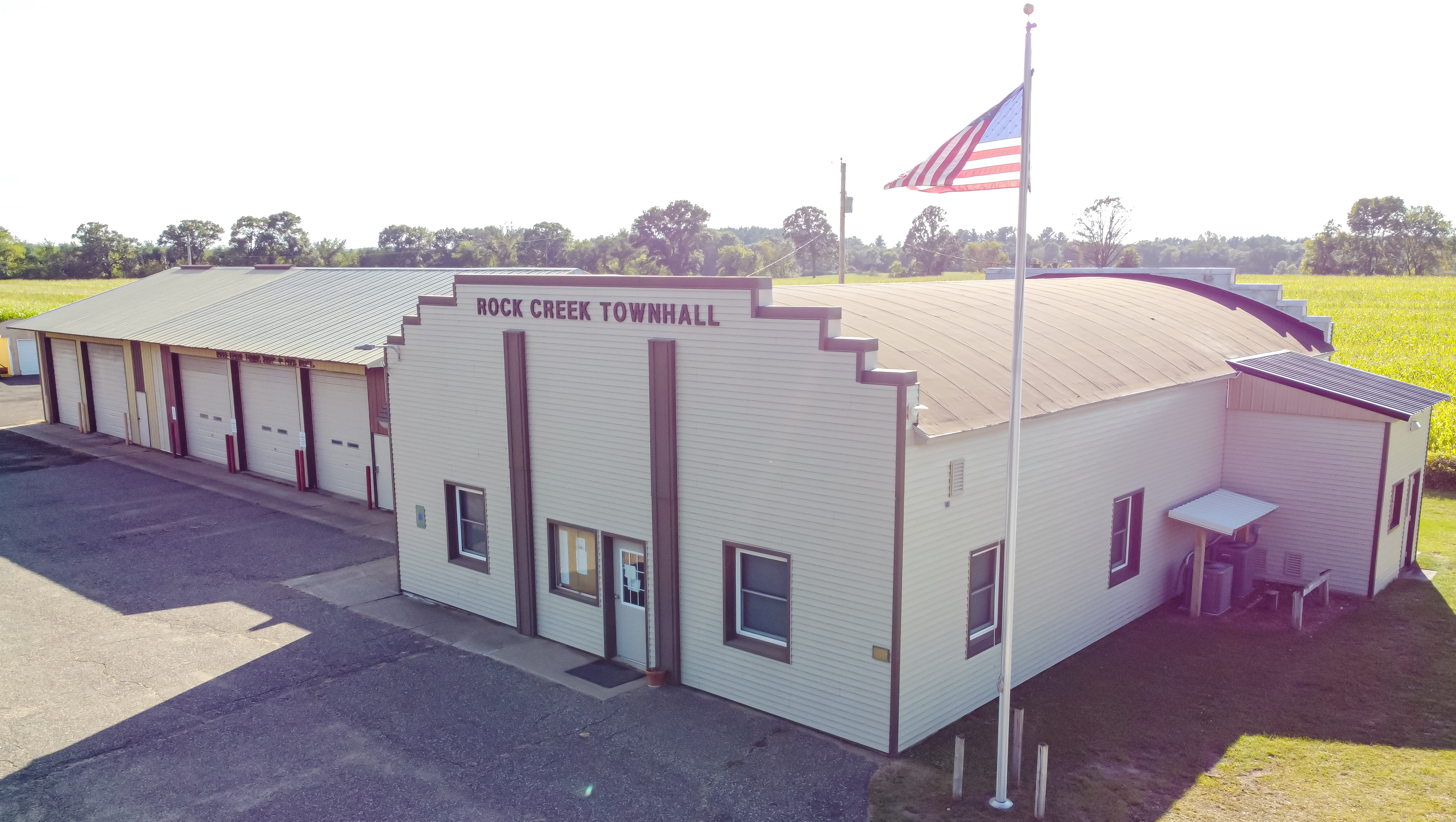
- Town hall in Rock Falls

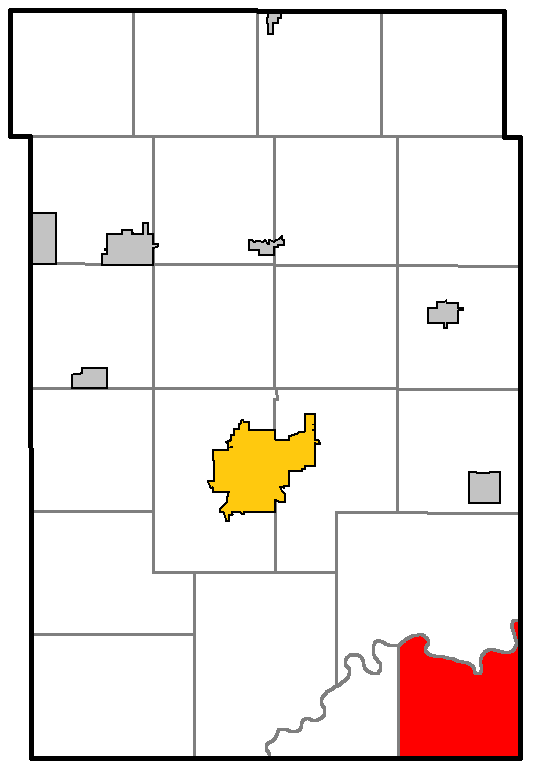
- Location of Rock Creek, within Dunn County

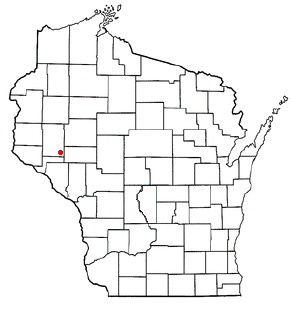
- Location of Rock Creek, Wisconsin
- Coordinates: 44°43′37″N 91°42′13″W
- Country: United States
- State: Wisconsin
- County: Dunn

Area
  - Total: 31.6 sq mi (81.8 km^{2})
  - Land: 30.8 sq mi (79.8 km^{2})
  - Water: 0.77 sq mi (2.0 km^{2})
- Elevation: 938 ft (286 m)

Population (2020)
  - Total: 1,003
  - Density: 32.6/sq mi (12.6/km^{2})
- Time zone: UTC-6 (Central (CST))
  - Summer (DST): UTC-5 (CDT)
- Area codes: 715 & 534
- FIPS code: 55-68700
- GNIS feature ID: 1584051
- Website: https://www.townofrockcreek.org/

Rock Creek is a town in Dunn County, Wisconsin, United States. The population was 1,003 at the 2020 census. The unincorporated communities of Caryville and Rock Falls are located within the town. Located near Eau Claire, the town has seen a great deal of recent suburban development in the corridor between the Chippewa River and Wis. 85.

== Geography ==
According to the United States Census Bureau, the town has a total area of 31.6 square miles (81.8 km^{2}), of which 30.8 square miles (79.8 km^{2}) is land and 0.8 square mile (2.0 km^{2}) (2.47%) is water.

== Demographics ==
Historical population
| Census | Pop. | Note | %± |
|---|---|---|---|
| 1990 | 696 | | — |
| 2000 | 793 | | 13.9% |
| 2010 | 1,000 | | 26.1% |
| 2020 | 1,003 | | 0.3% |

As of the census of 2000, there were 793 people, 286 households, and 223 families residing in the town. The population density was 25.7 people per square mile (9.9/km^{2}). There were 300 housing units at an average density of 9.7 per square mile (3.8/km^{2}). The racial makeup of the town was 96.97% White, 0.13% African American, 1.64% Asian, 0.38% from other races, and 0.88% from two or more races. Hispanic or Latino of any race were 0.38% of the population.

There were 286 households, out of which 35.3% had children under the age of 18 living with them, 66.4% were married couples living together, 6.6% had a female householder with no husband present, and 22.0% were non-families. 19.6% of all households were made up of individuals, and 8.4% had someone living alone who was 65 years of age or older. The average household size was 2.77 and the average family size was 3.15.

In the town, the population was spread out, with 26.6% under the age of 18, 7.7% from 18 to 24, 30.5% from 25 to 44, 25.5% from 45 to 64, and 9.7% who were 65 years of age or older. The median age was 35 years. For every 100 females, there were 101.8 males. For every 100 females age 18 and over, there were 107.9 males.

The median income for a household in the town was $43,906, and the median income for a family was $46,354. Males had a median income of $30,536 versus $20,815 for females. The per capita income for the town was $16,735. About 5.5% of families and 7.7% of the population were below the poverty line, including 12.6% of those under age 18 and 6.3% of those age 65 or over.
