= Weston, Dunn County, Wisconsin =

Weston, Wisconsin
- Town
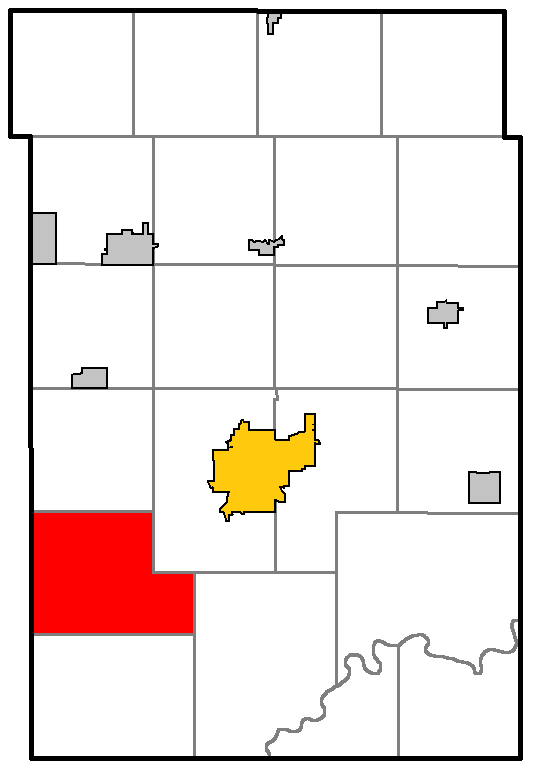
- Location of Weston, within Dunn County

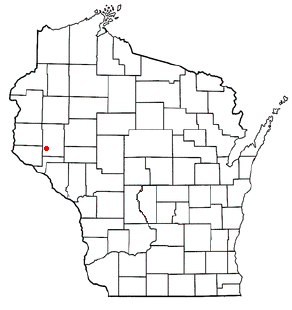
- Location of Weston, Wisconsin
- Coordinates: 44°48′30″N 92°3′37″W
- Country: United States
- State: Wisconsin
- County: Dunn

Area
  - Total: 41.5 sq mi (107.5 km^{2})
  - Land: 41.5 sq mi (107.5 km^{2})
  - Water: 0 sq mi (0.0 km^{2})
- Elevation: 846 ft (258 m)

Population (2020)
  - Total: 574
  - Density: 13.8/sq mi (5.34/km^{2})
- Time zone: UTC-6 (Central (CST))
  - Summer (DST): UTC-5 (CDT)
- Area codes: 715 & 534
- FIPS code: 55-85975
- GNIS feature ID: 1584412
- Website: https://www.townofweston-wi.com/

Weston is a town in Dunn County, Wisconsin, United States. The population was 574 at the 2020 census. The unincorporated communities of Comfort and Weston are located in the town. The unincorporated community of Hatchville is also located partially in the town.

== Geography ==
According to the United States Census Bureau, the town has a total area of 41.5 square miles (107.5 km^{2}), all land.

== Demographics ==
Historical population
Census	Pop.	Note	%±
1990	560		—
2000	630		12.5%
2010	594		−5.7%
2020	574		−3.4%

As of the census of 2000, there were 630 people, 221 households, and 169 families residing in the town. The population density was 15.2 people per square mile (5.9/km^{2}). There were 233 housing units at an average density of 5.6 per square mile (2.2/km^{2}). The racial makeup of the town was 96.98% White, 2.38% Asian, 0.32% from other races, and 0.32% from two or more races. Hispanic or Latino of any race were 1.75% of the population.

There were 221 households, out of which 36.7% had children under the age of 18 living with them, 67.9% were married couples living together, 4.5% had a female householder with no husband present, and 23.1% were non-families. 18.1% of all households were made up of individuals, and 6.3% had someone living alone who was 65 years of age or older. The average household size was 2.85 and the average family size was 3.26.

In the town, the population was spread out, with 30.5% under the age of 18, 4.8% from 18 to 24, 31.4% from 25 to 44, 22.7% from 45 to 64, and 10.6% who were 65 years of age or older. The median age was 34 years. For every 100 females, there were 103.9 males. For every 100 females age 18 and over, there were 107.6 males.

The median income for a household in the town was $46,042, and the median income for a family was $47,375. Males had a median income of $32,727 versus $21,645 for females. The per capita income for the town was $16,125. About 6.4% of families and 9.8% of the population were below the poverty line, including 14.7% of those under age 18 and none of those age 65 or over.
