= Spring Brook, Wisconsin =

Spring Brook
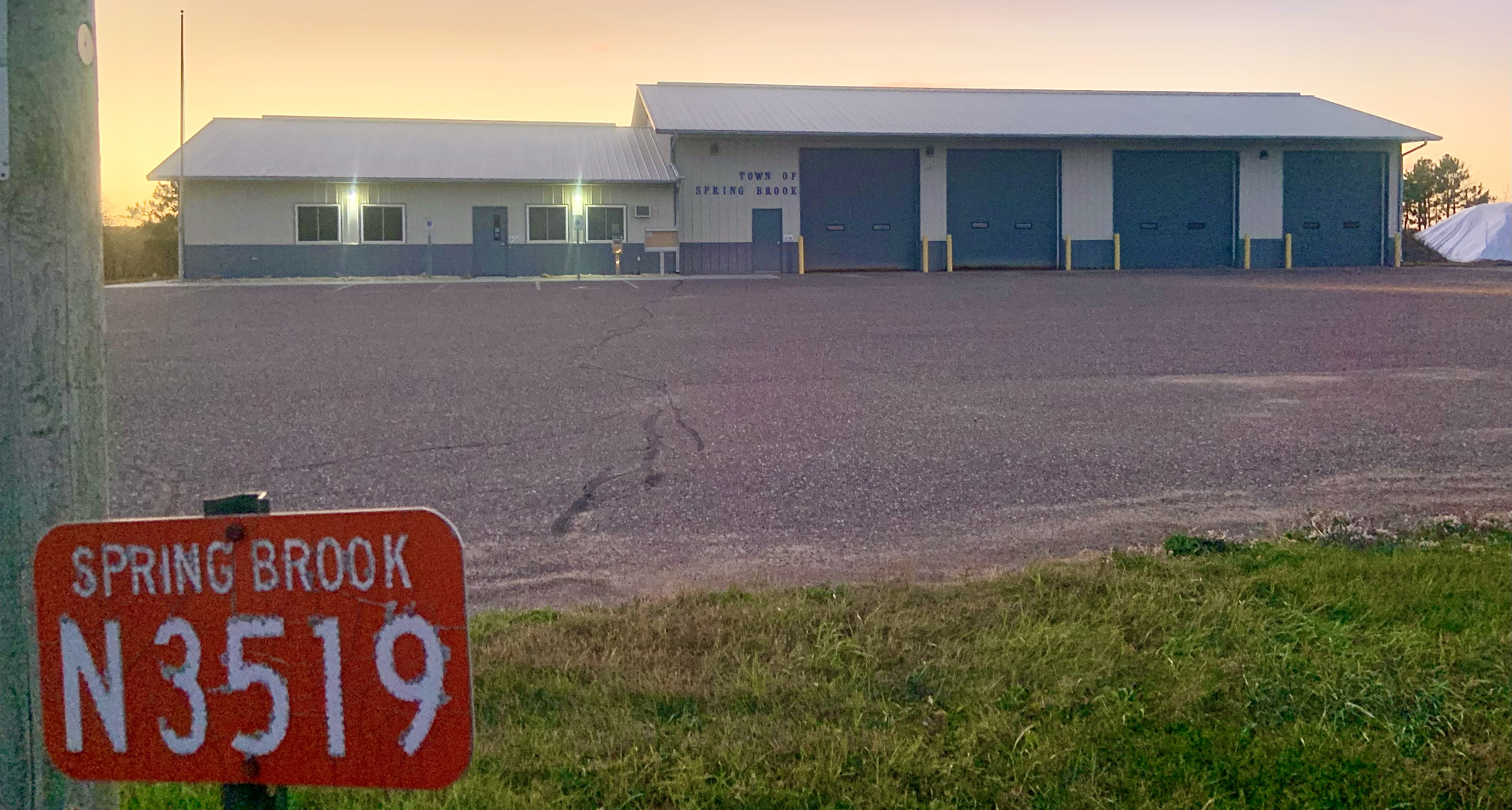
- Town hall

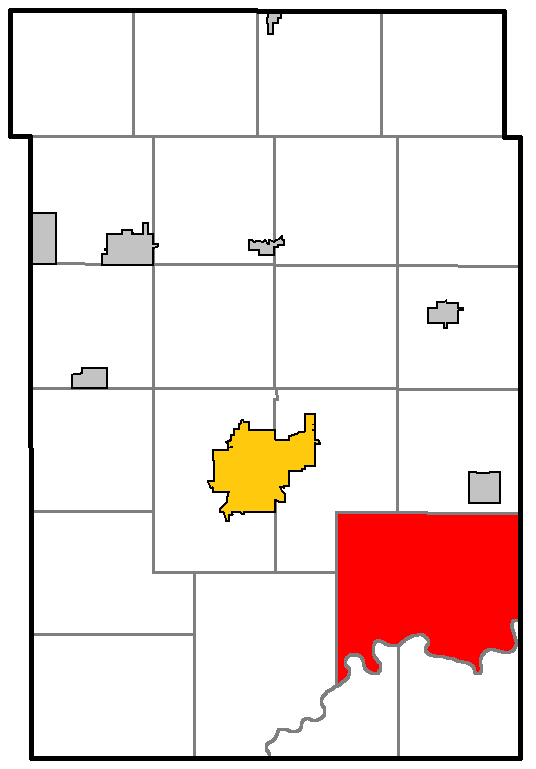
- Location of Spring Brook, within Dunn County

- Location within Wisconsin Location within the United States
- Coordinates: 44°48′24″N 91°44′35″W
- Country: United States
- State: Wisconsin
- County: Dunn

Area
  - Total: 62.1 sq mi (160.9 km^{2})

Population (2020)
  - Total: 1,688
  - Density: 27.17/sq mi (10.49/km^{2})
- Time zone: UTC−6 (CST)
  - Summer (DST): UTC−5 (CDT)
- Website: https://www.spring-brook.org/

Spring Brook is a town in Dunn County, Wisconsin, United States. The population was 1,687 at the 2020 census. The unincorporated community of Falls City is located in the town.

== Geography ==
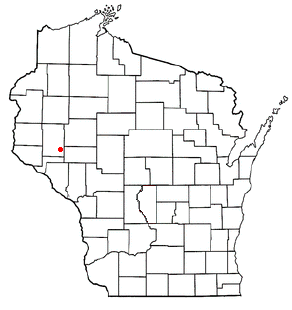
Location of Spring Brook, Wisconsin

According to the United States Census Bureau, the town has a total area of 62.1 square miles (160.9 km^{2}), of which 60.8 square miles (157.4 km^{2}) is land and 1.4 square miles (3.5 km^{2}) (2.17%) is water.

== Demographics ==
Historical population
Census	Pop.	Note	%±
1990	1,293		—
2000	1,320		2.1%
2010	1,558		18.0%
2020	1,687		8.3%

At the 2000 census there were 1,320 people, 468 households, and 375 families in the town. The population density was 21.7 people per square mile (8.4/km^{2}). There were 489 housing units at an average density of 8.0 per square mile (3.1/km^{2}). The racial makeup of the town was 98.94% White, 0.15% Asian, 0.38% from other races, and 0.53% from two or more races. Hispanic or Latino of any race were 0.83%.

Of the 468 households 40.8% had children under the age of 18 living with them, 72.0% were married couples living together, 3.8% had a female householder with no husband present, and 19.7% were non-families. 14.7% of households were one person and 4.3% were one person aged 65 or older. The average household size was 2.82 and the average family size was 3.15.

The age distribution was 28.7% under the age of 18, 6.5% from 18 to 24, 29.9% from 25 to 44, 25.0% from 45 to 64, and 9.8% 65 or older. The median age was 36 years. For every 100 females, there were 110.2 males. For every 100 females age 18 and over, there were 106.4 males.

The median household income was $46,600 and the median family income was $51,250. Males had a median income of $31,607 versus $22,788 for females. The per capita income for the town was $19,936. About 2.3% of families and 3.1% of the population were below the poverty line, including 0.8% of those under age 18 and 4.9% of those age 65 or over.

== Notable Events ==
On March 22, 2018, Ezra McCandless stabbed 24-year-old Alex Woodworth to death near to one of the dairy farms of the town. On February 7, 2020, she was sentenced at nearby Dunn County Judicial Center, to life imprisonment, with the possibility of parol after 50 years.
