= Irvington, Wisconsin =

- Unincorporated community
- Location within Wisconsin Location within the United States
- Coordinates: 44°50′10″N 91°57′17″W
- Country: United States
- State: Wisconsin
- County: Dunn
- Town: Menomonie
- Elevation: 768 ft (234 m)
- Time zone: UTC-6 (Central (CST))
  - Summer (DST): UTC-5 (CDT)
- Area codes: 715 & 534
- GNIS feature ID: 1566989

Irvington is an unincorporated community located in the town of Menomonie, Dunn County, Wisconsin, United States. Irvington is located on the Red Cedar River, 3 miles (4.8 km) south-southwest of the city of Menomonie. Irvington is located on the Red Cedar State Trail and has parking facilities for trail access.
