= Weston (community), Dunn County, Wisconsin =

Weston, Wisconsin
- Unincorporated community
- Location within Wisconsin Location within the United States
- Coordinates: 44°48′45″N 92°04′18″W
- Country: United States
- State: Wisconsin
- County: Dunn
- Town: Weston
- Elevation: 873 ft (266 m)
- Time zone: UTC-6 (Central (CST))
  - Summer (DST): UTC-5 (CDT)
- Area codes: 715 & 534
- GNIS feature ID: 1576583

Weston is an unincorporated community located in the town of Weston, Dunn County, Wisconsin, United States.

Weston was named for an early settler.
