= Comfort, Wisconsin =

- Unincorporated community
- Location within Wisconsin Location within the United States
- Coordinates: 44°46′30″N 92°02′08″W
- Country: United States
- State: Wisconsin
- County: Dunn
- Town: Weston
- Elevation: 823 ft (251 m)
- Time zone: UTC-6 (Central (CST))
  - Summer (DST): UTC-5 (CDT)
- Area codes: 715 & 534
- GNIS feature ID: 1577555

Comfort is an unincorporated community located in the town of Weston, Dunn County, Wisconsin, United States.

The community was named for Comfort Starr.
