= Dunnville, Wisconsin =

- Unincorporated community
- Location within Wisconsin Location within the United States
- Coordinates: 44°43′07″N 91°54′20″W
- Country: United States
- State: Wisconsin
- County: Dunn
- Town: Dunn
- Elevation: 810 ft (250 m)
- Time zone: UTC-6 (Central (CST))
  - Summer (DST): UTC-5 (CDT)
- Area codes: 715 & 534
- GNIS feature ID: 1564188

Dunnville is an unincorporated community located in the town of Dunn, Dunn County, Wisconsin, United States. Dunnville is located along the Red Cedar River 11 miles (18 km) south of Menomonie. Dunnville was the Dunn county seat until an 1857 fire destroyed the courthouse, at which time the county seat was relocated to Menomonie. Dunnville was once "the furthest up-river point to be reached by the river steamers which came up the Chippewa and Red Cedar rivers. Steamer passengers used to come up as far as Dunnville and disembark and take the stage coach for Menomonie and other points not reached by steamer." The remnants of the town, including the historic Tainter Hotel building, were destroyed in a 1928 fire.
