= Hay River, Wisconsin =

- Town
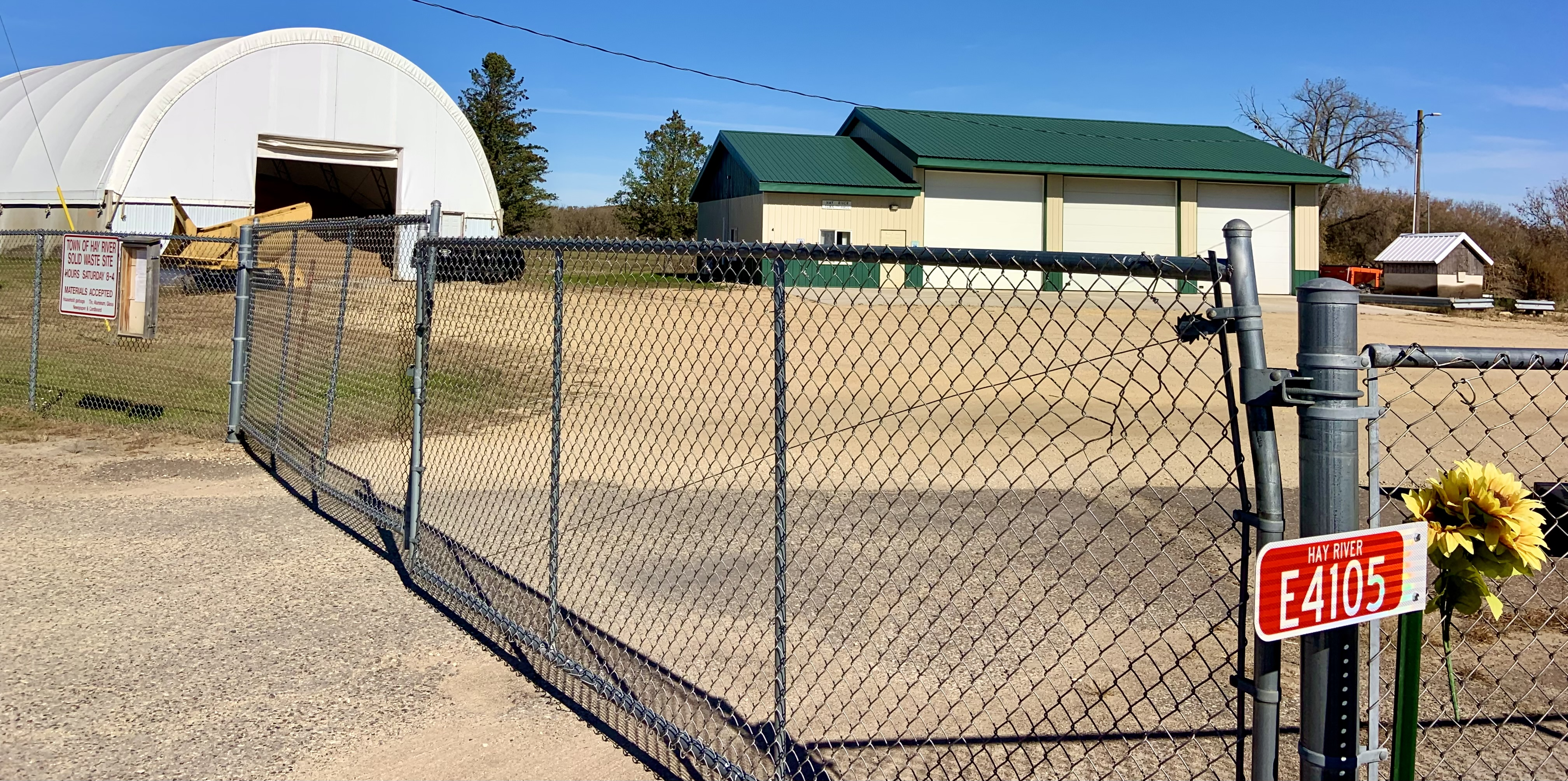
- Town hall

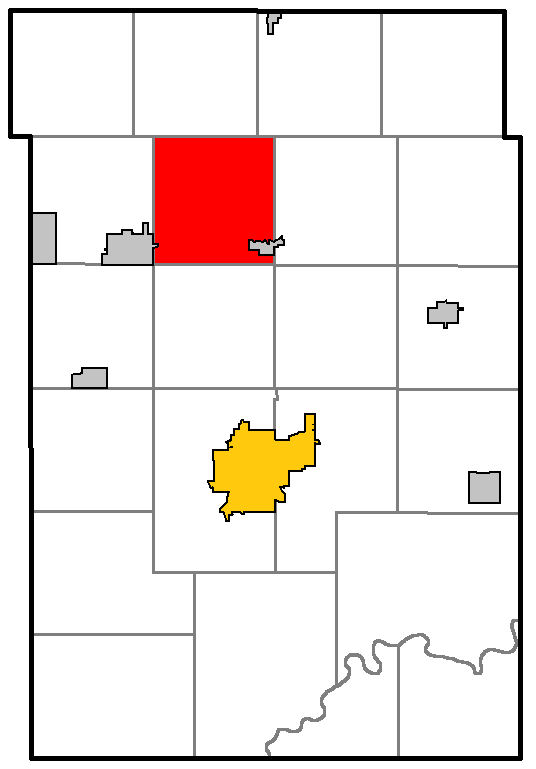
- Location of Hay River, within Dunn County

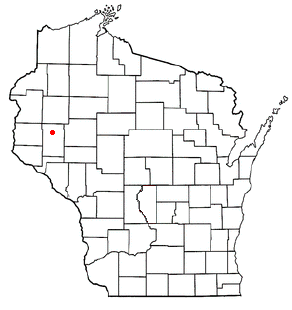
- Location of Hay River, Wisconsin
- Coordinates: 45°4′49″N 91°56′25″W
- Country: United States
- State: Wisconsin
- County: Dunn

Area
  - Total: 36.1 sq mi (93.4 km^{2})
  - Land: 36.1 sq mi (93.4 km^{2})
  - Water: 0 sq mi (0.0 km^{2})
- Elevation: 942 ft (287 m)

Population (2020)
  - Total: 627
  - Density: 17.4/sq mi (6.71/km^{2})
- Time zone: UTC-6 (Central (CST))
  - Summer (DST): UTC-5 (CDT)
- Area codes: 715 & 534
- FIPS code: 55-33400
- GNIS feature ID: 1583369
- Website: https://hayrivertownship.gov/

Hay River is a town in Dunn County, Wisconsin, United States, along the Hay River. The population was 627 at the 2020 census. The unincorporated community of Baxter is located in the town.

== Geography ==
According to the United States Census Bureau, the town has a total area of 36.1 square miles (93.4 km^{2}), all land.

== Demographics ==
Historical population
Census	Pop.	Note	%±
1990	510		—
2000	546		7.1%
2010	558		2.2%
2020	627		12.4%

As of the census of 2000, there were 546 people, 194 households, and 149 families residing in the town. The population density was 15.1 people per square mile (5.8/km^{2}). There were 204 housing units at an average density of 5.7 per square mile (2.2/km^{2}). The racial makeup of the town was 98.17% White, 0.18% Asian, 0.73% from other races, and 0.92% from two or more races. Hispanic or Latino of any race were 0.73% of the population.

There were 194 households, out of which 37.6% had children under the age of 18 living with them, 62.9% were married couples living together, 9.8% had a female householder with no husband present, and 22.7% were non-families. 19.6% of all households were made up of individuals, and 6.2% had someone living alone who was 65 years of age or older. The average household size was 2.81 and the average family size was 3.19.

In the town, the population was spread out, with 29.7% under the age of 18, 7.0% from 18 to 24, 27.5% from 25 to 44, 24.9% from 45 to 64, and 11.0% who were 65 years of age or older. The median age was 36 years. For every 100 females, there were 97.8 males. For every 100 females age 18 and over, there were 107.6 males.

The median income for a household in the town was $41,458, and the median income for a family was $48,750. Males had a median income of $30,795 versus $20,179 for females. The per capita income for the town was $19,272. About 1.2% of families and 6.2% of the population were below the poverty line, including 4.3% of those under age 18 and 5.9% of those age 65 or over.
