= Dunn, Dunn County, Wisconsin =

Dunn, Wisconsin
- Town
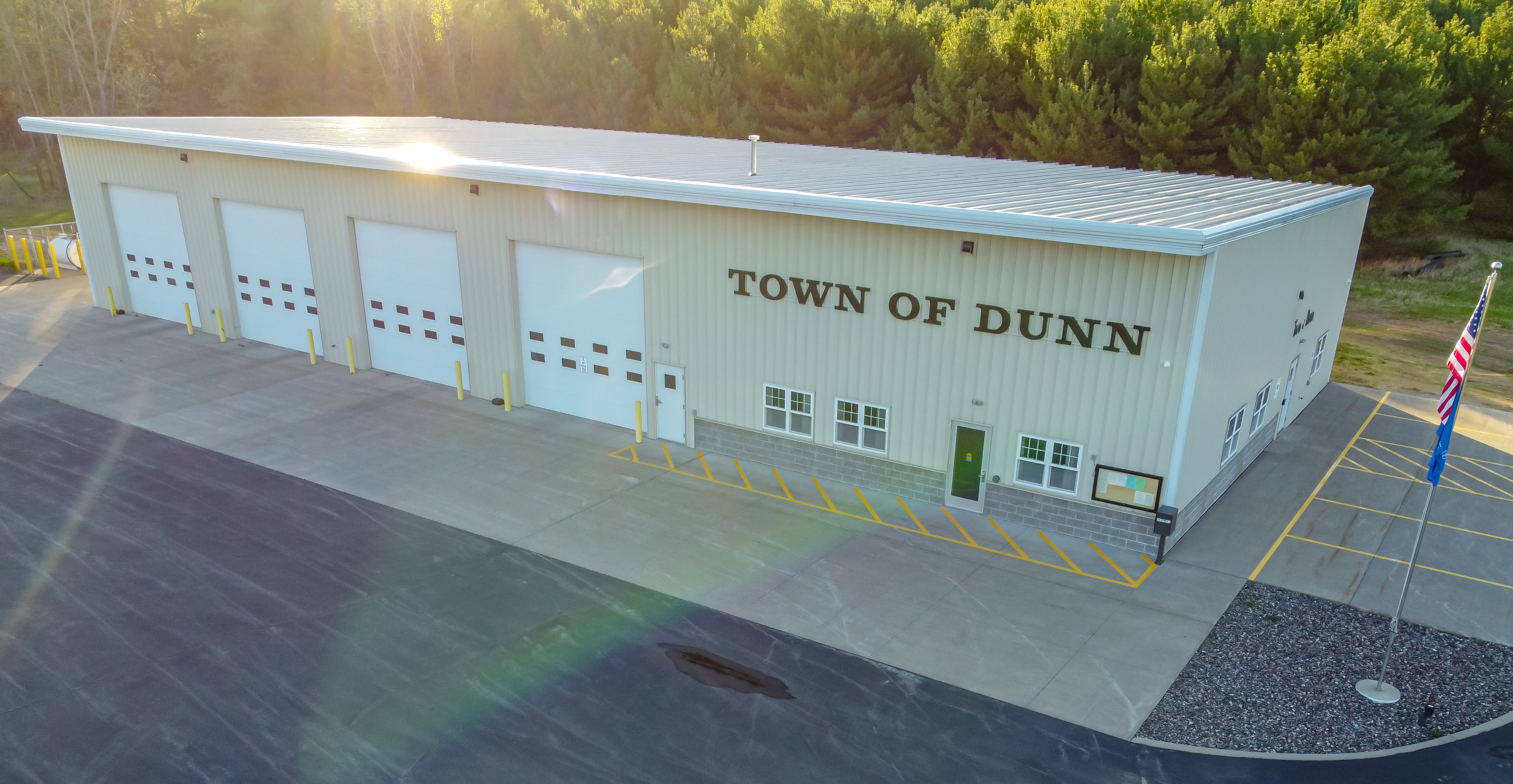
- Dunn Town Hall

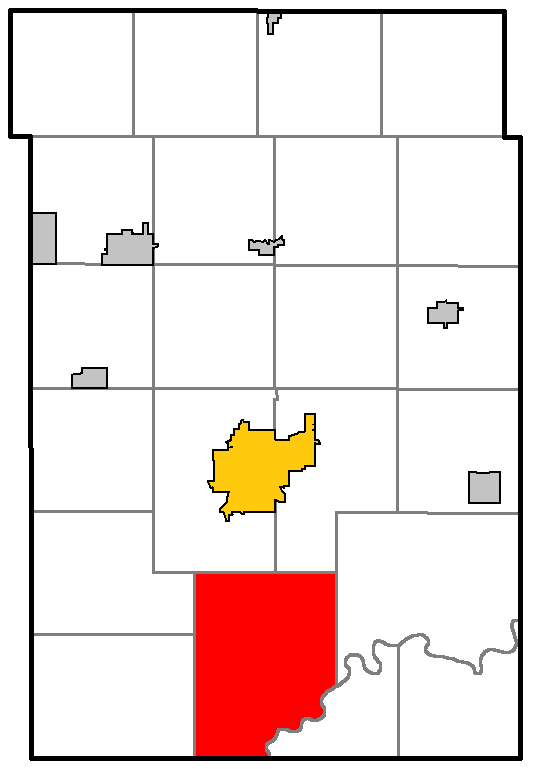
- Location of Dunn, within Dunn County

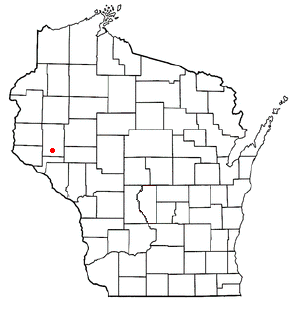
- Location of Dunn, Wisconsin
- Coordinates: 44°44′59″N 91°55′12″W
- Country: United States
- State: Wisconsin
- County: Dunn

Area
  - Total: 57.1 sq mi (147.8 km^{2})
  - Land: 55.7 sq mi (144.3 km^{2})
  - Water: 1.4 sq mi (3.5 km^{2})
- Elevation: 784 ft (239 m)

Population (2020)
  - Total: 1,473
  - Density: 26.44/sq mi (10.21/km^{2})
- Time zone: UTC-6 (Central (CST))
  - Summer (DST): UTC-5 (CDT)
- Area codes: 715 & 534
- FIPS code: 55-21150
- GNIS feature ID: 1583106

Dunn is a town in Dunn County, Wisconsin, United States. The population was 1,473 at the 2020 census. The unincorporated communities of Downsville and Dunnville are located in the town.

== Geography ==
According to the United States Census Bureau, the town has a total area of 57.1 square miles (147.8 km^{2}), of which 55.7 square miles (144.3 km^{2}) is land and 1.4 square miles (3.5 km^{2}) (2.38%) is water.

== Demographics ==
Historical population
Census	Pop.	Note	%±
1990	1,315		—
2000	1,492		13.5%
2010	1,524		2.1%
2020	1,473		−3.3%

As of the census of 2020, there were 1,469 people, 540 households, and 389 families residing in the town. The population density was 26.8 people per square mile (10.3/km^{2}). There were 578 housing units at an average density of 10.4 per square mile (4.0/km^{2}). The racial makeup of the town was 98.12% White, 0.20% African American, 0.20% Native American, 0.94% Asian, 0.07% Pacific Islander, and 0.47% from two or more races. Hispanic or Latino of any race were 0.40% of the population.

There were 540 households, out of which 38.9% had children under the age of 18 living with them, 61.3% were married couples living together, 6.1% had a female householder with no husband present, and 27.8% were non-families. 22.6% of all households were made up of individuals, and 7.6% had someone living alone who was 65 years of age or older. The average household size was 2.72 and the average family size was 3.22.

In the town, the population was spread out, with 29.5% under the age of 18, 8.1% from 18 to 24, 30.2% from 25 to 44, 22.4% from 45 to 64, and 9.8% who were 65 years of age or older. The median age was 35 years. For every 100 females, there were 116.2 males. For every 100 females age 18 and over, there were 111.7 males.

The median income for a household in the town was $45,043, and the median income for a family was $50,114. Males had a median income of $33,250 versus $21,983 for females. The per capita income for the town was $16,429. About 5.7% of families and 10.5% of the population were below the poverty line, including 9.8% of those under age 18 and 14.9% of those age 65 or over.
