= Peru, Wisconsin =

Town of Peru
- Town
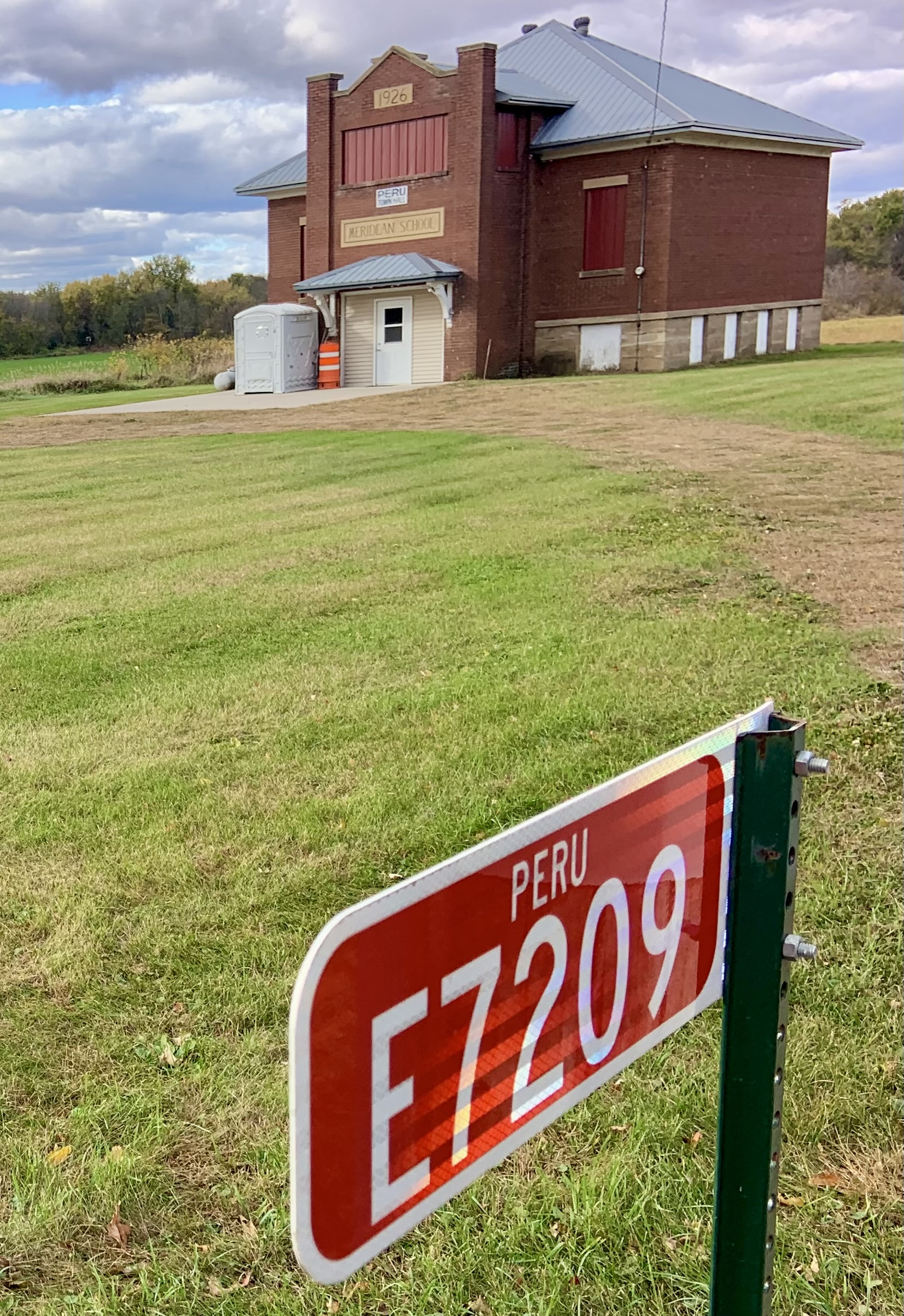
- Town hall

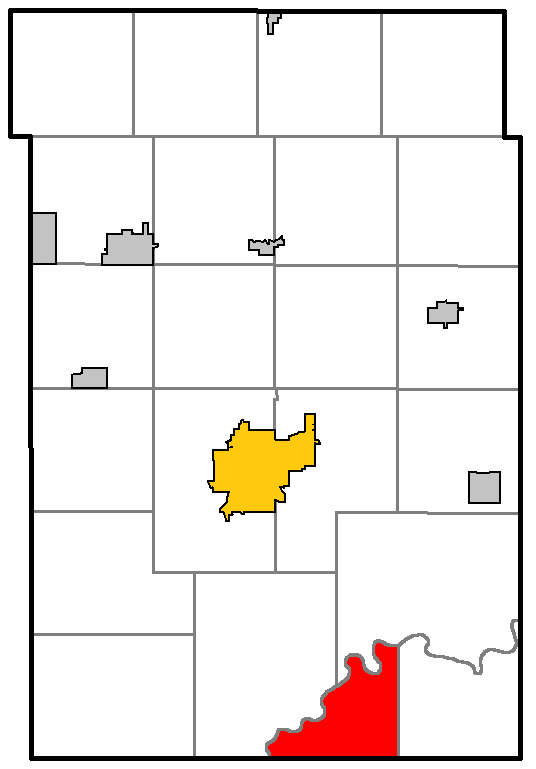
- Location of Peru, within Dunn County

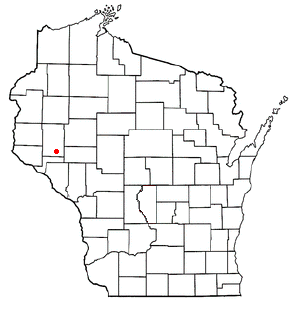
- Location of the Town of Peru
- Coordinates: 44°42′48″N 91°48′55″W
- Country: United States
- State: Wisconsin
- County: Dunn

Area
  - Total: 19.6 sq mi (50.8 km^{2})
  - Land: 18.7 sq mi (48.5 km^{2})
  - Water: 0.89 sq mi (2.3 km^{2})
- Elevation: 860 ft (262 m)

Population (2020)
  - Total: 233
  - Density: 12.4/sq mi (4.80/km^{2})
- Time zone: UTC-6 (Central (CST))
  - Summer (DST): UTC-5 (CDT)
- Area codes: 715 & 534
- FIPS code: 55-62125
- GNIS feature ID: 1583912
- Website: https://townofperu.wordpress.com/

The Town of Peru is a Town located in Dunn County, Wisconsin, United States. The population was 233 at the 2020 census. The unincorporated communities of Meridean and Red Cedar and the ghost towns of Old Tyrone and Old Meridean are located in the town.

== Geography ==
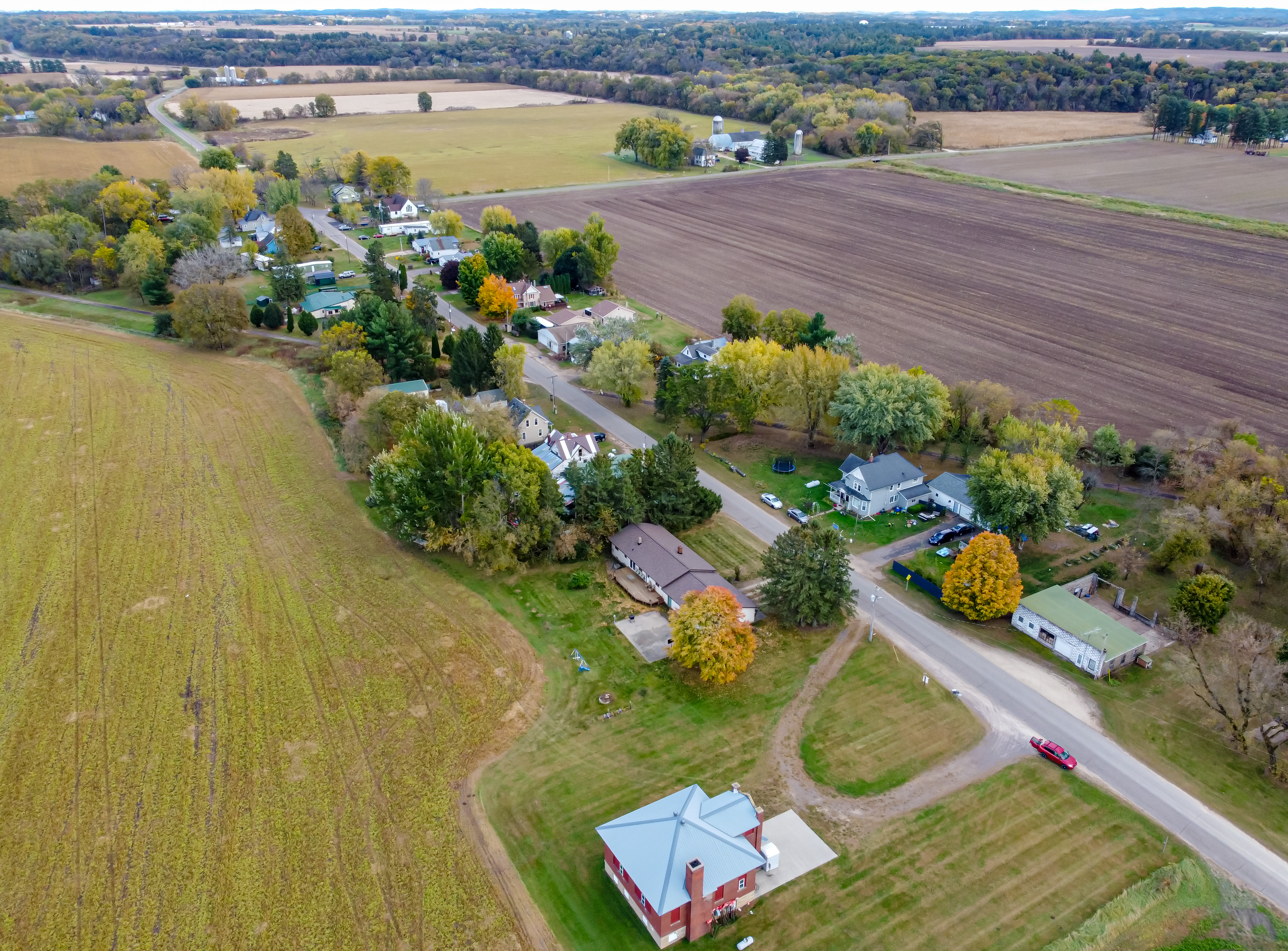

According to the United States Census Bureau, the town has a total area of 19.6 square miles (50.8 km^{2}), of which 18.7 square miles (48.5 km^{2}) is land and 0.9 square mile (2.3 km^{2}) (4.49%) is water.

== Demographics ==
Historical population
Census	Pop.	Note	%±
1990	203		—
2000	247		21.7%
2010	242		−2.0%
2020	233		−3.7%

As of the census of 2000, there were 247 people, 83 households, and 68 families residing in the town. The population density was 13.2 people per square mile (5.1/km^{2}). There were 86 housing units at an average density of 4.6 per square mile (1.8/km^{2}). The racial makeup of the town was 93.52% White, 0.81% Native American, 4.05% Asian, 0.40% from other races, and 1.21% from two or more races.

There were 83 households, out of which 43.4% had children under the age of 18 living with them, 73.5% were married couples living together, 4.8% had a female householder with no husband present, and 16.9% were non-families. 14.5% of all households were made up of individuals, and 6.0% had someone living alone who was 65 years of age or older. The average household size was 2.98 and the average family size was 3.30.

In the town, the population was spread out, with 32.4% under the age of 18, 8.5% from 18 to 24, 25.9% from 25 to 44, 21.5% from 45 to 64, and 11.7% who were 65 years of age or older. The median age was 34 years. For every 100 females, there were 111.1 males. For every 100 females age 18 and over, there were 108.8 males.

The median income for a household in the town was $34,375, and the median income for a family was $50,625. Males had a median income of $29,286 versus $16,875 for females. The per capita income for the town was $14,774. About 8.2% of families and 10.8% of the population were below the poverty line, including 14.1% of those under the age of eighteen and 6.1% of those 65 or over.
