= Wisconsin Highway 85 =

State highway in Wisconsin, United States

State Trunk Highway 85
- WIS 85 highlighted in red

Route information
- Maintained by WisDOT
- Length: 23.48 mi (37.79 km)

Major junctions
- West end: US 10 / WIS 25 in Durand
- East end: WIS 37 southwest of Eau Claire

Location
- Country: United States
- State: Wisconsin
- Counties: Pepin, Dunn, Eau Claire

Highway system
- Wisconsin State Trunk Highway System; Interstate; US; State; Scenic; Rustic
| ← WIS 84 | → WIS 86 |

State Trunk Highway 85 (often called Highway 85, STH-85 or WIS 85) is a 23.48-mile (37.79 km) state highway in Pepin, Dunn, and Eau Claire counties in Wisconsin, United States.

== Route description ==
WIS 85 runs east–west in west central Wisconsin from Durand to just southwest of Eau Claire. About midway along the route, the highway passes through Rock Falls, and three miles (4.8 km) further, Caryville, the only two recognizable settlements between the route's termini. In recent years, the corridor between Rock Falls and Caryville, especially the western side of the highway along the Chippewa River, has seen some suburban development.

== Major intersections ==
| County | Location | mi | km | Destinations | Notes |
|---|---|---|---|---|---|
| Pepin | Durand | 0.0 | 0.0 | US 10 / WIS 25 north – Mondovi, Ellsworth, Menomonie WIS 25 south – Nelson | Roadway continues as southbound WIS 25 |
| Dunn | No major junctions | | | | |
| Eau Claire | Town of Brunswick | 23.48 | 37.79 | WIS 37 – Eau Claire, Mondovi | |
1.000 mi = 1.609 km; 1.000 km = 0.621 mi
