= Downsville, Wisconsin =

Census-designated place in Wisconsin, United States

- Census-designated place
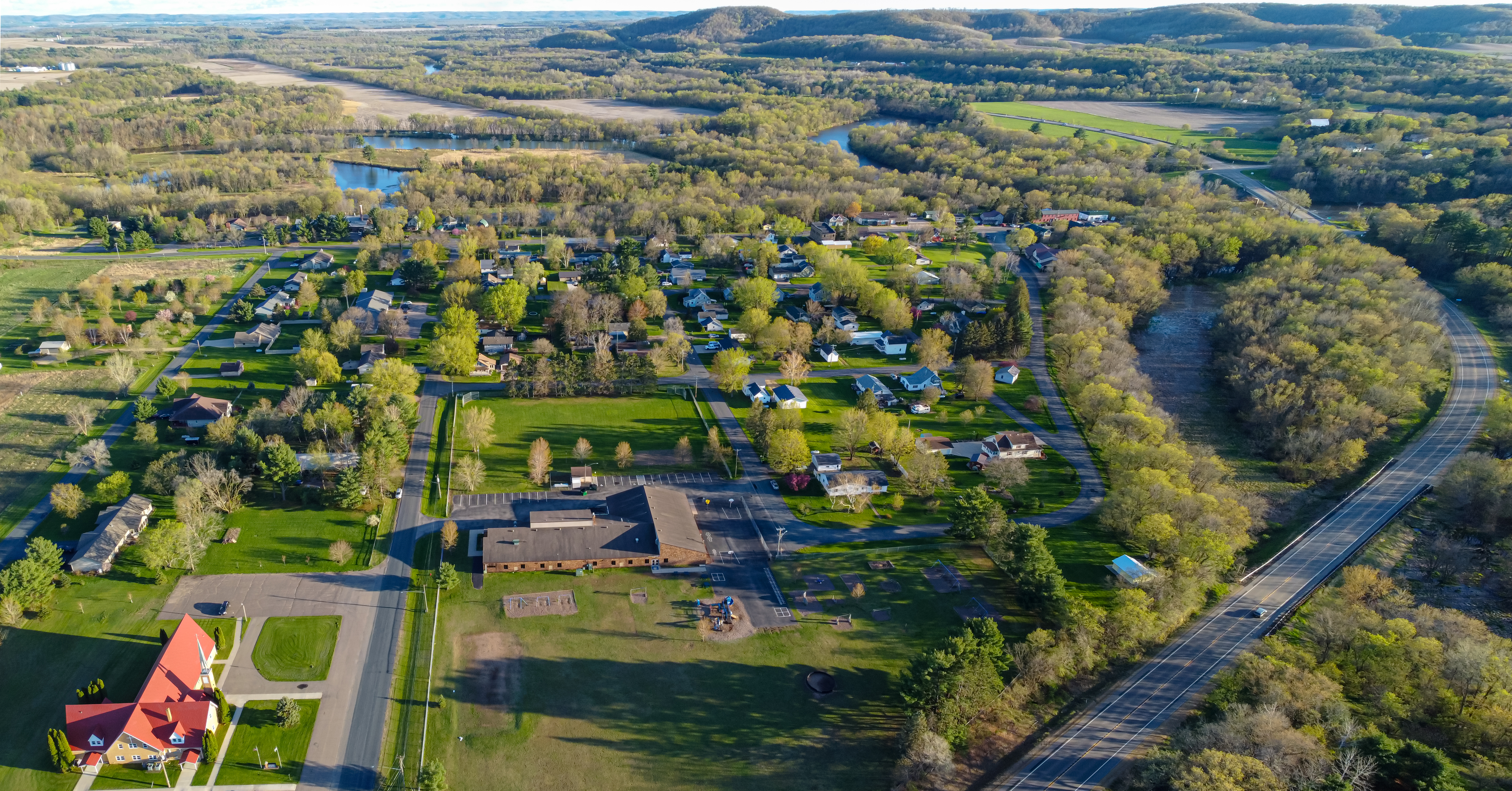
- Wis-25 runs by town

- Location within the state of Wisconsin
- Coordinates: 44°46′29″N 91°55′55″W
- Country: United States
- State: Wisconsin
- County: Dunn
- Town: Dunn

Area
  - Total: 0.805 sq mi (2.08 km^{2})
  - Land: 0.758 sq mi (1.96 km^{2})
  - Water: 0.047 sq mi (0.12 km^{2})

Population (2020)
  - Total: 188
  - Density: 248/sq mi (95.8/km^{2})
- Time zone: UTC-6 (Central (CST))
  - Summer (DST): UTC-5 (CDT)
- Area codes: 715 & 534

Historical population
Census	Pop.	Note	%±
2010	146		—
2020	188		28.8%

Downsville is an unincorporated census-designated place in the town of Dunn, located within Dunn County, Wisconsin, United States, where Highway 25 crosses the Red Cedar River. As of the 2020 census, its population was 188, up from 146 at the 2010 census.

The community was founded in 1855. Around that time, Ebenezer Thompson tried to dam the Red Cedar, but his half-built dam was destroyed by a flood. In 1857 Captain Downs tried again and succeeded in building a dam which powered a sawmill. The village was platted in 1859, and named for Downs. He sold the mill to Knapp, Stout & Co., who expanded it and added planing and shingle mills which employed about 100 men by 1891. By that year the town also had a steam feed mill and a stop on the Menomonie branch of the Chicago, Milwaukee & St Paul Railway.

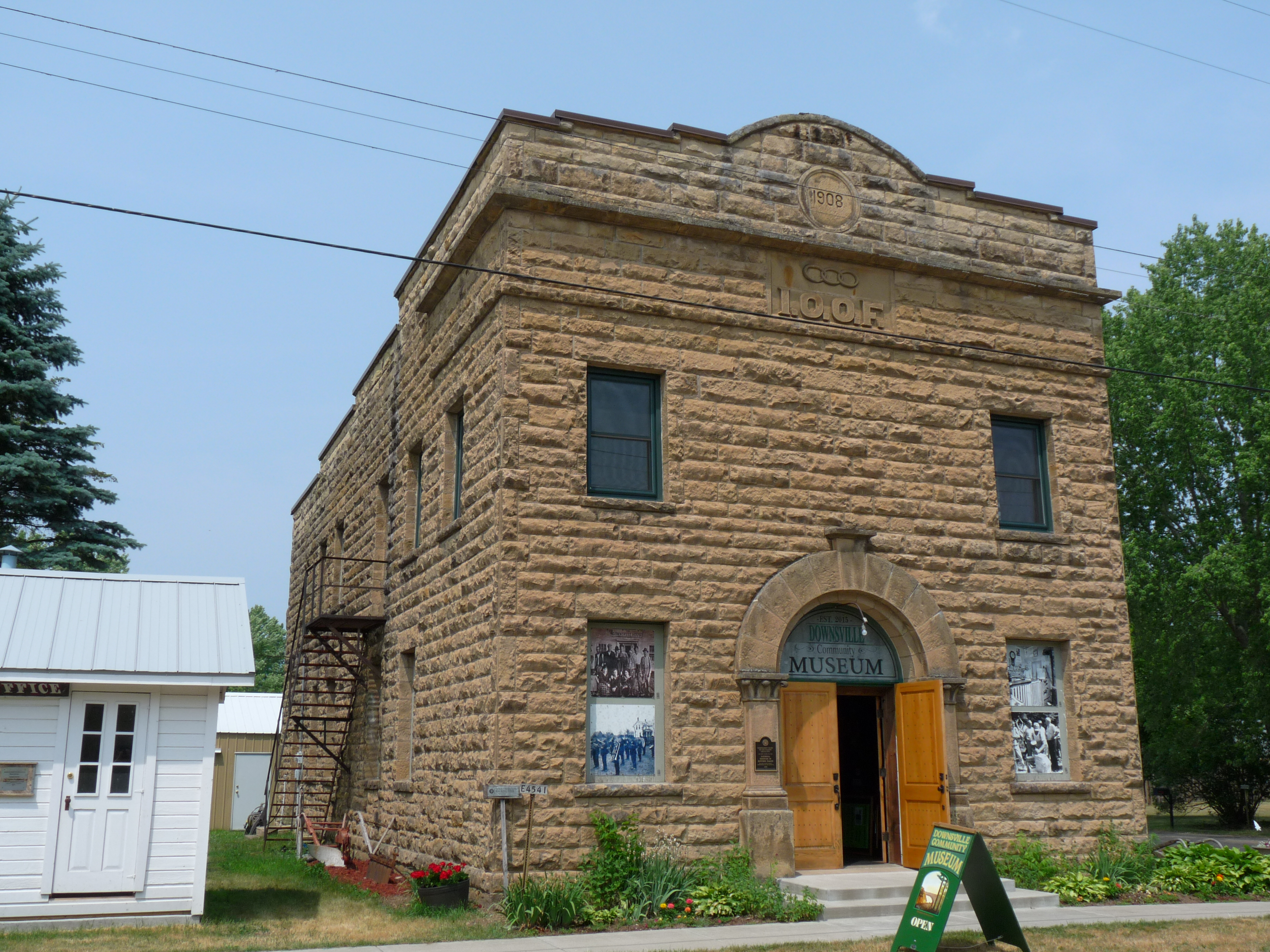
Downsville's Lodge 1961 of the Independent Order of Odd Fellows built this hall in 1908. It is now a local museum and the building is listed on the National Register of Historic Places.
