= Caryville, Wisconsin =

- Unincorporated community
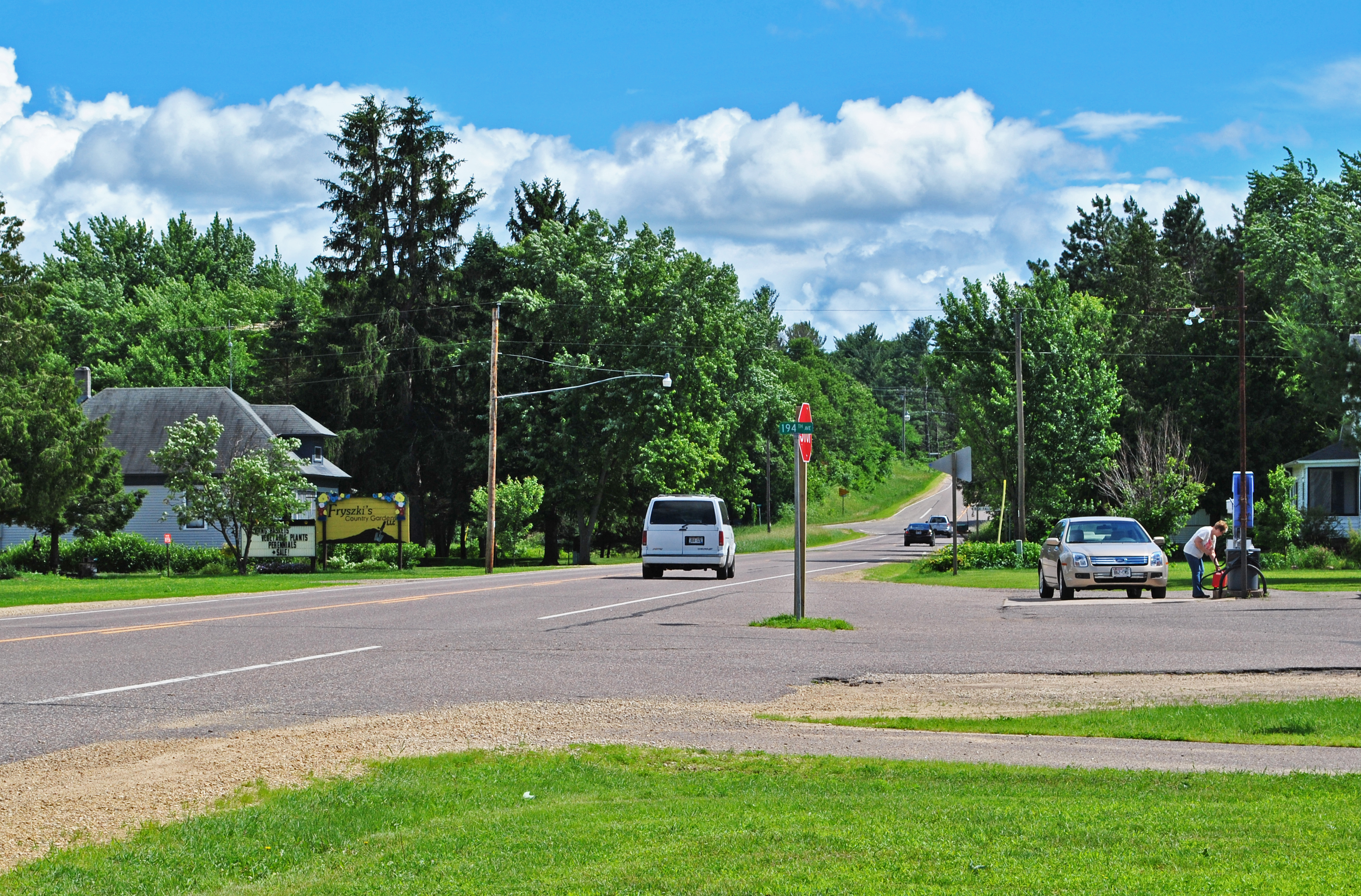

- Location within Wisconsin Location within the United States
- Coordinates: 44.75139°N 91.67444°W
- Country: United States
- State: Wisconsin
- County: Dunn
- Town: Rock Creek
- Elevation: 758 ft (231 m)
- Time zone: UTC-6 (Central (CST))
  - Summer (DST): UTC-5 (CDT)
- Area codes: 715 & 534
- GNIS feature ID: 1562755

Caryville is an unincorporated community in the town of Rock Creek, in Dunn County, Wisconsin, United States. The community is on the south shore of the Chippewa River, along State Highway 85, near where Dunn County Highway H crosses the river.

The site of the Hwy H bridge is where a ferry operated from 1910 to 1964 when the bridge was finished. The Caryville ferry was one of six that carried traffic across the Chippewa River in the area designated the Chippewa bottoms, the others being Old Meridean, New Meridean, Fair Play, Tyrone and Rumsey's Landing. The last operator of the Caryville Ferry was F. William (Bill) Alf who ran it from 1949 to 1964 with the help of his sons, Frederick, James, Rodney and Arthur.

== History ==
Founded in the mid-19th century, Caryville had a train station, post office, and Pony Express office by 1895. Menzus R. Bump was designated postmaster of Caryville in 1882. Caryville is popular with fans of paranormal activity, as area legends report that the community's Sand Hill Cemetery, the old Spring Brook School, and Spring Brook Lutheran Church are haunted. 240th Avenue and the Meridean Slough are also reportedly haunted.

== Recreation ==
Caryville is located along the Chippewa River State Trail, a rail trail on an abandoned line of the Milwaukee Road. The Caryville Savanna is a 420-acre (1.7 km^{2}) natural area located on Brush Island in the Chippewa River, approximately 2 miles (3.2 km) west of Caryville (3 miles downriver).
