= Dunn County, Wisconsin =

County in Wisconsin, United States

- County
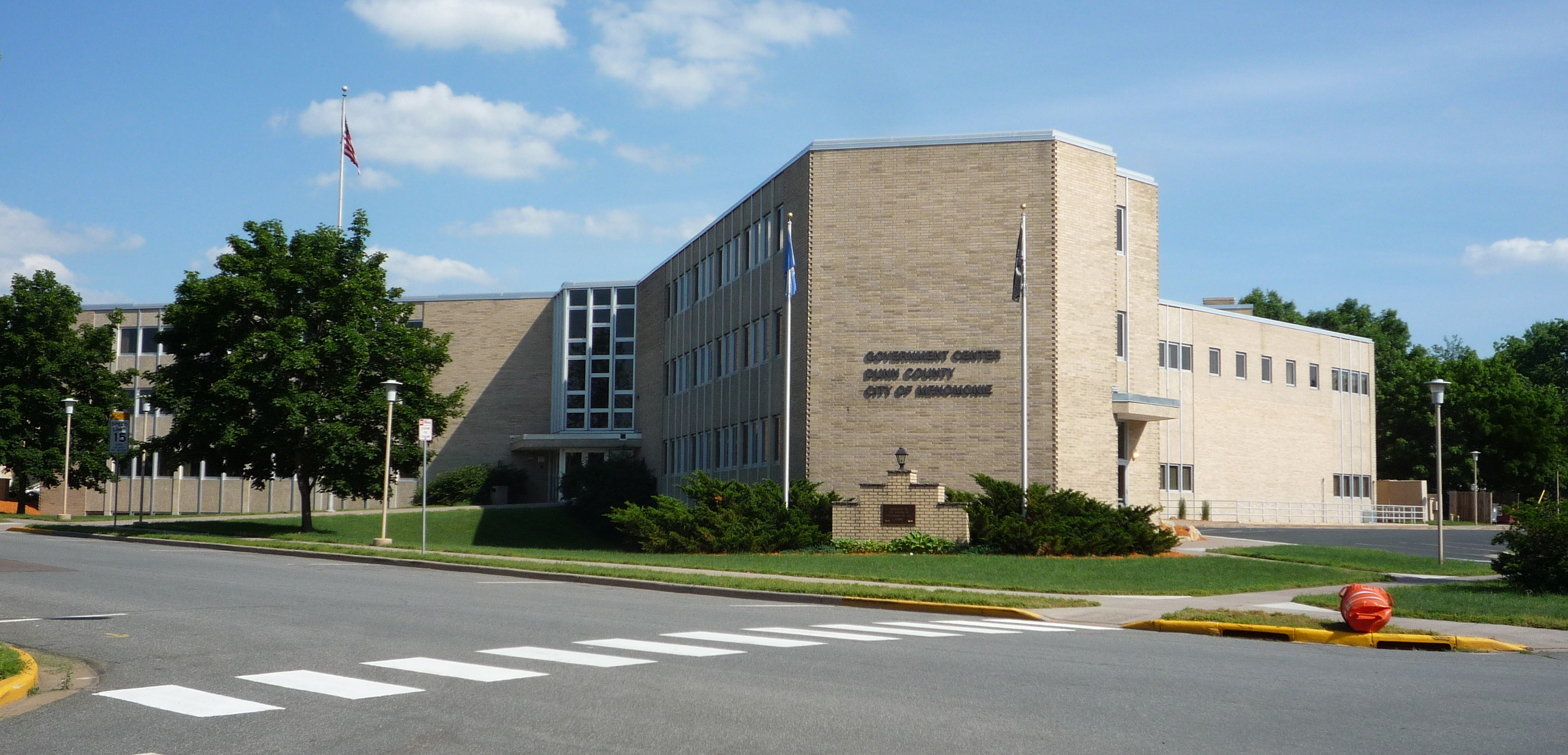
- Dunn County Government Center, Menomonie

- Seal

- Location within the U.S. state of Wisconsin
- Coordinates: 44°57′N 91°54′W
- Country: United States
- State: Wisconsin
- Founded: 1857
- Named for: Charles Dunn
- Seat: Menomonie
- Largest city: Menomonie

Area
  - Total: 864 sq mi (2,240 km^{2})
  - Land: 850 sq mi (2,200 km^{2})
  - Water: 14 sq mi (36 km^{2}) 1.6%

Population (2020)
  - Total: 45,440
  - Estimate (2025): 46,223 ▲
  - Density: 53.4/sq mi (20.6/km^{2})
- Time zone: UTC−6 (Central)
  - Summer (DST): UTC−5 (CDT)
- Congressional district: 3rd
- Website: dunncountywi.gov

Dunn County is a county in the U.S. state of Wisconsin. As of the 2020 census, the population was 45,440. Its county seat is Menomonie. Dunn County comprises the Menomonie Micropolitan Statistical Area and is included in the Eau Claire–Menomonie, WI Combined Statistical Area.

== History ==
Dunn county was founded in 1854 from Chippewa County and organized in 1857. It is named for Charles Dunn, the territory's first chief justice.

== Geography ==
According to the U.S. Census Bureau, the county has an area of 864 square miles (2,240 km^{2}), of which 850 square miles (2,200 km^{2}) is land and 14 square miles (36 km^{2}) (1.6%) is water.

=== Adjacent counties ===
- Barron County – north
- Chippewa County – east
- Eau Claire County – southeast
- Pepin County – south
- Pierce County – southwest
- Polk County – northwest
- Saint Croix County – west

=== Major highways ===
- Interstate 94
- U.S. Highway 12
- Highway 25 (Wisconsin)
- Highway 29 (Wisconsin)
- Highway 40 (Wisconsin)
- Highway 64 (Wisconsin)
- Highway 72 (Wisconsin)
- Highway 79 (Wisconsin)
- Highway 85 (Wisconsin)
- Highway 170 (Wisconsin)

=== Railroads ===
- Canadian National
- Union Pacific

=== Buses ===
- Dunn County Transit

=== Airports ===
- Menomonie Municipal Airport (KLUM) serves the county and surrounding communities.
- Boyceville Municipal Airport (3T3) enhances county service.

== Demographics ==
Historical population
| Census | Pop. | Note | %± |
|---|---|---|---|
| 1860 | 2,704 | | — |
| 1870 | 9,488 | | 250.9% |
| 1880 | 16,817 | | 77.2% |
| 1890 | 22,664 | | 34.8% |
| 1900 | 25,043 | | 10.5% |
| 1910 | 25,260 | | 0.9% |
| 1920 | 26,970 | | 6.8% |
| 1930 | 27,037 | | 0.2% |
| 1940 | 27,375 | | 1.3% |
| 1950 | 27,341 | | −0.1% |
| 1960 | 26,156 | | −4.3% |
| 1970 | 29,154 | | 11.5% |
| 1980 | 34,314 | | 17.7% |
| 1990 | 35,909 | | 4.6% |
| 2000 | 39,858 | | 11.0% |
| 2010 | 43,857 | | 10.0% |
| 2020 | 45,440 | | 3.6% |
| 2025 (est.) | 46,223 | ▲ | 1.7% |
U.S. Decennial Census; 1790–1960 1900–1990; 1990–2000 2010 2020

=== Racial and ethnic composition ===
Dunn County, Wisconsin – Racial and ethnic composition Note: the US Census treats Hispanic/Latino as an ethnic category. This table excludes Latinos from the racial categories and assigns them to a separate category. Hispanics/Latinos may be of any race.
| Race / ethnicity (NH = Non-Hispanic) | Pop 1980 | Pop 1990 | Pop 2000 | Pop 2010 | Pop 2020 | % 1980 | % 1990 | % 2000 | % 2010 | % 2020 |
|---|---|---|---|---|---|---|---|---|---|---|
| White alone (NH) | 33,748 | 34,819 | 38,122 | 41,225 | 40,912 | 98.35% | 96.96% | 95.64% | 94.00% | 90.04% |
| Black or African American alone (NH) | 170 | 172 | 135 | 215 | 388 | 0.50% | 0.48% | 0.34% | 0.49% | 0.85% |
| Native American or Alaska Native alone (NH) | 85 | 93 | 95 | 152 | 157 | 0.25% | 0.26% | 0.24% | 0.35% | 0.35% |
| Asian alone (NH) | 124 | 628 | 847 | 1,141 | 1,451 | 0.36% | 1.75% | 2.13% | 2.60% | 3.19% |
| Native Hawaiian or Pacific Islander alone (NH) | x | x | 4 | 15 | 13 | x | x | 0.01% | 0.03% | 0.03% |
| Other race alone (NH) | 94 | 9 | 26 | 13 | 88 | 0.27% | 0.03% | 0.07% | 0.03% | 0.19% |
| Mixed race or Multiracial (NH) | x | x | 294 | 470 | 1,396 | x | x | 0.74% | 1.07% | 3.07% |
| Hispanic or Latino (any race) | 93 | 188 | 335 | 626 | 1,035 | 0.27% | 0.52% | 0.84% | 1.43% | 2.28% |
| Total | 34,314 | 35,909 | 39,858 | 43,857 | 45,440 | 100.00% | 100.00% | 100.00% | 100.00% | 100.00% |

=== 2020 census ===
As of the 2020 census, the county had a population of 45,440. The median age was 35.8 years, 20.4% of residents were under the age of 18, and 16.5% of residents were 65 years of age or older. For every 100 females there were 106.5 males, and for every 100 females age 18 and over there were 106.4 males age 18 and over.

The population density was 53.4 people per square mile (20.6 people/km^{2}). There were 18,693 housing units at an average density of 22.0 units per square mile (8.5 units/km^{2}); 6.8% of those units were vacant, 66.5% of occupied units were owner-occupied, and 33.5% were renter-occupied. The homeowner vacancy rate was 0.8% and the rental vacancy rate was 5.1%.

The racial makeup of the county was 90.7% White, 0.9% Black or African American, 0.5% American Indian and Alaska Native, 3.2% Asian, <0.1% Native Hawaiian and Pacific Islander, 1.0% from some other race, and 3.8% from two or more races. Hispanic or Latino residents of any race comprised 2.3% of the population.

37.5% of residents lived in urban areas, while 62.5% lived in rural areas.

There were 17,414 households in the county, of which 27.3% had children under the age of 18 living in them. Of all households, 48.1% were married-couple households, 21.1% were households with a male householder and no spouse or partner present, and 22.2% were households with a female householder and no spouse or partner present. About 28.1% of all households were made up of individuals and 11.3% had someone living alone who was 65 years of age or older.

=== 2000 census ===
2000 Census Age Pyramid for Dunn County

As of the census of 2000, there were 39,858 people, 14,337 households, and 9,261 families residing in the county. The population density was 47 people per square mile (18 people/km^{2}). There were 15,277 housing units at an average density of 18 units per square mile (6.9 units/km^{2}). The racial makeup of the county was 96.08% White, 0.34% Black or African American, 0.27% Native American, 2.13% Asian, 0.01% Pacific Islander, 0.37% from other races, and 0.80% from two or more races. 0.84% of the population were Hispanic or Latino of any race. 39.3% were of German, 22.6% Norwegian and 5.1% Irish ancestry. 95.7% spoke English, 1.6% Spanish and 1.5% Hmong as their first language.

There were 14,337 households, out of which 31.40% had children under the age of 18 living with them, 54.10% were married couples living together, 6.90% had a female householder with no husband present, and 35.40% were non-families. 24.40% of all households were made up of individuals, and 9.00% had someone living alone who was 65 years of age or older. The average household size was 2.57 and the average family size was 3.07.

In the county, the population was spread out, with 23.30% under the age of 18, 19.80% from 18 to 24, 25.70% from 25 to 44, 19.80% from 45 to 64, and 11.20% who were 65 years of age or older. The median age was 31 years. For every 100 females there were 101.70 males. For every 100 females age 18 and over, there were 102.20 males.

In 2017, there were 443 births, giving a general fertility rate of 47.7 births per 1000 women aged 15–44, the fourth lowest rate out of all 72 Wisconsin counties.

== Communities ==
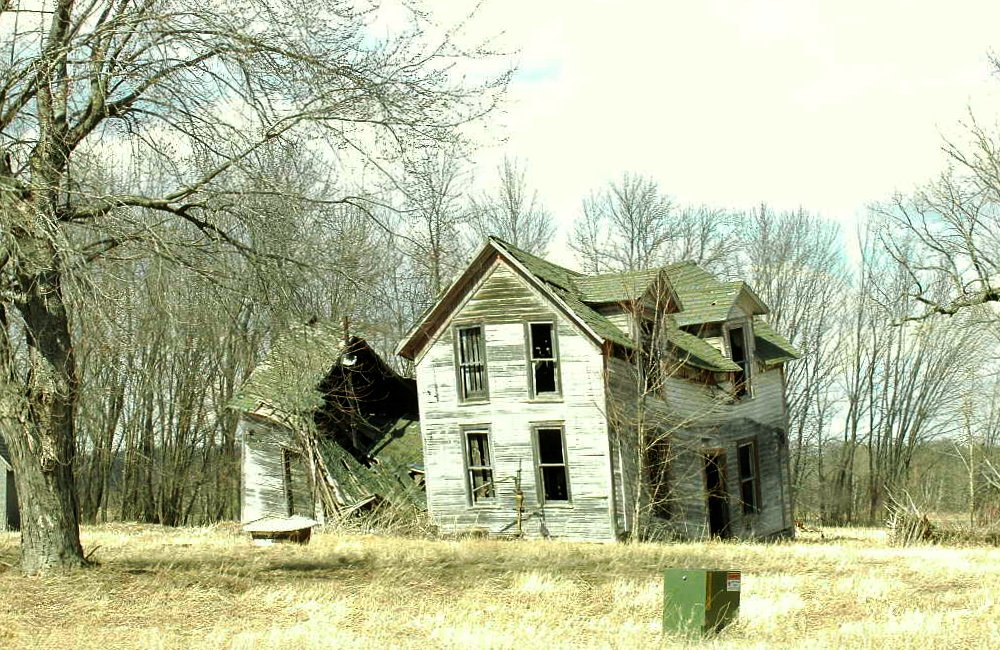
Old farmhouse in Dunn County

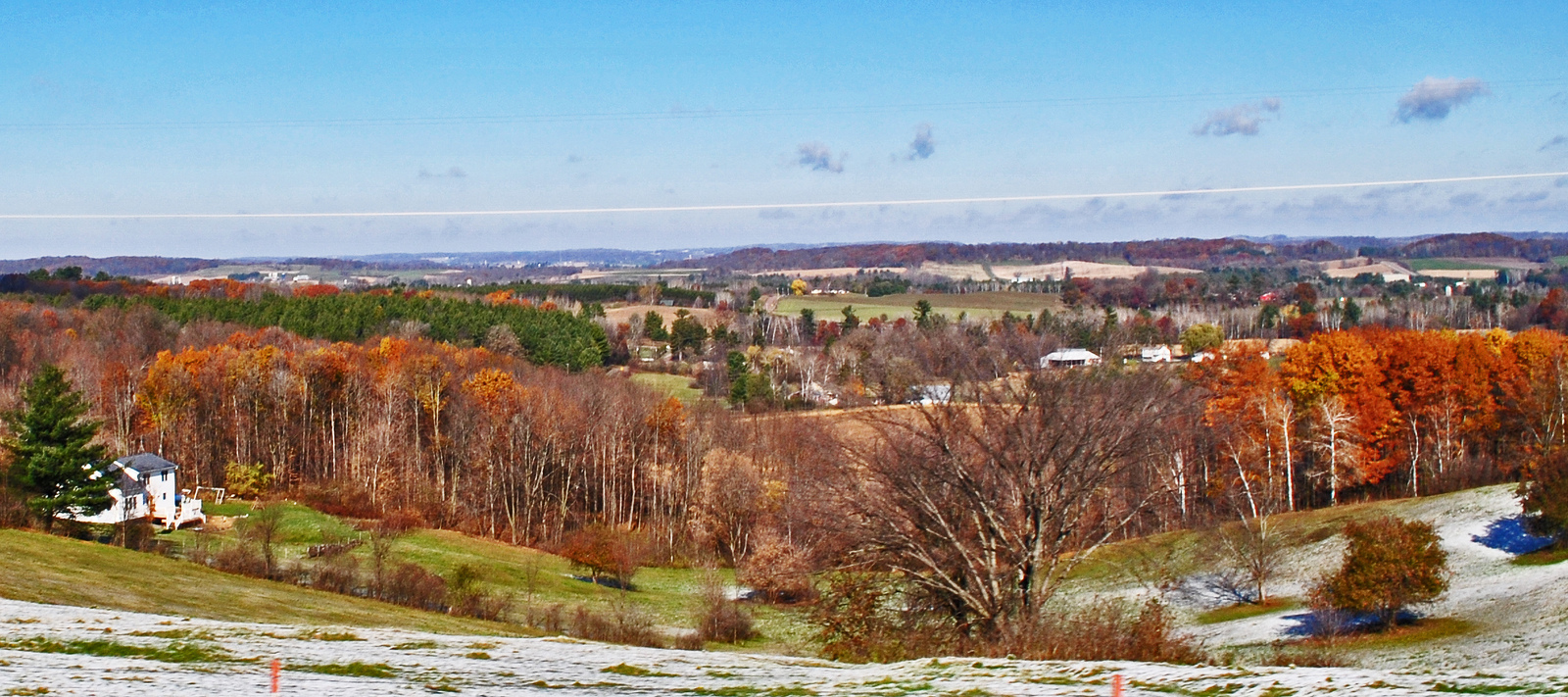
Dunn County, WI, countryside, west of Menomonie

=== City ===
- Menomonie (county seat)

=== Villages ===
- Boyceville
- Colfax
- Downing
- Elk Mound
- Knapp
- Ridgeland
- Wheeler

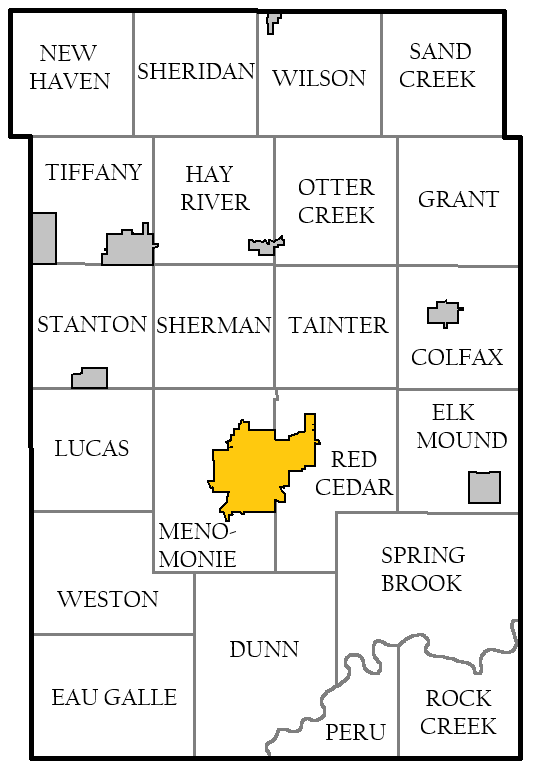
Towns of Dunn County

=== Towns ===
- Colfax
- Dunn
- Eau Galle
- Elk Mound
- Grant
- Hay River
- Lucas
- Menomonie
- New Haven
- Otter Creek
- Peru
- Red Cedar
- Rock Creek
- Sand Creek
- Sheridan
- Sherman
- Spring Brook
- Stanton
- Tainter
- Tiffany
- Weston
- Wilson

=== Census-designated places ===
- Downsville
- Rock Falls
- Tainter Lake

=== Unincorporated communities ===
- Baxter
- Caryville
- Cedar Falls
- Comfort
- Connorsville
- Dunnville
- Eau Galle
- Falls City
- Graytown (partial)
- Hatchville (partial)
- Irvington
- Meridean
- Norton
- Red Cedar
- Rusk
- Sand Creek
- Weston

=== Ghost towns/neighborhoods ===
- Old Tyrone
- Welch Point

== Politics ==
United States presidential election results for Dunn County, Wisconsin
| Year | Republican | | Democratic | | Third party(ies) | |
| Year | No. | % | No. | % | No. | % |
|---|---|---|---|---|---|---|
| 1892 | 2,169 | 50.93% | 1,257 | 29.51% | 833 | 19.56% |
| 1896 | 3,370 | 67.94% | 1,418 | 28.59% | 172 | 3.47% |
| 1900 | 3,046 | 70.79% | 1,110 | 25.80% | 147 | 3.42% |
| 1904 | 3,303 | 81.25% | 546 | 13.43% | 216 | 5.31% |
| 1908 | 3,297 | 74.39% | 914 | 20.62% | 221 | 4.99% |
| 1912 | 1,403 | 37.45% | 833 | 22.24% | 1,510 | 40.31% |
| 1916 | 2,556 | 60.04% | 1,447 | 33.99% | 254 | 5.97% |
| 1920 | 5,596 | 87.85% | 491 | 7.71% | 283 | 4.44% |
| 1924 | 3,177 | 40.13% | 284 | 3.59% | 4,455 | 56.28% |
| 1928 | 7,096 | 76.51% | 2,045 | 22.05% | 133 | 1.43% |
| 1932 | 3,898 | 42.80% | 4,936 | 54.19% | 274 | 3.01% |
| 1936 | 4,570 | 41.64% | 5,619 | 51.20% | 786 | 7.16% |
| 1940 | 6,968 | 59.87% | 4,545 | 39.05% | 126 | 1.08% |
| 1944 | 5,980 | 60.37% | 3,853 | 38.90% | 72 | 0.73% |
| 1948 | 4,319 | 46.03% | 4,894 | 52.16% | 169 | 1.80% |
| 1952 | 7,475 | 67.38% | 3,593 | 32.39% | 26 | 0.23% |
| 1956 | 6,401 | 60.36% | 4,189 | 39.50% | 14 | 0.13% |
| 1960 | 6,723 | 59.82% | 4,487 | 39.92% | 29 | 0.26% |
| 1964 | 3,964 | 37.90% | 6,475 | 61.91% | 19 | 0.18% |
| 1968 | 5,415 | 51.44% | 4,392 | 41.73% | 719 | 6.83% |
| 1972 | 6,660 | 53.04% | 5,681 | 45.25% | 215 | 1.71% |
| 1976 | 6,751 | 44.99% | 7,882 | 52.53% | 371 | 2.47% |
| 1980 | 7,428 | 43.47% | 7,743 | 45.31% | 1,917 | 11.22% |
| 1984 | 8,473 | 51.80% | 7,712 | 47.15% | 173 | 1.06% |
| 1988 | 7,273 | 43.83% | 9,205 | 55.47% | 116 | 0.70% |
| 1992 | 5,283 | 29.00% | 7,965 | 43.72% | 4,970 | 27.28% |
| 1996 | 4,917 | 31.90% | 7,536 | 48.89% | 2,962 | 19.22% |
| 2000 | 8,911 | 46.10% | 9,172 | 47.45% | 1,247 | 6.45% |
| 2004 | 10,879 | 46.95% | 12,039 | 51.95% | 254 | 1.10% |
| 2008 | 9,566 | 41.61% | 13,002 | 56.56% | 421 | 1.83% |
| 2012 | 10,224 | 46.49% | 11,316 | 51.46% | 452 | 2.06% |
| 2016 | 11,486 | 51.96% | 9,034 | 40.87% | 1,586 | 7.17% |
| 2020 | 13,173 | 56.00% | 9,897 | 42.07% | 454 | 1.93% |
| 2024 | 14,726 | 57.35% | 10,643 | 41.45% | 309 | 1.20% |

== See also ==
- National Register of Historic Places listings in Dunn County, Wisconsin
