= Wisconsin Highway 79 =

State Highway in Wisconsin, United States

State Trunk Highway 79
- WIS 79 highlighted in red

Route information
- Maintained by WisDOT
- Length: 17.63 mi (28.37 km)

Major junctions
- South end: US 12 northeast of Menomonie
- WIS 170 in Boyceville
- North end: WIS 64 in Connorsville

Location
- Country: United States
- State: Wisconsin
- Counties: Dunn

Highway system
- Wisconsin State Trunk Highway System; Interstate; US; State; Scenic; Rustic
← WIS 78	→ WIS 80

State Trunk Highway 79 (often called Highway 79, STH-79 or WIS 79) is a 17.63-mile (28.37 km) state highway in Dunn County, Wisconsin, United States, that runs from U.S. Route 12 northwest of the city of Menomonie north to Wisconsin Highway 64 in Connorsville. WIS 79 is maintained by the Wisconsin Department of Transportation.

== Route description ==
WIS 79 begins at an intersection with US 12 in the Town of Menomonie, northwest of the city of Menomonie. From here, the highway heads north across a Union Pacific Railroad line and passes through farmland. The route continues north into the Town of Sherman, where it intersects County Highway J. After crossing into the Town of Stanton, WIS 79 enters the village of Boyceville. The highway passes the Boyceville Municipal Airport before intersecting WIS 170; it follows this highway west for 430 feet (130 m) before turning northward. WIS 79 crosses a Canadian National Railway line and Tiffany Creek before leaving Boyceville and entering the Town of Tiffany. In Tiffany, the route intersects County Highway N before crossing the South Fork Hay River, after which it roughly follows the river northwest. After meeting County Highway O and crossing into the Town of New Haven, WIS 79 enters the community of Connorsville, where it terminates at WIS 64; the road continues northward as County Highway K.

== Major intersections ==
The entire route is in Dunn County.

Location	mi	km	Destinations	Notes
Town of Menomonie	0.0	0.0	US 12 – Knapp, Menomonie	
Boyceville	9.2	14.8	WIS 170 east – Wheeler	East end of WI 170 concurrency
Boyceville	9.2	14.8	WIS 170 west – Downing, Glenwood City	West end of WI 170 concurrency
Connorsville	17.6	28.3	WIS 64 – New Richmond, Bloomer	
1.000 mi = 1.609 km; 1.000 km = 0.621 mi: Concurrency terminus
