= Wisconsin Highway 170 =

State highway in Wisconsin, United States

State Trunk Highway 170
- WIS 170 highlighted in red

Route information
- Maintained by WisDOT
- Length: 23.98 mi (38.59 km)

Major junctions
- West end: WIS 128 in Glenwood City
- WIS 79 in Boyceville; WIS 25 in Wheeler
- East end: WIS 40 in Colfax

Location
- Country: United States
- State: Wisconsin
- Counties: St. Croix, Dunn

Highway system
- Wisconsin State Trunk Highway System; Interstate; US; State; Scenic; Rustic
← WIS 169	→ WIS 171

State Trunk Highway 170 (often called Highway 170, STH-170 or WIS 170) is a 23.98-mile (38.59 km) state highway in St. Croix and Dunn counties in Wisconsin, United States that runs east–west from Glenwood City to near Colfax.

== Route description ==
WIS 170 begins at the intersection of 1st street and Oak Street in Glenwood City. 1st Street north and Oak Street west of the intersection are part of WIS 128. The highway runs south along 1st Street until meeting Maple Street, on which it runs east. It continues along this routing until it reaches Downing, where it intersects County Trunk Highway (CTH) G and CTH-Q. East of Downing, the route starts following a railroad which it follows or runs near for the rest of the route. Within Boyceville, the highway follows a very short concurrency with WIS 79. East of Boyceville, the highway follows or stays near the Hay River, which the railroad also follows. It passes through an intersection with WIS 25 in Wheeler and continues along the railroad/Hay River alignment until the Hay River drains into Tainter Lake, east of which the highway follows the railroad along the Red Cedar River before terminating at WIS 40 in Colfax.

== Major intersections ==
County	Location	mi	km	Destinations	Notes
St. Croix	Glenwood City	0.0	0.0	WIS 128 – Spring Valley	
Dunn	Boyceville	7.4	11.9	WIS 79 north – Connorsville	Very short concurrency with WIS 79
Dunn	Boyceville	7.4	11.9	WIS 79 south – Menomonie	Very short concurrency with WIS 79
Dunn	Wheeler	13.8	22.2	WIS 25 – Ridgeland, Menomonie	
Dunn	Colfax	23.9	38.5	WIS 40 – Bloomer	
1.000 mi = 1.609 km; 1.000 km = 0.621 mi: Concurrency terminus
