= Tainter =

Tainter can refer to:

== People ==
- Charles Sumner Tainter (1854-1940), engineer and inventor
- Jeremiah Burnham Tainter (1836-1920), engineer
- Joseph Tainter (born 1949), anthropologist and historian

== Places in the United States ==
- Tainter, Wisconsin, a town
- Tainter Lake, Wisconsin a census-designated place
- Tainter Lake (Dunn County, Wisconsin), a reservoir

== Other ==
- Tainter gate on a dam

== See also ==
- Taintor, a surname
