= William Millar (politician) =

19th century American politician

Member of the Wisconsin Senate from the 30th district
- In office January 7, 1889 – January 2, 1893
- Preceded by: George Clay Ginty
- Succeeded by: Levi F. Martin

Member of the Wisconsin State Assembly from the Dunn district
- In office January 3, 1887 – January 7, 1889
- Preceded by: John M. Oddie
- Succeeded by: Stewart J. Bailey

Personal details
- Born: October 5, 1839 County Dublin, Ireland, UK
- Died: February 5, 1913 (aged 73) Red Cedar, Wisconsin, U.S.
- Resting place: Waneka Cemetery, Elk Mound, Wisconsin
- Party: Republican
- Spouse: Sarah Jane McCormick
- Children: Mary A. (Rickard)^{(b. 1867; died 1953)}; James David Millar^{(b. 1869; died 1948)}; John H. Millar^{(b. 1870; died 1872)}; Mary "Maud" (Stoner)^{(b. 1875; died 1902)}; William Millar Jr.^{(b. 1882; died 1956)}; Marguerite (Jasperson)^{(b. 1890; died 1965)}; Alice J. "Nellie" (Dickson)^{(b. 1880; died 1967)}
- Occupation: Lumberman, farmer

William Millar, Sr., (October 5, 1839 – February 5, 1913) was a Scotch-Irish American immigrant, farmer, and Wisconsin pioneer. He was a member of the Wisconsin State Senate (1889 & 1891) and Assembly (1887), representing Dunn County. His last name was spelled Miller in some historical sources. (Note: The 1887, 1889, and 1891 Wisconsin Blue Books spelled his name "Miller", and so later volumes that relied on that data to compile historical lists of legislators also spelled it that way. His obituary, his son, and his grave, however, spell it "Millar".)

== Biography ==
Millar was born near Dublin, Ireland, on October 5, 1839. He attended a select school in Ireland before emigrating with his family to the United States in 1850. He was raised working with his father on a farm in Waukesha County, Wisconsin. In 1857, the family moved to their own farm in what is now the town of Red Cedar, Wisconsin, and William was sent to attend high school at the nearby village of La Crosse, Wisconsin.

At age 19 went to work as a lumberman near Eau Claire, Wisconsin, for the Dole, Ingram & Kennedy company. He worked 13 years in this profession and for the last seven years of that time, he was also a manager and investor in the logging company. Over those years, he gradually accumulated land for his own estate in Red Cedar, eventually owning about 400 acres.

He was one of the founders of the Dunn County Agricultural Society in 1885 and served as its first president. The following year, he was elected to the Wisconsin State Assembly, running on the Republican Party ticket. Rather than running for re-election in 1888, he ran for and won a four-year term in the Wisconsin State Senate. He did not run for re-election in 1892.

His health declined gradually over the subsequent years, and he died on his farm in Red Cedar on February 5, 1913.

== Personal life and family ==
Millar was born to a Scottish father and Irish mother. He was the second of eight children born to David Millar and his wife Margaret (née Riley). Two of his younger brothers, James and Robert, fought for the Union Army in the American Civil War—James was killed at Spotsylvania Court House.

William Millar married Sarah Jane McCormick, the daughter of another Dunn County pioneer. They had seven children together, though one son died in infancy. Their eldest son, James David Millar, also went on to serve in the Wisconsin State Assembly.

== Electoral history ==
=== Wisconsin Assembly (1886) ===
Wisconsin Assembly, Dunn District Election, 1886
| Party | Candidate | Votes | % | ±% |
|---|---|---|---|---|
General Election, November 2, 1886
| Republican | William Millar | 1,740 | 57.50% | −8.31% |
| Democratic | H. W. Nelson | 741 | 24.49% | −9.70% |
| Labor | F. T. Vasey | 545 | 18.01% | |
| Plurality | | 999 | 33.01% | +1.39% |
| Total votes | | 3,026 | 100.0% | -21.44% |
| Republican hold | | | | |

=== Wisconsin Senate (1888) ===
Wisconsin Senate, 30th District Election, 1888
| Party | Candidate | Votes | % | ±% |
|---|---|---|---|---|
General Election, November 6, 1888
| Republican | William Millar | 4,914 | 51.36% | |
| Democratic | William H. Smith | 4,092 | 42.77% | |
| Prohibition | D. D. McPherson | 561 | 5.86% | |
| Plurality | | 822 | 8.59% | |
| Total votes | | 9,567 | 100.0% | |
| Republican hold | | | | |

== Notes ==
Wisconsin State Assembly
| Preceded by John M. Oddie | Member of the Wisconsin State Assembly from the Dunn district January 3, 1887 – January 7, 1889 | Succeeded by Stewart J. Bailey |
Wisconsin Senate
| Preceded by George Clay Ginty | Member of the Wisconsin Senate from the 30th district January 7, 1889 – January 2, 1893 | Succeeded by Levi F. Martin |
