= 3T3 =

3T3 may refer to:

- Boyceville Municipal Airport (FAA LID), an airport in Wisconsin
- 3T3 cells, a cell line established in 1962 by two scientists at the Department of Pathology in the New York University School of Medicine
