= Ole G. Kinney =

American politician (1858–1922)

Member of the Wisconsin State Assembly from the Dunn district
- In office January 5, 1903 – January 7, 1907
- Preceded by: Albert R. Hall
- Succeeded by: D. C. Coolidge

Personal details
- Born: June 1, 1858 Dane County, Wisconsin, U.S.
- Died: December 26, 1922 (aged 64) Superior, Wisconsin, U.S.
- Cause of death: Stroke
- Resting place: Holden Lutheran Cemetery, Colfax, Wisconsin
- Party: Republican

Ole Gunderson Kinney (June 1, 1858 – December 26, 1922) was an American merchant and Republican politician. He served two terms in the Wisconsin State Assembly, representing Dunn County, and was elected to the Wisconsin State Senate in 1922, but died before taking office.

== Biography ==
Born in Dane County, Wisconsin, Kinney's family moved to Crawford County in 1860 and then to Dunn County in 1863. He was educated in the public schools. He was a merchant and grain trader. Kinney was president of the Community Savings Bank in Superior, Wisconsin. Kinney served as the Colfax Town clerk and also served as chairman of the Colfax Town Board. From 1903 to 1907, Kinney served in the Wisconsin State Assembly and was a Republican. In 1922, Kinney was elected to the Wisconsin State Senate from the 11th State Senate district. Kinney had a stroke on October 31, 1922 and died in Superior, Wisconsin, before he took the oath of office.
