= Albert R. Hall (Minnesota and Wisconsin politician) =

American politician (1841–1905)

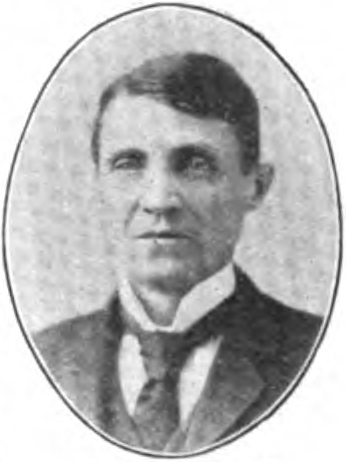
- Portrait from The Blue Book of the State of Wisconsin (1901)

12th Speaker of the Minnesota House of Representatives
- In office 1872–1874
- Preceded by: John L. Merriam
- Succeeded by: William R. Kinyon

Member of the Wisconsin State Assembly from the Dunn district
- In office January 5, 1891 – January 5, 1903
- Preceded by: Stewart J. Bailey
- Succeeded by: Ole G. Kinney

Personal details
- Born: April 20, 1841 Hartford, Vermont, U.S.
- Died: June 2, 1905 (aged 64) Knapp, Dunn County, Wisconsin, U.S.
- Cause of death: Bright's disease
- Resting place: Lakewood Cemetery, Minneapolis, Minnesota
- Party: Republican
- Profession: Farmer

Military service
- Allegiance: United States
- Branch/service: United States Volunteers; Union Army
- Years of service: 1861–1865
- Rank: 1st Lieutenant, USV
- Unit: 2nd Reg. Minn. Vol. Infantry; 11th Reg. Minn. Vol. Infantry
- Battles/wars: American Civil War: Battle of Mill Springs; Battle of Perryville; Battle of Hoover's Gap; Battle of Chickamauga; Atlanta campaign

Albert R. Hall (April 20, 1841 – June 2, 1905) was an American farmer, businessman, and Republican politician. He served seven terms in the Minnesota House of Representatives, representing Hennepin County, and was speaker from 1872 until 1874. He later moved to Dunn County, Wisconsin, and served six terms in the Wisconsin State Assembly (1891–1903). In historical documents, his name is sometimes abbreviated as A. R. Hall.

== Early life ==
Albert R. Hall was born in Hartford, Vermont, in 1841. At age four, his parents moved the family to Boston, Massachusetts. Hall attended Boston's public schools until 1856, when the family moved to the Minnesota Territory.

== Civil War service ==
At the outbreak of the American Civil War, Hall volunteered for service with the Union Army and was enrolled as a private in Company D, 2nd Minnesota Infantry Regiment. With this regiment, he served in the Army of the Cumberland in the western theater of the war and was promoted to corporal and then first sergeant. In the campaign for control of Middle Tennessee, he participated in the battles of Mill Springs, Perryville, Hoover's Gap, and Chickamauga. At Chickamauga, he was shot in the torso and left for dead on the battlefield. He survived and was captured, but was paroled after just ten days of captivity. He returned to his regiment near Resaca, Georgia, where he joined the Atlanta campaign. During this campaign, his three-year enlistment expired and he returned to Minnesota. He assisted in recruiting new volunteers for the 11th Minnesota Infantry Regiment and was commissioned as 1st lieutenant for Company G of the regiment. He returned to the field with the new regiment in the Fall of 1864 and was appointed provost marshal at Gallatin, Tennessee, where he remained until the end of the war.

== Postbellum career ==
Back in Minnesota, he served as a town clerk and justice of the peace and was elected to the Minnesota House of Representatives for seven terms.

He moved to the village of Knapp in Dunn County, Wisconsin, in 1880, where he resided for the rest of his life. In Wisconsin, he formed a business partnership named Hall & Dann for the manufacturing of staves. Their business continued until they exhausted their supply of timber.

He was elected chairman of the town board and was president of the Dunn County Agricultural Society. He was a member of the commission for the construction of the Dunn County Asylum and later served as a trustee of the asylum. He was elected to represent Dunn County in the Wisconsin State Assembly for six terms, retiring in 1903. His sister, Caroline A. Hall (one of the co-founders of The Grange), lived with him in later years.

He died at his home in Knapp on June 2, 1905, after a brief illness. His doctors diagnosed the cause of death as acute Bright's disease. His funeral was well-attended, and included Governor Robert La Follette and other prominent state officials. His body was then taken by train to Minneapolis and buried with his family at Lakewood Cemetery. His sister inherited the farm.

Minnesota House of Representatives
| Preceded by John L. Merriam | Speaker of the Minnesota House of Representatives; 1872–1874 | Succeeded by William R. Kinyon |
Wisconsin State Assembly
| Preceded by Stewart J. Bailey | Member of the Wisconsin State Assembly from the Dunn district January 5, 1891 – January 5, 1903 | Succeeded by Ole G. Kinney |
