= Taintor =

Taintor is a surname. Notable people with the surname include:

- Anne Taintor (born 1953), American artist
- John Taintor Foote (1881–1950), American novelist, playwright, short-story writer, and screenwriter
- Mitchell Taintor (born 1994), American soccer player

== See also ==
- Tainter (disambiguation)
