= The Silver Heart Club =

American power pop band

External videos
- The Silver Heart Club "Picture" Live video. NME Magazine. 2011.

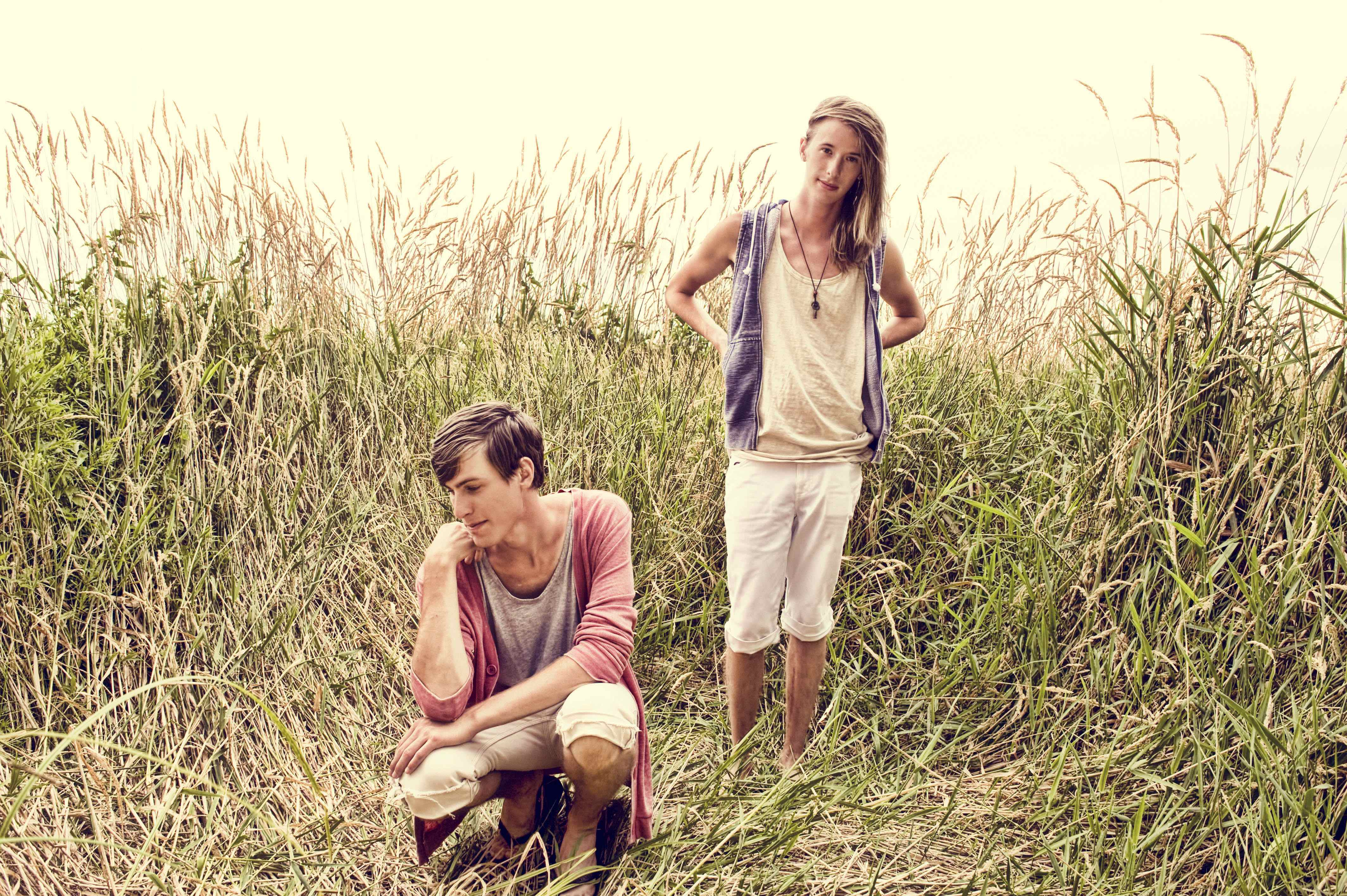
The Silver Heart Club in 2013

The Silver Heart Club are a power pop and rock musical duo formed in 2007 by Bo Weber and Steven Price. Weber and Price were neighbors in Colfax, Wisconsin, and have produced one record album. The duo began after their high school graduation without having musical experience, and decided to become a band prior to developing musical experience. They engineered and produced their first album using equipment and gear they purchased themselves. The band has played concerts at various venues, including an album release concert in September, 2012 at The Oxford Theatre in Eau Claire, Wisconsin, and has been an opening act at concerts with national music acts.

== Discography ==
- Rookie Card (2012)
