= William R. Kinyon =

American politician (1833–1914)

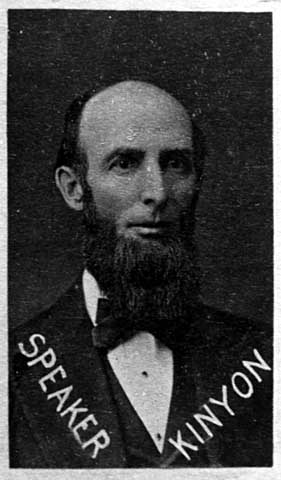

13th Speaker of the Minnesota House of Representatives
- In office 1875–1876
- Preceded by: A.R. Hall
- Succeeded by: John L. Gibbs

Personal details
- Born: February 3, 1833 Mannville, New York
- Died: June 2, 1904 (aged 71)
- Party: Republican
- Spouse: Maryette Gillett
- Children: George R. Kinyon
- Education: Union College
- Profession: Banker

William Riley Kinyon (February 3, 1833 – June 2, 1914) was born and raised in Mannsville, New York. He was a Minnesota politician and Speaker of the Minnesota House of Representatives, representing Owatonna. His first year of service in the Minnesota House of Representatives was in 1868. After leaving the House as a representative, he served as Clerk of the House from 1869 to 1870. He was elected back to the body in 1874, and served as Speaker from 1875 to 1876.

Educated in the district schools of Jefferson County, New York; Union Academy Belleville, NY, and graduated from Union College, Schenectady, New York, 1856. Moved to Juneau, Wisconsin in 1856 and was teacher in the public schools there for 1 year. He passed his Wisconsin Bar exam in 1858 after reading law in a law office. Moved to Owatonna in 1858 and engaged in the practice of law. William established a private bank with J.C. Easton in 1866; business was absorbed by First National Bank of Owatonna in 1871, of which William was made President and served until 1903. Commissioned Lieut. Colonel, Minnesota National Guard in 1861.

Political offices
Preceded by A.R. Hall	Speaker of the Minnesota House of Representatives; 1875 – 1876	Succeeded by John L. Gibbs
