= Tornado outbreak of June 3–4, 1958 =

Weather event in the United States

1958 Chippewa Valley tornado outbreak
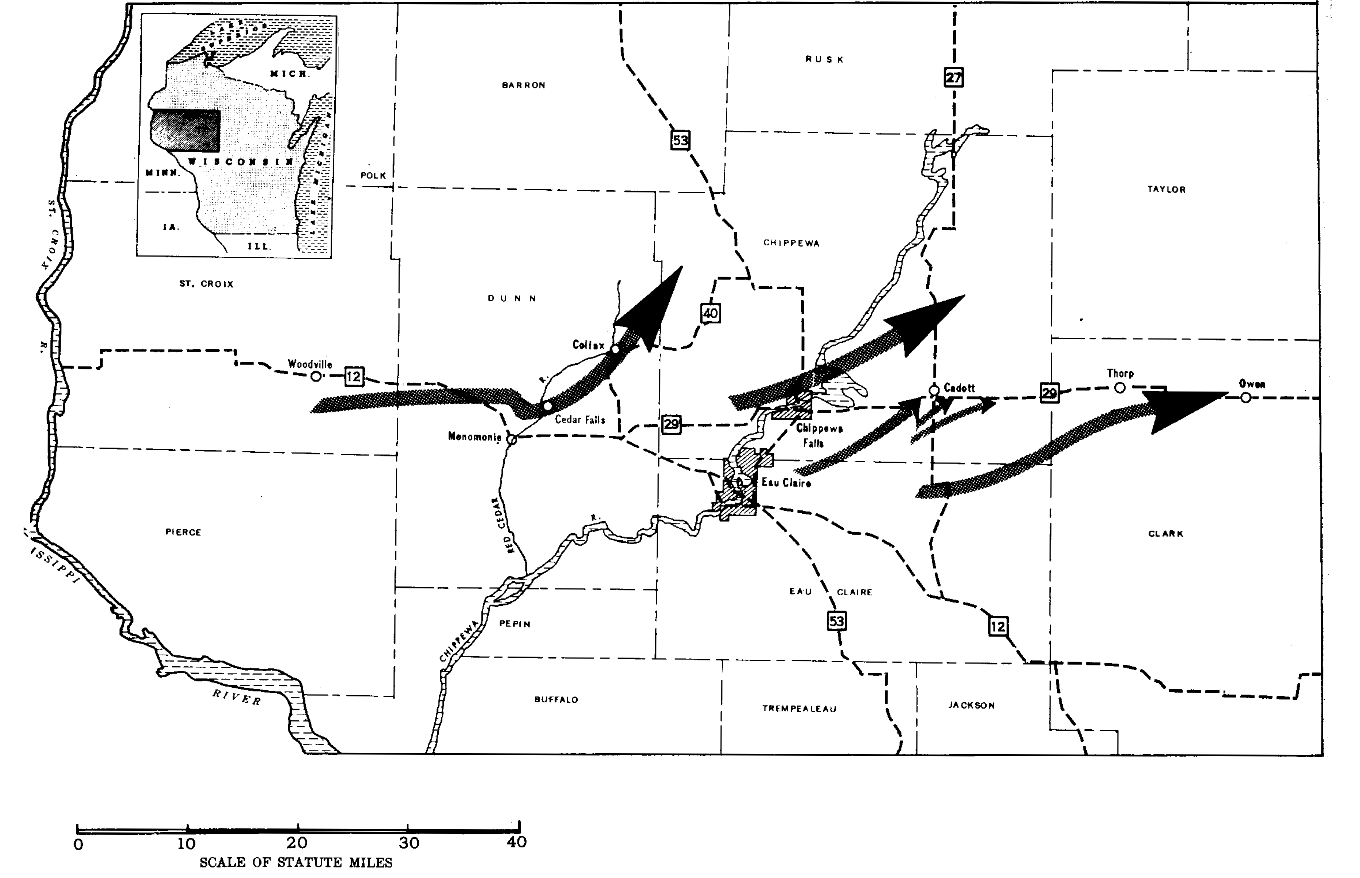
- A map showing the significant tornadoes across the Lower Chippewa Valley.

Meteorological history
- Duration: June 3-4, 1958

Tornado outbreak
- Tornadoes: 13+
- Max. rating: F5 tornado
- Duration: 1 day, 4 hours, 10 minutes

Overall effects
- Fatalities: 27 (+1 non tornadic)
- Injuries: >175
- Damage: $83.3 million (1958 USD) (Note: All losses are in 1958 USD unless otherwise noted.) $930 million (2025 USD)
- Areas affected: The Upper Midwest (Primarily Northwestern Wisconsin)
- Part of tornado outbreaks of 1958

On June 3–4, 1958, a destructive tornado outbreak, also known as the Chippewa Valley Tornado Outbreak, affected the Upper Midwestern United States. It was the deadliest tornado outbreak in Wisconsin since records began in 1950. The outbreak, which initiated in Central Minnesota, killed at least 28 people, all of whom perished in Northwestern Wisconsin. The outbreak generated a long-lived tornado family that produced four intense tornadoes across the Lower Chippewa Valley, primarily along and near the Chippewa and Eau Claire rivers. The deadliest tornado of the outbreak was a destructive F5 that killed 19 people and injured 110 others in and near Colfax, Wisconsin. (Note: An outbreak is generally defined as a group of at least six tornadoes (the number sometimes varies slightly according to local climatology) with no more than a six-hour gap between individual tornadoes. An outbreak sequence, prior to (after) the start of modern records in 1950, is defined as a period of no more than two (one) consecutive days without at least one significant (F2 or stronger) tornado.) (Note: The Fujita scale was devised under the aegis of scientist T. Theodore Fujita in the early 1970s. Prior to the advent of the scale in 1971, tornadoes in the United States were officially unrated. While the Fujita scale has been superseded by the Enhanced Fujita scale in the U.S. since February 1, 2007, Canada utilized the old scale until April 1, 2013; nations elsewhere, like the United Kingdom, apply other classifications such as the TORRO scale.) (Note: Historically, the number of tornadoes globally and in the United States was and is likely underrepresented: research by Grazulis on annual tornado activity suggests that, as of 2001, only 53% of yearly U.S. tornadoes were officially recorded. Documentation of tornadoes outside the United States was historically less exhaustive, owing to the lack of monitors in many nations and, in some cases, to internal political controls on public information. Most countries only recorded tornadoes that produced severe damage or loss of life. Significant low biases in U.S. tornado counts likely occurred through the early 1990s, when advanced NEXRAD was first installed and the National Weather Service began comprehensively verifying tornado occurrences.)

== Background ==
Impacts by region
| Region | Locale | Deaths | Injuries | Damages | Source |
|---|---|---|---|---|---|
| United States | Minnesota | 0 | 2 | $250,060 | |
| United States | Montana | 0 | 0 | $30 | |
| United States | Nebraska | 0 | 0 | $25,000 | |
| United States | Wisconsin | 28 | 173 | $83,000,000 | |
| United States | Wyoming | 0 | 0 | $25,060 | |
| Total | | 28 | 175 | $83,300,000 | |

== Confirmed tornadoes ==
Confirmed tornadoes by Fujita rating
| FU | F0 | F1 | F2 | F3 | F4 | F5 | Total |
|---|---|---|---|---|---|---|---|
| 0 | 2 | 4 | 3 | 1 | 2 | 1 | 13 |

=== June 3 event ===
Confirmed tornadoes – Tuesday, June 3, 1958 (Note: All dates are based on the local time zone where the tornado touched down; however, all times are in Coordinated Universal Time and dates are split at midnight CST/CDT for consistency.) (Note: Prior to 1994, only the average widths of tornado paths were officially listed.)
| F# | Location | County / Parish | State | Start coord. | Time (UTC) | Path length | Max. width | Summary |
|---|---|---|---|---|---|---|---|---|
| F2 | S of Shell | Big Horn | WY | 44.53°N 107.78°W | 22:00–? | 0.2 miles (0.32 km) | 17 yards (16 m) | Losses totaled $25,000. Grazulis did not list the tornado as an F2 or stronger. |
| F1 | NNE of Wyodak (1st tornado) | Campbell | WY | 44.30°N 105.37°W | 00:35–? | 1 mile (1.6 km) | 10 yards (9.1 m) | Two small tornadoes developed and occurred simultaneously east of Gillette. Losses totaled $30. |
| F1 | NNE of Wyodak (2nd tornado) | Campbell | WY | 44.30°N 105.37°W | 00:35–? | 1 mile (1.6 km) | 10 yards (9.1 m) | See previous event. Losses totaled $30. |

=== June 4 event ===
Confirmed tornadoes – Wednesday, June 4, 1958
| F# | Location | County / Parish | State | Start coord. | Time (UTC) | Path length | Max. width | Summary |
|---|---|---|---|---|---|---|---|---|
| F0 | S of Paynesville to E of Marty | Stearns | MN | 45.47°N 94.65°W | 22:20–? | ≥0.1 miles (0.16 km) | 33 yards (30 m) | Tornado tracked from Lake Koronis to Pearl Lake, damaging a number of lakeside cottages. Damages were estimated at $30. |
| F2 | S of Albany to WSW of Five Points | Stearns | MN | 45.60°N 94.58°W | 22:20–? | 13.3 miles (21.4 km) | 400 yards (370 m) | Tornado skipped past St. Joseph and ended somewhere to the west of Sauk Rapids. Thirty-seven farms incurred at least some degree of damage. Two people were injured and damages were estimated at $250,000. Storm Data and Grazulis listed a total path length of 18 miles (29 km). Barns were destroyed and trees were toppled. |
| F1 | W of St. Martin | Stearns | MN | 45.50°N 94.70°W | 22:20–? | 0.1 miles (0.16 km) | 33 yards (30 m) | Tornado destroyed three barns, injured one person, and caused $30 in damage. Grazulis classified the tornado as an F2. |
| F0 | NW of Portage | Cascade | MT | 47.70°N 111.20°W | 23:25–? | 0.1 miles (0.16 km) | 33 yards (30 m) | Damages were estimated at $30. |
| F5 | SW of Baldwin to Cedar Falls to Colfax to WNW of Bloomer | St. Croix, Dunn, Chippewa | WI | 44.90°N 92.33°W | 23:09–00:30 | 46 miles (74 km) | 2.1 miles (3,700 yd) | 19 deaths – See section on this tornado – 110+ people were injured and damages were estimated at $75 million. |
| F4 | W of Chippewa Falls to NE of Anson | Chippewa | WI | 44.93°N 91.47°W | 00:45–? | 11.1 miles (17.9 km) | 600 yards (550 m) | 4 deaths – Tornado, generated by the same supercell as the Colfax F5, produced severe damage on the northern side of Chippewa Falls. The Glen Loch Motel and the Chippewa Rendering Plant were leveled, the latter of which was built of brick and concrete. Farms northeast of town were leveled as well. A total of 56 people were injured and damages were estimated at $250,000. Tornado passed very close to Irvine Park. |
| F3 | W of Cadott to NW of Boyd | Chippewa | WI | 44.95°N 91.17°W | 01:00–? | 4.3 miles (6.9 km) | 300 yards (270 m) | Tornado was related to the preceding two events. One home was destroyed on the west side of Cadott, possibly at F4-level intensity. Most of the media focused on impacts elsewhere, so there were few details about this event. Three people were injured and damages were estimated at $2.5 million. |
| F1 | W of Milford | Seward | NE | 40.77°N 97.08°W | 01:00–? | 0.1 miles (0.16 km) | 10 yards (9.1 m) | Damages were estimated at $25,000. |
| F2 | ESE of Murry to NE of Hay Stack Corner | Rusk, Sawyer | WI | 45.58°N 91.10°W | 01:10–? | 13.8 miles (22.2 km) | 200 yards (180 m) | Barns were destroyed and acres of forest were leveled. Damages were estimated at $250,000. |
| F4 | Fall Creek to SE of Cadott to W of Wien | Eau Claire, Clark, Marathon | WI | 45.58°N 91.1°W | 01:30–? | 59.2 miles (95.3 km) | 880 yards (800 m) | 4 deaths – Tornado was the last member of the Colfax tornado family. Several farmhouses were destroyed by this tornado family . Damage occurred south of Boyd, Stanley, and Owen, as well as between Withee and Longwood. F1-level damage in Marathon County may have been related to a separate member of the tornado family. Three people were injured and damages were estimated at $5 million. A later unofficial analysis would determine this to be 3 separate tornadoes, 2 F4s and 1 F1 |

=== Colfax, Wisconsin ===
Colfax, Wisconsin
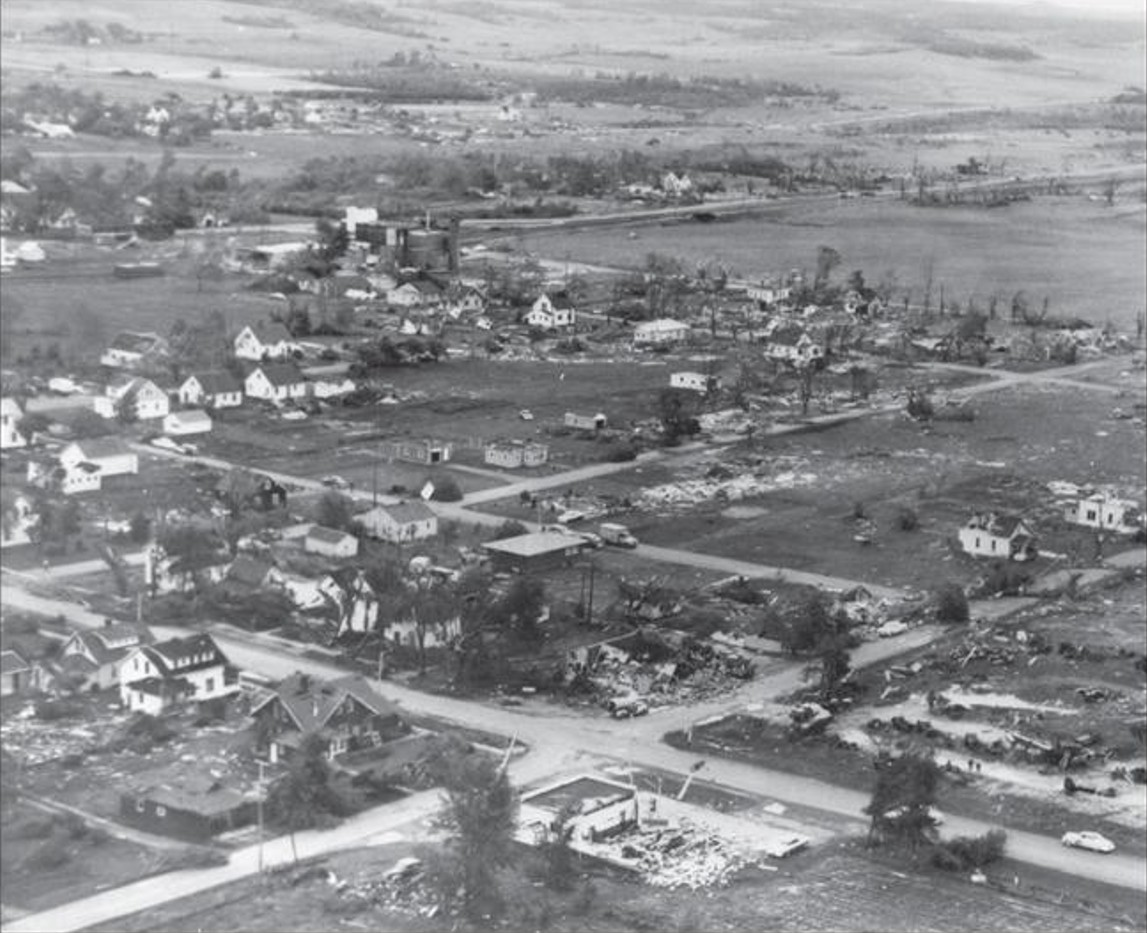
- An aerial of Colfax after the tornado

Meteorological history
- Formed: June 4, 1958, 7:30 p.m. CDT (UTC−05:00)

F5 tornado
- on the Fujita scale
- Highest winds: >261 mph (420 km/h)

Overall effects
- Fatalities: 19
- Injuries: 110+
- Damage: $75 million (1958 USD) ($836,940,000 in 2025 USD)
- Areas affected: St. Croix County, Dunn County and Chippewa County, Wisconsin (primarily north of Menomonie, in the Cedar Falls–Colfax area)

This large and violent tornado, the deadliest of the outbreak, was the first member in a family of four intense tornadoes that tracked approximately 90 miles (140 km) across four counties, its forward speed averaging 52 miles per hour (84 km/h). The first member of this family began approximately four point seven miles (7.6 km) southwest of Baldwin, Wisconsin, at 6:30 p.m. CDT (23:30 UTC). As it headed generally eastward or east-northeastward, the tornado claimed three lives: one near Wilson and two more just south of Knapp. Entering the northern outskirts of Menomonie, the tornado devastated the small settlement of Cedar Falls, destroying 24 of the 25 homes in that community. Four fatalities occurred in or near Cedar Falls, along with several injuries.

After striking Cedar Falls, the tornado turned more to the northeast, and would strike Colfax from the south. Eyewitnesses reported two tornadoes: one in northern Colfax and another just south of downtown. The latter tornado reportedly hit the southeastern section of Colfax. Damage in Colfax alone was estimated at $2 million, and about half of the buildings in town were destroyed. "Dozens" of homes were leveled, several of which were swept away, leaving empty foundations behind. Farmhouses were leveled east of town as well. Cars were picked up and thrown up to 400 yards (370 m) from WIS 40, one of which was found wrapped around the side of a small steel-and-concrete bridge that collapsed during the tornado. Telephone poles were snapped and trees were debarked as well. About 432 farms were damaged or destroyed, along with another 1,032 structures. Debris was found as far as 75 mi (121 km) distant, in Sheldon. At least 12 people within Colfax were killed. After leaving Colfax to the northeast, the tornado would track for nearly 10 more miles, lifting in Chippewa County around 5 miles (8.0 km) west-northwest of Bloomer.

The Colfax tornado was the first official F5 tornado to strike the state since records were made official in 1950, although the 1899 New Richmond tornado is unofficially considered to be F5 as well. The next F5 tornado to strike Wisconsin was on June 8, 1984, when an overnight tornado destroyed Barneveld, killing nine people. Tornado researcher Thomas P. Grazulis assigned an F4 rating to the Colfax tornado in his Significant Tornadoes, but subsequently listed the event as an F5 in his supplementary report F5–F6 Tornadoes.

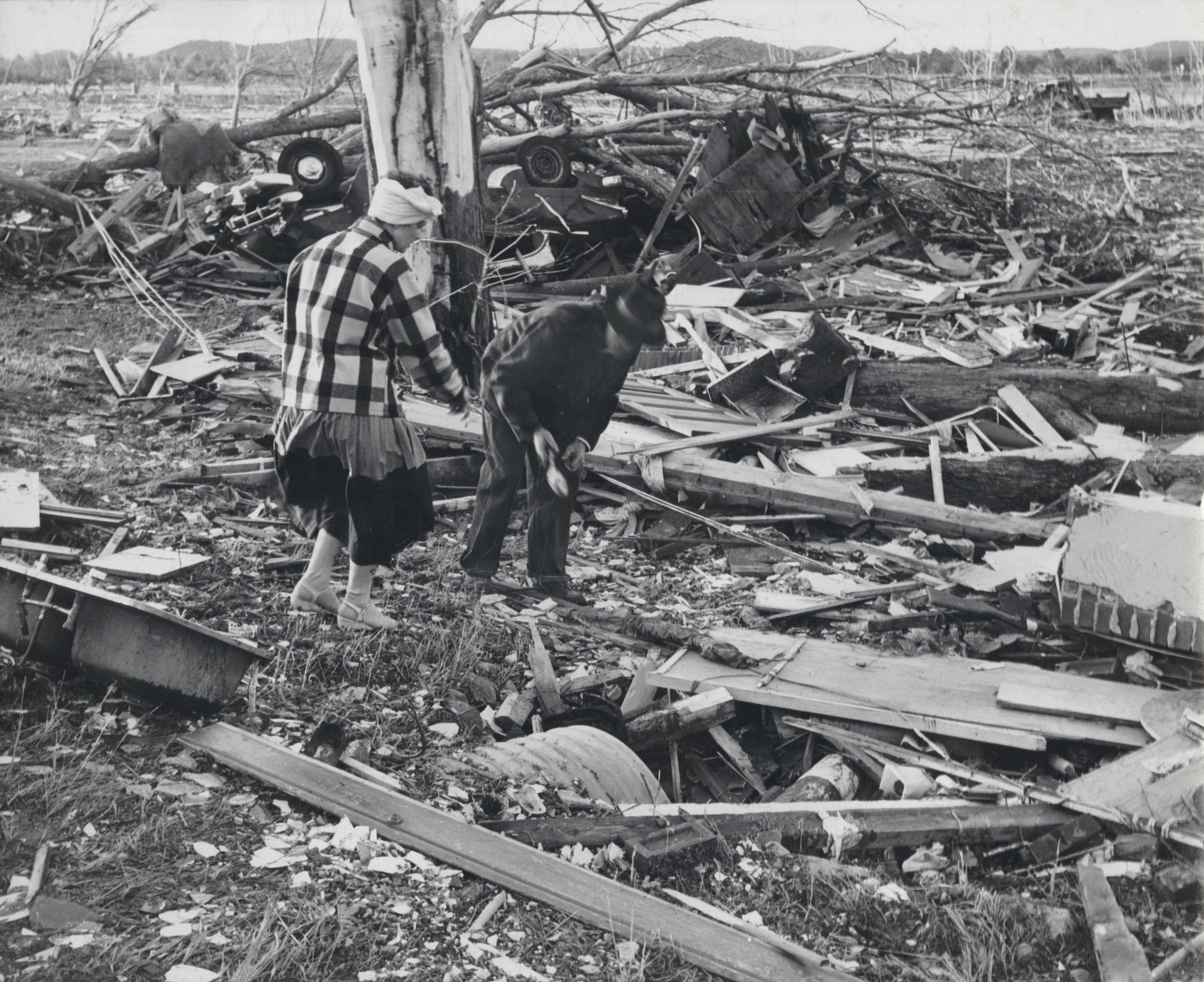
The remains of a home on the north side of Colfax.

== Non-tornadic effects ==
On June 4, 3-to-4-inch-diameter (7.6 to 10.2 cm) hail left accumulations of 2 to 4 inches (51 to 102 mm) southwest of Goehner, Seward County, Nebraska. Straight-line winds in Northwest Wisconsin would cause the death of one person in Rice Lake, Wisconsin.

== Aftermath and recovery ==
The storms, in addition to the fatalities and destruction, also cut utility and communication services through the region thus isolating many communities until help was provided from several areas including from the Twin Cities region about an hour west of the affected areas. Then-Governor of Wisconsin Vernon Thomson ordered three groups of National Guard troops in the affected area for rescue and rehabilitation duties.

== See also ==
- List of tornadoes and tornado outbreaks
  - List of North American tornadoes and tornado outbreaks
- List of F5 and EF5 tornadoes
- 1899 New Richmond tornado – Deadliest tornado on record in Wisconsin
- 1984 Barneveld tornado outbreak – Produced a deadly F5 tornado overnight in Wisconsin

== Sources ==
- Brooks, Harold E. (April 2004). "On the Relationship of Tornado Path Length and Width to Intensity". Weather and Forecasting. 19 (2): 310–19. Bibcode:2004WtFor..19..310B. doi:10.1175/1520-0434(2004)019<0310:OTROTP>2.0.CO;2.
- Cook, A. R.; Schaefer, J. T. (August 2008). "The Relation of El Niño–Southern Oscillation (ENSO) to Winter Tornado Outbreaks". Monthly Weather Review. 136 (8): 3135. Bibcode:2008MWRv..136.3121C. doi:10.1175/2007MWR2171.1.
- Grazulis, Thomas P. (July 1993). Significant Tornadoes 1680–1991: A Chronology and Analysis of Events. St. Johnsbury, Vermont: The Tornado Project of Environmental Films. ISBN 1-879362-03-1.
- Grazulis, Thomas P. (2001a). The Tornado: Nature's Ultimate Windstorm. Norman, Oklahoma: University of Oklahoma Press. ISBN 978-0-8061-3538-0.
- Grazulis, Thomas P. (2001b). F5-F6 Tornadoes. St. Johnsbury, Vermont: The Tornado Project of Environmental Films.
- National Weather Service (June 1958). "Storm Data and Unusual Weather Phenomena". Climatological Data National Summary. 9 (6). Asheville, North Carolina: National Climatic Data Center.
- National Weather Service (June 1958). Storm Data Publication (Report). National Centers for Environmental Information – via Storm Events Database.
- Neal, Lott; Sam McCown; Tom Ross (August 2000) [1999]. 1998-1999 Tornadoes and a Long-Term U.S. Tornado Climatology (PDF) (Technical report). National Climatic Data Center Technical Report. Asheville, North Carolina: National Climatic Data Center. 99-02.
