= Cedar Falls, Wisconsin =

- Unincorporated community
- Location within Wisconsin Location within the United States
- Coordinates: 44°56′09″N 91°53′03″W
- Country: United States
- State: Wisconsin
- County: Dunn
- Town: Red Cedar
- Elevation: 883 ft (269 m)
- Time zone: UTC-6 (Central (CST))
  - Summer (DST): UTC-5 (CDT)
- Area codes: 715 & 534
- GNIS feature ID: 1562842

Cedar Falls is an unincorporated community located in the town of Red Cedar, Dunn County, Wisconsin, United States. Cedar Falls is located along the Red Cedar River, 4.5 miles (7.2 km) north-northeast of Menomonie. The community was directly hit by an F5 tornado in 1958, destroying 96% of the community.
