= Rice Lake (Barron County, Wisconsin) =

Lake in the state of Wisconsin, United States

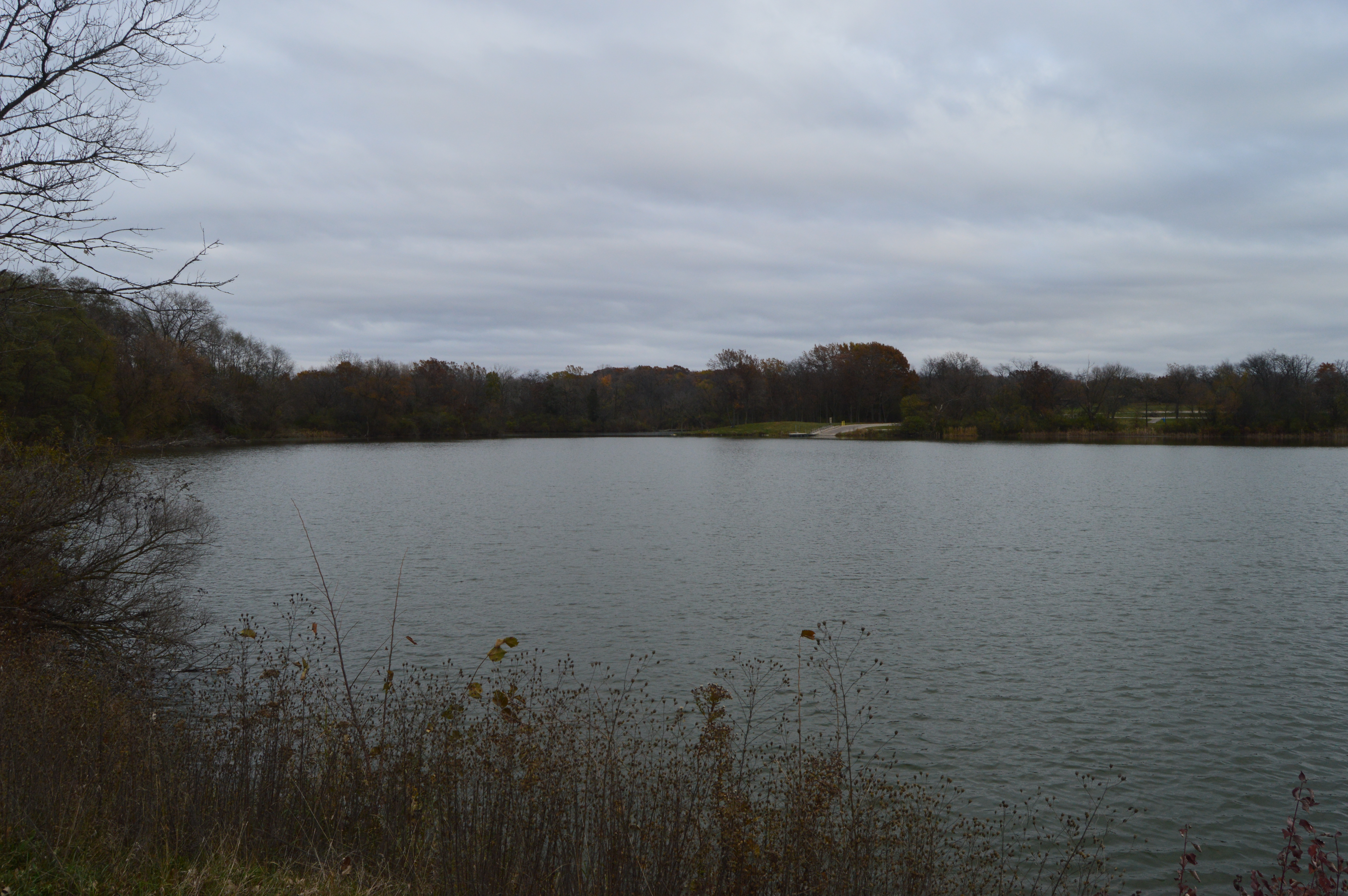

- Location within Wisconsin Location within the United States
- Location: Barron County, Wisconsin
- Coordinates: 45°30′57″N 91°43′42″W
- Type: Lake
- Basin countries: United States
- Surface area: 859 acres (348 ha)
- Max. depth: 19 ft (5.8 m)
- Surface elevation: 1,122 ft (342 m)

Rice Lake is a lake in Barron County, Wisconsin, in the United States. It is one of several lakes that the Red Cedar River flows through. The city of Rice Lake, Wisconsin is beside it. Rice Lake is an 859 acres (348 ha) lake located in Barron County. It has a maximum depth of 19 feet (5.8 m).

== History ==
The lake was named from the wild rice which was abundant there.

== See also ==
- List of lakes in Wisconsin
