= James D. Millar =

American politician (1869–1948)

James David Millar (January 8, 1869 – June 5, 1948) was an American teacher, bookkeeper, businessman, and politician.

Born in Eau Claire, Wisconsin, Millar moved with his parents to a farm in Dunn County, Wisconsin in 1873. He went to Menomonie High School in Menomonie, Wisconsin, and River Falls Normal School (now University of Wisconsin–River Falls). He taught school, was a bookkeeper, and was in the insurance and lumber businesses. Millar also owned a farm. Millar was chairman of the Red Cedar, Wisconsin Town Board and served on the Dunn County Board of Supervisors of which he was chairman of the county board. He was involved with the Dunn County Agricultural Society and the Free Library Commission. Millar served in the Wisconsin State Assembly in 1911, 1913, 1923, 1925, 1927, 1929, 1931, 1935, and 1937 and was a Republican and a Progressive. His father, William Millar, had been a member of the Assembly, as well as the Wisconsin State Senate. Millar died in Menomonie, Wisconsin after a long illness.
