= Colfax, Wisconsin =

- Village
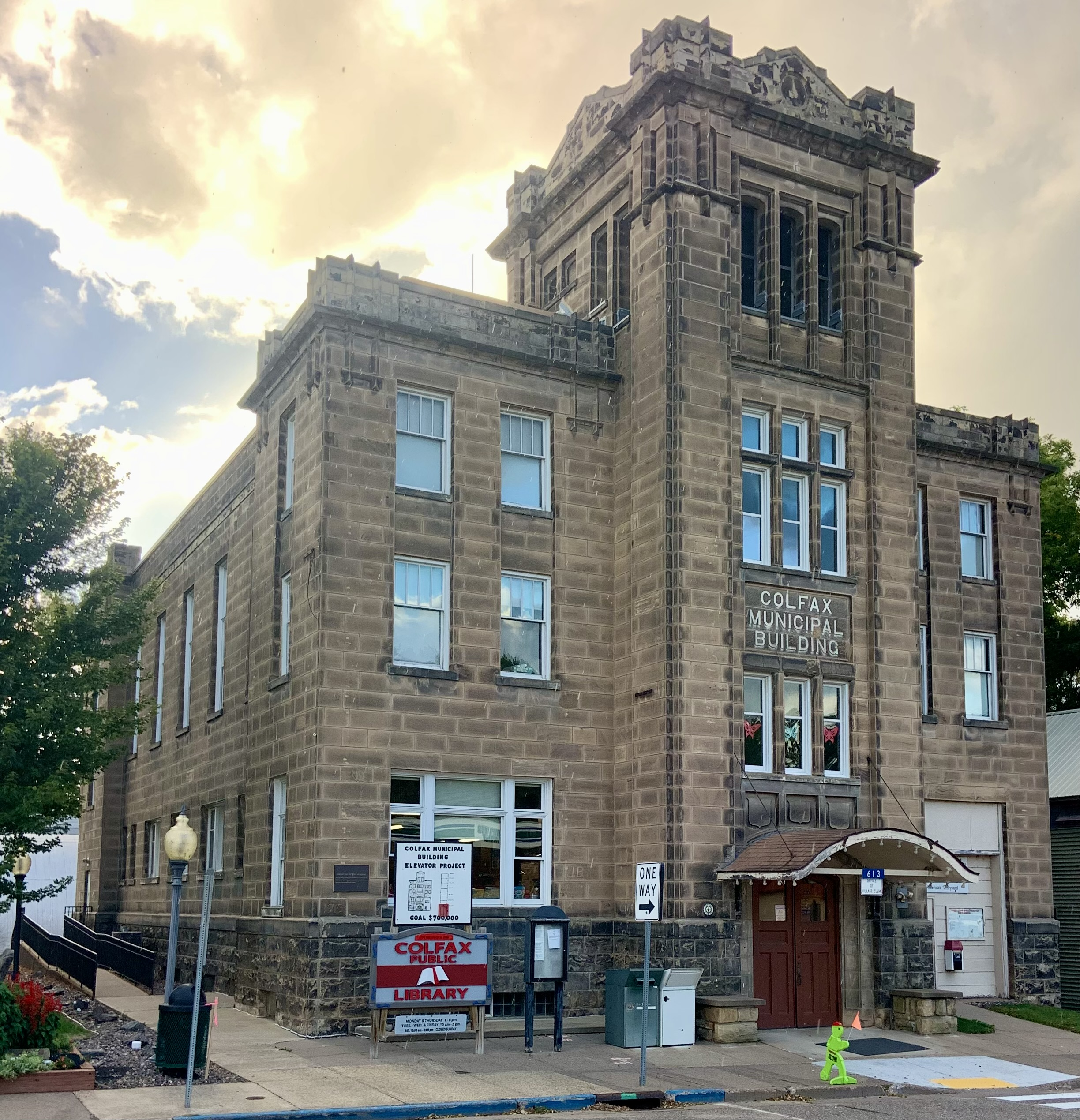
- Village hall

- Location of Colfax in Dunn County, Wisconsin

- Location within the state of Wisconsin Location within the United States Colfax (North America)
- Coordinates: 44°59′55″N 91°42′14″W
- Country: United States
- State: Wisconsin
- County: Dunn

Area
  - Total: 1.42 sq mi (3.67 km^{2})
  - Land: 1.39 sq mi (3.59 km^{2})
  - Water: 0.031 sq mi (0.08 km^{2})
- Elevation: 981 ft (299 m)

Population (2020)
  - Total: 1,182
  - Density: 853/sq mi (329/km^{2})
- Time zone: UTC-6 (Central (CST))
  - Summer (DST): UTC-5 (CDT)
- Area codes: 715 & 534
- FIPS code: 55-16300
- GNIS feature ID: 1583001
- Website: http://www.villageofcolfaxwi.org/

Colfax is a village in Dunn County, Wisconsin, United States. The population was 1,182 at the 2020 census. The village is surrounded by the Town of Colfax.

== History ==
The community was named for Schuyler Colfax, who served as vice president under Ulysses S. Grant. On June 4, 1958, Colfax was struck by a powerful F5 tornado, leaving its southern and northeastern sections heavily damaged or destroyed.

== Geography ==
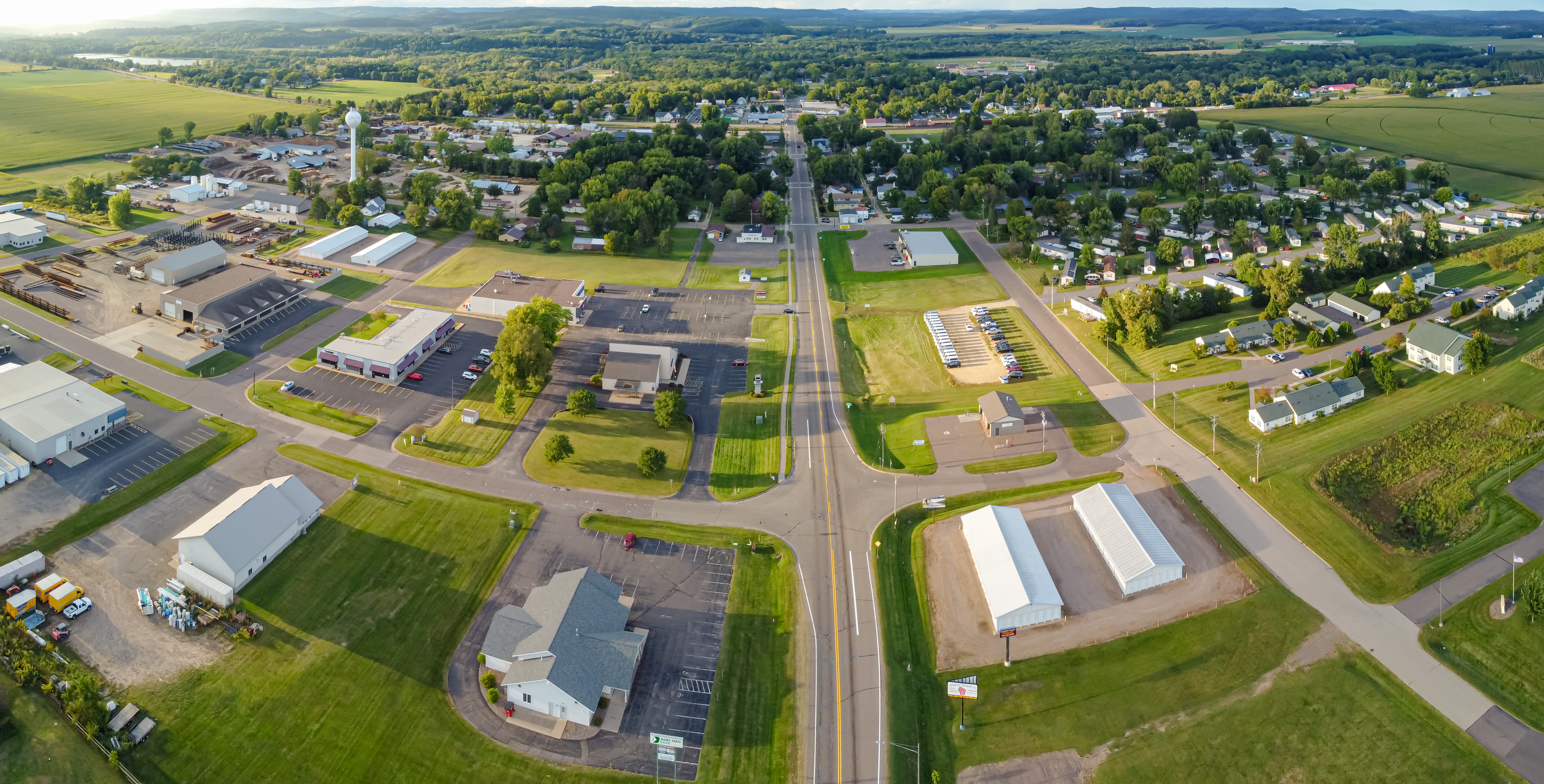

According to the United States Census Bureau, the village has an area of 1.41 square miles (3.65 km^{2}), of which 1.38 square miles (3.57 km^{2}) is land and 0.03 square miles (0.08 km^{2}) is water.

Colfax is along the Red Cedar River.

Wisconsin Highways 40 and 170 are main routes in the community. Other routes include County Roads BB, M, N, and W.

== Demographics ==
Historical population
| Census | Pop. | Note | %± |
|---|---|---|---|
| 1880 | 66 | | — |
| 1910 | 701 | | — |
| 1920 | 905 | | 29.1% |
| 1930 | 919 | | 1.5% |
| 1940 | 992 | | 7.9% |
| 1950 | 1,044 | | 5.2% |
| 1960 | 885 | | −15.2% |
| 1970 | 1,026 | | 15.9% |
| 1980 | 1,149 | | 12.0% |
| 1990 | 1,110 | | −3.4% |
| 2000 | 1,136 | | 2.3% |
| 2010 | 1,158 | | 1.9% |
| 2020 | 1,182 | | 2.1% |
U.S. Decennial Census

=== 2010 census ===
As of the census of 2010, there were 1,158 people, 478 households, and 291 families living in the village. The population density was 839.1 inhabitants per square mile (324.0/km^{2}). There were 524 housing units at an average density of 379.7 per square mile (146.6/km^{2}). The racial makeup of the village was 97.2% White, 0.3% African American, 0.6% Native American, 0.2% from other races, and 1.7% from two or more races. Hispanic or Latino of any race were 1.7% of the population.

There were 478 households, of which 30.8% had children under the age of 18 living with them, 44.1% were married couples living together, 12.3% had a female householder with no husband present, 4.4% had a male householder with no wife present, and 39.1% were non-families. 33.9% of all households were made up of individuals, and 18% had someone living alone who was 65 years of age or older. The average household size was 2.29 and the average family size was 2.93.

The median age in the village was 41.8 years. 24.4% of residents were under the age of 18; 7.3% were between the ages of 18 and 24; 22.4% were from 25 to 44; 24.3% were from 45 to 64; and 21.6% were 65 years of age or older. The gender makeup of the village was 45.6% male and 54.4% female.

=== 2000 census ===
As of the census of 2000, there were 1,136 people, 467 households, and 294 families living in the village. The population density was 817.0 people per square mile (315.5/km^{2}). There were 488 housing units at an average density of 351.0 per square mile (135.6/km^{2}). The racial makeup of the village was 98.59% White, 0.26% Black or African American, 0.18% Native American, 0.26% from other races, and 0.70% from two or more races. 1.32% of the population were Hispanic or Latino of any race.

There were 467 households, out of which 30.8% had children under the age of 18 living with them, 51.2% were married couples living together, 9.4% had a female householder with no husband present, and 37.0% were non-families. 32.8% of all households were made up of individuals, and 18.2% had someone living alone who was 65 years of age or older. The average household size was 2.31 and the average family size was 2.92.

In the village, the population was spread out, with 24.2% under the age of 18, 6.3% from 18 to 24, 25.6% from 25 to 44, 20.6% from 45 to 64, and 23.2% who were 65 years of age or older. The median age was 40 years. For every 100 females, there were 87.5 males. For every 100 females age 18 and over, there were 85.2 males.

The median income for a household in the village was $31,118, and the median income for a family was $40,673. Males had a median income of $30,833 versus $21,741 for females. The per capita income for the village was $15,040. About 2.7% of families and 5.4% of the population were below the poverty line, including none of those under age 18 and 15.3% of those age 65 or over.

== Arts and culture ==
The Colfax Railroad Museum is in Colfax.

The Red Cedar Sounds, a chapter of Sweet Adelines International, is based in Colfax.

== Education ==
Colfax schools include Colfax Elementary School, Colfax Middle School, and Colfax High School.

== Media ==
The Colfax Messenger, founded in 1897, is published weekly on Wednesdays.

== Notable people ==
- Rebecca Cooke, politician
- The Silver Heart Club, power pop and rock band
