= 9th Illinois Cavalry Regiment =

9th Illinois Cavalry Regiment "Brackett's Regiment"
- Illinois flag
- Active: November 30, 1861, to October 31, 1865
- Country: United States
- Allegiance: Union
- Branch: Cavalry
- Engagements: Battle of Nashville

The 9th Illinois Cavalry Regiment was a cavalry regiment that served in the Union Army during the American Civil War.

== Service ==
The 9th Illinois Cavalry was mustered into service at Chicago, Illinois, on November 30, 1861.

The regiment was mustered out on October 31, 1865, at Selma, Alabama.

Future governor of Minnesota Samuel Rinnah Van Sant served in the regiment, as did future Nebraska governor Albinus Nance and future Wisconsin legislator Stewart J. Bailey.

== Total strength and casualties ==
One officer and 45 enlisted men were killed in action or died of their wounds, and 6 officers and 241 enlisted men who died of disease, for a total of 293 fatalities.

== Commanders ==
- Colonel Albert G. Brackett - mustered out on October 26, 1864
- Colonel Joseph W. Harper - mustered out with the regiment.

== See also ==
- 9th Illinois Mounted Infantry regiment
- List of Illinois Civil War Units
- Illinois in the American Civil War
