= Colfax (town), Wisconsin =

Town in Wisconsin, United States

Colfax, Wisconsin
- Town
- Town of Colfax
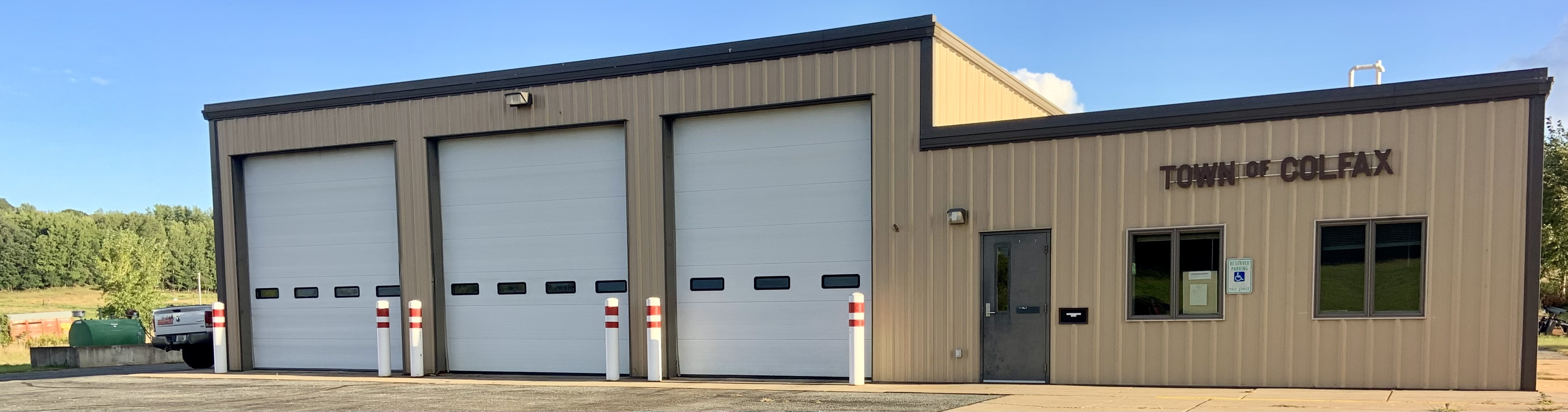
- Colfax Town Hall

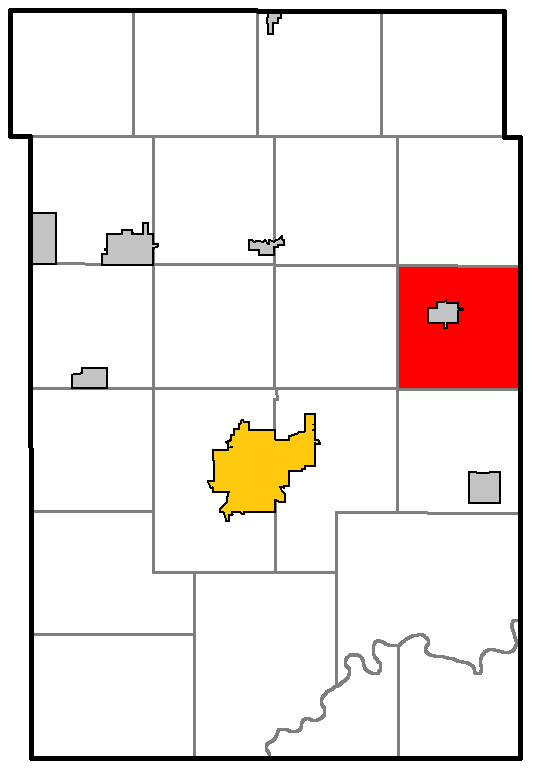
- Location of Colfax, within Dunn County
- Coordinates: 44°59′17″N 91°42′30″W
- Country: United States
- State: Wisconsin
- County: Dunn

Area
  - Total: 34.44 sq mi (89.2 km^{2})
  - Land: 34.11 sq mi (88.3 km^{2})
  - Water: 0.33 sq mi (0.85 km^{2})

Population (2020)
  - Total: 1,230
  - Density: 36.1/sq mi (13.9/km^{2})
- Time zone: UTC-6 (Central (CST))
  - Summer (DST): UTC-5 (CDT)
- Area code(s): 715 and 534
- GNIS feature ID: 1583002

Colfax is a town in Dunn County, Wisconsin, United States. The population was 1,230 at the 2020 census.

== Geography ==
According to the United States Census Bureau, the town has a total area of 34.6 square miles (89.5 km^{2}), of which 34.2 square miles (88.7 km^{2}) is land and 0.3 square mile (0.8 km^{2}) (0.93%) is water.

== Demographics ==
Historical population
Census	Pop.	Note	%±
1990	691		—
2000	909		31.5%
2010	1,186		30.5%
2020	1,230		3.7%

As of the census of 2000, there were 909 people, 318 households, and 254 families residing in the town. The population density was 26.5 people per square mile (10.3/km^{2}). There were 327 housing units at an average density of 9.6 per square mile (3.7/km^{2}). The racial makeup of the town was 99.45% White, 0.22% Native American and 0.33% Asian. Hispanic or Latino of any race were 0.11% of the population.

There were 318 households, out of which 38.7% had children under the age of 18 living with them, 70.4% were married couples living together, 5.0% had a female householder with no husband present, and 20.1% were non-families. 14.2% of all households were made up of individuals, and 4.7% had someone living alone who was 65 years of age or older. The average household size was 2.86 and the average family size was 3.15.

In the town, the population was spread out, with 28.6% under the age of 18, 8.1% from 18 to 24, 32.0% from 25 to 44, 22.7% from 45 to 64, and 8.6% who were 65 years of age or older. The median age was 35 years. For every 100 females, there were 106.6 males. For every 100 females age 18 and over, there were 112.8 males.

The median income for a household in the town was $46,111, and the median income for a family was $48,542. Males had a median income of $30,288 versus $20,469 for females. The per capita income for the town was $17,364. About 4.7% of families and 6.1% of the population were below the poverty line, including 8.3% of those under age 18 and 3.2% of those age 65 or over.

== History ==
At least 28 people were killed by an F5 tornado that struck the Colfax area on June 4, 1958.

== Notable people ==
- Ole G. Kinney, Wisconsin legislator and businessman, lived in the town; Kinney served as chairman of the Colfax Town Board
