= Rusk, Dunn County, Wisconsin =

Rusk, Wisconsin
- Unincorporated community
- Location within Wisconsin Location within the United States
- Coordinates: 44°54′28″N 91°50′03″W
- Country: United States
- State: Wisconsin
- County: Dunn
- Town: Red Cedar
- Elevation: 899 ft (274 m)
- Time zone: UTC-6 (Central (CST))
  - Summer (DST): UTC-5 (CDT)
- Area codes: 715 & 534
- GNIS feature ID: 1572746

Rusk is an unincorporated community located in the town of Red Cedar, Dunn County, Wisconsin, United States. Rusk is located along Interstate 94, 5 miles (8.0 km) east-northeast of Menomonie. The community was originally named Gates after Milwaukee entrepreneur John L. Gates. In 1905, its name was changed to Rusk after Wisconsin governor Jeremiah M. Rusk.
