= Tainter Lake =

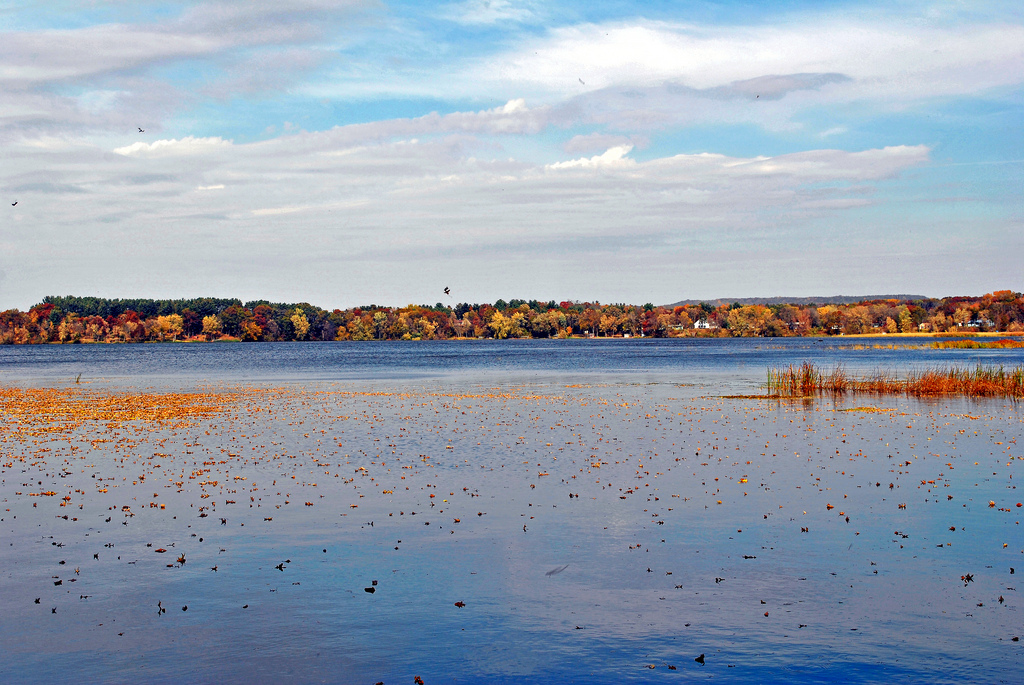

- Location within Wisconsin
- Location: Dunn County, Wisconsin
- Coordinates: 44°56′06″N 91°53′19″W
- Type: Reservoir
- Primary inflows: Red Cedar River, Hay River
- Primary outflows: Red Cedar River
- Basin countries: United States
- Surface area: 1,752 acres (7.1 km^{2})
- Max. depth: 37 ft (11 m)
- Shore length^{1}: 25.7 mi (41.4 km)
- Surface elevation: 872 ft (266 m)
- Settlements: Tainter
- ^{1} Shore length is not a well-defined measure.

Tainter Lake is a small reservoir in north central Dunn County, Wisconsin, on the Red Cedar River at its confluence with the Hay River. The lake was created by a hydroelectric dam (about 3 miles (5 km) downstream on the Red Cedar at Cedar Falls. The lake, a popular resort and fishing spot, has a surface area of approximately 2 square miles (5 km^{2}).

== History ==
Before the installation of the dam at Cedar Falls (Kakabika Falls), Tainter Lake did not exist. The decision to build the mill and dam came from Andrew Tainter (1823 - 1899), a wealthy lumber baron who was a partner in Knapp, Stout and Company, the largest lumber mill in the country during the 1870s. It was reported that they owned 115,000 acres (470 km^{2}) of pine land and employed 1,200 men. By that time the company had logging camps on nearly every stream leading to the Red Cedar and controlled almost all of the Red Cedar River and its tributaries. The company's largest mill operation was on the Menomonee River (what the Red Cedar was commonly called) where the lumber settlement became known as the "mills of Menomonie" or "Menomonie Mills" and finally Menomonie, now the county seat of Dunn. The firm continued to log until 1899 when the forests were exhausted and competition keen. The mill at Cedar Falls closed in 1901.

During those productive years of logging, acres of forest land near and next to the Red Cedar River were cleared. While the company owned a number of farms to provide food and meat for the loggers, pioneer farmers also moved to the area, removed stumps and began farming. Most of the newly created farm land sloped, or had access, to the river as it had been so efficient for logging. Decades later this same watershed, and the farming industry, would mean trouble for Tainter Lake. Vegetation maps of the mid-1880s show that the area was 90% forest and 10% native grasses. Maps of the early 1980s indicate that the basin area is less than 50% forest and 40% agricultural land. These are the historical issues that affect the area today, contributing to the excessive algae in Lake Tainter.

== Geography ==
Tainter Lake is located in the Town of Tainter in northern Dunn County, Wisconsin. A small channel divides the lake into North and South regions. the channel creates some of the narrowest parts of the lake (50 ft) and also contains the deepest part of the lake (35 ft). The average depth of the lake is 20 feet (6.1 m).

A few very small resorts are situated on the shores, although the lake is not known for its large fish populations. North Tainter is better known for its fishing than the southern part. This is because the north has multiple fish cribs that were planted over the last 20 years, is significantly shallower than the southern part of the lake, and has many species of fish that spawn in the shallow slow moving water.

North Tainter Lake is fed primarily by the Red Cedar River, but also by the Hay River. Both rivers drain the farm fields north of Lake Tainter. The TMLIA (Tainter Menomin Lake Improvement Association) has been diligently working on an algae problem for the last several years. With their increased participation; hopefully the lake will continue to see some improvement. The Red Cedar River south of the Cedar Falls dam creates flows for about three miles (5 km) until it reaches Lake Menomin, which was also created by a dam on the Red Cedar. Because the Lake Menomin dam is the last one on the Red Cedar River before the Mississippi, it is legal to fish that part of the river out of season.

== Fishing ==
Common species of fish in Tainter Lake include walleye, black crappie, and bluegill. Somewhat common species include yellow perch, northern pike, common carp, white bass, and bowfin. Water quality is an issue for fishing in August; as algae blooms can decrease water visibility. Walleye are heavily pressured by fishermen year round and have an average length of less than 15 inches. Walleye from 20 inches to 24 inches cannot be kept.

== Cedar Falls hydroelectric project ==
Xcel Energy operates the Cedar Falls Hydroelectric Project, which impounds Tainter Lake. The project consists of a 510 feet (155.4 m) long 50 feet (15.2 m) high dam located near Cedar Falls, Wisconsin. Its powerhouse contains three 2,000 kW electrical generators with a total capacity of 7.1 MW. The facility can produce over 33.6 million kilowatt hours of electricity each year. It is a modified run-of-the-river hydroelectricity project. The Cedar Falls dam was originally a timber dam and was replaced with a concrete dam in 1910. New generators were added in 1912 and 1915 and the project has changed little since that time. In 2005 the dam's gates were upgraded to include Obermeyer spillway gates with inflatable rubber bladders that allow more consistent water levels on the lake through the year. Before the installation of the inflatable gates, the dam featured gates made of plywood that were designed to break as the ice melted. During the installation of the inflatable gates the water level of the lake dropped about 5 or 6 feet (1.8 m). This caused the water to erode some of the land that people put their docks on. When the water level returned to normal residents living on the lake with docks had to shorten the length of their dock because the water had become significantly deeper.
