= New Haven, Dunn County, Wisconsin =

New Haven, Wisconsin
- Town
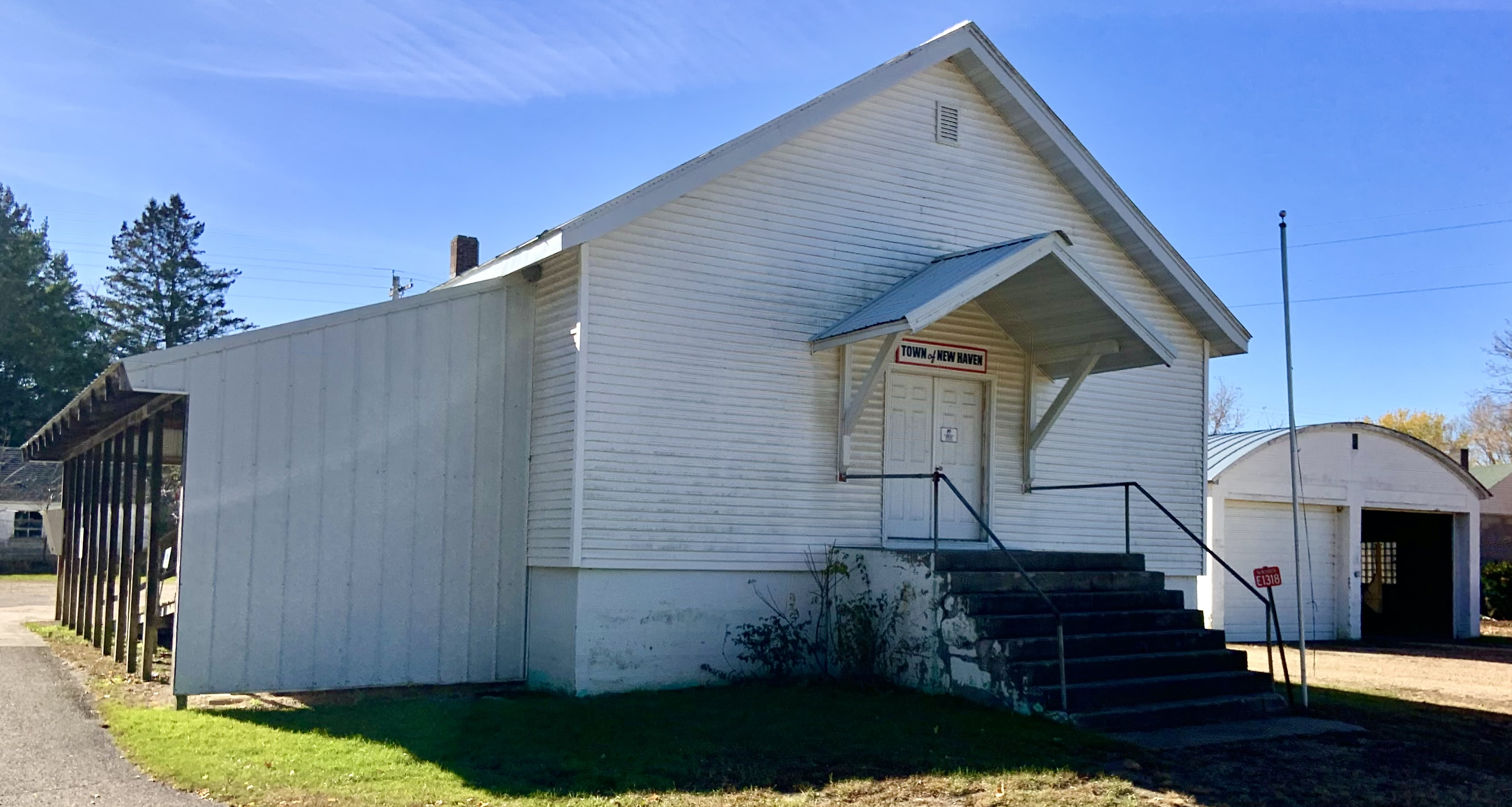
- Town hall

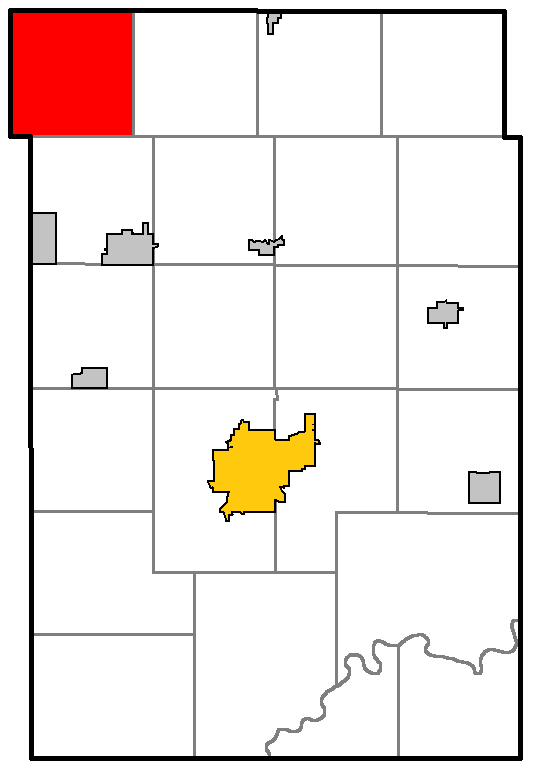
- Location of New Haven, within Dunn County

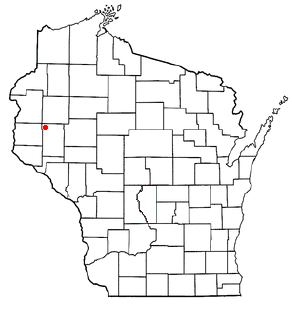
- Location of New Haven, Wisconsin
- Coordinates: 45°9′31″N 92°6′41″W
- Country: United States
- State: Wisconsin
- County: Dunn

Area
  - Total: 36.4 sq mi (94.2 km^{2})
  - Land: 36.4 sq mi (94.2 km^{2})
  - Water: 0 sq mi (0.0 km^{2})
- Elevation: 1,007 ft (307 m)

Population (2020)
  - Total: 673
  - Density: 18.5/sq mi (7.14/km^{2})
- Time zone: UTC-6 (Central (CST))
  - Summer (DST): UTC-5 (CDT)
- Area codes: 715 & 534
- FIPS code: 55-56775
- GNIS feature ID: 1583808
- Website: https://townofnewhavendunnwi.gov/

New Haven is a town in Dunn County, Wisconsin, United States. As of the 2020 census, the town population was 673. The unincorporated community of Connorsville is located within the town. The unincorporated community of Graytown is located partially in the town.

== Geography ==
According to the United States Census Bureau, the town has a total area of 36.4 square miles (94.2 km^{2}), all land.

== Demographics ==
Historical population
Census	Pop.	Note	%±
1990	658		—
2000	656		−0.3%
2010	677		3.2%
2020 (est.)	696		2.8%

As of the census of 2000, there were 656 people, 243 households, and 170 families residing in the town. The population density was 18.0 people per square mile (7.0/km^{2}). There were 256 housing units at an average density of 7.0 per square mile (2.7/km^{2}). The racial makeup of the town was 99.09% White, 0.30% Native American, 0.15% Asian, 0.15% from other races, and 0.30% from two or more races.

There were 243 households, out of which 36.6% had children under the age of 18 living with them, 62.6% were married couples living together, 4.1% had a female householder with no husband present, and 30.0% were non-families. 24.7% of all households were made up of individuals, and 12.3% had someone living alone who was 65 years of age or older. The average household size was 2.70 and the average family size was 3.28.

In the town, the population was spread out, with 29.1% under the age of 18, 8.5% from 18 to 24, 27.1% from 25 to 44, 22.4% from 45 to 64, and 12.8% who were 65 years of age or older. The median age was 37 years. For every 100 females, there were 100.6 males. For every 100 females age 18 and over, there were 105.8 males.

The median income for a household in the town was $40,938, and the median income for a family was $48,021. Males had a median income of $30,469 versus $21,944 for females. The per capita income for the town was $19,019. About 2.2% of families and 5.0% of the population were below the poverty line, including 5.7% of those under age 18 and 7.8% of those age 65 or over.

== Notable people ==
- William E. Owen, farmer and politician, was born in the town
- Andy Pafko, major league baseball player, grew up on a farm near Connorsville in the Town of New Haven
