= Red Cedar, Wisconsin =

- Town
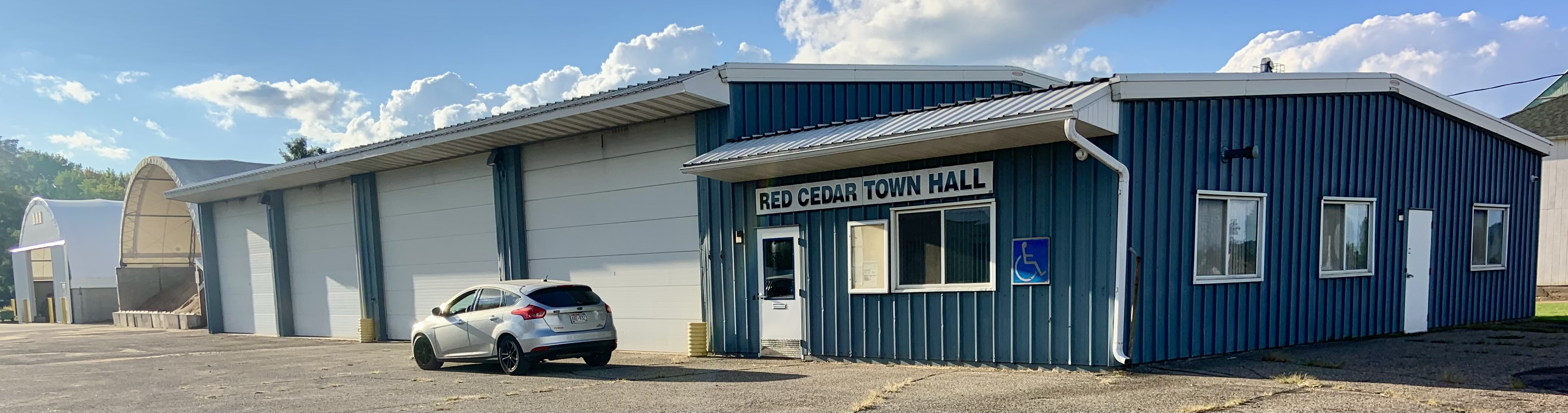
- Town hall

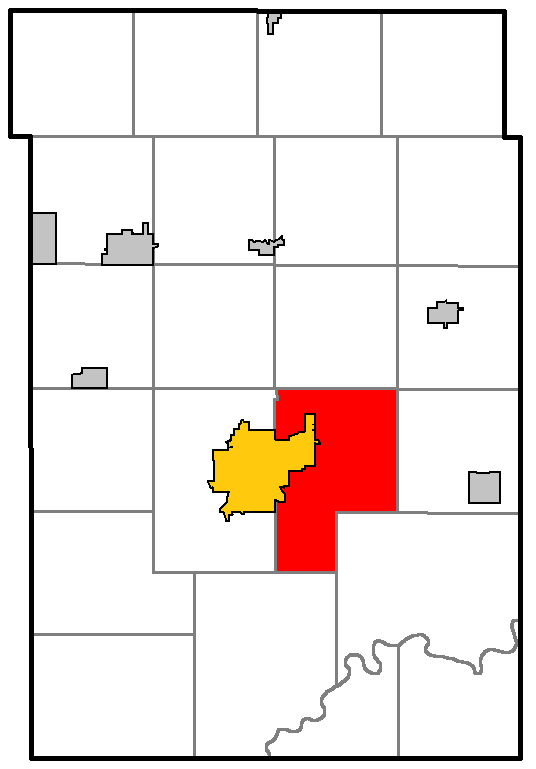
- Location of Red Cedar, within Dunn County

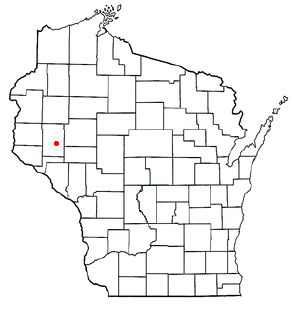
- Location of Red Cedar, Wisconsin
- Coordinates: 44°53′28″N 91°50′40″W
- Country: United States
- State: Wisconsin
- County: Dunn

Area
  - Total: 40.7 sq mi (105.4 km^{2})
  - Land: 39.8 sq mi (103.0 km^{2})
  - Water: 0.93 sq mi (2.4 km^{2})
- Elevation: 889 ft (271 m)

Population (2020)
  - Total: 2,359
  - Density: 59.32/sq mi (22.90/km^{2})
- Time zone: UTC-6 (Central (CST))
  - Summer (DST): UTC-5 (CDT)
- Area codes: 715 & 534
- FIPS code: 55-66550
- GNIS feature ID: 1584001
- Website: https://redcedar.gov/

Red Cedar is a town in Dunn County, Wisconsin, United States. The population was 2,359 at the 2020 census. The unincorporated communities of Cedar Falls and Rusk are located in the town.

== Geography ==
According to the United States Census Bureau, the town has a total area of 40.7 square miles (105.4 km^{2}), of which 39.8 square miles (103.0 km^{2}) is land and 0.9 square mile (2.4 km^{2}) (2.31%) is water.

== Demographics ==
Historical population
Census	Pop.	Note	%±
1990	1,417		—
2000	1,673		18.1%
2010	2,086		24.7%
2020	2,359		13.1%

As of the census of 2000, there were 1,673 people, 593 households, and 479 families residing in the town. The population density was 42.1 people per square mile (16.2/km^{2}). There were 624 housing units at an average density of 15.7 per square mile (6.1/km^{2}). The racial makeup of the town was 97.85% White, 0.12% Native American, 1.02% Asian, 0.36% from other races, and 0.66% from two or more races. Hispanic or Latino of any race were 0.54% of the population.

There were 593 households, out of which 40.1% had children under the age of 18 living with them, 72.5% were married couples living together, 5.4% had a female householder with no husband present, and 19.1% were non-families. 15.5% of all households were made up of individuals, and 4.7% had someone living alone who was 65 years of age or older. The average household size was 2.82 and the average family size was 3.12.

In the town, the population was spread out, with 28.6% under the age of 18, 7.4% from 18 to 24, 29.8% from 25 to 44, 24.4% from 45 to 64, and 9.7% who were 65 years of age or older. The median age was 36 years. For every 100 females, there were 100.8 males. For every 100 females age 18 and over, there were 102.4 males.

The median income for a household in the town was $50,972, and the median income for a family was $53,382. Males had a median income of $37,266 versus $22,569 for females. The per capita income for the town was $21,067. About 1.0% of families and 3.5% of the population were below the poverty line, including 1.3% of those under age 18 and 7.6% of those age 65 or over.

== Notable people ==
- James D. Millar, farmer, businessman, and Wisconsin State Representative, lived on a farm in the town; he served as chairman of the town board
- William Millar, farmer and Wisconsin State Representative and Senator, lived in the town
- Mason Platter, Played Outside Linebacker for the Wisconsin Badgers, Grew up in the town
