= Levi F. Martin =

American politician from Wisconsin

Levi F. Martin (1843–1909) was a Democratic member of the Wisconsin State Senate. He was born on April 3, 1843, in Danby, New York. He married Julia Girard (1843-1891). The couple moved to Wisconsin and lived in Chippewa Falls. They had a son Frank in 1874 and Harry in 1875. After his retirement he spent the last five years with his son Harry in Walla Walla, Washington, where he died on September 29, 1909. He is buried in Chippewa Falls.
