= Hay River (Wisconsin) =

River in Wisconsin, U.S.

Coordinates: 45.00802°N 91.84990°W

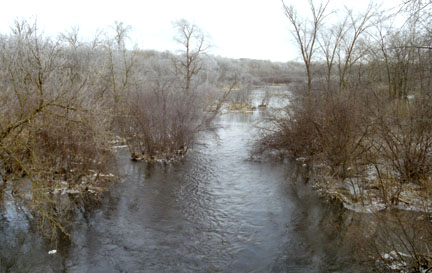
The Hay River near Almena in Barron County during a period of high water in 1996

The Hay River is a tributary of the Red Cedar River in northwestern Wisconsin in the United States. It is about 50 mi (80 km) long. Via the Red Cedar and Chippewa Rivers, it is part of the Mississippi River watershed.

== Course ==
The Hay River begins at the city of Cumberland in Barron County, where it flows from Beaver Dam Lake. It flows generally southwardly through western Barron and northern Dunn Counties, past the villages of Prairie Farm and Wheeler. It joins the Red Cedar River in Dunn County as part of Tainter Lake at a settlement of the same name.

Upstream of Wheeler, the river collects the South Fork Hay River, which rises in southeastern Polk County and flows south-southeastwardly, past the community of Connorsville.

== See also ==
- List of Wisconsin rivers
