= Wheeler, Wisconsin =

- Village
- Location of Wheeler in Dunn County, Wisconsin

- Location within the state of Wisconsin Location within the United States Wheeler (North America)
- Coordinates: 45°2′37″N 91°54′25″W
- Country: United States
- State: Wisconsin
- County: Dunn

Area
  - Total: 0.87 sq mi (2.25 km^{2})
  - Land: 0.82 sq mi (2.13 km^{2})
  - Water: 0.046 sq mi (0.12 km^{2})
- Elevation: 942 ft (287 m)

Population (2020)
  - Total: 326
  - Density: 396/sq mi (153/km^{2})
- Time zone: UTC-6 (Central (CST))
  - Summer (DST): UTC-5 (CDT)
- Area codes: 715 & 534
- FIPS code: 55-86575
- GNIS feature ID: 1576602
- Website: https://villageofwheelerwi.com/

Wheeler is a village in Dunn County, Wisconsin, United States, along the Hay River. The population was 326 at the 2020 census.

== History ==
The town is named after H. D. Wheeler, its first postmaster. The settlement had previously been called Lochiel, and later Welton, in honor of Maria L. Welton, who had set up a homestead in the area.

== Geography ==
According to the United States Census Bureau, the village has a total area of 0.82 square miles (2.12 km^{2}), of which 0.79 square miles (2.05 km^{2}) is land and 0.03 square miles (0.08 km^{2}) is water.

Wheeler is located at 45°2′37″N 91°54′25″W (45.043728, -91.906841).

Wisconsin Highways 25 and 170 are the main routes in the community.

== Demographics ==
Historical population
Census	Pop.	Note	%±
1930	229		—
1940	272		18.8%
1950	235		−13.6%
1960	227		−3.4%
1970	212		−6.6%
1980	231		9.0%
1990	348		50.6%
2000	317		−8.9%
2010	348		9.8%
2020	326		−6.3%
U.S. Decennial Census

=== 2010 census ===
As of the census of 2010, there were 348 people, 127 households, and 79 families living in the village. The population density was 440.5 inhabitants per square mile (170.1/km^{2}). There were 147 housing units at an average density of 186.1 per square mile (71.9/km^{2}). The racial makeup of the village was 96.3% White, 1.7% African American, 0.3% from other races, and 1.7% from two or more races. Hispanic or Latino of any race were 1.4% of the population.

There were 127 households, of which 35.4% had children under the age of 18 living with them, 37.8% were married couples living together, 16.5% had a female householder with no husband present, 7.9% had a male householder with no wife present, and 37.8% were non-families. 25.2% of all households were made up of individuals, and 12.6% had someone living alone who was 65 years of age or older. The average household size was 2.74 and the average family size was 3.32.

The median age in the village was 34.3 years. 29% of residents were under the age of 18; 9% were between the ages of 18 and 24; 29.8% were from 25 to 44; 21% were from 45 to 64; and 11.2% were 65 years of age or older. The gender makeup of the village was 50.6% male and 49.4% female.

=== 2000 census ===
As of the census of 2000, there were 317 people, 134 households, and 79 families living in the village. The population density was 386.8 people per square mile (149.3/km^{2}). There were 142 housing units at an average density of 173.3 per square mile (66.9/km^{2}). The racial makeup of the village was 98.42% White, 1.26% Native American, and 0.32% from two or more races. Hispanic or Latino of any race were 0.95% of the population.

There were 134 households, out of which 28.4% had children under the age of 18 living with them, 41.0% were married couples living together, 9.7% had a female householder with no husband present, and 41.0% were non-families. 32.8% of all households were made up of individuals, and 14.9% had someone living alone who was 65 years of age or older. The average household size was 2.37 and the average family size was 2.94.

In the village, the population was spread out, with 24.0% under the age of 18, 7.6% from 18 to 24, 33.1% from 25 to 44, 19.9% from 45 to 64, and 15.5% who were 65 years of age or older. The median age was 36 years. For every 100 females, there were 111.3 males. For every 100 females age 18 and over, there were 104.2 males.

The median income for a household in the village was $25,938, and the median income for a family was $43,000. Males had a median income of $29,500 versus $23,333 for females. The per capita income for the village was $20,883. About 13.2% of families and 15.6% of the population were below the poverty line, including 11.3% of those under age 18 and 18.6% of those age 65 or over.
