= Stewart J. Bailey =

American politician

Stewart J. Bailey was a member of the Wisconsin State Assembly.

== Biography ==
Bailey was born on February 13, 1838, reports have differed on the location. During the American Civil War, he served with the 9th Regiment Illinois Volunteer Cavalry of the Union Army. Additionally, he would serve in what is now the Wisconsin Army National Guard. Bailey died on June 28, 1910, in Menomonie, Wisconsin.

== Political career ==
Bailey was elected to the Assembly in 1888. Previously, he was a member of the city council of Menomonie from 1884 to 1886. He was a Republican.
