= Tainter, Wisconsin =

Town of Tainter
- Town
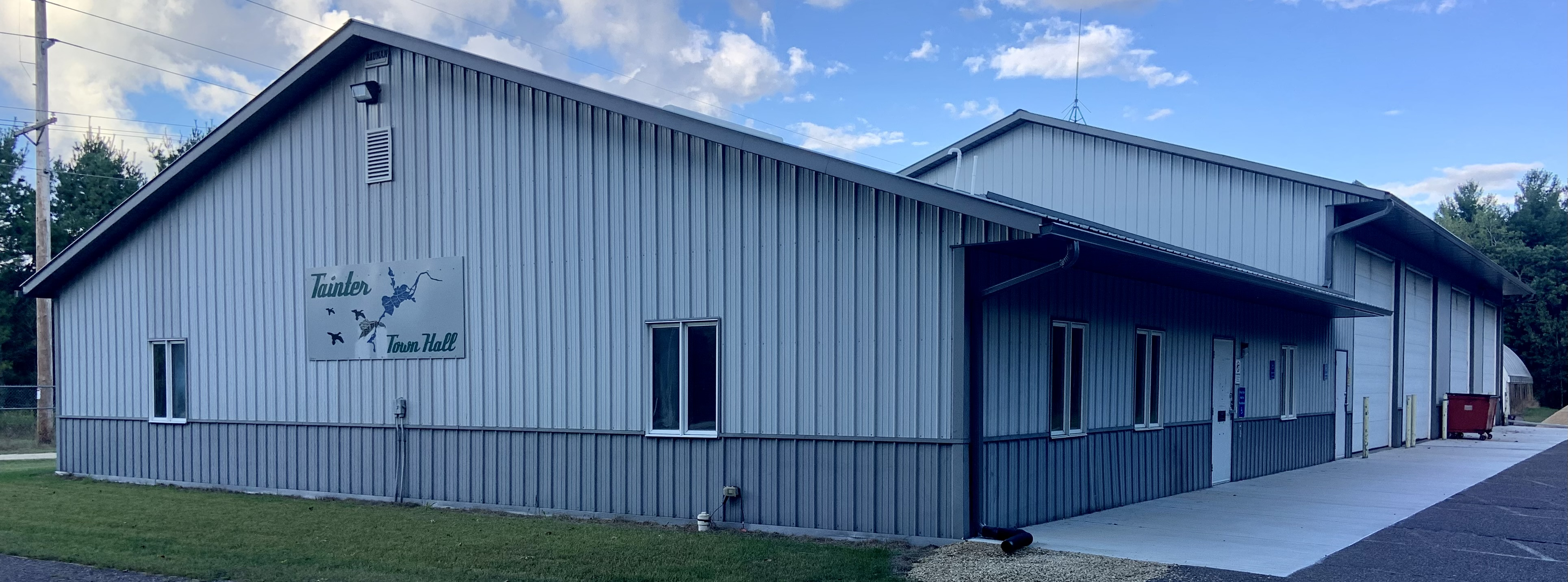
- Town hall

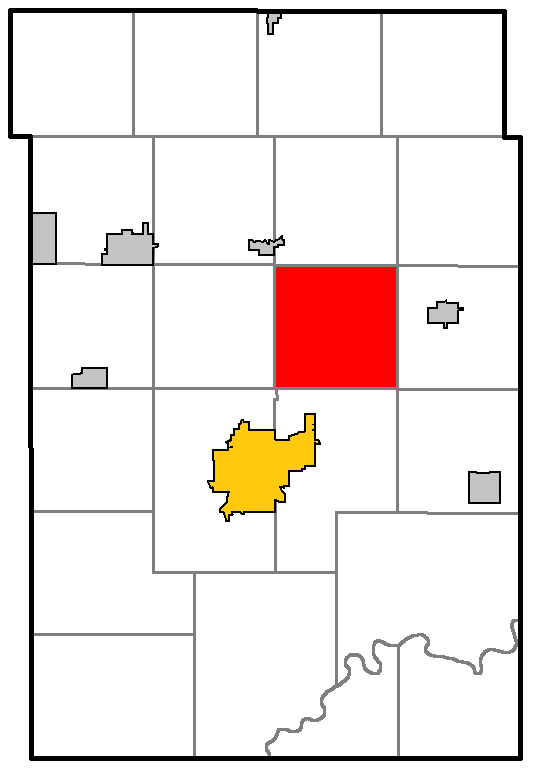
- Location of Tainter within Dunn County

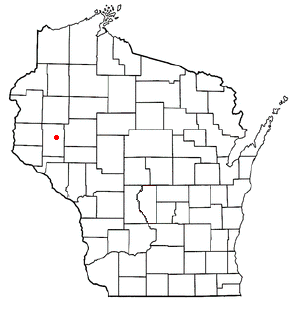
- Location of the Town of Tainter
- Coordinates: 44°59′32″N 91°50′48″W
- Country: United States
- State: Wisconsin
- County: Dunn
- Seat: Tainter Town Hall, N8150 County Rd D, Colfax, WI 54730

Government
  - Type: Town Board

Area
  - Total: 35.7 sq mi (92.4 km^{2})
  - Land: 33.0 sq mi (85.5 km^{2})
  - Water: 2.7 sq mi (6.9 km^{2})
- Elevation: 889 ft (271 m)

Population (2020)
  - Total: 2,643
  - Density: 80.1/sq mi (30.9/km^{2})
- Time zone: UTC-6 (Central (CST))
  - Summer (DST): UTC-5 (CDT)
- Area codes: 715 & 534
- FIPS code: 55-78975
- GNIS feature ID: 1584266
- Website: www.townoftainter.org

The Town of Tainter is a town in Dunn County, Wisconsin, United States. The population was 2,643 at the 2020 census. Part of the census-designated place of Tainter Lake is located in the town. The unincorporated community of Norton is also located in the town.

== Geography ==
According to the United States Census Bureau, the town has a total area of 35.7 square miles (92.4 km^{2}), of which 33.0 square miles (85.5 km^{2}) is land and 2.7 square miles (6.9 km^{2}) (7.51%) is water.

== Demographics ==
Historical population
Census	Pop.	Note	%±
1990	1,756		—
2000	2,116		20.5%
2010	2,319		9.6%
2020	2,643		14.0%
U.S. Decennial Census

As of the census of 2000, there were 2,116 people, 845 households, and 632 families residing in the town. The population density was 64.1 people per square mile (24.8/km^{2}). There were 993 housing units at an average density of 30.1 per square mile (11.6/km^{2}). The racial makeup of the town was 98.72% White, 0.05% African American, 0.09% Native American, 0.28% Asian, 0.33% from other races, and 0.52% from two or more races. Hispanic or Latino of any race were 0.38% of the population.

There were 845 households, out of which 31.1% had children under the age of 18 living with them, 66.2% were married couples living together, 4.9% had a female householder with no husband present, and 25.2% were non-families. 19.3% of all households were made up of individuals, and 5.7% had someone living alone who was 65 years of age or older. The average household size was 2.50 and the average family size was 2.87.

In the town, the population was spread out, with 23.8% under the age of 18, 7.5% from 18 to 24, 27.9% from 25 to 44, 30.2% from 45 to 64, and 10.7% who were 65 years of age or older. The median age was 40 years. For every 100 females, there were 111.6 males. For every 100 females age 18 and over, there were 112.5 males.

The median income for a household in the town was $50,741, and the median income for a family was $57,125. Males had a median income of $38,750 versus $24,554 for females. The per capita income for the town was $22,916. About 4.2% of families and 5.9% of the population were below the poverty line, including 10.1% of those under age 18 and 6.4% of those age 65 or over.
