= Connorsville, Wisconsin =

- Unincorporated community
- Location within the state of Wisconsin
- Coordinates: 45°8′21″N 92°6′16″W
- Country: United States
- State: Wisconsin
- County: Dunn
- Town: New Haven
- Time zone: UTC-6 (Central (CST))
  - Summer (DST): UTC-5 (CDT)
- Area codes: 715 & 534

Connorsville is an unincorporated community in Dunn County, Wisconsin, United States, located along the South Fork of the Hay River in the town of New Haven.

Andy Pafko, major league baseball player, began his career with Connorsville's amateur club in the Dunn County League in 1937.
