= Boyceville Municipal Airport =

Airport in Wisconsin, United States

- IATA: none; ICAO: none; FAA LID: 3T3

Summary
- Airport type: Public
- Owner: Village of Boyceville
- Serves: Boyceville, Wisconsin
- Opened: October 1944
- Time zone: CST (UTC−06:00)
  - Summer (DST): CDT (UTC−05:00)
- Elevation AMSL: 967 ft (295 m)
- Coordinates: 45°2′38″N 092°1′17″W
- Website: Boycevillewi.com/Airport

Map
- Location of airport in Wisconsin 3T3 (the United States)

Runways
Direction	Length		Surface
Direction	ft	m	Surface
8/26	3,299	1,006	Asphalt

Statistics
- Aircraft operations (2021): 10,750
- Based aircraft (2024): 20
- Source: Federal Aviation Administration

Boyceville Municipal Airport, (FAA LID: 3T3) is a village owned public use airport located in the central business district of Boyceville, Wisconsin, a village in Dunn County, Wisconsin, United States. It is included in the Federal Aviation Administration (FAA) National Plan of Integrated Airport Systems for 2025–2029, in which it is categorized as a local general aviation facility.

Although most airports in the United States use the same three-letter location identifier for the FAA and International Air Transport Association (IATA), this airport is assigned 3T3 by the FAA but has no designation from the IATA.

== Facilities and aircraft ==
Boyceville Municipal Airport covers an area of 148 acres (60 ha) at an elevation of 967 feet (295 m) above mean sea level. It has one runway: 8/26, which is 3,299 by 60 feet (1,006 x 18 m) with an asphalt surface.

For the 12-month period ending July 30, 2021, the airport had 10,750 aircraft operations, an average of 29 per day: 96% general aviation, 4% military and less than 1% air taxi. In August 2024, there were 20 aircraft based at this airport: all 20 single-engine.

== See also ==
- List of airports in Wisconsin
