= Boyceville, Wisconsin =

- Village
- Location of Boyceville in Dunn County, Wisconsin.
- Coordinates: 45°2′36″N 92°2′25″W
- Country: United States
- State: Wisconsin
- County: Dunn

Area
  - Total: 3.80 sq mi (9.83 km^{2})
  - Land: 3.76 sq mi (9.74 km^{2})
  - Water: 0.035 sq mi (0.09 km^{2})
- Elevation: 945 ft (288 m)

Population (2020)
  - Total: 1,100
  - Density: 299.8/sq mi (115.75/km^{2})
- Time zone: UTC-6 (Central (CST))
  - Summer (DST): UTC-5 (CDT)
- Area codes: 715 & 534
- FIPS code: 55-09050
- GNIS feature ID: 1562107
- Website: boyceville.gov

Boyceville is a village in Dunn County, Wisconsin, United States. The population was 1,100 at the 2020 census.

== Geography ==
Boyceville is located at 45°2′36″N 92°2′25″W (45.043215, -92.040168). Boyceville has five churches and a sixth church is located north of the community, towards Connorsville.

According to the United States Census Bureau, the village has a total area of 3.89 square miles (10.08 km^{2}), of which 3.85 square miles (9.97 km^{2}) is land and 0.04 square miles (0.10 km^{2}) is water.

== Demographics ==
Historical population
| Census | Pop. | Note | %± |
|---|---|---|---|
| 1930 | 573 | | — |
| 1940 | 533 | | −7.0% |
| 1950 | 645 | | 21.0% |
| 1960 | 660 | | 2.3% |
| 1970 | 725 | | 9.8% |
| 1980 | 862 | | 18.9% |
| 1990 | 913 | | 5.9% |
| 2000 | 1,043 | | 14.2% |
| 2010 | 1,086 | | 4.1% |
| 2020 | 1,100 | | 1.3% |
U.S. Decennial Census

=== 2010 census ===
As of the census of 2010, there were 1,086 people, 454 households, and 295 families living in the village. The population density was 282.1 inhabitants per square mile (108.9/km^{2}). There were 494 housing units at an average density of 128.3 per square mile (49.5/km^{2}). The racial makeup of the village was 97.5% White, 0.2% African American, 0.6% Native American, 0.1% Asian, 0.8% from other races, and 0.8% from two or more races. Hispanic or Latino of any race were 1.7% of the population.

There were 454 households, of which 34.8% had children under the age of 18 living with them, 46.3% were married couples living together, 12.1% had a female householder with no husband present, 6.6% had a male householder with no wife present, and 35.0% were non-families. 27.8% of all households were made up of individuals, and 11% had someone living alone who was 65 years of age or older. The average household size was 2.39 and the average family size was 2.87.

The median age in the village was 36.9 years. 25% of residents were under the age of 18; 6.7% were between the ages of 18 and 24; 28.9% were from 25 to 44; 25.7% were from 45 to 64; and 13.8% were 65 years of age or older. The gender makeup of the village was 47.5% male and 52.5% female.

=== 2000 census ===
At the 2000 census, there were 1,043 people, 424 households and 268 families living in the village. The population density was 269.0 per square mile (103.8/km^{2}). There were 446 housing units at an average density of 115.0 per square mile (44.4/km^{2}). The racial makeup of the village was 98.47% White, 0.67% Native American, 0.10% from other races, and 0.77% from two or more races. Hispanic or Latino of any race were 0.38% of the population.

There were 424 households, of which 34.7% had children under the age of 18 living with them, 46.7% were married couples living together, 12.5% had a female householder with no husband present, and 36.6% were non-families. 28.5% of all households were made up of individuals, and 16.7% had someone living alone who was 65 years of age or older. The average household size was 2.46 and the average family size was 3.08.

29.4% of the population were under the age of 18, 8.0% from 18 to 24, 28.3% from 25 to 44, 19.4% from 45 to 64, and 15.0% who were 65 years of age or older. The median age was 34 years. For every 100 females, there were 85.9 males. For every 100 females age 18 and over, there were 86.8 males.

The median household income was $31,250, and the median family income was $36,389. Males had a median income of $30,270 versus $20,921 for females. The per capita income for the village was $14,674. About 11.9% of families and 13.8% of the population were below the poverty line, including 18.5% of those under age 18 and 14.3% of those age 65 or over.

== Transportation ==
Boyceville Municipal Airport (3T3) serves Boyceville and the surrounding communities.

== Education ==
The village of Boyceville has three schools in two buildings: an elementary school and a middle and high school. Boyceville's elementary school, Tiffany Creek Elementary, serves students from pre-kindergarten through fifth grade. The village's middle school and high school are located in the same building and serve students in grades six through twelve. Extra curricular activities at the middle and high school levels include, basketball, football, softball, baseball, cross country, track, volleyball, dance, cheerleading, wrestling, Science Olympiad, FFA, Academic Decathlon, quiz bowl, student council, National Honors Society, drama club, art club, FCCLA, FBLA, glee club, and yearbook.

== Notable residents ==
- Singer and music producer Madilyn Bailey was born in Boyceville
- Music professor John Boda was born in Boyceville.
- Major League Baseball player Andy Pafko grew up in Boyceville.
- Wisconsin State Representative John M. Oddie lived in Boyceville.
- Wisconsin State Representative Francis L. Peterson lived in Boyceville.
- Wisconsin State Representative Warren Petryk grew up in Boyceville and attended Boyceville High School.
- Green Bay Packers High School Coach of the Week (9/19/2024) Michael Roemhild coaches and teaches at Boyceville High School.
