= Knapp, Dunn County, Wisconsin =

Knapp
- Village
- Location of Knapp in Dunn County, Wisconsin.

- Location within the state of Wisconsin
- Coordinates: 44°57′16″N 92°4′50″W
- Country: United States
- State: Wisconsin
- County: Dunn

Area
  - Total: 1.58 sq mi (4.08 km^{2})
  - Land: 1.57 sq mi (4.07 km^{2})
  - Water: 0.0039 sq mi (0.01 km^{2})

Population (2020)
  - Total: 478
  - Density: 304/sq mi (117/km^{2})
- Time zone: UTC-6 (Central (CST))
  - Summer (DST): UTC-5 (CDT)
- Area codes: 715 & 534
- FIPS code: 55-39975
- GNIS feature ID: 1583487

Knapp is a village in Dunn County, Wisconsin, United States. The population was 478 at the 2020 census.

== History ==
A post office called Knapp (Zip code 54749) has been in operation since 1872. The village was named for John Holly Knapp, an executive in the lumber industry.

== Geography ==
Knapp is located at 44°57′16″N 92°4′50″W (44.954456, -92.080421).

According to the United States Census Bureau, the village has a total area of 1.59 square miles (4.12 km^{2}), of which 1.58 square miles (4.09 km^{2}) is land and 0.01 square miles (0.03 km^{2}) is water.

== Demographics ==
Historical population
Census	Pop.	Note	%±
1890	480		—
1910	413		—
1920	478		15.7%
1930	424		−11.3%
1940	436		2.8%
1950	424		−2.8%
1960	374		−11.8%
1970	369		−1.3%
1980	419		13.6%
1990	419		0.0%
2000	421		0.5%
2010	463		10.0%
2020	478		3.2%
U.S. Decennial Census

=== 2010 census ===
As of the census of 2010, there were 463 people, 214 households, and 122 families living in the village. The population density was 293.0 inhabitants per square mile (113.1/km^{2}). There were 230 housing units at an average density of 145.6 per square mile (56.2/km^{2}). The racial makeup of the village was 97.8% White, 1.1% Native American, and 1.1% from two or more races. Hispanic or Latino of any race were 0.2% of the population.

There were 214 households, of which 22.9% had children under the age of 18 living with them, 47.2% were married couples living together, 5.1% had a female householder with no husband present, 4.7% had a male householder with no wife present, and 43.0% were non-families. 34.1% of all households were made up of individuals, and 17.8% had someone living alone who was 65 years of age or older. The average household size was 2.16 and the average family size was 2.78.

The median age in the village was 44.9 years. 19.4% of residents were under the age of 18; 5.4% were between the ages of 18 and 24; 25.5% were from 25 to 44; 27.1% were from 45 to 64; and 22.7% were 65 years of age or older. The gender makeup of the village was 52.3% male and 47.7% female.

=== 2000 census ===
As of the census of 2000, there were 421 people, 186 households, and 116 families living in the village. The population density was 266.1 people per square mile (102.9/km^{2}). There were 198 housing units at an average density of 125.1/sq mi (48.4/km^{2}). The racial makeup of the village was 99.05% White, 0.71% African American, and 0.24% from two or more races. Hispanic or Latino of any race were 0.95% of the population.

There were 186 households, out of which 29.0% had children under the age of 18 living with them, 51.1% were married couples living together, 9.1% had a female householder with no husband present, and 37.6% were non-families. 32.3% of all households were made up of individuals, and 15.6% had someone living alone who was 65 years of age or older. The average household size was 2.26 and the average family size was 2.88.

In the village, the population was spread out, with 23.5% under the age of 18, 9.0% from 18 to 24, 30.2% from 25 to 44, 23.8% from 45 to 64, and 13.5% who were 65 years of age or older. The median age was 39 years. For every 100 females, there were 94.9 males. For every 100 females age 18 and over, there were 95.2 males.

The median income for a household in the village was $38,472, and the median income for a family was $47,500. Males had a median income of $35,833 versus $20,089 for females. The per capita income for the village was $22,636. About 3.5% of families and 8.1% of the population were below the poverty line, including 7.1% of those under age 18 and 23.1% of those age 65 or over.

== Notable people ==
- Albert R. Hall, a businessman who served seven terms in the Minnesota House of Representatives and six (representing Dunn County) in the Wisconsin State Assembly, had a farm outside of Knapp; his sister
- Caroline A. Hall, co-founder of the National Grange of the Order of Patrons of Husbandry ("The Grange"), lived on the farm with her brother, and inherited it when he died in 1905
