= Red Cedar River (Wisconsin) =

River in western Wisconsin

Coordinates: 44.70580°N 91.88239°W

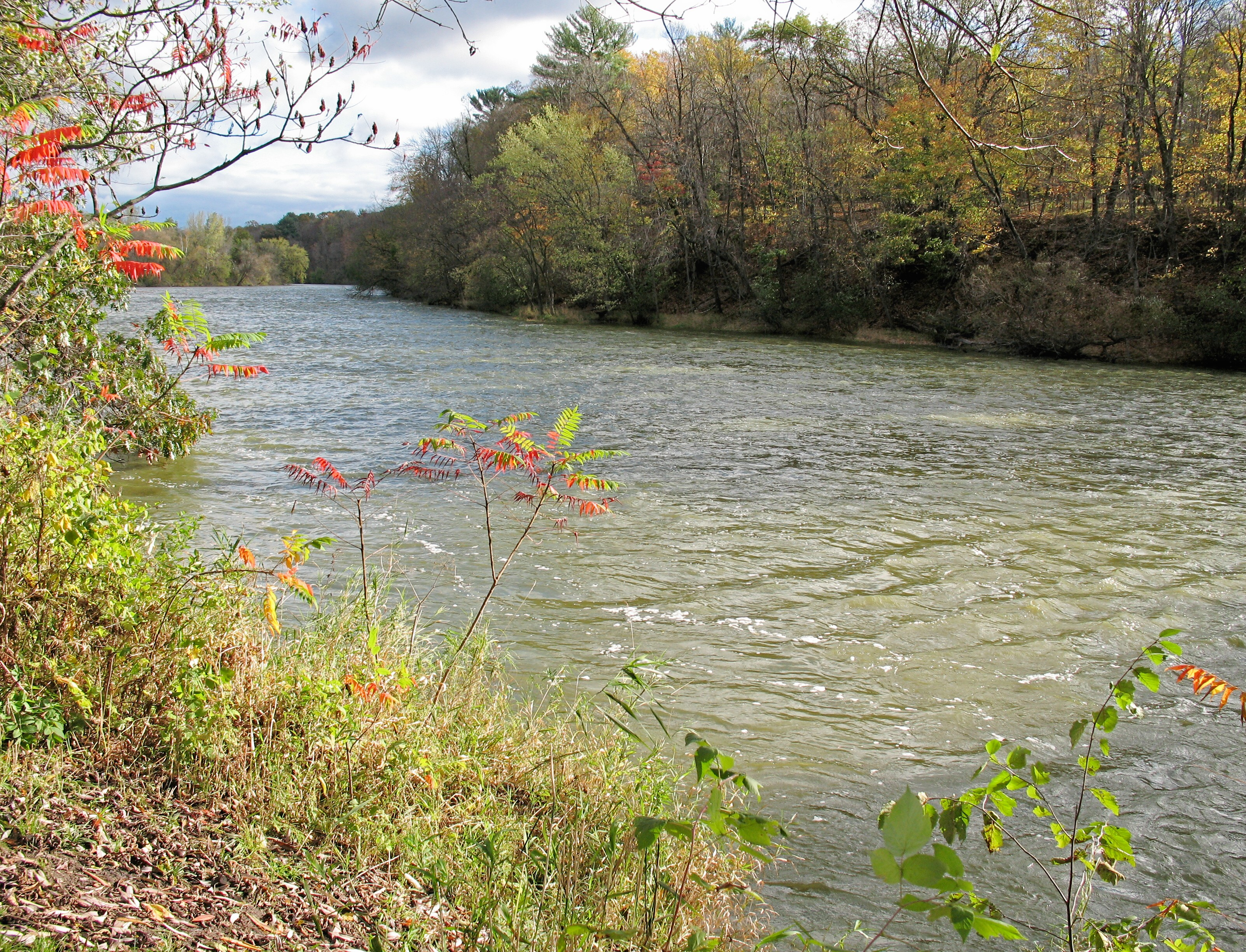
The Red Cedar River as viewed from the Red Cedar State Trail in Menomonie in 2007

The Red Cedar River in northwestern Wisconsin is a tributary of the Chippewa River. According to the Wisconsin Department of Natural Resources, the river flows approximately 100 miles from southwestern Sawyer County to its confluence with the Chippewa southeast of Dunnville in southern Dunn County. It drains portions of eight Wisconsin counties: Barron, Chippewa, Dunn, Polk, Rusk, St. Croix, Sawyer, and Washburn.

Important tributaries include the Chetek River and the Hay River.

Important settlements along the river's course include Cameron, Rice Lake, Colfax, and Menomonie.

Much of the river's course runs through Dunn County, which it nearly bisects from north to south. The Red Cedar flows through Red Cedar Lake and Rice Lake in Barron County (adjacent to the city of Rice Lake), and two reservoirs in central Dunn County: Tainter Lake and Lake Menomin. Below the dam that creates Lake Menomin in Menomonie the Red Cedar River is well known for its large walleye population.
