= National Register of Historic Places listings in Dunn County, Wisconsin =

Location of Dunn County in Wisconsin

This is a list of the National Register of Historic Places listings in Dunn County, Wisconsin. It is intended to provide a comprehensive listing of entries in the National Register of Historic Places that are located in Dunn County, Wisconsin. The locations of National Register properties for which the latitude and longitude coordinates are included below may be seen in a map.

There are 8 properties and districts listed on the National Register in the county.

This National Park Service list is complete through NPS recent listings posted August 8, 2025.

== Current listings ==
	Name on the Register	Image	Date listed	Location	City or town	Description
1	Colfax Municipal Building	Colfax Municipal Building	January 28, 2004 (#03001542)	613 Main St. 45°00′03″N 91°43′40″W	Colfax	Designed by Carl Volkman of Eau Claire and built around 1915 with local Colfax sandstone, the building housed the police station, fire station, meeting rooms, library, auditorium and banquet hall.
2	Downsville Lodge No. 1961 I.O.O.F.	Downsville Lodge No. 1961 I.O.O.F.	January 17, 2017 (#100000517)	E4541 Cty Rd. C 44°46′28″N 91°55′54″W	Dunn	2-story Odd-Fellows Hall built in 1908 from sandstone block in Romanesque Revival style.
3	Evergreen Cemetery	Evergreen Cemetery	December 6, 2006 (#06001117)	N end of Shorewood Dr. 44°53′21″N 91°54′35″W	Menomonie	The huge lumber company Knapp, Stout and Co. started Evergreen, overlooking Lake Menomin, in 1873. William M.R. French and Horace Cleveland planned the curving roads and views. Includes the 1901 sculpture (shown) honoring Civil War and Spanish–American War dead.
4	Menomonie Downtown Historic District	Menomonie Downtown Historic District	July 14, 1986 (#86001667)	Roughly bounded by Main and Crescent Sts., Fifth St., Wilson, and Second St. and Broadway; 44°52′32″N 91°55′28″W	Menomonie	Both commercial and educational buildings in various styles, including the 1883 Italianate Lucas Block, the 1888 Italianate First National Bank, the 1889 Mabel Tainter Memorial, the 1897 Richardsonian Romanesque Bowman Hall, the 1907 Neoclassical Schutte & Quilling Bank, the 1913 Neoclassical U.S. Post Office, and the 1924 Art Deco Knights of Pythias Hall.
5	Menomonie Omaha Depot	Menomonie Omaha Depot	September 4, 2018 (#100002856)	700 4th St. W 44°52′34″N 91°55′58″W	Menomonie	Railroad depot of the Chicago, St. Paul, Minneapolis and Omaha Railway, designed by Horace Padley and built in 1906. Served passengers until 1961.
6	Louis Smith Tainter House	Louis Smith Tainter House	July 18, 1974 (#74000082)	Broadway at Crescent; 44°52′44″N 91°55′45″W	Menomonie	1890 home built by Andrew Tainter, a lumberman partner in Knapp, Stout and Co., for his son. Designed in Richardsonian Romanesque style by Harvey Ellis. Later a women's dormitory and now offices of UW-Stout.
7	Mabel Tainter Memorial Building	Mabel Tainter Memorial Building	July 18, 1974 (#74000083)	205 Main St. 44°52′35″N 91°55′44″W	Menomonie	Theater, library, and meeting building completed in 1889, designed by Harvey Ellis in Richardsonian Romanesque style. Andrew Tainter and his wife built it to honor their daughter Mabel, who enjoyed the arts and died at age 19.
8	Upper Wakanda Park Mound Group	Upper Wakanda Park Mound Group	July 8, 1999 (#99000818)	Wakanda Park; 44°54′02″N 91°55′02″W	Menomonie	Three oval mounds remain. Before seventeen nearby mounds were submerged beneath Lake Menomin in the 1950s, some were excavated and dated 1000 to 1400 CE. A person was found in one cremated wearing a clay mask.

== See also ==
- List of National Historic Landmarks in Wisconsin
- National Register of Historic Places listings in Wisconsin
- Listings in neighboring counties: Barron, Chippewa, Eau Claire, Pepin, Pierce, Polk
