= Jeremiah Burnham Tainter =

American inventor (1836–1920)

- Born: January 6, 1836; Prairie du Chien, Wisconsin, U.S.
- Died: February 5, 1920 (aged 84)

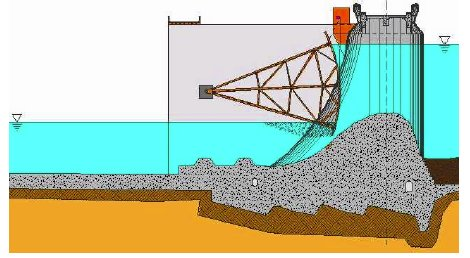
Side view cut-away diagram of the radial arm of the Tainter gate, Ice Harbor Dam, Snake River, Pasco, Washington (USACE)

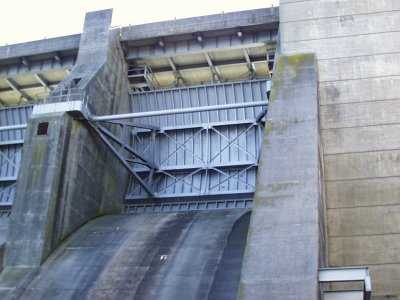
Tainter gate from the back, or spillway, on the John H. Kerr Dam, Boydton, Virginia (USACE)

Jeremiah Burnham Tainter (January 6, 1836 in Prairie du Chien, Wisconsin – February 5, 1920) was an inventor and engineer known for having designed the Tainter gate in 1886. He began his work in hydrology in 1862, with the modification of pre-existing mill pond dams in Menomonie. Tainter was employed by Knapp, Stout & Co., the largest lumber manufacturer in the United States in the last quarter of the 19th century.

His brother, Andrew Tainter, was a principal in Knapp, Stout.

Tainter's inventions include:

- U.S. patent 226,455 Thomas Parker, Jeremiah B. Tainter, Andrew Tainter & James Downing, "Sluiceway-gate." Issued April 13, 1880.
- U.S. patent 241,443 Jeremiah Burnham Tainter, "Fifth wheel for vehicles." Issued May 10, 1881.
- U.S. patent 241,444 Jeremiah Burnham Tainter, "Automatic sluiceway gate." Issued May 10, 1881.
- U.S. patent 344,877 Jeremiah Burnham Tainter, "Coffer-dam." Issued July 6, 1886.
- U.S. patent 344,878 Jeremiah Burnham Tainter, "Sluiceway gate." Issued July 6, 1886.
- U.S. patent 344,879 Jeremiah Burnham Tainter, "Canal-lock." Issued July 6, 1886.
- U.S. patent 400,511 Jeremiah Burnham Tainter & Nathan B. Noble, "Snap-hook." Issued April 2, 1889.
- U.S. patent 1,082,291 Jeremiah B. Tainter, "Dam." Issued December 23, 1913.
