= Wilson Place Museum =

Museum in Menomonie, Wisconsin

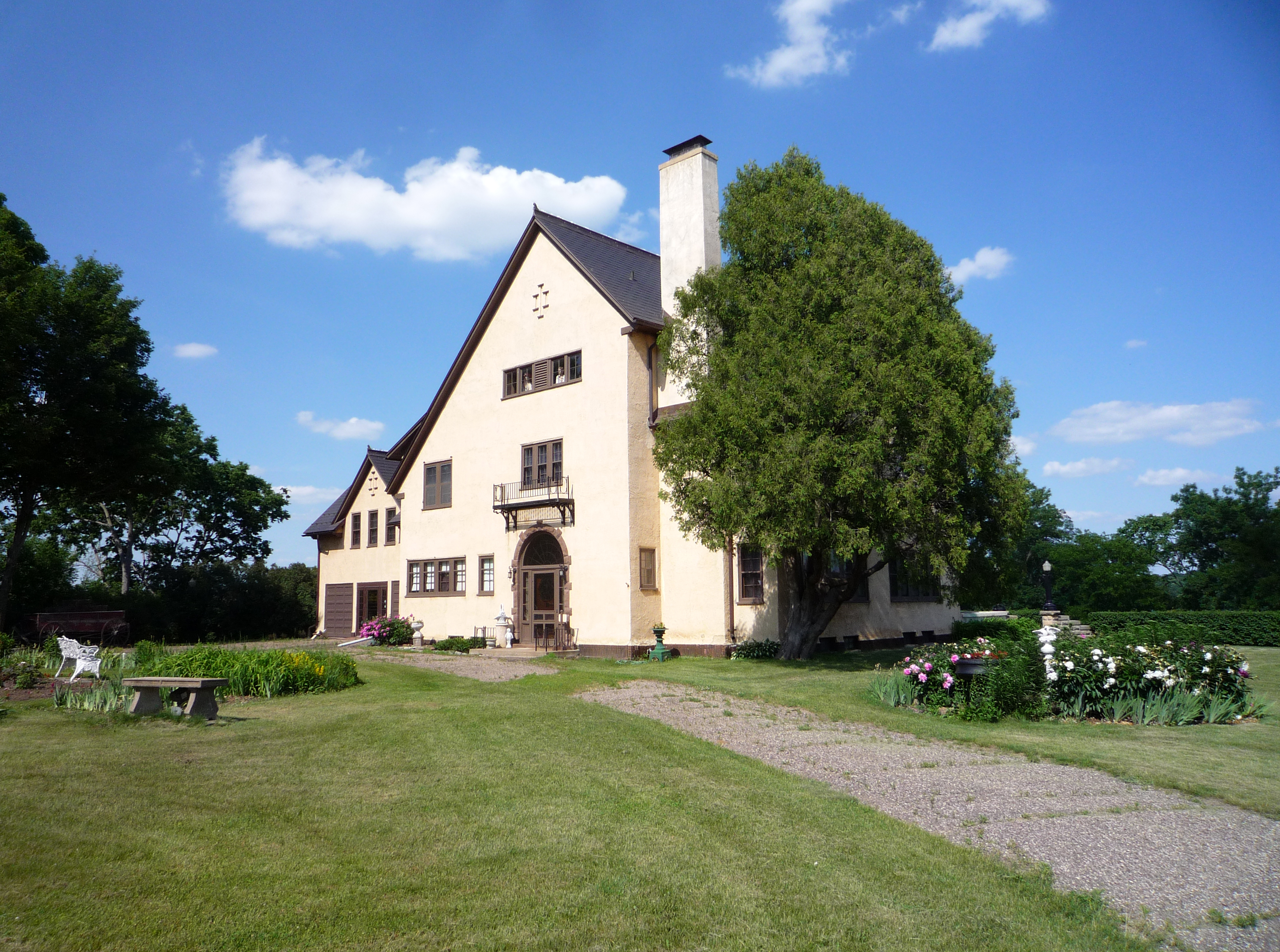
- view of the front entrance of Wilson Place Museum
- Established: 2002 - Non-Profit Status 1976 - When the Wilson Place Museum first opened.
- Location: 101 Wilson Circle; Menomonie, Wisconsin
- Coordinates: 44.8828°N 91.92968°W
- Type: Historical
- Founder: Jackie, John and Tim Dotseth
- Website: https://www.WilsonPlace.org

Wilson Place Museum is a house museum in Menomonie, Wisconsin. Today, the Wilson Place Museum offers a glimpse into the lives of the Wilsons and their descendants through three major architectural periods — Colonial, Queen Anne, and Mediterranean. Many of the original furnishings have remained at this site since 1846, providing an authentic window into the daily life of Menomonie’s early citizens.

== History ==
It was originally built in 1859 by Captain William Wilson, a local lumber baron, first mayor of Menomonie and the area's first state senator. The house was originally built in the colonial style, and was much bigger than it is today. Wilson built a sandstone wall around the 22-acre estate in 1875, part of which still stands. The building was given the name Wilson Place in 1859, which Wilson's descendants maintained through their ownership.

Wilson died in 1892 and the home passed to his daughter, Angelina, the wife of James Huff Stout, son of Henry L. Stout, one of the original partners of the Knapp, Stout & Co. Company. The Stouts undertook a large remodeling project, expanding the building into a large mansion in the Queen Anne style. This included the addition of 17 marble fireplaces, a ballroom, a carved mahogany staircase, and wrap-around porches.

Wilson's grandson, George Wilson LaPointe, Jr., another lumber baron, and his wife Irene took possession of the home in the early 1920s. The LaPointes also undertook a large remodeling project, reducing the size of the house by two-thirds, transforming it into a Mediterranean style villa in 1931. This is the version of the building that currently stands.

Irene LaPointe died in 1974, and the building was acquired by local couple Jackie and John Dotseth, who were not aware of its history and intended to use it as a retirement home. The Dotseths decided to open the home as a museum, instead, receiving 501c non-profit status in 2002. It has been preserved as the Wilson Place Museum to provide visitors a view into the lives of the Wilson, Stout, and LaPointe families, the founders of Menomonie, the University of Wisconsin-Stout, and the Knapp, Stout & Co. lumber company, as well as the history of Menomonie.
