= Kraft State Bank robbery =

1931 bank robbery in Menomonie, Wisconsin

Coordinates: 44.8763°N 91.9243°W

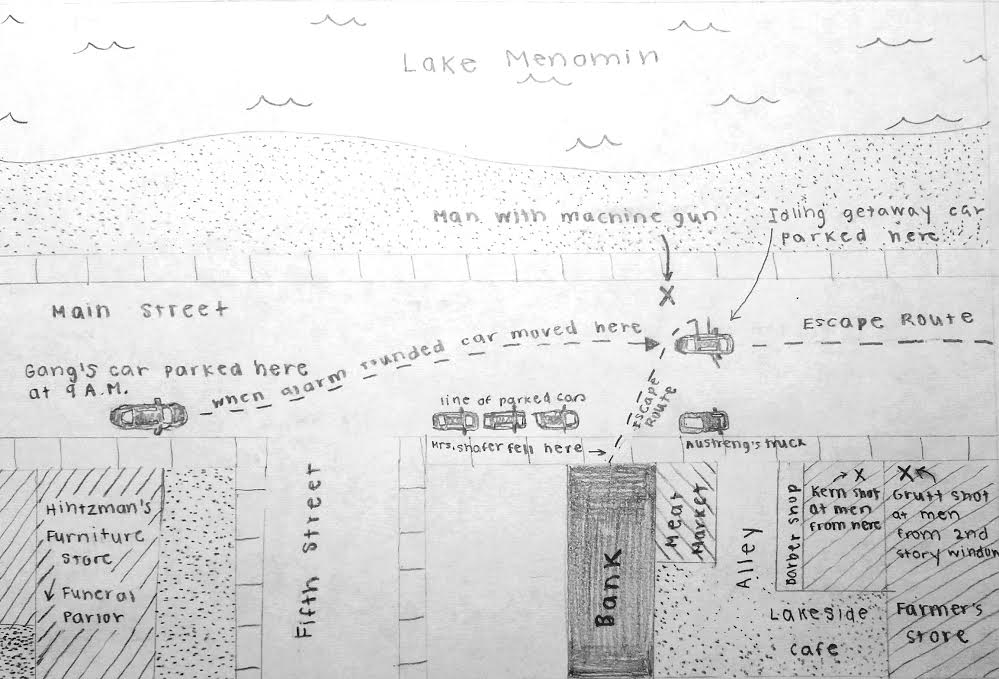
A map of what happened at the Kraft State Bank Robbery

The Kraft State Bank robbery occurred on October 20, 1931 in Menomonie, Wisconsin when four men stole US$90,000 ($1,421,094.08 in 2016) dollars from the Kraft State Bank.

== Robbery ==
At 9:15 am, the three men drove up to the Kraft State Bank in a 1928 Phaeton model L Lincoln, and four men walked into the bank. They forced all the people at the bank to lay down on the floor while the money was taken being taken from the vault. Two people were injured in the robbery, including the owner of the bank.

Their robbery was ended after guard Vernon Townsend tripped the alarm. The robbers fled with $90,000 and two hostages, one of whom was left behind after tripping.

In their escape the robbers came under fire from several inhabitants of the town. In the ensuing firefight, Frank Webber was severely wounded and eventually died. Pursued by armed vigilantes and the town sheriff, the group left nails on the road behind them. On Suckow Road they left the hostage—who had been killed by this point—and Webber's bodies on the road. Shortly afterwards, they also abandoned Charles Preston Harmon, who died soon after from injuries received earlier in the robbery. The two remaining robbers disappeared soon after. In the ensuing hunt, District Attorney A. W. Galvin accused Richard Newman and Leonard Hankins of being the robbers, but they were found innocent.

The last two robbers, Francis Keating and Tommy Holden, were arrested in Kansas City, Missouri, after eight months. They were eventually sent to Leavenworth Prison.
