= Menomonie station =

Menomonie
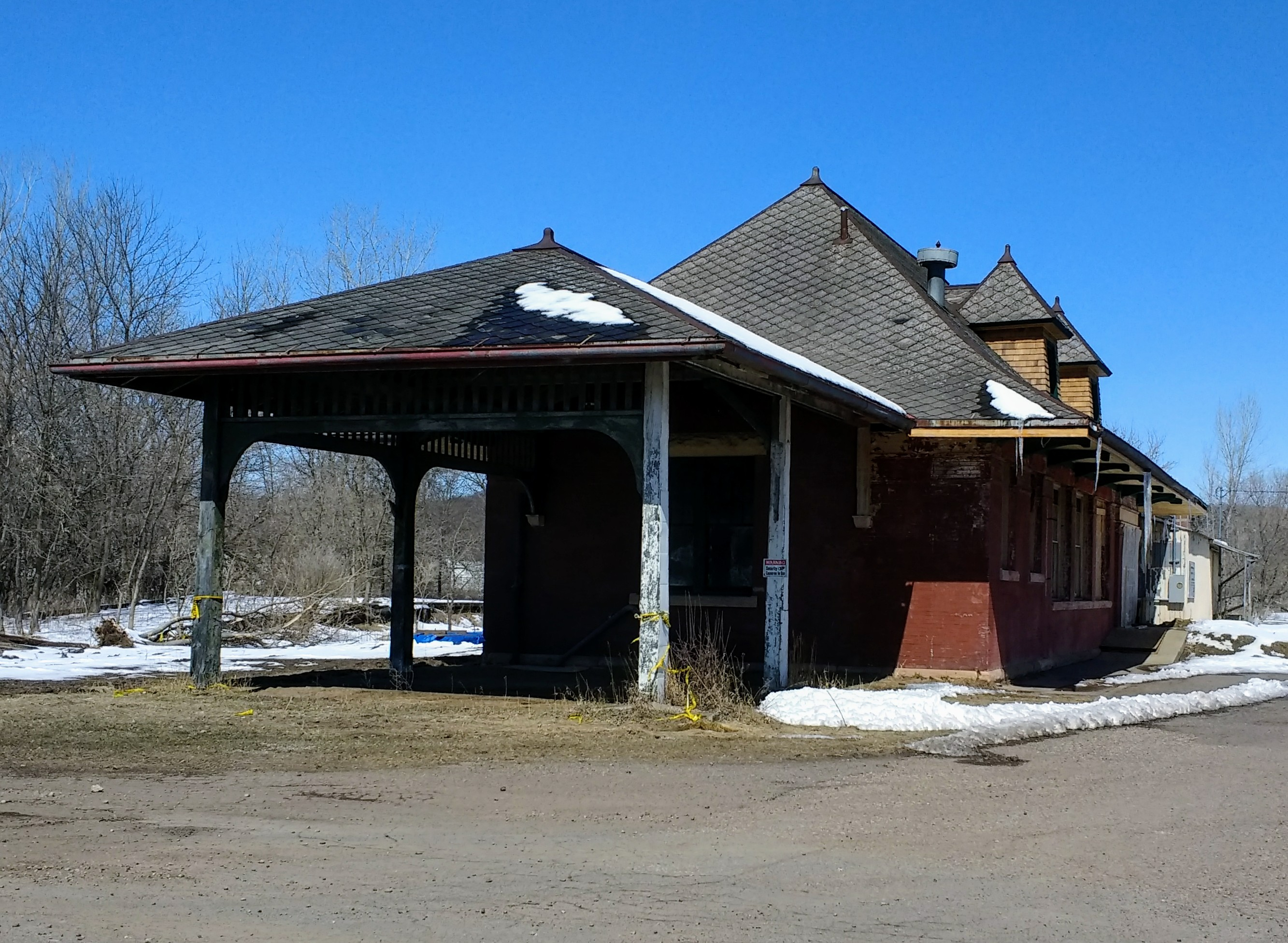
- The Menomonie CStPM&O Depot in 2018

General information
- Location: 700 4th St. W, Menomonie, Wisconsin

History
- Opened: 1906
- Closed: 1961

Former services
Preceding station	Chicago and North Western Railway	Following station
Terminus	Menomonie Branch	Menomonie Junction Terminus
- Menomonie Omaha Depot
- U.S. National Register of Historic Places
- Location within Wisconsin Location within the United States
- Location: 700 4th St. W, Menomonie, Wisconsin
- Coordinates: 44°52′34″N 91°55′58″W
- Area: less than one acre
- Built: 1906
- Architect: Horace Padley
- NRHP reference No.: 100002856
- Added to NRHP: September 4, 2018
Location

Menomonie station, also known as the Menomonie Omaha Depot, is a former passenger train station located at 700 4th Street West in Menomonie, Wisconsin. The Chicago, St. Paul, Minneapolis and Omaha Railroad built the station in 1906 to replace an earlier station building. The railway operated the station until passenger service to Menomonie ended in 1961. It was added to the National Register of Historic Places in 2018. Today the depot serves as a restaurant.

== History ==
Service on the Chicago, St. Paul, Minneapolis and Omaha Railroad to Menomonie began in 1871, when the railroad opened its line from Tomah, Wisconsin to St. Paul, Minnesota. As the first station was 3 miles (4.8 km) from downtown Menomonie, the city funded a branch line into downtown, which opened in 1880. The growth of rail traffic in Menomonie and the poor quality of the original station building led community groups to petition the railroad for a new station in the 1900s; the railroad agreed, and the present station opened in 1906. The station was an important civic hub for Menominee, as it served as the city's main connection to the rest of the country until the growth of the automobile post-World War II. The Chicago, St. Paul, Minneapolis and Omaha Railroad and its parent company, the Chicago and North Western Railway, operated passenger trains to the station until 1961.

The station was added to the National Register of Historic Places on September 4, 2018.

== Architecture ==
Horace P. Padley, an employee of the railroad, designed the station, which was built by the Newman & Hoy Company. The railroad typically built its stations according to standard plans to save money, and its architects added details to distinguish the individual buildings. The one-story brick building is 91 feet (28 m) long and 30 feet (9.1 m) deep, with the longer side facing the tracks; there is an open sheltered area on one end for passenger baggage. The building features limestone trim, bracketed eaves, and a pair of dormers on either side of its roof, all common elements used by the railroad. The interior plan included a general waiting room, a women's waiting room, an agent's office, restrooms, a boiler room, and a baggage room.
