= Evergreen Cemetery (Menomonie, Wisconsin) =

Historic cemetery in Dunn County, Wisconsin

- U.S. National Register of Historic Places
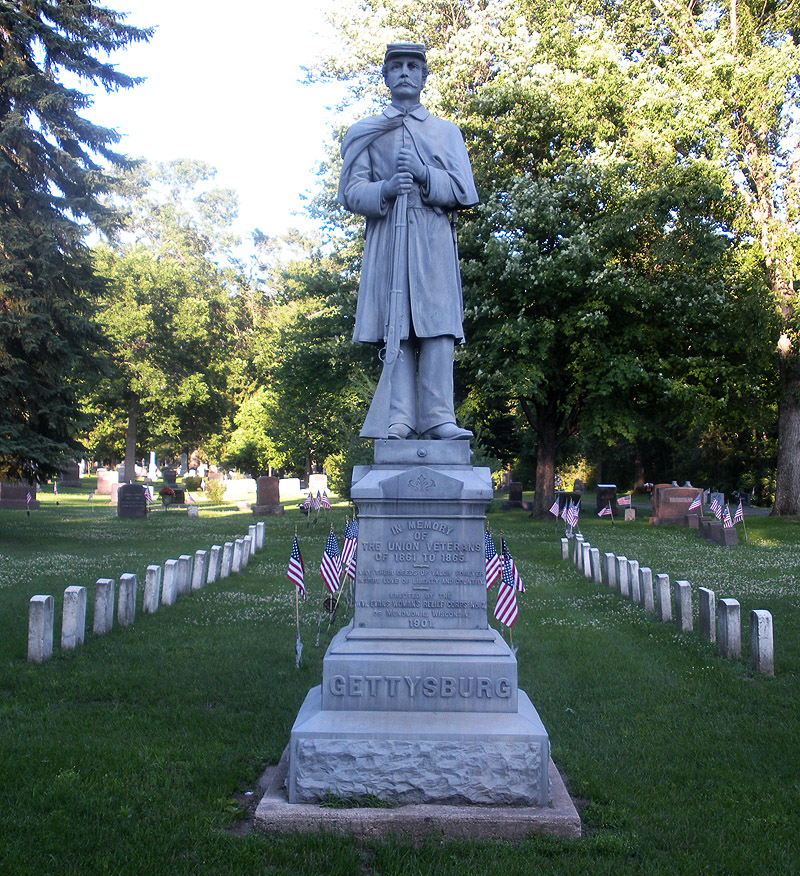
- Location: Menomonie, Wisconsin
- Coordinates: 44.88915°N 91.90983°W
- Built: 1873
- Architect: Cleveland and French
- Architectural style: Late 19th And Early 20th Century American Movements
- NRHP reference No.: 06001117
- Added to NRHP: 2006

Evergreen Cemetery is a cemetery in Menomonie, Wisconsin and the largest in Dunn County. It was founded as a private cemetery by Knapp Stout and Company, Menomonie's huge lumber company. There are over 1100 graves in the "single grave" section of the cemetery, however many lack headstones because the earliest families could not afford to purchase them on a mill worker's salary. The cemetery is located on Lake Menomin.

== Veterans of war ==
Evergreen Cemetery contains the graves of many United States war veterans. The cemetery is divided into sections for single graves, including those for the Spanish–American War and World War I. One of the more notable plots is the Tainter family plot, which is accompanied by a historic marker. The lot includes Dr. Stephen Tainter, a physician and Revolutionary War hero who enlisted at age 16 in 1776. Tainter's body was relocated by his grandson Captain Andrew Tainter, a "lumber baron" and partner at Knapp Stout and Company, the organization that founded the cemetery.
