= Lake Menomin =

Reservoir in northwestern Wisconsin

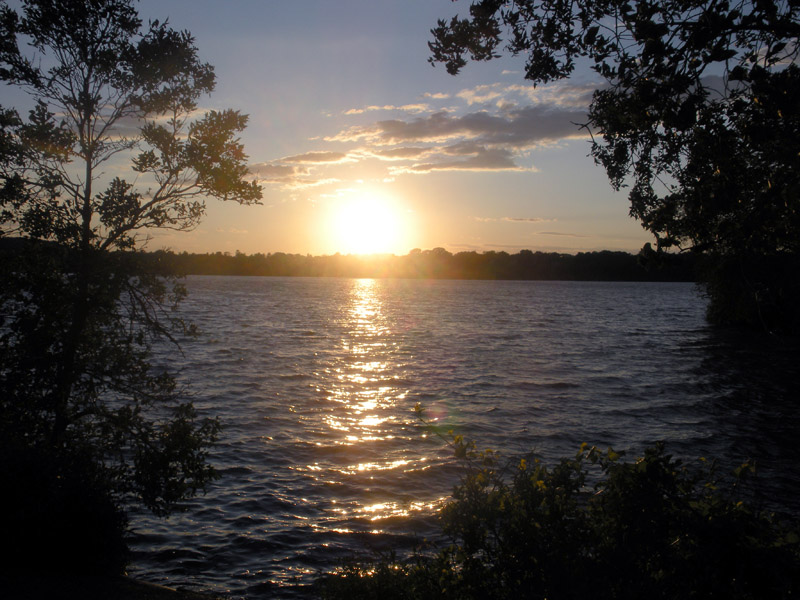
- Sunset view of Lake Menomin from Evergreen Cemetery

- Location within Wisconsin Location within the United States
- Location: Dunn County, Wisconsin
- Coordinates: 44°53′02″N 091°55′45″W
- Type: reservoir
- Primary inflows: Red Cedar River
- Primary outflows: Red Cedar River
- Basin countries: United States
- Surface area: 1,009 acres (408 ha)
- Max. depth: 34 ft (10 m)
- Surface elevation: 814 feet (248 m)

Lake Menomin is a reservoir on the Red Cedar River, in Dunn County, Wisconsin, USA.

Along the lake's western and southern shores lies the city of Menomonie, the central business district of which is located at the far southern end of the lake, near the dam which forms it. There are multiple public parks, trails, beaches, and boat landings along the lake's shoreline. Common fish found in lake Menomin include Panfish, Largemouth and Smallmouth Bass, Northern Pike, and Walleye. Throughout the summer, blue-green algae blooms afflict the lake due to high nutrient levels.

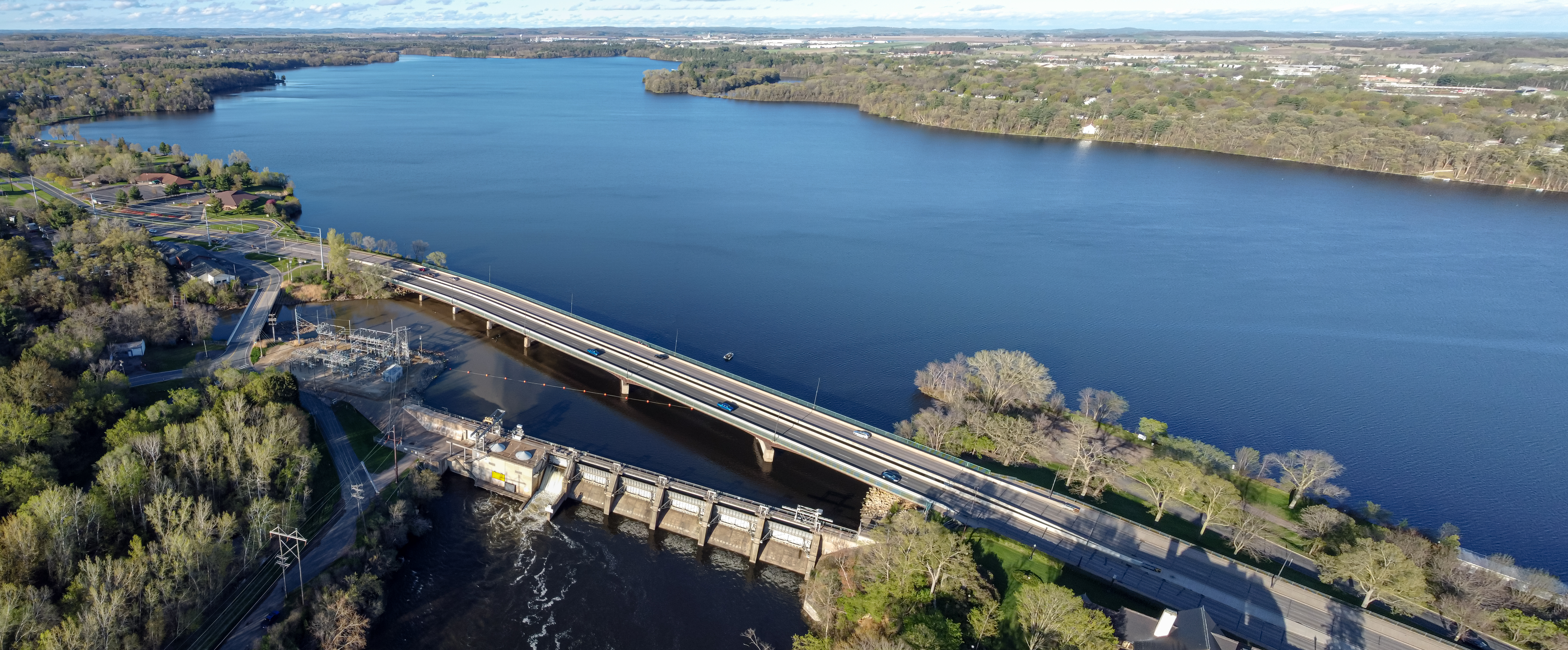
Lake Menomin and hydroelectric dam

The Tainter gate was invented for use with the reservoir's 1886 dam.
