= Mabel Tainter Memorial Building =

- U.S. National Register of Historic Places
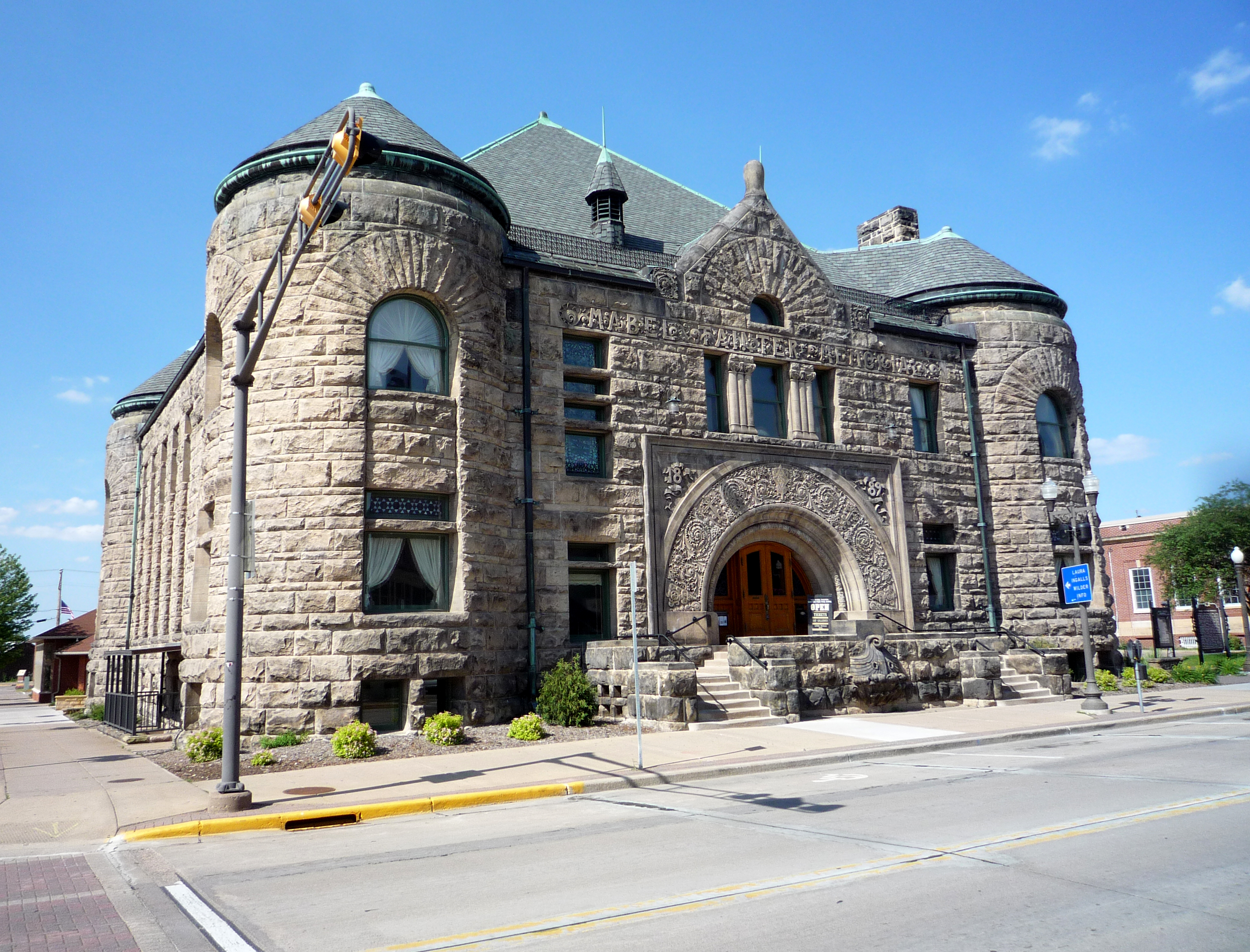

- Location within Wisconsin
- Location: 205 Main St. Menomonie, Wisconsin
- Coordinates: 44°52′36″N 91°55′41″W
- Built: 1889
- Architect: Harvey Ellis
- Architectural style: Romanesque
- NRHP reference No.: 74000083
- Added to NRHP: 1974

The Mabel Tainter Center for the Arts, originally named the Mabel Tainter Memorial Building and also known as the Mabel Tainter Theater, is a historic landmark in Menomonie, Wisconsin, and is registered on the U.S. National Register of Historic Places.

== History ==
The building was commissioned by Captain and Mrs. Andrew Tainter (whose son's house, the Louis Smith Tainter House, is also on the National Register), to honor their late daughter Mabel Tainter, who died in 1886 at age 19. The lumber baron's daughter had enjoyed music and the arts, so the building was designed to serve those areas and no expense was spared by the parents. Designed by Harvey Ellis or Edgar Joraleman, both architects in the Minneapolis firm of L. S. Buffington in the Richardsonian Romanesque style, the building was constructed in 1889.

The Tainters were wanting to do something to memorialize their late daughter when Reverend Henry Doty Maxson, a Unitarian minister, arrived in Menomonie in April 1888 to organize a local Unitarian society. They were Unitarians and discussed their wish with him. They were inspired by his suggestion to create a community center that would “deepen, broaden, heighten the entire round of life” as a memorial.

Construction began in April 1889 on property in the heart of the business district that had contained a livery stable that Tainter already owned. There was a brief explanation in March in the local weekly newspaper, the Dunn County News, that Captain Tainter owned the livery stable being razed, but no mention of what was going to be built.

It wasn't until the end of December that the general public learned the details of the new large building on Main Street. Captain Tainter wrote a brief note to the Unitarian Society explaining his purpose - “It is my purpose to convey the Memorial building I am erecting in this city to trustees for certain public uses and purposes, among which is the tender to your society and congregation of a place for the prosecution of its educational, charitable, social and religious work. I hope to have the building ready for use on or before the middle of May next.” When this news appeared in the weekly newspaper, the editor added additional information in response to the “all sorts of speculation and conjecture respecting the character and purpose of the memorial building” since construction began. He said that while some people would have “herald[ed] in advance their purposes and plans,” Tainter “entered upon this work with his same business methods and, very naturally, he did not see any more reason to take the entire public into his confidence in this case, than he would in any other matter of business.” He added that the building will include a free public library and reading room, an auditorium, parlors, amusement rooms, dining room, kitchen, and offices.

The building was dedicated on July 3, 1890, with a ceremony in the building's theater. Featured guests were Captain and Mrs. Tainter, Menomonie's mayor and common council, and the president of the Mabel Tainter Literary, Library and Education Society, L. S. Tainter, a brother of the late Mabel. The presentation address was given by Rev. H. D. Maxson, a Unitarian minister who had been instrumental in working with the Tainter family in developing the idea for the building. The trust was accepted by S. W. Hunt, and the dedicatory address was delivered by Rev. J. H. Crocker of Madison, Wisconsin.

The Mabel Tainter Memorial Building, which cost approximately $125,000, was donated by Captain and Mrs. Tainter to the private Mabel Tainter Literary, Library and Education Society to own and manage the building during the dedication. As stated at the time, "In accordance with her wish, the father and mother have felt the fittest monument to the dear dead is a contribution to the welfare of the living."

Until Captain Tainter's death in 1899, he provided funds to cover the operating costs of the building. At his death, he established an endowment fund of $65,000 for the society. By 1925, the endowment had grown to $105,000 through legacies left by other members of the Tainter family and other individuals.

== Description of the Building ==
The exterior stone is Dunnville sandstone quarried from along the Red Cedar River about six miles south of town. The architect used Moorish influences in addition to the Richardsonian Romanesque style that guided most of his work. The interior contains hand-stenciled walls and ceilings, marble staircase and floors, stained glass windows, four fireplaces, brass fixtures and walnut and oak woodwork. The building still has its original Steere and Turner pipe organ, with a total of 1597 pipes and 28 stops; originally water-powered, it was eventually converted to electric power and completely restored. The building included both an ornate 313-seat theater and a reading room.

The building was intended to be the home of the Unitarian Society of Menomonie. The original deed to the society gave the Unitarian Society free use of the auditorium, assembly room, parlors, ladies' work room and young men's club room. It continues to meet there on a regular basis.

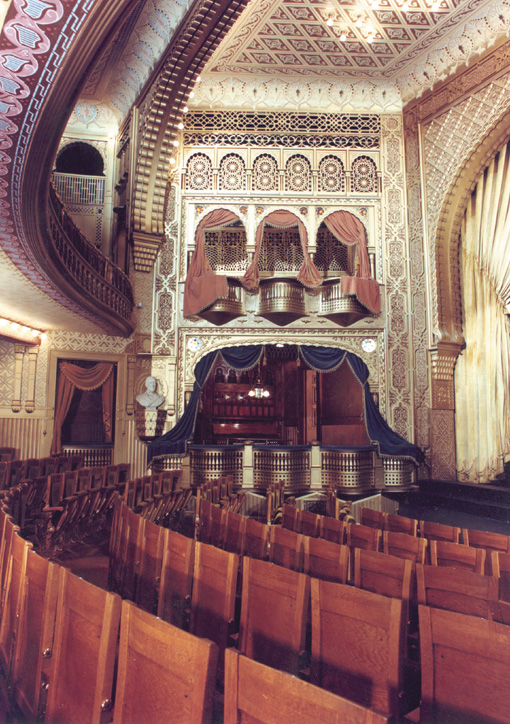
The interior of the Theater.

As the name of the society indicates, the building was also intended to become Menomonie's public library, replacing the public library in second-floor rooms across Main Street. The city library donated (subject to recall) 745 of its 3,000 volumes to the new library, distributing the rest to the public schools. In addition, Captain Tainter donated his 3,000 volume collection. The city also provided $200 a year to the new library. The Mabel Tainter Memorial Library opened January 21, 1891 with nearly 4,000 volumes.

By 1925 the collection included 16,374 volumes, 2,577 public documents, and 3,930 pamphlets. The library was open to any resident of the county.

Needing more space and better accessibility, the Menomonie Public library moved to a new single story building in 1986. The former Reading Room is now the Mabel Tainter Center for the Arts Box Office & Gallery Store.

Although the historic elegance and beauty remain intact at the Mabel Tainter Memorial Building, construction was recently completed to update the building's accessibility and safety features. A new entrance, public elevator, new wiring, a sprinkler system, and other safety updates were installed to improve the facility and ensure its longevity in historic downtown Menomonie.

The building was listed on the National Register of Historic Places in 1974, is a charter member of the League of Historic American Theatres and a designated Wisconsin Historical Marker Site.

Today, the Mabel Tainter Center for the Arts—a tax-exempt, 501(c)3 nonprofit organization—owns and operates the building. The organization offers a performing arts and comedy series, an annual fine arts and crafts fair, and other arts and cultural programming. The Menomonie Theater Guild also presents much of its season at the Mabel Tainter Center for the Arts.

Note: Information about the Tainter Memorial assembled for National Register listing some decades ago has been superseded by later historical research, and in fact in recent years the Register information has been modified to reflect the conclusion that Ellis did not design the building. More likely Edgar E. Joralemon, who replaced Ellis in Buffington's office, did.
