= Menomonie Downtown Historic District =

Historic district in Wisconsin, United States

- U.S. National Register of Historic Places
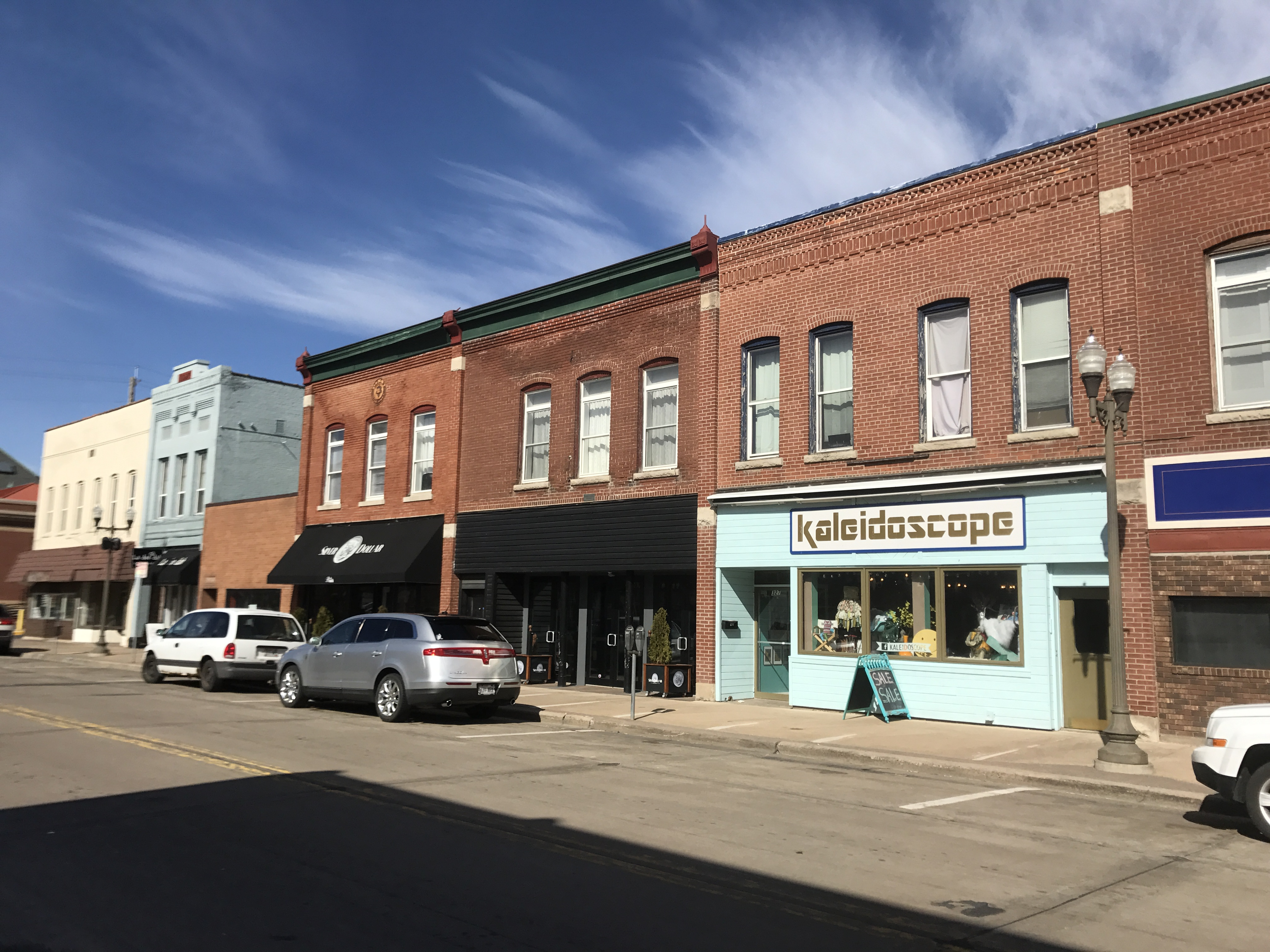
- A portion of the district.
- Location: Roughly bounded by Main and Crescent Sts., Fifth St., Wilson, and Second St. and Broadway, Menomonie, Wisconsin
- Area: 8.3 acres (3.4 ha)
- NRHP reference No.: 86001667
- Added to NRHP: July 14, 1986

The Menomonie Downtown Historic District is located in Menomonie, Wisconsin.

== Description ==
The district includes commercial and educational buildings in various styles, including the 1883 Italianate Lucas Block, the 1888 Italianate First National Bank, the 1889 Mabel Tainter Memorial, the 1897 Richardsonian Romanesque Bowman Hall, the 1907 Neoclassical Schutte & Quilling Bank, the 1913 Neoclassical U.S. Post Office, and the 1924 Art Deco Knights of Pythias Hall.

It was listed on the National Register of Historic Places in 1986 and on the State Register of Historic Places in 1989.
