= Louis Smith Tainter House =

Historic house in Wisconsin, United States

- U.S. National Register of Historic Places
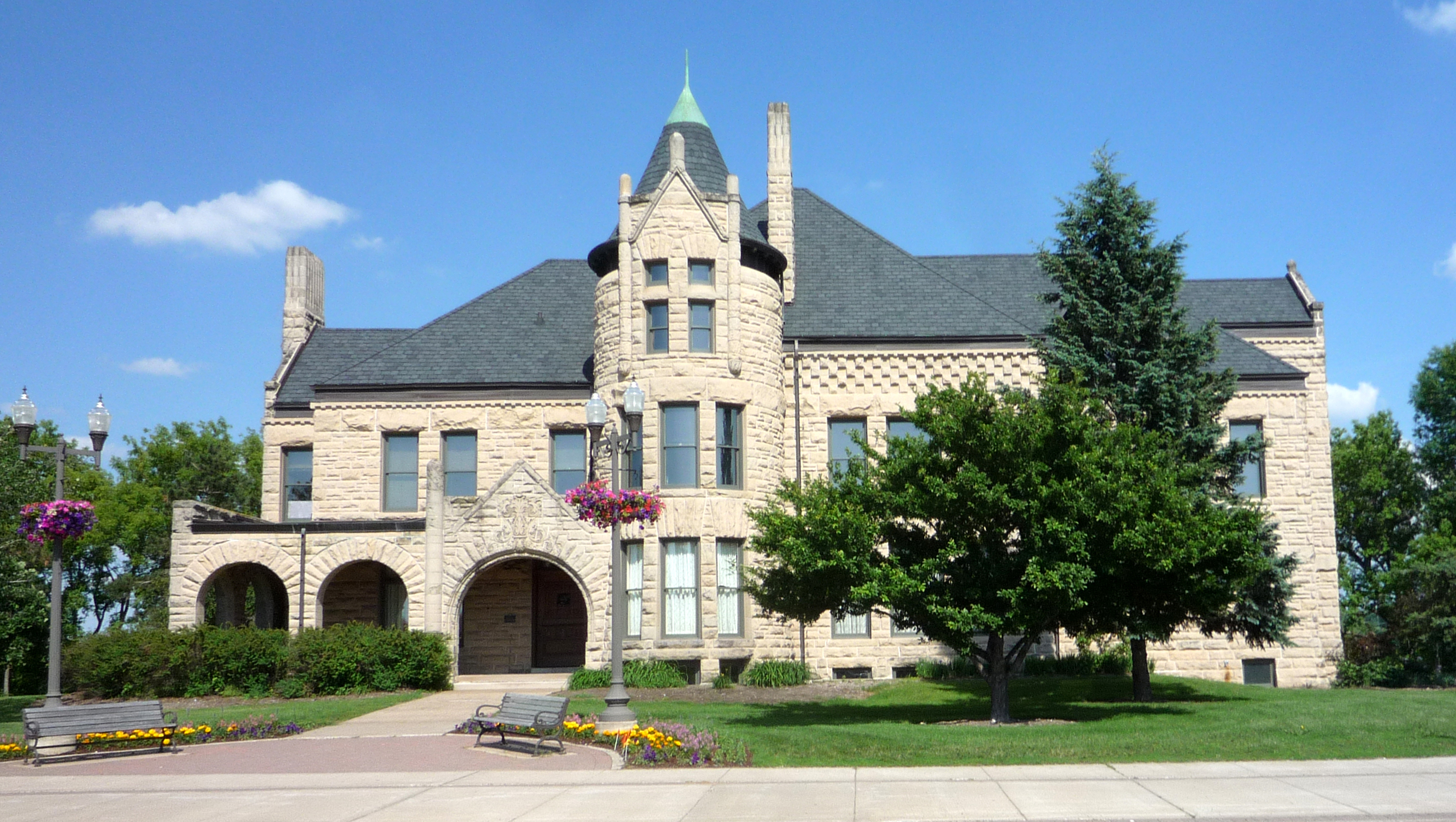
- Louis Smith Tainter House in 2009

- Location within Wisconsin Location within the United States
- Location: Broadway at Crescent, Menomonie, Wisconsin
- Coordinates: 44°52′44″N 91°55′45″W
- Area: less than one acre
- Built: 1889
- Architect: Harvey Ellis
- Architectural style: Richardsonian Romanesque
- NRHP reference No.: 74000082
- Added to NRHP: July 18, 1974

The Louis Smith Tainter House is a historic building in Menomonie, Wisconsin, United States. The building was built in 1889 by architect Harvey Ellis; it was funded by Andrew Tainter, a partner in Knapp, Stout & Co., as a home and wedding gift for his son Louis Smith Tainter. The building was built out of locally quarried sandstone in the Richardsonian Romanesque style. Paul Wilson, the son of lumberman William Wilson, owned the house after Tainter; in 1940, Dunn County repossessed the property for back taxes. The Stout Institute bought the property from the county and converted it to a women's dormitory named Eichelberger Hall for the University of Wisconsin–Stout in 1945. The house was later converted to offices for the university and now houses the Stout University Foundation and the Stout Alumni Association. On July 18, 1974, the house was added to the National Register of Historic Places.
