= Knapp, Stout & Co. =

Defunct American lumber company

Knapp, Stout & Co. was a lumber company based in Menomonie, Wisconsin in the 19th and early 20th centuries. The company was established in 1846, when John Holly Knapp and William Wilson purchased a half-interest in a lumber mill on the Red Cedar River from David Black; it was originally known as Black & Knapp. Later, Andrew Tainter acquired a quarter-interest, and the company became the Knapp-Tainter Lumber Company. Henry Stout bought a quarter interest in the company in 1853, and its name became Knapp, Stout & Company. The company's location allowed it to control the lumber industry in the region, and by 1870 it controlled the logging industry in the Red Cedar River valley. In 1878, the company incorporated, and its official name became the Knapp, Stout & Co., Company. The company employed over 2,000 workers in the Menomonie area and produced 85 million board feet of lumber on average yearly from 1871 to 1896; its output made it the largest lumber company in the world. In the 1880s, the company expanded to sites along the Mississippi River, opening offices in Dubuque, Iowa, Read's Landing, Minnesota, and St. Louis. By the 1900s, the company had largely depleted its lumber supply; it closed many of its camps and dissolved early in the 20th century. The company sent out its last shipment of lumber on August 12, 1901.

In addition to logging, Knapp, Stout & Co. built many community institutions in Menomonie and northern Wisconsin. The company funded the first schools in both Barron County and Dunn County and established Evergreen Cemetery, which is listed on the National Register of Historic Places (NRHP). In addition, company partner Andrew Tainter built the NRHP-listed Louis Smith Tainter House and the Mabel Tainter Memorial Building in Menomonie. Henry Stout's son James Huff Stout founded the University of Wisconsin–Stout with his inheritance from the company.

== John Holly Knapp ==
John Holly Knapp (1825–1888) was born in New York state in 1825 to General John Holly Knapp (born May 20, 1791), the founder of new Fort Madison, Iowa and Harriet Knapp (nee Seely), and grew up in Fort Madison. At first he remained in Fort Madison, although travelled frequently to Menomonie. At Fort Madison he had a son Henry with his first wife, Caroline Field, and two children, Effie and William with his second wife, Valaria Adams. But as the business grew, he moved to Menomonie, where four more children were born, John Holly III, Edgar, Herbert and Rolla. During 1878–1886 Knapp was president of the firm. The village of Knapp, Dunn County, Wisconsin was named for him.

== Henry Lane Stout ==
Henry Lane Stout (October 23, 1814 – July 17, 1900) was born in New Jersey. After pursuing some other interests, he became a lumber salesman at Knapp-Tainter and in 1853 acquired a quarter-interest in it.

For five years Stout was mayor of Dubuque, Iowa. He also served on the board of directors for the Dubuque & Sioux City Railroad (1867-1869), the Dakota & Dubuque Railroad (1881), and the Iowa Pacific Railroad (1876), and served as an officer and on the board of directors of the Dunleith & Dubuque Bridge Company and the Dunleith & Dubuque Ferry Company (1868-1893).
