= Menomonie, Wisconsin =

City in Wisconsin, United States

- City
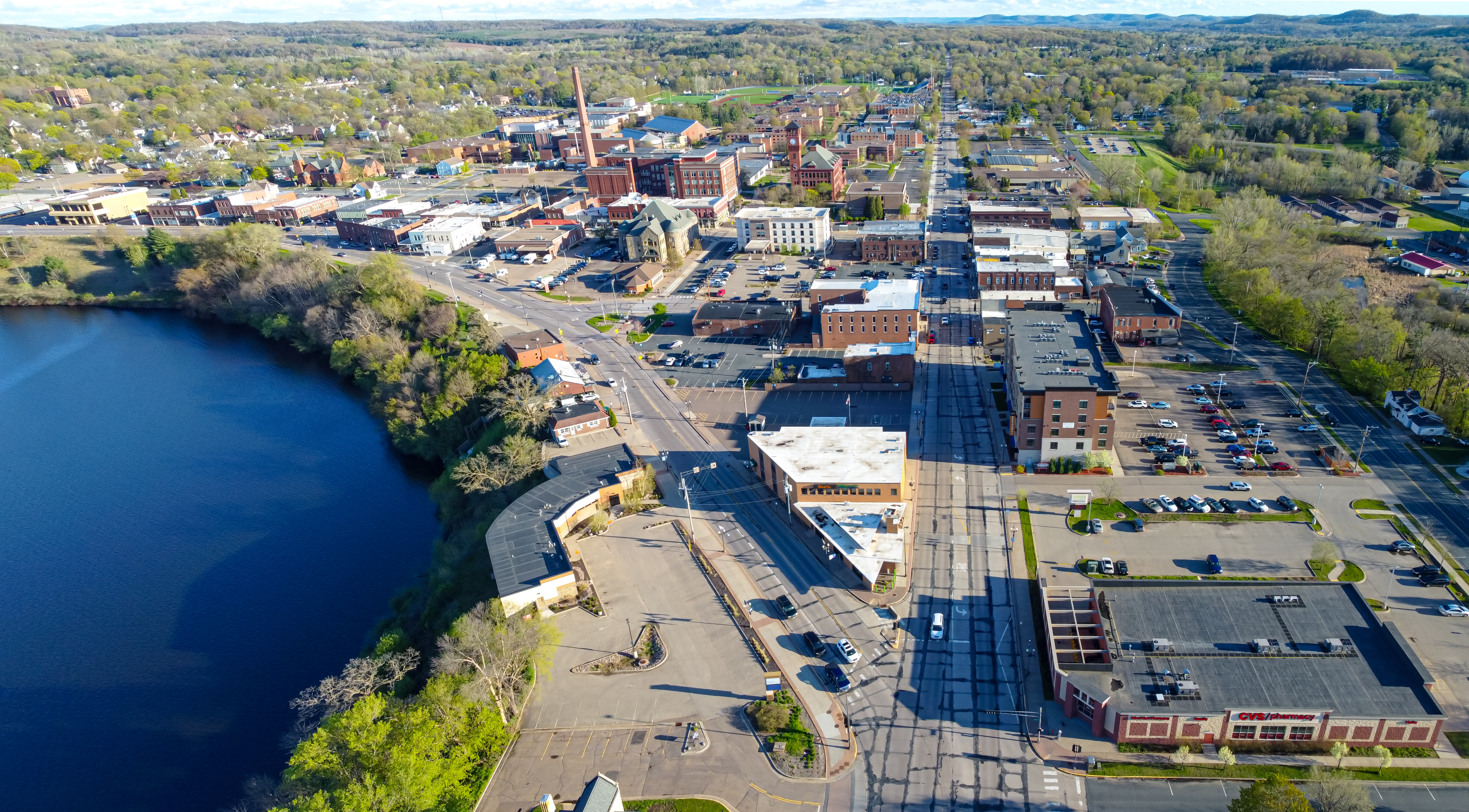
- Downtown Menomonie and UW–Stout Polytechnic
- Motto(s): Tradional, Yet Progressive
- Location of Menomonie in Dunn County, Wisconsin

- Location within Wisconsin Location within the United States
- Coordinates: 44°52′45″N 91°55′5″W
- Country: United States
- State: Wisconsin
- County: Dunn
- Established: 1882
- Founder: William Wilson

Government
  - Type: Mayor-Council
  - Mayor: Matthew Crowe
  - Council President: Cody Gentz

Area
  - Total: 15.44 sq mi (39.98 km^{2})
  - Land: 13.70 sq mi (35.47 km^{2})
  - Water: 1.74 sq mi (4.51 km^{2})

Population (2020)
  - Total: 16,843
  - Estimate (2021): 16,794
  - Density: 1,229.9/sq mi (474.9/km^{2})
- Time zone: UTC−6 (Central (CST))
  - Summer (DST): UTC−5 (CDT)
- Zip Code: 54751
- Area codes: 715 & 534
- FIPS code: 55-51025
- Website: www.menomonie-wi.gov

Menomonie (/məˈnɒməni/ mə-NOM-ə-nee) is a city and the county seat of Dunn County located in the Western Upland region of Wisconsin, United States.
Menomonie forms the core of the United States Census Bureau's Menomonie Micropolitan Statistical Area (MSA), which includes all of Dunn County (2020 population: 45,440). The Menomonie MSA and the Eau Claire–Chippewa Falls metropolitan area to the east form the Census Bureau's Eau Claire-Menomonie Consolidated Metropolitan Statistical Area. Menomonie is home to the University of Wisconsin–Stout Polytechnic, the state's designated polytechnic university which enrolls nearly 7,000 students. According to the 2020 census, the city's population was 16,843.

The city center is at the south end of Lake Menomin, a reservoir on the Red Cedar River. The name Menomonie is derived from manoomin, the Ojibwe word for wild rice, and is usually translated as "wild rice people".

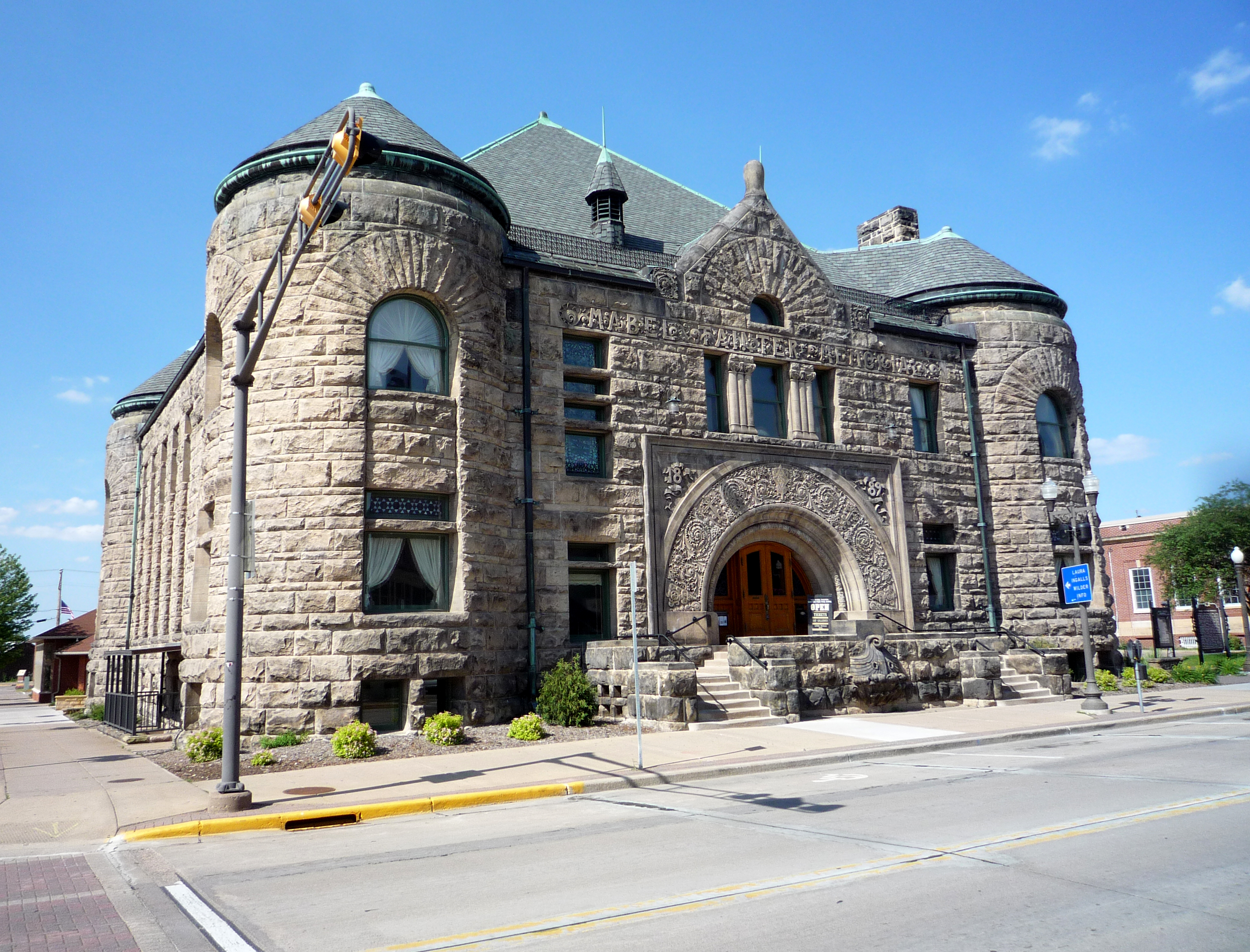
The Mabel Tainter Center for the Arts, originally named the Mabel Tainter Memorial Building

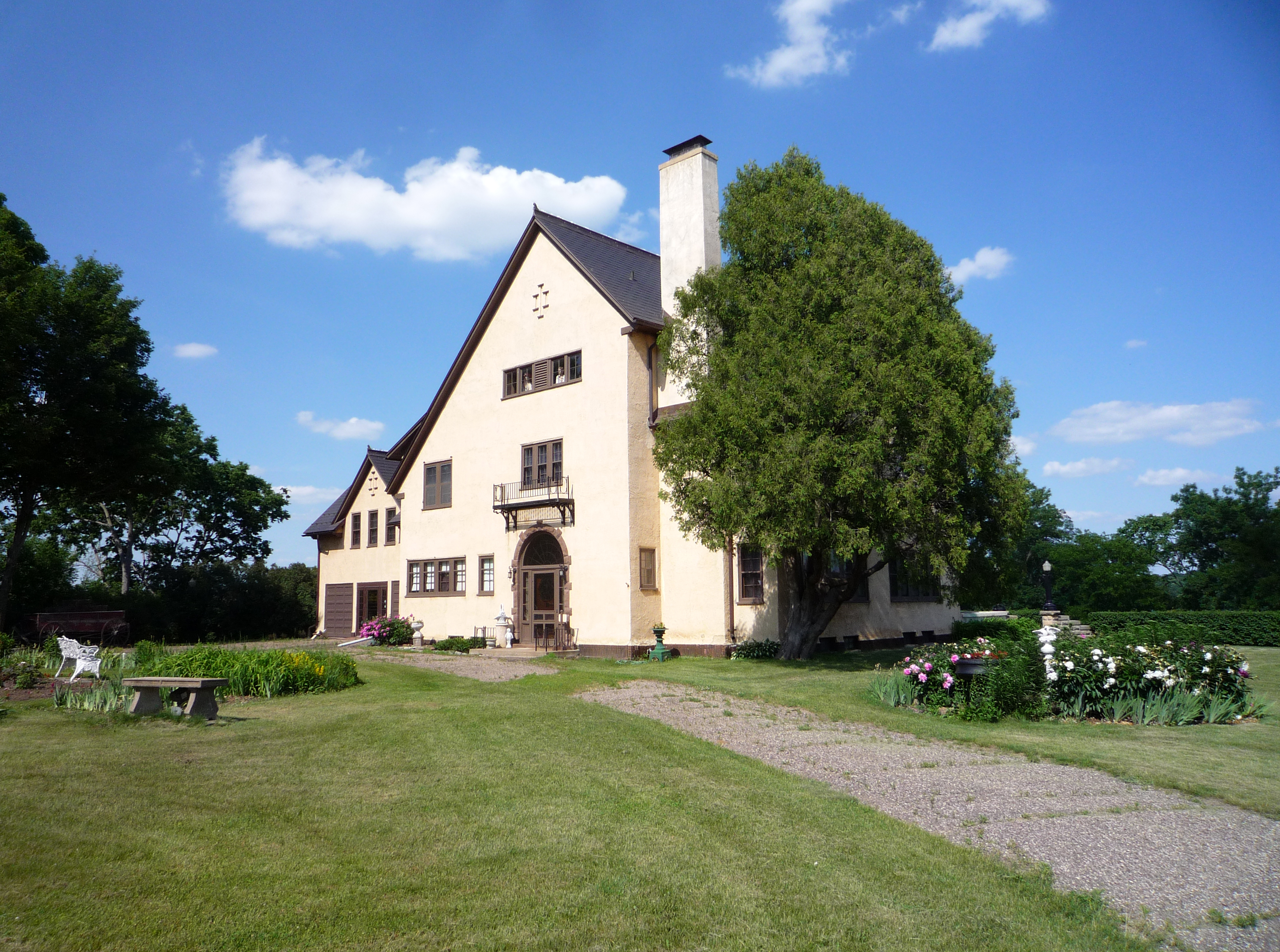
Wilson Place Museum

== History ==
The earliest known residents of the area were people from the Trempealeau Hopewell Culture of the Middle Woodland Period (100–400 CE). Evidence from their culture includes a mound from the Wakanda Mounds Group in Wakanda Park, along the western shore of Lake Menomin. Most of these mounds are thought to be from Effigy Mound cultures from this time period. Artifacts from the Late Woodland Period (400–1000 CE) have also been uncovered. It is theorized that agricultural villages supported the population during summer months, transitioning to hunting and gathering from fall through spring. The next known population group is the Santee Dakota in the 1600s and 1700s, who engaged in conflicts with the Ojibwe people, who migrated west as refugees. Armed with European weapons, the Ojibwe pushed westward, eventually winning at the Battle of Kathio in 1770. The two tribes continued their warfare, eventually signing the 1825 First Treaty of Prairie du Chien, which made a border between the two just north of Menomonie, with the Dakota claiming the southern lands.

In 1788, French-Canadian fur trader and schoolmaster Jean Baptiste Perrault established a trading post and fort on the Red Cedar River very near Menomonie.

The lumber industry brought Menomonie permanent settlement and economic prosperity in the 1800s. Hardin Perkins established the first sawmill at the confluence of Wilson Creek and the Red Cedar River in 1822 on behalf of fur traders James H. Lockwood and Joseph Rolette of Prairie du Chien. The mill was washed away by a sudden overflow in the river within a year. Working with Indian Agent General Street, Perkins, Lockwood and Rolette began a legal battle over the authority of the local Native American people to grant permissions of this sort, exchanging land for payment of blankets, beads, whiskey, and other merchandise to Dakota Chief Wapasha II and other Ojibwe chiefs. In 1830 the traders received permission from the federal government to rebuild their lumber operation. This was the first permanent settlement on the land that became the city of Menomonie.

Lockwood built a second mill and dam on the west side of the Red Cedar River, at the confluence of Gilbert Creek. He sold this to Hiram S. Allen, a lumberman from Vermont. In 1839, Allen built a new sawmill in its place, which he sold to the McCann brothers, settlers from Ohio who later became the first permanent residents of Eau Claire. In 1849, the Gilbert Creek Mill became the site of the first post office.

Lockwood and Rolette sold their original operation to James Green in 1841, who turned over the deed to William Black in 1842. In 1846, William Wilson and John Holly Knapp jointly purchased the mill, naming it Black & Knapp Mill. Wilson and his family settled in the area, eventually building what is now the Wilson Place Museum in 1859. Wilson founded the city of Menomonie and became its first mayor in 1882, as well as a Wisconsin State Senator.

Captain Andrew Tainter and Henry L. Stout acquired 1/3 interest in Wilson and Knapp's company, forming Knapp, Stout & Co. in 1853, the company that would come to define the town for generations. Tainter was a silent partner, whose duties included shipping lumber down to the Mississippi River and returning with supplies. By 1873, Knapp, Stout & Co. had become the world's largest lumber corporation. In 43 years, its output grew from 100,000 to 5,706,602 feet of lumber. It had 1,200 employees and owned 115,000 acres (47,000 ha) of pine forest. The post office was moved to the site of the Knapp, Stout & Co. Company in 1855, with Wilson as postmaster.

Menomonie was incorporated as a city in 1882.

The Mabel Tainter Memorial Building, a local landmark, was built in 1890 and dedicated on July 3, 1890, by Tainter in honor of his daughter Mabel, who had died in 1886 at the age of 19. In 1891, Wisconsin State Senator James Huff Stout, son of Henry L. Stout, founded a manual training school, the first of several educational enterprises he launched in Menomonie. These educational programs were combined into the Stout Institute in 1908, and still stand as the University of Wisconsin–Stout Polytechnic.

In 1901, the water mill shut down, and Knapp, Stout & Co. closed operations in the area. The Wisconsin Power Company and Submerged Electric Motor Co. acquired some of the company's facilities, the latter to house the world's first outboard motor factory. In 1902, the Wilson-Weber Lumber Company took over the retail operations of the Knapp, Stout & Co. That same year, Menomonie founded the nation's first agricultural high school, the Dunn County School of Agriculture and Domestic Economy.

== Geography ==
The city sits on the boundary of the Central Plain and Western Upland topographies of the state's official geographic regions. Ecologically, it is located within the northern reaches of the Wisconsin Department of Natural Resources' Western Coulees and Ridges landscape. Native vegetation primarily consists of mixed hardwood forests with occasional pine stands, interspersed by oak savannas, while wetlands are common in riparian or low areas. Menomonie is physically located near the confluence of Wilson Creek with the Red Cedar River, a principal tributary of the Chippewa River which ultimately flows into the Mississippi River. According to the United States Census Bureau, the city has an area of 15.47 square miles (40.07 km^{2}), of which 13.69 square miles (35.46 km^{2}) is land and 1.78 square miles (4.61 km^{2}) is water. Menomonie is located at 44°52′45″N 91°55′5″W (44.879, −91.918).

=== Climate ===
Climate data for Menomonie, Wisconsin, 1991–2020 normals, extremes 1957–present
Month	Jan	Feb	Mar	Apr	May	Jun	Jul	Aug	Sep	Oct	Nov	Dec	Year
Record high °F (°C)	55 (13)	60 (16)	82 (28)	90 (32)	96 (36)	98 (37)	100 (38)	101 (38)	96 (36)	90 (32)	76 (24)	64 (18)	101 (38)
Mean maximum °F (°C)	42.7 (5.9)	48.4 (9.1)	62.6 (17.0)	77.8 (25.4)	85.4 (29.7)	89.9 (32.2)	91.0 (32.8)	90.1 (32.3)	86.3 (30.2)	79.3 (26.3)	62.3 (16.8)	47.1 (8.4)	92.9 (33.8)
Mean daily maximum °F (°C)	24.0 (−4.4)	29.4 (−1.4)	41.9 (5.5)	56.4 (13.6)	68.2 (20.1)	77.9 (25.5)	82.0 (27.8)	79.9 (26.6)	72.2 (22.3)	58.9 (14.9)	42.7 (5.9)	29.2 (−1.6)	55.2 (12.9)
Daily mean °F (°C)	14.3 (−9.8)	18.3 (−7.6)	30.6 (−0.8)	44.3 (6.8)	56.3 (13.5)	66.3 (19.1)	70.6 (21.4)	68.3 (20.2)	60.2 (15.7)	47.5 (8.6)	33.1 (0.6)	20.6 (−6.3)	44.2 (6.8)
Mean daily minimum °F (°C)	4.5 (−15.3)	7.3 (−13.7)	19.3 (−7.1)	32.3 (0.2)	44.4 (6.9)	54.8 (12.7)	59.2 (15.1)	56.7 (13.7)	48.2 (9.0)	36.0 (2.2)	23.6 (−4.7)	12.0 (−11.1)	33.2 (0.7)
Mean minimum °F (°C)	−17.8 (−27.7)	−13.5 (−25.3)	−1.8 (−18.8)	18.5 (−7.5)	30.4 (−0.9)	41.2 (5.1)	48.5 (9.2)	46.4 (8.0)	33.8 (1.0)	22.6 (−5.2)	7.8 (−13.4)	−9.9 (−23.3)	−20.2 (−29.0)
Record low °F (°C)	−39 (−39)	−40 (−40)	−34 (−37)	4 (−16)	20 (−7)	30 (−1)	41 (5)	37 (3)	25 (−4)	12 (−11)	−13 (−25)	−36 (−38)	−40 (−40)
Average precipitation inches (mm)	0.94 (24)	1.08 (27)	1.97 (50)	2.96 (75)	4.53 (115)	5.14 (131)	4.02 (102)	4.02 (102)	3.63 (92)	2.74 (70)	1.82 (46)	1.34 (34)	34.19 (868)
Average snowfall inches (cm)	9.7 (25)	11.0 (28)	7.3 (19)	2.4 (6.1)	0.0 (0.0)	0.0 (0.0)	0.0 (0.0)	0.0 (0.0)	0.0 (0.0)	0.2 (0.51)	3.5 (8.9)	6.3 (16)	40.4 (103.51)
Average precipitation days (≥ 0.01 in)	8.0	6.3	8.0	10.5	12.9	12.6	10.9	10.4	10.5	10.3	7.6	8.5	116.5
Average snowy days (≥ 0.1 in)	5.4	4.4	3.0	1.0	0.1	0.0	0.0	0.0	0.0	0.1	1.8	5.4	21.2
Source 1: NOAA
Source 2: National Weather Service

== Government ==
Menomonie operates under a mayor–council government structure established by applicable state statutes. Serving as the city's executive, an at-large mayor is elected to a two-year term. Legislative authority is vested in an eleven-member Common Council, with each alderperson representing a specific designated ward for a two-year term. The council governs municipal policy through the adoption of ordinances and the annual budget. While an appointed city administrator oversees operation of various administrative departments. Core municipal services provided by the city include public safety, public works, a municipal court, and a public library.

As the county seat of Dunn County, Menomonie is the county's governmental center and is home to the county courthouse and jail facilities. At the federal level, the city is situated within Wisconsin's 3rd congressional district. Representation in the Wisconsin Legislature consists of Senate District 31 and Assembly District 92.

== Demographics ==
Historical population
Census	Pop.	Note	%±
1860	970		—
1870	2,210		127.8%
1880	4,177		89.0%
1890	5,491		31.5%
1900	5,655		3.0%
1910	5,036		−10.9%
1920	5,104		1.4%
1930	5,595		9.6%
1940	6,582		17.6%
1950	8,245		25.3%
1960	8,624		4.6%
1970	11,112		28.8%
1980	12,769		14.9%
1990	13,547		6.1%
2000	14,937		10.3%
2010	16,264		8.9%
2020	16,843		3.6%
2021 (est.)	16,794		−0.3%
U.S. Decennial Census

=== 2020 census ===
As of the 2020 census, Menomonie had a population of 16,843. The population density was 1,229.9 inhabitants per square mile (474.9/km^{2}). The median age was 25.1 years. 15.1% of residents were under the age of 18 and 13.5% of residents were 65 years of age or older. For every 100 females there were 107.4 males, and for every 100 females age 18 and over there were 106.9 males age 18 and over.

94.4% of residents lived in urban areas, while 5.6% lived in rural areas.

There were 6,242 households in Menomonie, of which 21.7% had children under the age of 18 living in them. Of all households, 29.7% were married-couple households, 26.9% were households with a male householder and no spouse or partner present, and 33.6% were households with a female householder and no spouse or partner present. About 39.0% of all households were made up of individuals and 14.1% had someone living alone who was 65 years of age or older.

There were 6,674 housing units at an average density of 487.3 per square mile (188.1/km^{2}), of which 6.5% were vacant. The homeowner vacancy rate was 1.1% and the rental vacancy rate was 5.4%.

Racial composition as of the 2020 census
Race	Number	Percent
White	14,832	88.1%
Black or African American	283	1.7%
American Indian and Alaska Native	85	0.5%
Asian	742	4.4%
Native Hawaiian and Other Pacific Islander	4	0.0%
Some other race	144	0.9%
Two or more races	753	4.5%
Hispanic or Latino (of any race)	466	2.8%

=== 2010 census ===
As of the census of 2010, there were 16,264 people, 5,743 households, and 2,455 families living in the city. The population density was 1,188.0 inhabitants per square mile (458.7/km^{2}). There were 6,234 housing units at an average density of 455.4 per square mile (175.8/km^{2}). The racial makeup of the city was 91.9% White, 0.8% African American, 0.5% Native American, 4.2% Asian, 0.6% from other races, and 1.9% from two or more races. Hispanic or Latino people of any race were 1.7% of the population.

There were 5,743 households, of which 20.1% had children under the age of 18 living with them, 30.9% were married couples living together, 8.4% had a female householder with no husband present, 3.4% had a male householder with no wife present, and 57.3% were non-families. 36.1% of all households were made up of individuals, and 12.7% had someone living alone who was 65 years of age or older. The average household size was 2.26 and the average family size was 2.87.

The median age in the city was 23.4 years. 13.4% of residents were under the age of 18; 42% were between the ages of 18 and 24; 18.5% were from 25 to 44; 14.9% were from 45 to 64; and 11% were 65 years of age or older. The gender makeup of the city was 49.5% male and 50.5% female.

It is important to remember that a large percentage of the 42% between 18 and 24 were students at the University of Wisconsin–Stout Polytechnic.

=== 2000 census ===
As of the 2000 census, there were 14,937 people, 5,119 households, and 2,370 families living in the city. The population density was 1,160.7 people per square mile (448.1/km^{2}). There were 5,441 housing units at an average density of 422.8 per square mile (163.2/km^{2}). The racial makeup of the city was 93.79% White, 0.76% Black or African American, 0.41% Native American, 3.21% Asian, 0.01% Pacific Islander, 0.64% from other races, and 1.18% from two or more races. 1.14% of the population were Hispanic or Latino of any race.

There were 5,119 households, out of which 22.6% had children under the age of 18 living with them, 36.0% were married couples living together, 7.5% had a female householder with no husband present, and 53.7% were non-families. 32.7% of all households were made up of individuals, and 11.1% had someone living alone who was 65 years of age or older. The average household size was 2.35 and the average family size was 2.95.

In the city, the population was spread out, with 15.5% under the age of 18, 40.4% from 18 to 24, 20.5% from 25 to 44, 12.3% from 45 to 64, and 11.3% who were 65 years of age or older. The median age was 23 years. For every 100 females, there were 99.1 males. For every 100 females age 18 and over, there were 98.6 males.

The median income for a household in the city was $31,103, and the median income for a family was $44,458. Males had a median income of $30,893 versus $21,898 for females. The per capita income for the city was $15,994. About 9.1% of families and 23.5% of the population were below the poverty line, including 16.7% of those under age 18 and 7.3% of those age 65 or over.

== Transportation ==
Dunn County Transit
- Parent: Dunn County
- Headquarters: 640 Stokke Parkway
- Locale: Menomonie, Wisconsin
- Service type: Bus service, paratransit
- Routes: 4
- Fleet: 9
- Annual ridership: 125,678 (2025)
- Director: Austin Witt
- Website: dunncountywi.gov/transit

=== Dunn County Transit ===
Dunn County Transit operates the public transportation system serving Menomonie. The system is owned by Dunn County, with funding from UW–Stout Polytechnic, ADRC, and the City of Menomonie.

==== Services ====
The system includes both fixed-route and combined demand responsive/paratransit services, the latter operated under the Red Cedar or "Doorstop" name. All routes are available to the general public:

Route	Description
Community	Provides weekday daytime citywide service, with limited trips on Saturday mornings.
Stout DAY	Weekday only, high frequency shuttle serving the main campus areas.
Stout PM	Provides weekday evening service between campus and off-campus retail centers.
Red Cedar	"Doorstop" (demand responsive and paratransit) service to outlying and rural areas.

==== Ridership ====
Year	Ridership	Change over previous year
2014	159,088	n/a
2015	153,606	▼3.45%
2016	133,776	▼12.91%
2017	111,208	▼16.87%
2018	114,652	▲3.1%
2019	135,194	▲17.92%
2020	98,821	▼26.9%
2021	29,697	▼69.95%
2022	94,599	▲218.55%
2023	132,806	▲40.39%

=== Aviation ===
Menomonie Municipal Airport (also known as Score Field) (KLUM) is a public use general aviation airport serving the city and surrounding areas. The airport is owned by the City and does not offer scheduled commercial services.

=== Major highways ===
Interstate 94 passes through the northern part of Menomonie, serving as the city's main freeway connection to Eau Claire to the east and the Twin Cities to the west. State Highway 25 is the primary north–south artery through the spine of the city, intersecting with US Highway 12 and State Highway 29, which together provide east–west arterial and regional access. Dunn County Highway B serves major industrial developments along the city's eastern edge.

== Education ==
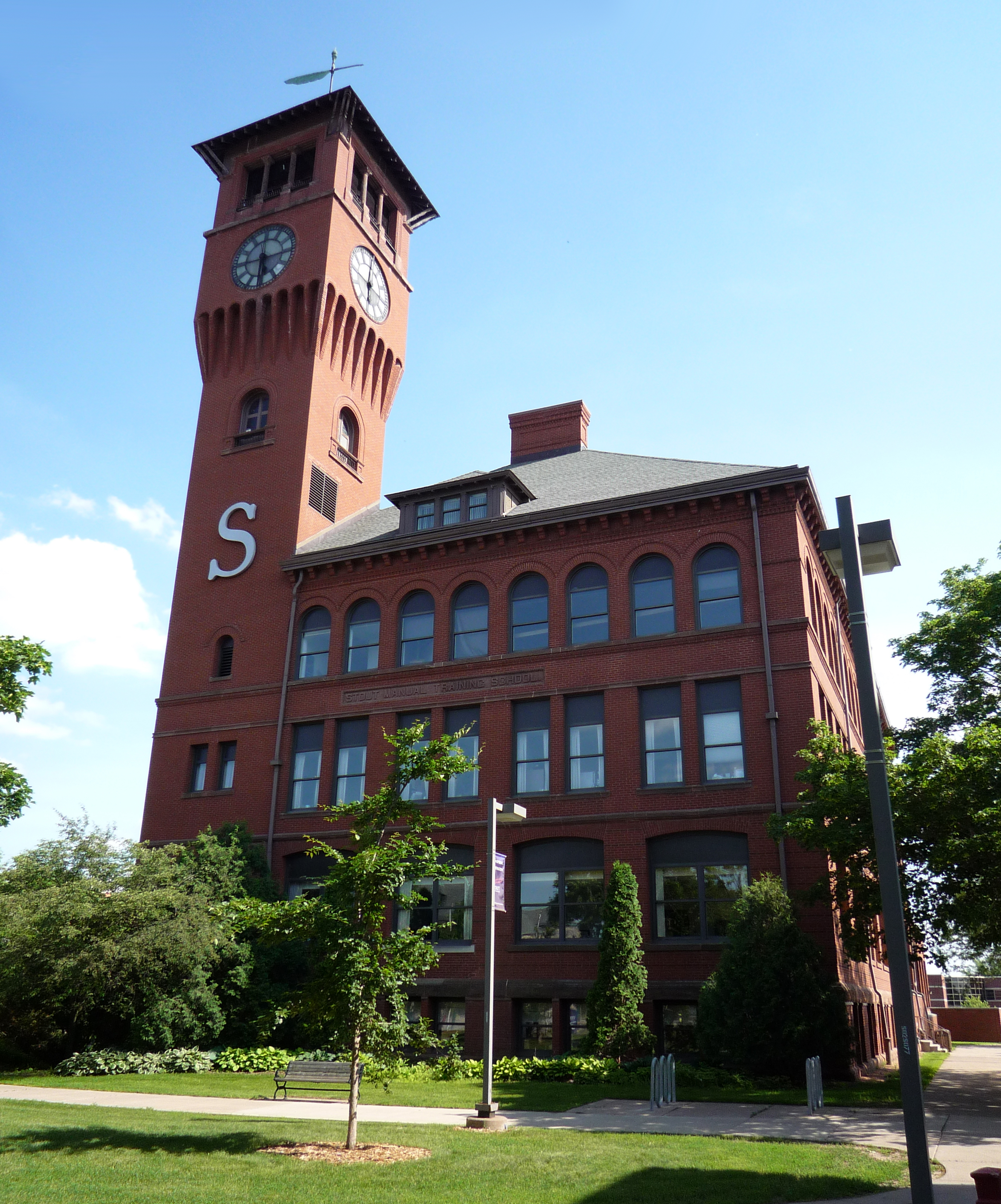
Bowman Hall at the University of Wisconsin-Stout Polytechnic

Menomonie schools are part of the Menomonie Area School District.

The city has one public high school, Menomonie High School, and one public middle school, Menomonie Middle School. There are four public elementary schools in the district: River Heights Elementary, Wakanda Elementary, Oaklawn Elementary, and Knapp Elementary.

Downsville Elementary was shut down after the completion of the 2024-2025 school year.

St. Paul's Lutheran School is a Christian Pre-K–8 school of the Wisconsin Evangelical Lutheran Synod (WELS) in Menomonie.

The city is home to the University of Wisconsin–Stout Polytechnic. It also has a campus of Chippewa Valley Technical College, which provides adult education services and employee training for area businesses.

== Media and telecommunications ==
Menomonie is assigned to the Minneapolis–Saint Paul television market. Due to its geographic location, the city relies on the Eau Claire market for most over-the-air and local news coverage. The city is the community of license for WHWC-TV, which serves as the PBS Wisconsin affiliate for the region. It also hosts local NOAA Weather Radio station (WXJ88). The Fox affiliate for the area, WEUX, is technically licensed to Chippewa Falls, but maintains its transmitter in nearby Colfax in Dunn County. Radio stations licensed to the city include iHeartMedia outlets WMEQ-AM and WMEQ-FM. Wisconsin Public Radio also maintains two local stations WHWC-FM and WVSS as part of its statewide network.

Local telecommunications infrastructure is maintained by a mix of national and regional providers. Charter Communications (Spectrum) operates the local cable television franchise. TDS Telecom provides a competing FTTP network that was established during a market expansion into the region. West Wisconsin Telcom cooperative serves as the area's legacy incumbent local exchange carrier and provides fiber optic services to outlying parts of the city and surrounding portions of the local exchange.

The Dunn County News is the city's newspaper of record. This weekly publication was founded in 1856 and is owned by Lee Enterprises. In November 2024, the non-profit Menomonie News Net launched to provide expanded hyperlocal coverage. UW–Stout is served by the Stoutonia, a student-run campus newspaper established in 1915.

== Notable people ==
- Stewart J. Bailey, Wisconsin legislator
- Bill Bakke, ski jumper who competed in the 1968 Winter Olympics
- G. H. Bakke, Wisconsin legislator
- Alvin J. Baldus, U.S. representative
- Wilfred Duford, NFL player
- Rockwell J. Flint, Wisconsin state legislator and newspaper editor
- Vern Fuller, MLB player
- John Paul Gerber, author and historian
- Wilson Hall, half of the comedy duo God's Pottery
- Tim Harmston, stand-up comedian
- Lorenzo D. Harvey, educator
- Luke Helder, University of Wisconsin—Stout Polytechnic student who attempted to create a smiley-face on the United States map with pipe bombs
- Ethan Iverson, jazz pianist and founding member of The Bad Plus
- Gus Johnson, YouTuber and comedian who graduated from the University of Wisconsin—Stout Polytechnic
- Warren S. Johnson, founder of Johnson Controls and former school principal in Menomonie in the late 19th century
- Mariah Keopple, professional women's ice hockey player for the Seattle Torrent
- Ellen Kort, Wisconsin's first Poet Laureate, grew up in Menomonie
- Reynold Kraft, NFL player
- Tim Krumrie, Pro Bowl (1987–1988), nose tackle for the Cincinnati Bengals
- Robert Macauley, Wisconsin legislator and jurist
- Harry Miller, "the greatest creative figure in the history of the American racing car"
- Tom Neumann, professional football player
- Marvin Panch, stock car racing driver, winner of 1961 Daytona 500
- Sewell A. Peterson, politician
- Joe Plouff, politician
- Charles Sanna, inventor of Swiss Miss instant hot chocolate
- Richard Shoemaker, Wisconsin legislator
- Nate Stanley, NFL player
- Earl L. Stendahl, art dealer
- James Huff Stout, legislator and businessman
- Jeremiah Burnham Tainter, engineer
- Tom Wiedenbauer, Major League Baseball outfielder and first-base coach for the Cleveland Indians
- Aaron Yonda, comedy video producer

== Notable attractions ==
- The Mabel Tainter Theater
- Hoffman Hills State Recreation Area
- Red Cedar State Trail

== In popular culture ==
- Caddie Woodlawn, a Newbery Award-winning novel, is based on the girlhood adventures of Caroline Augusta Woodhouse, who lived about 10 miles south of Menomonie. The novel is by Woodhouse's granddaughter, Carol Ryrie Brink, and was published in 1936. There is a historical marker in the wayside park near the Woodhouse house.
- The eighth episode of season 11 of the television show Supernatural takes place in Menomonie.
- Holloway Roberts from Mark Z. Danielewski's House of Leaves was born in Menomonie. He uses this fact as a mantra throughout his narrative.

== Sister cities ==
Menomonie has two sister city relationships:

- Nasukarasuyama, Japan
- Konakovo, Russia

== See also ==
- Kraft State Bank robbery
